= List of Can-Am Challenge Cup circuits =

The Canadian-American Challenge Cup or Can-Am raced on 30 different circuits in its history between 1966 and 1987. Mosport Park hosted 24 races over 18 seasons, the most of any track.

| Circuit | Type | Location | Seasons | Total Races | Map |
|---|---|---|---|---|---|
| Bridgehampton Circuit | Road course | (United States) Bridgehampton, New York; 40°58′52.648″N 72°20′30.462″W | 1966–1969 | 4 | |
| Caesars Palace | Street circuit | (United States) Las Vegas, Nevada; 36°07′1″N 115°10′30″W | 1981–1982 | 2 | |
| Charlotte Motor Speedway | Roval | (United States) Concord, North Carolina; 35°21′3″N 80°41′1″W | 1978–1979 | 2 | |
| Dallas Street Circuit at Fair Park | Street circuit | (United States) Dallas, Texas; 32°46′55″N 96°45′56″W | 1984 | 1 | |
| Donnybrooke International Raceway | Road course | (United States) Brainerd, Minnesota; 46.417069°N 94.273142°W | 1970–1972, 1979–1980, 1984 | 6 | |
| Edmonton International Speedway | Road course | (Canada) Edmonton, Alberta; 53°36′25.2″N 113°33′25.2″W | 1968–1973, 1981 | 7 | |
| Green Valley Raceway | Road course | (United States) North Richland Hills, Texas; 32°53′48″N 97°12′37″W | 1984 | 1 | |
| Hallett Motor Racing Circuit | Road course | (United States) Hallett, Oklahoma; 36°13′16″N 96°35′35″W | 1987 | 1 | |
| Laguna Seca Raceway | Road course | (United States) Monterey, California; 36°35′05″N 121°45′10″W | 1966–1973, 1977–1982 | 14 | |
| Lime Rock Park | Road course | (United States) Lakeville, Connecticut; 41°55′40″N 73°23′1″W | 1983–1985 | 4 | |
| Michigan International Speedway | Roval | (United States) Brooklyn, Michigan; 42°03′58.68″N 84°14′29.18″W | 1969 | 1 | |
| Mid-Ohio Sports Car Course | Road course | (United States) Troy Township, Morrow County, Ohio; 40°41′21″N 82°38′11″W | 1969–1974, 1977–1982 | 12 | |
| Milwaukee Mile | Roval | West Allis, Wisconsin; 43°01′12″N 88°00′36″W | 1987 | 1 | |
| Mont-Tremblant Circuit | Road course | (Canada) Mont-Tremblant, Quebec; 46°11′16″N 74°36′36″W | 1966, 1969–1971, 1977–1978 | 6 | Mont Tremblant |
| Mosport Park | Road course | (Canada) Bowmanville, Ontario; 44°2′53″N 78°40′32″W | 1966–1967, 1969–1974, 1977–1986 | 24 | |
| Phoenix International Raceway | Mile Oval | Phoenix, Arizona; 33°22′29.1″N 112°18′40.14″W | 1987 | 1 | |
| Pueblo Motorsports Park | Road course | (United States) Pueblo, Colorado; 38°18′6.35″N 104°40′36.47″W | 1987 | 1 | |
| Riverside International Raceway | Road course | (United States) Riverside, California; 33°56′13.2″N 117°16′21.2″W | 1966–1973, 1977–1982, 1984 | 15 | |
| Road America | Road course | (United States) Elkhart Lake, Wisconsin; 43°48′0″N 87°59′13″W | 1967–1974, 1977–1983 | 15 | |
| Road Atlanta | Road course | (United States) Braselton, Georgia; 34°8′48″N 83°49′4″W | 1970–1974, 1978–1980, 1982, 1984 | 10 | |
| Sanair Super Speedway | Tri-Oval | (Canada) Saint-Pie, Québec; 45°31′44.76″N 72°53′1.32″W | 1987 | 1 | |
| Sears Point Raceway | Road course | (United States) Sonoma, California; 38°9′36″N 122°27′34″W | 1977, 1980, 1983–1984 | 4 | |
| Stardust International Raceway | Road course | (United States) Spring Valley, Nevada; 36°6′28″N 115°15′9″W | 1966–1968 | 3 | |
| St. Louis Raceway Park | Road course | (United States) Madison, Illinois; 38.65080°N 90.13537°W | 1985–1986 | 2 | |
| St. Petersburg Street Circuit | Street circuit | (United States) St. Petersburg, Florida; 27°45′59″N 82°37′45″W | 1985 | 1 | |
| Summit Point Motorsports Park | Road course | (United States) Summit Point, West Virginia; 39.23439°N 77.97529°W | 1986 | 1 | |
| Texas World Speedway | Roval | (United States) College Station, Texas; 30°32′13.2″N 96°13′15.6″W | 1969 | 1 | |
| Trois-Rivières Street Circuit | Street circuit | (Canada) Trois-Rivières, Québec; 46°20′51″N 72°33′31″W | 1977–1984 | 8 | |
| Watkins Glen International | Road course | (United States) Watkins Glen, New York; 42°20′13″N 76°55′38″W | 1969–1974, 1977–1981 | 11 | |
| Willow Springs International Motorsports Park | Road course | (United States) Kern County, California; 34°52′30″N 118°15′52″W | 1987 | 1 | |

== See also ==
- List of World Sportscar Championship circuits
- List of IMSA GT Championship circuits
- List of Pirelli World Challenge circuits
- List of American Le Mans Series circuits
