= Spyder NF-10 =

Spyder NF-10 Spyder NF-11
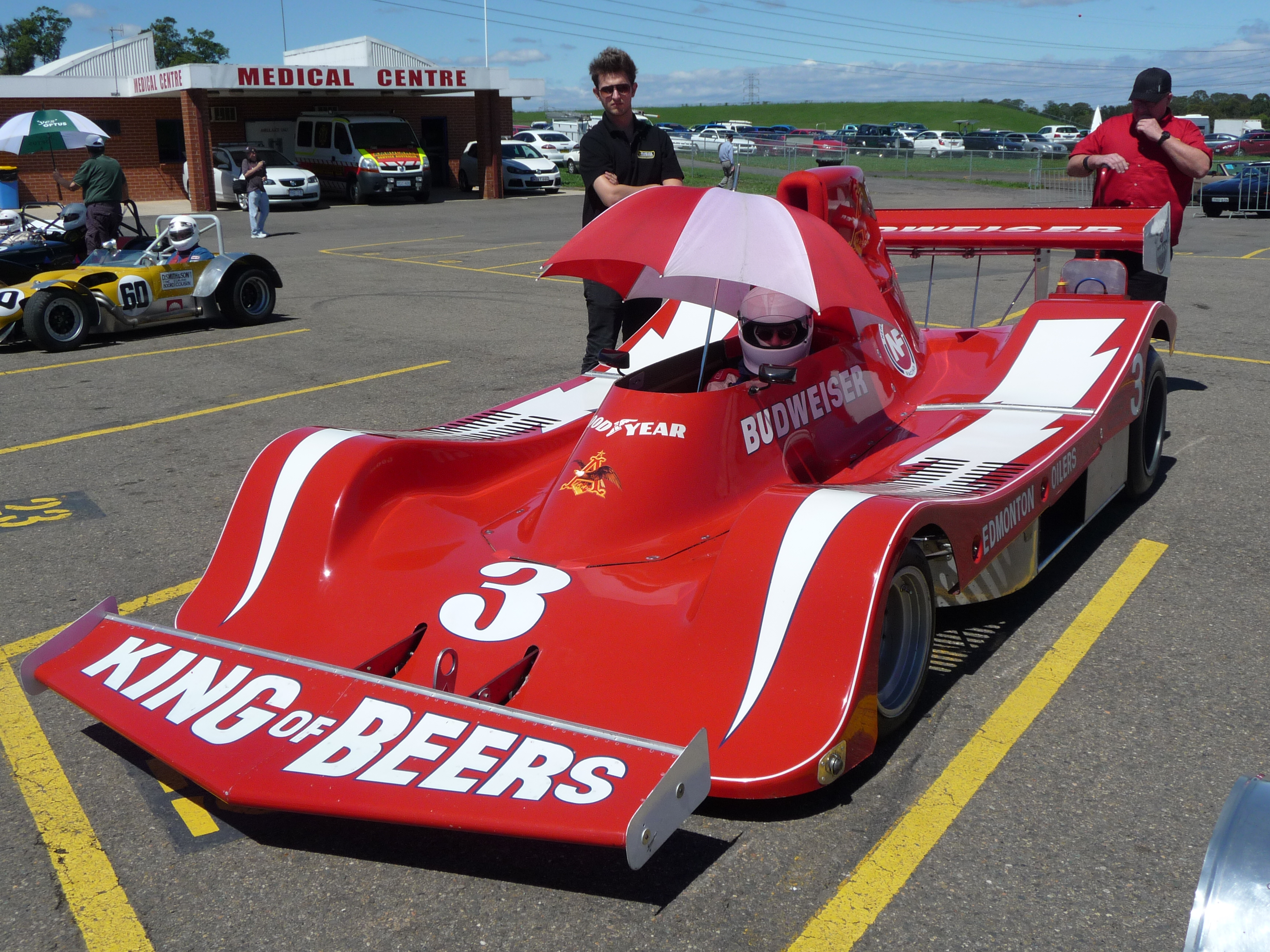
- Constructor: Spyder
- Predecessor: Lola T333CS
- Successor: Lola T530

Technical specifications
- Engine: Chevrolet 5,000 cc (305.1 cu in) V8 naturally-aspirated mid-engined

Competition history
- Notable entrants: Newman-Freeman Racing; Golden Gate Racing
- Notable drivers: Elliot Forbes-Robinson; Patrick Depailler; Keke Rosberg; Randolph Townsend; Howdy Holmes; Dan Craddock; Stephen South
- Debut: 1978 Can-Am Road Atlanta
Races	Wins	Poles
10 (NF-10); 11 (13 entries) (NF-11)	2 (NF-10); 3 (NF-11)	0 (NF-10); 7 (NF-11)
- Teams' Championships: 1: 1979 Can-Am

The Spyder NF-10 was an American sports prototype racing car built for the Can-Am series in 1978. It was based on a Lola T333CS, and was developed into the Spyder NF-11 in 1979. Two NF-10s were built in 1978, whilst four NF-11s were built in 1979, two of which were originally NF-10s. Both the NF-10 and NF-11 featured a 5-litre Chevrolet V8 engine.

== Racing history ==
=== NF-10 ===
In 1978, Spyder converted two Lola T333CS sports prototypes into the NF-10. The NF-10 featured a naturally-aspirated 5-litre Chevrolet V8 engine, and was built for the Can-Am series. The car made its debut at the opening round of the 1978 Can-Am season, held at Road Atlanta; Newman-Freeman Racing entered Elliot Forbes-Robinson in the car, and although he was classified eleventh, he did not finish the race due to a mechanical failure. The next round, held at Charlotte Motor Speedway, saw Forbes-Robinson win the race, finishing just over 35 seconds ahead of Alan Jones in second place, who was driving a regular Lola T333CS. He finished third at Mid-Ohio, 14th at Mont-Tremblant, and sixth at Watkins Glen. Having finished seventh at Road America and fourth at Mosport, Forbes-Robinson won his second race of the season at Trois-Rivières. He followed this with a 17th at Laguna Seca Raceway, and a third in the season finale at Riverside; in this latter event, Patrick Depailler drove the second NF-10, but could only finish 17th. This was the NF-10's last ever race. Forbes-Robinson finished fourth in the Driver's Championship, with 1537 points.

=== NF-11 ===
In 1979, Spyder updated the NF-10 and produced the NF-11. Initially, both NF-10s were updated to the new specification; however, as the season continued, two new cars were built. Like the NF-10, it featured a 5-litre Chevrolet V8 engine, and the car was still based on the Lola T333CS. Like 1978, the Can-Am season started at Road Atlanta; this time, however, Keke Rosberg won the race in one of the Newman-Freeman Racing NF-11s, whilst Forbes-Robinson finished third. The team was almost as successful in the next race, held at Charlotte Motor Speedway; Forbes-Robinson finished second, and Rosberg came third. For Mosport, three cars were entered; Rosberg, Forbes-Robinson, and Randolph Townsend; Forbes-Robinson took another second place, whilst Rosberg and Townsend both crashed out (on lap 28 and 25 respectively) of the race. Townsend didn't race at Mid-Ohio, but Rosberg took second, and Forbes-Robinson took third. Townsend returned at Watkins-Glen, and Rosberg took his second win of the season; however, Townsend was classified 13th, with a broken oil line forcing him out after 30 laps, and Forbes-Robinson also hit trouble after 18 laps, and was classified 20th. Road America was an unsuccessful event for the team as all three drivers retired; Townsend with a blown engine after 20 laps, Rosberg with valve issues after 19 laps, and Forbes-Robinson with suspension failure after 15 laps. The next race, held at Brainerd International Raceway, saw Forbes-Robinson finish second, although Townsend was limited to ninth place due to a fuel pickup issue, and Rosberg didn't complete the first lap due to a broken rod. Forbes-Robinson repeated his 1978 victory at Trois-Rivières; Rosberg finished seventh, having blown his engine, and Townsend finished 15th. Forbes-Robinson then finished second at Laguna Seca, with Howdy Holmes (replacing Townsend) finishing fourth, and Rosberg sixth, despite the latter crashing in practice. The final round of the season, held at Riverside, saw Forbes-Robinson take third, Townsend finish seventh, and Rosberg finish 14th, having crashed out after 44 laps. Forbes-Robinson finished second in the Driver's championship, with 45 points, whilst Rosberg finished fourth, with 29. Newman-Freeman Racing also won the Team's championship, with 61 points; they beat Carl A. Haas Racing Teams, Ltd. by a single point.

In 1980, Newman-Freeman Racing (now known as Newman Racing) replaced the Spyder NF-11 with the Lola T530. As a result, the car did not run in the first two rounds of the series, until Golden Gate Racing entered Dan Craddock in one of the NF-11s at Mosport; he retired after 25 laps with engine failure, and was classified twelfth. He was entered in the car again at Watkins Glen, but did not attend the race. No NF-11s were entered for the fifth round of the season, but Newman Racing entered Stephen South in one of the cars at Brainerd; he crashed in practice, and was unable to race. He was entered at Trois-Rivières, but crashed out in practice again; the accident was severe enough to require the amputation of his leg. This proved to be the last time an NF-11 was entered for a race.
