= Lola T333CS =

- Category: Can-Am
- Constructor: Lola
- Designer: Eric Broadley

Technical specifications
- Chassis: Steel and aluminium monocoque with load-bearing engine-transmission assembly
- Suspension (front): Independent, wishbones and inclined coil spring/shock absorber units
- Suspension (rear): Independent, single top link, twin tower links and coil spring/shock absorber units
- Axle track: Front: 1,625 mm (64.0 in); Rear: 1,625 mm (64.0 in)
- Wheelbase: 2,591 mm (102.0 in)
- Engine: Mid-engine, longitudinally mounted, 4,940 cc (301.5 cu in), Chevrolet, 90° V8, NA
- Transmission: Hewland DG300 5-speed manual
- Power: 500–600 hp (373–447 kW); 325–420 lb⋅ft (441–569 N⋅m)
- Weight: 650–665 kg (1,433–1,466 lb)

Competition history
- Notable entrants: Carl Hass Racing; Team VDS; Hogan Racing
- Notable drivers: (France) Patrick Tambay (United Kingdom) Peter Gethin (Australia) Alan Jones (Australia) Warwick Brown (Belgium) Jacky Ickx
- Debut: 1977 Can-Am Mont-Tremblant
Races	Wins	Poles	F/Laps
49	21	17	21
- Teams' Championships: 3
- Constructors' Championships: 3
- Drivers' Championships: 3: (1977 Can-Am, 1978 Can-Am, 1979 Can-Am)

The Lola T333CS was a race car designed and built by Lola Cars for use in SCCA Can-Am Series racing and made its racing debut in 1977. The T333CS was highly successful; winning 21 races, and 3 championships with three different drivers, between 1977 and 1979. The Lola T333CS commonly used the 5.0-litre Chevrolet V8 engine.
