= VDS-001 =

American sports prototype racing cars

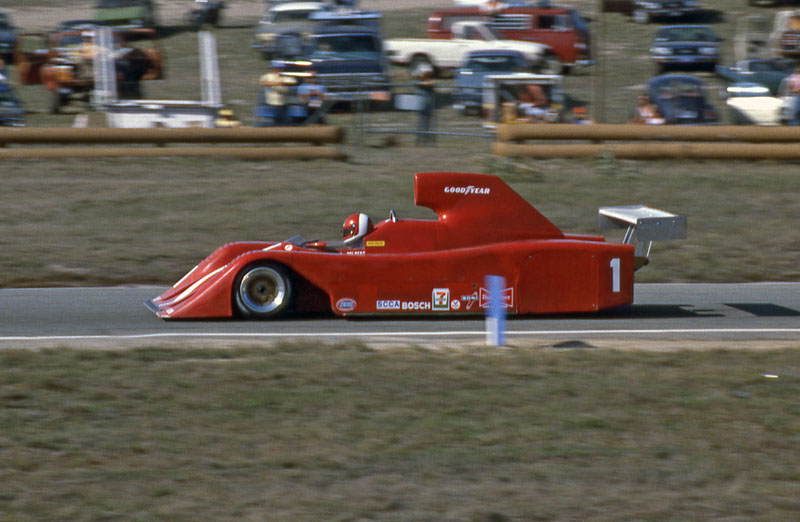
- Category: Can-Am
- Constructor: Racing Team VDS/Lola
- Predecessor: Lola T530
- Successor: VDS-002

Technical specifications
- Engine: Chevrolet 5,000 cc (305.1 cu in) V8 engine naturally-aspirated mid-engined
- Transmission: 5-speed manual
- Power: 550 hp (410 kW)
- Weight: 1,550–1,800 lb (703.1–816.5 kg)

Competition history
- Notable drivers: Geoff Brabham, Al Holbert
- Debut: 1981 Can-Am Mosport
Races	Wins	Podiums	Poles
38	19	26	21
- Drivers' Championships: 1: Geoff Brabham (1981 Can-Am)

The VDS-001 was an American closed-wheel sports prototype race car, designed, developed, and built by Racing Team VDS for the revived Can-Am series, in 1981. It is based on the Lola T530. Geoff Brabham won the 1981 Can-Am Championship with the car, despite only winning 2 of the 10 races that season. It won a further 4 races in 1982 Can-Am Championship in 1982, being driven by Al Holbert. It was later exported to England, where it competed in the British Thundersports series, and achieved great success. Its sports car racing career spanned 9 years (1981–1988), and over that period of time, it won a total of 19 races, achieved a total of 26 podium finishes, and scored 21 pole positions. As with most Can-Am cars of the time, it was powered by a 5.0 L (310 cu in) Chevrolet small-block motor.
