= Prophet MKI =

Prototype race car

- Category: Can-Am
- Constructor: Lola
- Designer(s): Eric Broadley

Technical specifications
- Chassis: Steel and aluminium monocoque with load-bearing engine-transmission assembly
- Suspension (front): Independent, wishbones and inclined coil spring/shock absorber units
- Suspension (rear): Independent, single top link, twin tower links and coil spring/shock absorber units
- Engine: Mid-engine, longitudinally mounted, 4,940 cc (301.5 cu in), Chevrolet, 90° V8, NA
- Transmission: Hewland DG300 5-speed manual
- Power: 500–600 hp (373–447 kW)
- Weight: 650–665 kg (1,433–1,466 lb)

Competition history
- Debut: 1978 Can-Am Mosport

The Prophet MKI, also known as the Prophet Mk.1, or simply the Prophet 1, was a sports prototype race car, based on the Lola T330 Formula 5000 car, and used in the SCCA's revived Can-Am series, between 1978 and 1979.
