= Caesars Palace Grand Prix =

Auto race held in Las Vegas, Nevada, USA

- Caesars Palace
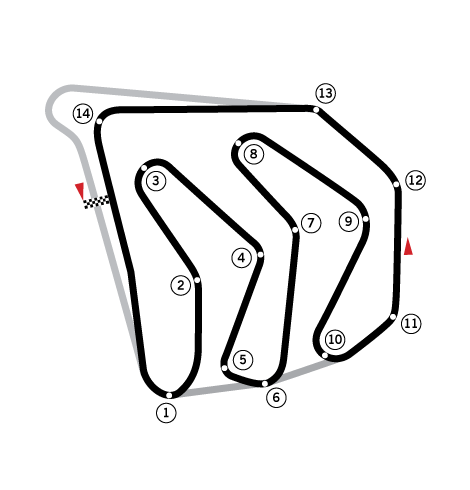

Race information
- Number of times held: 4
- First held: 1981
- Last held: 1984
- Most wins (drivers): (Australia) Alan Jones (Italy) Michele Alboreto (1)
- Most wins (constructors): (United Kingdom) Williams (United Kingdom) Tyrrell (1)
- Circuit length: 3.650 km (2.268 miles)
- Race length: 273.750 km (170.100 miles)
- Laps: 75

Last race (1984)

Pole position
- (United States) Danny Sullivan; Lola-Ford; 0:32.952

Podium
- 1. (United States) Tom Sneva; March-Ford; 2:08:13.55; 2. (United States) Mario Andretti; Lola-Ford; 3. (United States) John Paul Jr.; March-Ford

Fastest lap

The Caesars Palace Grand Prix was an annual car race held in Las Vegas, US from 1981 to 1984. In 1981 and 1982 the race was part of the Formula One World Championship and featured a 2.268 mi (3.650 km), 14 turn Grand Prix layout; in 1983 and 1984 it became a round of the CART Indy car series and featured a 5 turn 1.125 mi (1.811 km) distorted oval layout. Nissan/Datsun was a presenting sponsor of the races. The races were held on a temporary circuit in the parking lot of the Caesars Palace hotel.

== History ==
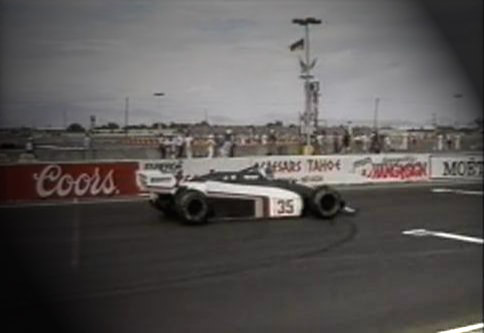
Derek Warwick (Toleman TG183 Hart) at Las Vegas in 1982

There had been Can-Am races at the Stardust International Raceway in the mid to late 1960s, but that circuit was bought by developers and then demolished in 1971.

The first race was originally supposed to take place as the last race of the 1980 season on November 2, 4 weeks after the US Grand Prix at Watkins Glen. But when Watkins Glen went off the schedule after 1980, the Caesars' Palace Grand Prix gained importance, and more effort was put forth by Bernie Ecclestone and others to make sure this Las Vegas race went ahead. The new race ended the year, whereas Long Beach, only 300 mi (480 km) away, started it. But the Las Vegas Caesars Palace circuit was not as popular among the drivers as Long Beach, primarily because of the flat, repetitive nature of the circuit, its parking-lot location, and Las Vegas itself. It has been described as one of the worst circuits Formula One has ever visited.

The track was laid out in the parking lot of the Caesars Palace hotel and was set up for a temporary circuit. Wide enough for overtaking, it provided ample run-off areas filled with sand and had a surface that was as smooth as glass. Its counter-clockwise direction, however, put a tremendous strain on the drivers' necks, which were used to the more common clockwise tracks. When Nelson Piquet clinched his first World Championship by finishing fifth in 1981, it took him 15 minutes to recover from heat exhaustion after barely making it to the finish. The 1982 race, held in intense heat—another unpleasant feature of this race—was won by Michele Alboreto in a Tyrrell, but that was the end of Formula One racing in Las Vegas, since the races had drawn only tiny crowds (the venue has been described as "an impossibly tight and unedifying circuit that failed to excite drivers or fans") and the 1981 race made a huge loss for the hotel.

Following the withdrawal of Formula One, the event was assumed by the CART Indy car series for 1983 and 1984. The circuit was modified with turns 1, 6, and 10 connected in a continuous straight, producing a flat 1.125 mi (1.811 km) distorted oval. The two races were contested over 178 laps, a distance of 200.25 mi (322.27 km). For the 1984 running, the exit of the final corner was widened, increasing lap speeds by around 7 mph from the previous year. Following the 1984 race, the circuit disappeared from the calendar, with the location now covered with urban development (namely, the Forum Shops at Caesars and the Mirage).

The first Las Vegas Formula One race since 1982 was the Las Vegas Grand Prix, running on a 3.853 mi (6.201 km) circuit through city streets including Las Vegas Boulevard (the Strip), as part of the 2023 World Championship.

== Winners ==
Modified oval layout used in 1983–1984 (1983–1984)

FIA Formula One World Championship history
Year	Driver	Constructor	Location	Report
1981	(Australia) Alan Jones	Williams-Ford	Caesars Palace, Las Vegas	Report
1982	(Italy) Michele Alboreto	Tyrrell-Ford	Caesars Palace, Las Vegas	Report

Can-Am Series history
Year	Date	Winning driver	Car	Team
1981	October 16	(United States) Danny Sullivan	Frissbee-Chevrolet	Garvin Brown Racing
1982	September 26	(United States) Danny Sullivan	March 827-Chevrolet	Newman/Budweiser

CART Indy Car history
Year	Date	Winning driver	Car	Team
1983	October 8	(United States) Mario Andretti	Lola-Cosworth	Newman/Haas Racing
1984	November 10	(United States) Tom Sneva	March-Cosworth	Mayer Motor Racing

Trans-Am Series history
Year	Date	Winning driver	Car	Team
1983	October 8	(United States) Willy T. Ribbs	Chevrolet Camaro	DeAtley Motorsports
1984	November 11	(United States) Tom Gloy	Mercury Capri	Tom Gloy Racing

== Lap records ==
The fastest official race lap records at the Caesars Palace Grand Prix are listed as:

Category	Time	Driver	Vehicle	Event
Modified "Distorted Oval" (1983–1984): 1.125 mi (1.811 km)
Trans-Am	0:38.000	Tom Gloy	Mercury Capri	1984 Caesars Palace Trans-Am round
Grand Prix Circuit (1981–1982): 2.268 mi (3.650 km)
Formula One	1:19.639	Michele Alboreto	Tyrrell 011	1982 Caesars Palace Grand Prix
Can-Am	1:26.025	Danny Sullivan	Frissbee GR2	1981 Caesars Palace Can-Am round

== See also ==
- List of Formula One Grands Prix
- United States Grand Prix
- Dallas Grand Prix
- Detroit Grand Prix
- United States Grand Prix West
- Grand Prix of America (proposed, never held)
- Las Vegas Grand Prix
