= Lola T530 =

- Category: Can-Am
- Constructor: Lola

Technical specifications
- Length: 182 in (462.3 cm)
- Width: 83 in (210.8 cm)
- Axle track: 70 in (177.8 cm) (Front); 64 in (162.6 cm) (Rear)
- Wheelbase: 106.5 in (270.5 cm)
- Engine: Chevrolet 5,000 cc (305.1 cu in) V8 engine naturally-aspirated mid-engined
- Transmission: 4/5-speed Manual
- Power: 510 hp (380 kW); 400 lb⋅ft (542 N⋅m)
- Weight: 650–665 kg (1,433.0–1,466.1 lb)
- Tyres: Goodyear

Competition history
- Notable entrants: Carl A. Haas racing Team, Racing Team VDS
- Notable drivers: Patrick Tambay, Geoff Brabham
- Debut: 1980 Can-Am Sears Point
| Races | Wins | Podiums |
|---|---|---|
| 156 | 32 | 43 |
- Teams' Championships: 2: Carl A. Haas Racing Team (1980), Racing Team VDS (1981)
- Constructors' Championships: 2: Lola
- Drivers' Championships: 2: 1980 Can-Am (Patrick Tambay), 1980 Can-Am (Geoff Brabham)

The Lola T530 is a purpose-built Can-Am sports prototype, designed by British manufacturer Lola Cars in for the revived Can-Am series 1980. It was very successful, winning 7 of the 9 races in its first season of competition alone, and gave Patrick Tambay the championship with Carl A. Haas racing Team. Geoff Brabham won the championship in 1981; despite only winning 2 races. It was used in Can-Am racing until 1983. It was later used in the international Interserie racing series, and the British Thundersports racing series, between 1984 and 1988. Between 1980 and 1988, it scored a total of 32 race wins, and 43 podium finishes; a very impressive tally indeed. As with all other full-size Can-Am cars of the time, it used a mid-mounted 5-liter, naturally-aspirated, Chevrolet V8 engine. A total of 10 chassis' were built.
