= Geoff Brabham =

Australian racecar driver

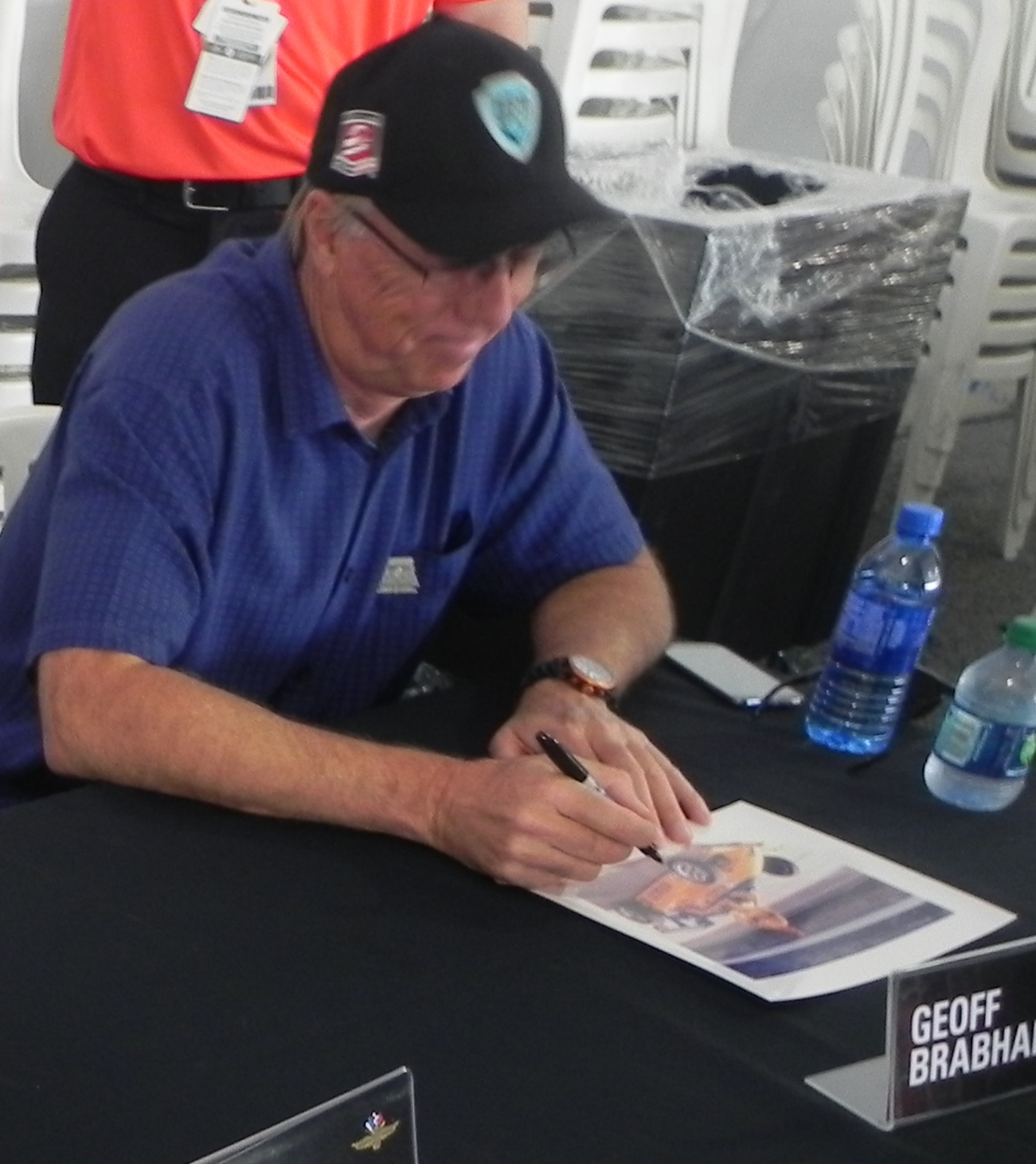
- Brabham at the 2014 Indianapolis 500
- Nationality: (Australia) Australian
- Born: Geoffrey John Brabham; 20 March 1952 (age 74) Sydney, Australia
- Retired: 2001
- Relatives: Jack Brabham (father); Matthew Brabham (son); Gary Brabham (brother); David Brabham (brother); Sam Brabham (nephew); Lisa Thackwell (sister in law)

Australian Super Touring Championship
- Years active: 1995–1997
- Teams: BMW Motorsport Australia
- Starts: 48
- Wins: 9
- Best finish: 2nd in 1995 & 1997 Australian Super Touring Championship

Previous series
- 1974 1975 1978 1979 1981–87, 1990, 1992, 1994 1979–81 1987–92 1989–94 1993–2001: Australian Formula Ford; Australian Formula 2 British Formula One Championship; Formula Super Vee; Indycar Can-Am; IMSA GT Championship; IROC; V8 Supercar

Championship titles
- 1975 1979 1981 1988 1989 1990 1991: Australian Formula 2 Championship; SCCA Super Vee Championship; Can-Am; IMSA GTP Championship; IMSA GTP Championship; IMSA GTP Championship; IMSA GTP Championship

Awards
- 2004: Motorsports Hall of Fame of America

Geoffrey John Brabham (born 20 March 1952) is an Australian racing driver. Brabham spent the majority of his racing career in the United States.

== Racing career ==
=== CART ===
Brabham raced successfully in CART early in his career, finishing eighth in 1982, 1984 and 1987 with nine podiums. In ten appearances in the Indianapolis 500, he had a best result of fourth in 1983 and fifth in 1981.

=== Sports car racing ===
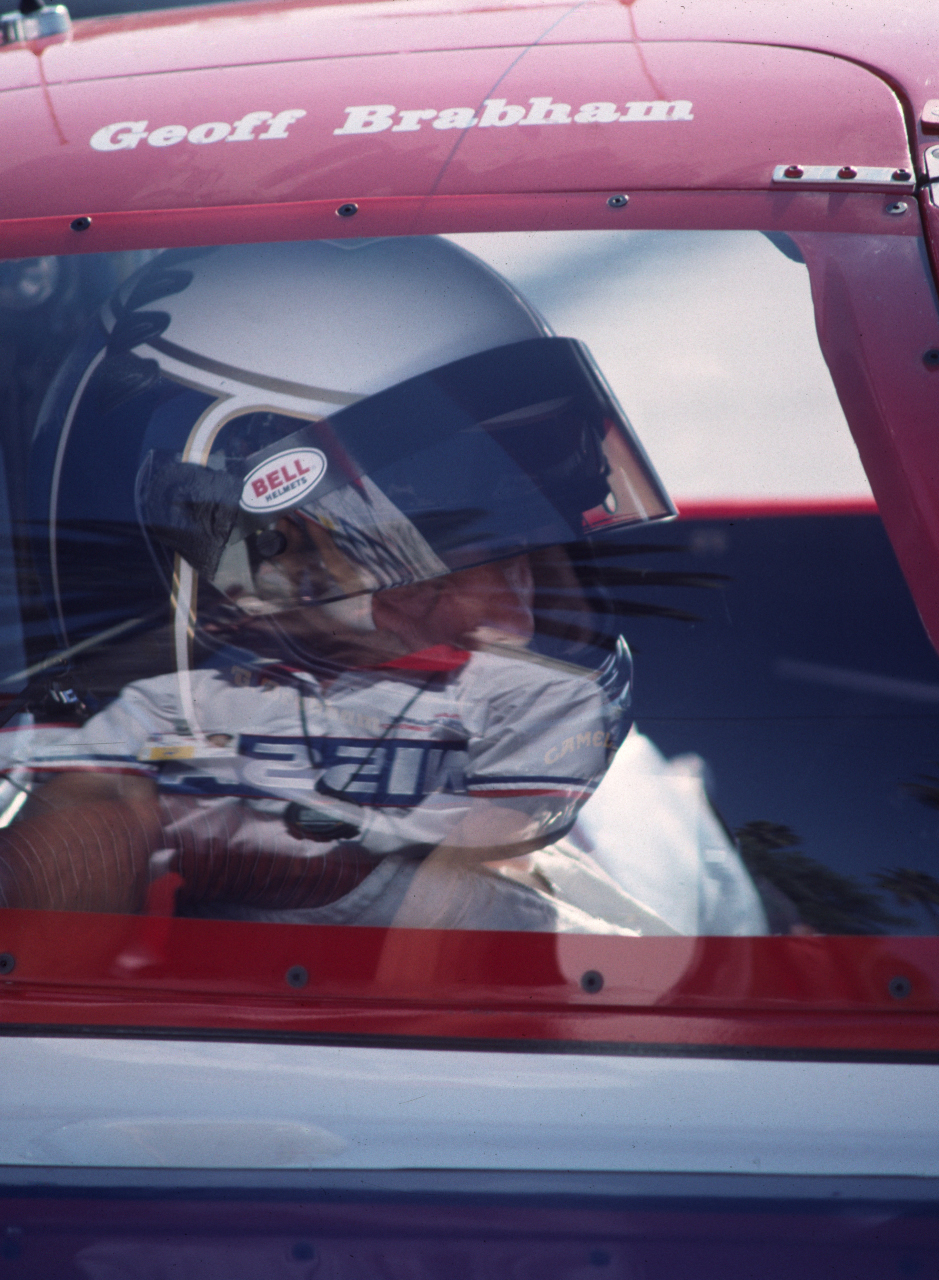
Brabham in 1990

Brabham's greatest source of success was in various forms of sports cars, winning four IMSA GTP titles (1988–1991) when racing for Nissan, and one Can-Am championship (1981).

Brabham also won the 1993 24 Hours of Le Mans driving one of the factory Peugeot 905 alongside French drivers Éric Hélary and Christophe Bouchut. His younger brother David Brabham had won the GT class in the race driving a Jaguar XJ220 for Tom Walkinshaw Racing, but the team was later disqualified for technical infringements. Geoff Brabham became just the third Australian driver to win Le Mans after Bernard Rubin (1928) and Vern Schuppan in 1983. His brother, David Brabham would also go on to win Le Mans in 2009, also driving for the factory Peugeot team.

=== Touring car racing ===
Later in his career, Brabham returned to Australia, where he was runner-up in the 1995 and 1997 Australian Super Touring Championship, and won the 1997 Bathurst 1000 Super Touring race driving a BMW 320i alongside brother David. The pair initially finished second behind BMW Motorsport Australia teammates Paul Morris and Craig Baird, but a blunder by the team left Baird in his car at the final pit stop which meant that by the end of the race, the Kiwi driver had breached the race regulation which limited any one driver to a maximum of three hours continuous driving. This caused their disqualification and handed the win to the Brabham brothers.

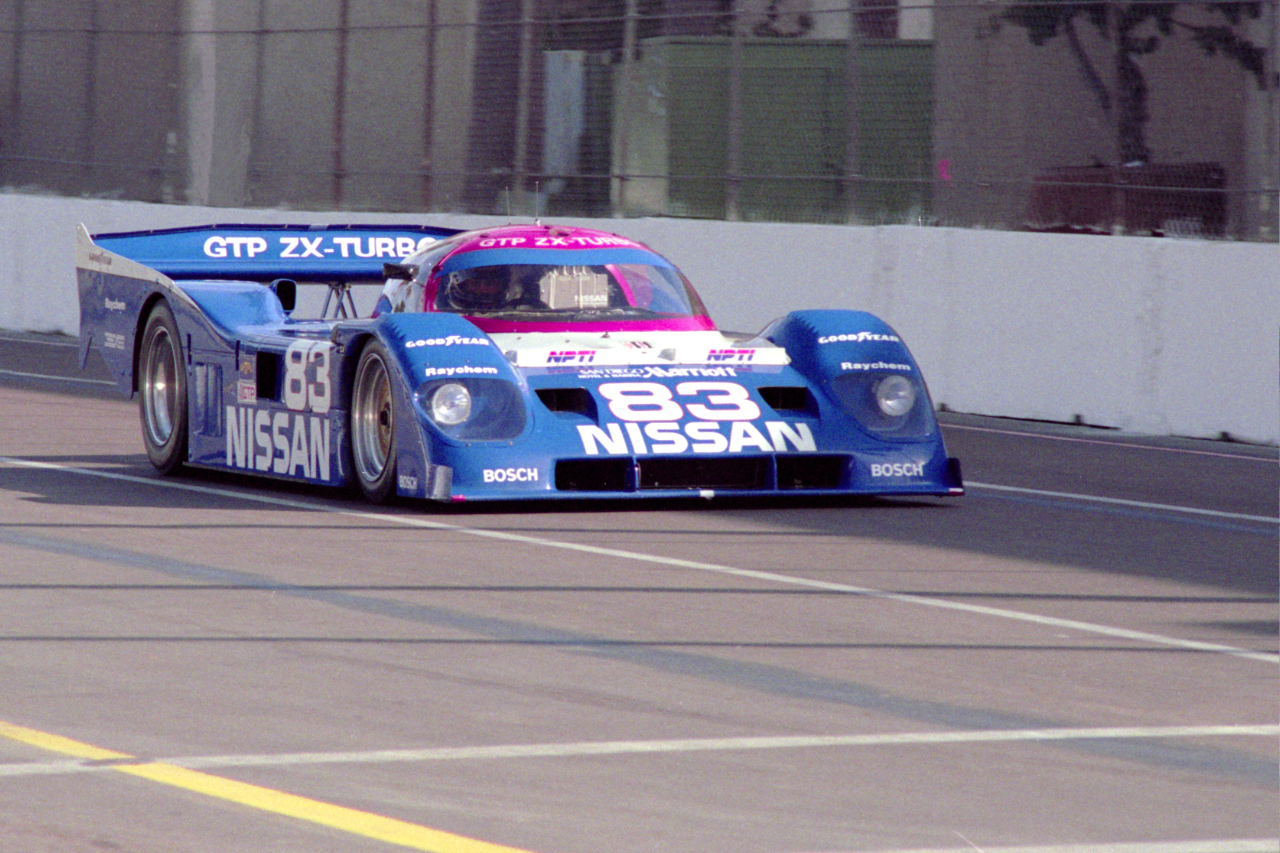
Brabham's 1990 IMSA GTP car

Brabham dabbled in V8 Supercar drives in his native Australia throughout his career. He is still one of the few drivers to win his first race, Sandown 500 in 1993. He started eleven races for one victory.

=== Stock car racing ===
Brabham took two race victories in the International Race of Champions stock car series (1992 and 1993), both at Michigan. He made his only NASCAR Winston Cup Series start at the first ever Brickyard 400 at Indianapolis in 1994, driving for Michael Kranefuss. Brabham crashed in the second half of the race.

== Personal life ==
Brabham is the son of three-time Formula One World Champion Jack Brabham. He has two younger brothers; Gary and David. Geoff teamed with David to win the 1997 Bathurst 1000 in a BMW, becoming the only brothers to have combined to win the race. Although the most successful of the second generation of racing Brabhams, unlike his siblings he did not compete in World Championship Formula One.

Married to Roseina Brabham, a multi-time jet-ski champion, Brabham has retired from competition himself to focus on his son Matthew's racing career. After a successful karting career, Matthew moved into international open-wheel racing and the Road to Indy ladder; he is also a three-time Stadium Super Trucks champion.

== Awards ==
Brabham was inducted in the Motorsports Hall of Fame of America in 2004. In 2014, Brabham was assigned as the chief director of Nissan and its developer Nismo.

== Racing record ==
Season	Series	Position	Car	Team
1973	TAA Formula Ford Driver to Europe Series	7th	Elfin 620 Ford	Jack Brabham Ford
1974	TAA Formula Ford Driver to Europe Series	**3rd**	Bowin P6F Ford	
1975	Australian Formula 2 Championship	**1st**	Birrana 274 Ford	Grace Bros - Levi's Racing Team
1976	Shellsport F3 Series	11th	Ralt RT1 Toyota	
1976	BP Super Visco F3 Series	8th	Ralt RT1 Toyota	
1977	Vandervell F3 Series	6th	Ralt RT1 Toyota	
1977	BP F3 Series	4th	Ralt RT1 Toyota	
1978	British Formula One Championship	24th	Boxer PR2 Hart	Boxer Cars
1979	Formula Super Vee Championship	**1st**	Ralt RT1 Volkswagen	
1979	Canadian-American Challenge Cup	15th	Hogan HR-001 Chevrolet	Hogan Racing
1980	Canadian-American Challenge Cup	**3rd**	Lola T530 Chevrolet	Racing Team VDS
1981	Canadian-American Challenge Cup	**1st**	Lola T530 Chevrolet; VDS 001 Chevrolet	Racing Team VDS
1982	CART PPG Indy Car World Series	8th	March 81C Cosworth	Bignotti-Cotter Racing
1982	Canadian-American Challenge Cup	14th	Frissbee GR2 Chevrolet	Rick Galles Racing
1983	CART PPG Indy Car World Series	21st	Penske PC-10/82 Cosworth; March 83C Cosworth	Racing Team VDS; Kraco Racing
1984	CART PPG Indy Car World Series	8th	March 84C Cosworth	Kraco Racing
1985	CART PPG Indy Car World Series	15th	March 85C Cosworth	Kraco Racing
1986	CART PPG Indy Car World Series	12th	Lola T8600 Cosworth	Galles Racing
1987	CART PPG Indy Car World Series	8th	March 87C Honda	Galles Racing
1988	IMSA GTP Championship	**1st**	Nissan GTP ZX-T	Nissan Motorsport
1989	IMSA GTP Championship	**1st**	Nissan GTP ZX-T	Nissan Performance Technology
1989	International Race of Champions	10th	Chevrolet Camaro	
1990	IMSA GTP Championship	**1st**	Nissan GTP ZX-T; Nissan NPT90	Nissan Performance Technology
1990	International Race of Champions	11th	Dodge Daytona	
1991	IMSA GTP Championship	**1st**	Nissan R90C; Nissan NPT90; Nissan NPT91	Nissan Performance Technology
1991	International Race of Champions	7th	Dodge Daytona	
1992	International Race of Champions	6th	Dodge Daytona	
1993	International Race of Champions	6th	Dodge Daytona	
1994	International Race of Champions	11th	Dodge Avenger	
1995	Australian Super Touring Championship	**2nd**	BMW 318i	Paul Morris Motorsport
1996	Australian Super Touring Championship	4th	BMW 318i	Paul Morris Motorsport
1997	Australian Super Touring Championship	**2nd**	BMW 320i	Paul Morris Motorsport
1999	Shell Championship Series	31st	Ford AU Falcon	Glenn Seton Racing
2001	Shell Championship Series	36th	Ford AU Falcon	Steven Ellery Racing

=== American Open-Wheel racing results ===
==== Complete USAC Mini-Indy Series results ====
Year	Entrant	1	2	3	4	5	6	7	8	9	10	Pos	Points
1978	David Psachie	PIR1	TRE1	MOS; 12	MIL1; 6	TEX	MIL2	OMS1	OMS2	TRE2; 1	PIR2	**13th**	**290**
1979		TEX1; 19	IRP; 3	MIL1; 3	POC; 4	TEX2; 5	MIL2; 2	MIN1; 6	MIN2; 6			**3rd**	**824**

==== Complete USAC Championship Car results ====
Year	1	2	3	4	5	6	Pos	Points
1981-82	INDY; 5	POC; 2	ILL	DUQ	ISF	INDY; 28	2nd	1,310
1982–83	ISF	DSF	NAZ	INDY; 4			4th	600
1983-84	DSF	INDY; 33					38th	5

==== CART ====
(key) (Races in bold indicate pole position)

Year	Team	No.	Chassis	Engine	1	2	3	4	5	6	7	8	9	10	11	12	13	14	15	16	17	Rank	Points	Ref
1981	Kraco Racing	54	Penske PC-7	Cosworth DFX V8t	PHX1; 9	MIL1	ATL1	ATL2	MIS													**27th**	**14**	
1981	All American Racers	48	Eagle 81	Chevrolet V8						**RIV**; 19	MIL2	MIS2	WGL	MEX; 9	PHX2							**27th**	**14**	
1982	Pentax Super	21	March 81C	Cosworth DFX V8t	PHX1; 15	ATL; 15																**8th**	**110**	
1982	Pentax Super	21	March 82C	Cosworth DFX V8t			MIL1; 7	CLE; 6	MIS1; 7	MIL2; 10	POC; 4	RIV; 28	ROA; 15	MIS2; 3	PHX2; 20							**8th**	**110**	
1983	Team VDS	12	Penske PC-10	Cosworth DFX V8t	ATL	INDY; 4	MIL	CLE														**21st**	**13**	
1983	Wysard Racing	34	March 83C	Cosworth DFX V8t					MIS1; 22	ROA	POC											**21st**	**13**	
1983	Kraco Racing	18	March 83C	Cosworth DFX V8t								RIV; 18	MDO	MIS2; 12	LVG; 20	LS; 16	PHX					**21st**	**13**	
1984	Kraco Racing	18	March 84C	Cosworth DFX V8t	LBH; 2	PHX1; 16	INDY; 33	MIL; 17	POR; 2	MEA; 3	CLE; 8	MIS1; 9	ROA; 5	POC; 14	MDO; 21	SAN; 15	MIS2; 11	PHX2; 16	LS; 5	LVG; 5		**8th**	**87**	
1985	Galles Racing	7	March 85C	Cosworth DFX V8t	LBH; 6	INDY; 19	MIL; 12	POR; 14	MEA; 24	CLE; 2	MIS1; 29	ROA; 15	POC; 19	MDO; 13	SAN; 4	MIS2; 16	LS; 10	PHX; 12	MIA; 22			**15th**	**41**	
1986	Galles Racing	8	Lola T86/00	Cosworth DFX V8t	PHX1; 10	LBH; 3	INDY; 12	MIL; 21								SAN; 11	MIS2; 11		LS; 6	PHX2; 8	MIA; 5	**12th**	**64**	
1986	Galles Racing	8	Lola T86/00	Brabham-Honda V8t					POR; 7	MEA; 22	CLE; 14	TOR; 14	MIS1; 4	POC; 12	MDO; 20			ROA; 22				**12th**	**64**	
1987	Galles Racing	15	March 87C	Brabham-Honda V8t	LBH; 16	PHX; 8	INDY; 24	MIL; 12	POR; 9	MEA; 4	CLE; 22	TOR; DNS	MIS; 8	POC; 2	ROA; 2	MDO; 7	NAZ; 12	LS; 5	MIA; 3			**8th**	**90**	
1989	Team Penske	1	Penske PC-18	Chevrolet 265A V8t	PHX	LBH	INDY; Wth	MIL	DET	POR; 14	CLE	MEA	TOR	MIS	POC	MDO	ROA	NAZ	LS			**39th**	**0**	
1990	Truesports	21	Lola T89/00	Judd AV V8t	PHX	LBH	INDY; 19	MIL	DET	POR	CLE	MEA	TOR	MIS	DEN	VAN	MDO	ROA	NAZ	LS		**41st**	**0**	
1991	Truesports	21	Truesports 91C	Judd AV V8t	SRF	LBH	PHX	INDY; 20	MIL	DET	POR	CLE	MEA	TOR	MIS	DEN	VAN	MDO	ROA	NAZ	LS	**45th**	**0**	
1993	Team Menard	27	Lola T93/00	Menard V6t	SRF	PHX	LBH	INDY; 26	MIL	DET	POR	CLE	TOR	MIS	NHA	ROA	VAN	MDO	NAZ	LS		**50th**	**0**	
1994	Team Menard	59	Lola T93/00	Menard V6t	SRF	PHX	LBH	INDY; DNQ	MIL	DET	POR	CLE	TOR	MIS	MDO	NHA	VAN	ROA	NAZ	LS		NC	-	

==== Indianapolis 500 ====
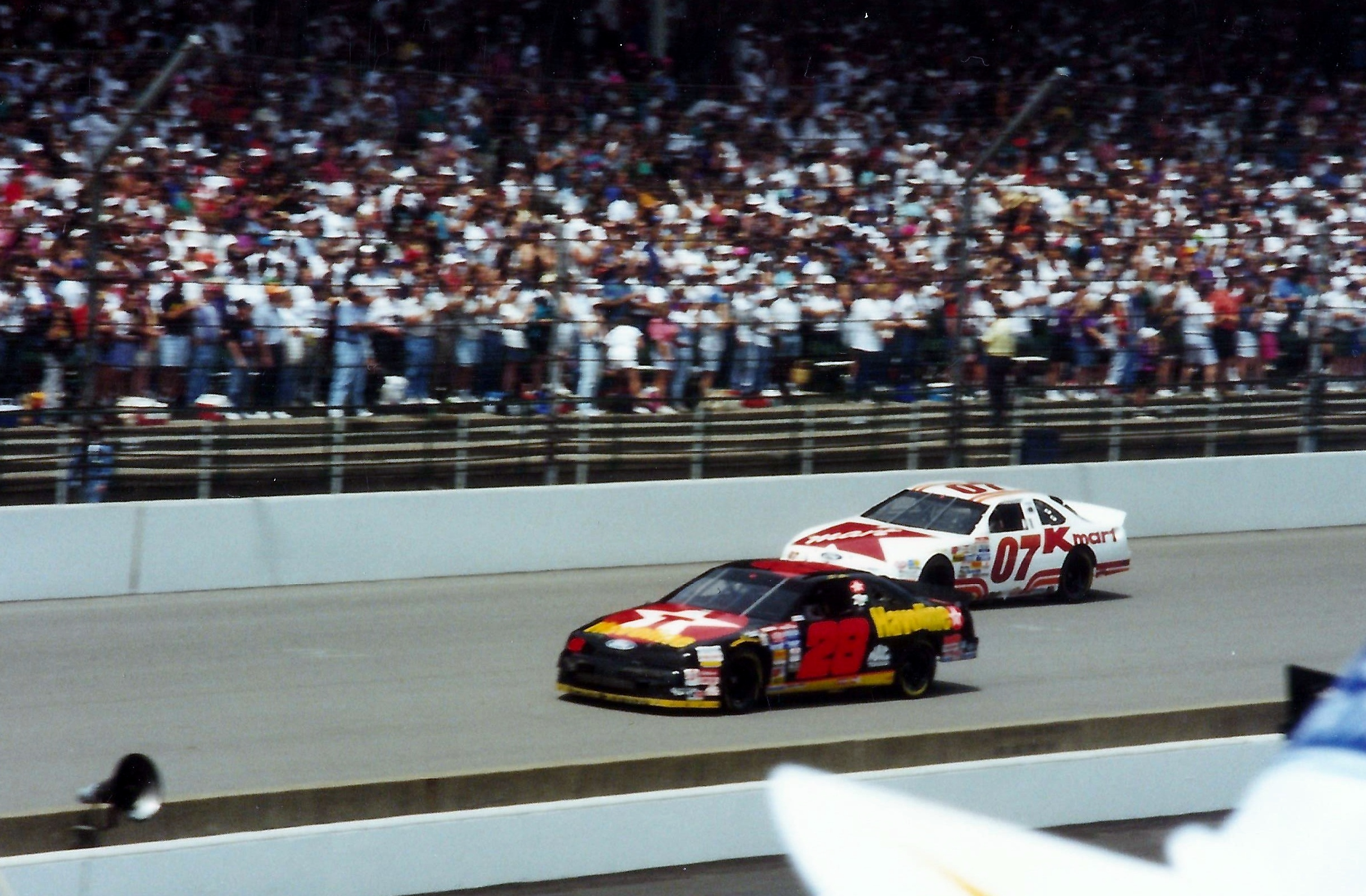
Brabham (#07) at the 1994 Brickyard 400.

Year	Chassis	Engine	Start	Finish	Team
1981	Penske PC-9	Ford Cosworth DFX	15	5	Kraco Racing
1982	March 82C	Ford Cosworth DFX	20	28	Bignotti-Cotter
1983	Penske PC-10	Ford Cosworth DFX	26	4	Team VDS
1984	March 84C	Ford Cosworth DFX	8	33	Kraco Racing
1985	March 85C	Ford Cosworth DFX	9	19	Galles Racing
1986	Lola T86/00	Ford Cosworth DFX	20	12	Galles Racing
1987	March 87C	Brabham-Honda	14	24	Galles Racing
1989	Penske PC-18	Chevrolet 265A	Withdrew		Team Penske
1990	Lola T89/00	Judd AV	19	19	Truesports
1991	Truesports 91C	Judd AV	22	20	Truesports
1993	Lola T93/00	Menard V6 (t/c)	29	26	Team Menard
1994	Lola T93/00	Menard V6 (t/c)	DNQ		Team Menard

=== Complete 24 Hours of Le Mans results ===
Year	Team	Co-drivers	Car	Class	Laps	Pos.	Class pos.
1989	(Japan) Nissan Motorsport	(United States) Chip Robinson (Netherlands) Arie Luyendyk	Nissan R89C	C1	250	DNF	DNF
1990	(United States) Nissan Performance Technology Inc.	(United States) Chip Robinson (Republic of Ireland) Derek Daly	Nissan R90CK	C1	251	DNF	DNF
1993	(France) Peugeot Talbot Sport	(France) Éric Hélary (France) Christophe Bouchut	Peugeot 905 Evo 1B	C1	375	**1st**	**1st**

==== V8 Supercar results ====
Year	Team	1	2	3	4	5	6	7	8	9	10	11	12	13	Final pos	Points
1999	Ford Tickford Racing	ECK	ADL	PTH	PHI	HDV	SAN	CDR	SYM	WIN	OPR	QLD; 8	BAT; 10		31st	360
2000	Larkham Motor Sport Rod Nash Racing	PHI	PTH	ADL	ECK	HDV	CAN	QLD	WIN	OPK	CDR	QLD; Ret	SAN	BAT; Ret	NC	0
2001	Steven Ellery Racing	PHI	ADL	ECK	HDV	CAN	PTH	CDR	OPK	QLD; 6	WIN	BAT; 7	PUK	SAN	36th	565

==== Complete Bathurst 1000 results ====
Year	Car#	Team	Co-drivers	Car	Class	Laps	Pos.	Class pos.
1974	31	(Australia) WA Fisher (Holdings) Pty Ltd	(Australia) Bernie Haehnle	Mazda RX-3	2001 – 3000cc	151	8th	**3rd**
1975	36	(Australia) B S Stillwell Ford & Co Pty Ltd	(Australia) Mike Stillwell	Ford Escort RS2000	B	141	12th	5th
1977	4	(Australia) John Goss Racing Pty Limited	(Australia) Jack Brabham	Ford XC Falcon GS500 Hardtop	3001cc – 6000cc	141	18th	9th
1993	35	(Australia) Peter Jackson Racing	(Australia) David Parsons	Ford EB Falcon	A	154	6th	6th
1997*	83	BMW Motorsport Australia	(Australia) David Brabham	BMW 320i	A	161	**1st**	**1st**
1998	25	(Australia) Longhurst Racing	(Australia) Tony Longhurst	Ford EL Falcon	OC	157	8th	8th
1999	6	(Australia) Ford Tickford Racing	(Australia) Neal Bates	Ford AU Falcon		160	10th	10th
2000	54	(Australia) Rod Nash Racing	(Australia) Cameron McConville	Holden VT Commodore		105	DNF	DNF
2001	31	(Australia) Steven Ellery Racing	(Australia) Steven Ellery	Ford AU Falcon		161	7th	7th

* Super Touring race

==== Complete Sandown 500 results ====
Year	Car#	Team	Co-drivers	Car	Class	Laps	Pos.	Class pos.
1993	35	(Australia) Peter Jackson Racing	(Australia) David Parsons	Ford EB Falcon	V8	161	**1st**	**1st**
1994	23	(Australia) Diet Coke Racing	(Australia) Paul Morris	Holden VP Commodore	V8	94	NC	NC
1998	25	(Australia) Longhurst Racing	(Australia) Tony Longhurst	Ford EL Falcon	OC	7	DNF	DNF

==== Complete Australian Super Touring Championship results ====
Year	Team	Car	1	2	3	4	5	6	7	8	9	10	11	12	13	14	15	16	DC	Pts
1995	Diet Coke BMW Motorsport	BMW 318i	PHI; 1; 6	PHI; 2; 3	ORA; 1; 2	ORA; 2; 1	SYM; 1; 2	SYM; 2; 1	CAL; 1; 1	CAL; 2; 2	MAL; 1; 1	MAL; 2; 1	LAK; 1; 2	LAK; 2; 11	WIN; 1; 3	WIN; 2; 2	EAS; 1; 3	EAS; 2 Ret	2nd	232
1996	BMW Motorsport	BMW 318i	AMA; 1; 4	AMA; 2; 4	LAK; 1 Ret	LAK; 2; 4	AMA; 1; 3	AMA; 2; 4	MAL; 1; 4	MAL; 2; 3	WIN; 1; 1	WIN; 2; 5	PHI; 1; 5	PHI; 2; 5	LAK; 1; 2	LAK; 2 Ret	ORA; 1 Ret	ORA; 2; 5	4th	114
1997	BMW Motorsport	BMW 320i	LAK; 1; 2	LAK; 2; 2	PHI; 1; 5	PHI; 2; 1	CAL; 1; 2	CAL; 2; 1	AMA; 1; 4	AMA; 1; 3	WIN; 1; 8	WIN; 2; 3	MAL; 1 Ret	MAL; 2; 2	LAK; 1; 2	LAK; 2; 2	AMA; 1; 1	AMA; 2; 3	2nd	171

=== NASCAR ===
(key) (Bold – Pole position awarded by qualifying time. Italics – Pole position earned by points standings or practice time. * – Most laps led.)

==== Winston Cup Series ====
NASCAR Winston Cup Series results
Year	Team	No.	Make	1	2	3	4	5	6	7	8	9	10	11	12	13	14	15	16	17	18	19	20	21	22	23	24	25	26	27	28	29	30	31	NWCC	Pts	Ref
1994	Kranefuss-Haas Racing	07	Ford	DAY	CAR	RCH	ATL	DAR	BRI	NWS	MAR	TAL	SON	CLT	DOV	POC	MCH	DAY	NHA	POC	TAL	IND; 38	GLN	MCH	BRI	DAR	RCH	DOV	MAR	NWS	CLT	CAR	PHO	ATL	76th	49	

Sporting positions
Preceded by Bill Alsup	US Formula Super Vee; Champion; 1981	Succeeded by Peter Kuhn
Preceded by Patrick Tambay	Can-Am Champion; 1981	Succeeded by Al Unser Jr.
Preceded by Chip Robinson	IMSA GT champion 1988-1991	Succeeded by Juan Manuel Fangio II
Preceded by Derek Warwick; Yannick Dalmas; Mark Blundell	Winner of the 24 Hours of Le Mans; 1993 with: Christophe Bouchut; Éric Hélary	Succeeded by Yannick Dalmas; Hurley Haywood; Mauro Baldi
Preceded by Craig Lowndes; Greg Murphy	Winner of the Bathurst 1000; 1997 (with David Brabham)	Succeeded by Rickard Rydell; Jim Richards
