= March 77S =

Sports prototype race car

- Category: Group 6

Technical specifications
- Chassis: fibreglass body on aluminium monocoque
- Suspension: double wishbones, push-rod actuated coil springs over shock absorbers, anti-roll bar (front) twin lower links, single upper links, trailing arms, coil springs over dampers, anti-roll bar (rear)
- Engine: Hart 420R 2.0 L (122.0 cu in) DOHC I4 naturally-aspirated mid-engined
- Transmission: Hewland FT200 5-speed manual
- Power: ~ 290 hp (220 kW)
- Weight: 575 kg (1,268 lb)

Competition history
- Debut: 1977 Can-Am St. Jovite

The March 77S was a Group 6 prototype race car, designed, developed and built by British manufacturer March Engineering, for sports car racing, in 1977. It was essentially a modified version and evolution of both the March 74S and the March 75S. It competed in the revived Can-Am series, entering in the Under 2-Liter class for the 1977 championship.
