= 1985 Can-Am season =

Seasons
- ← 1984 1986 →

The 1985 Can Am season was the eighteenth and penultimate running of the Sports Car Club of America's prototype series and the ninth running of the revived series. For the first time in series history, no major drivers would compete in the series. The dominant manufacturers were Chevrolet, BMW, and Hart. The dominant chassis were Frissbee-Lola, March, Lola, Frissbee, Osella, and Ralt. Rick Miaskiewicz was declared champion, with 81 points and three wins.

Lou Sell won the two liter class in his March BMW. This would also mark the final year of the two liter class.

== Results ==
Round	Circuit	Winning driver	Team	Car
1	Mosport Park	(Canada) Horst Kroll	(Canada) Kroll Auto Service	Frissbee-Chevrolet
2	Lime Rock	(United States) Bruce MacInnes	(United States) Claridge Racing	Lola-Chevrolet
3	Lime Rock	(United States) Rick Miaskiewicz	(United States) Mosquito Autosport	Frissbee-Chevrolet
4	Mosport Park	(United States) Rick Miaskiewicz	(United States) Mosquito Autosport	Frissbee-Chevrolet
5	St. Louis	(United States) Rick Miaskiewicz	(United States) Mosquito Autosport	Frissbee-Chevrolet
6	St. Petersburg	(United States) Lou Sell	(United States) Sell Racing	March-BMW
