= 1986 Can-Am season =

Seasons
- ← 1985 1987 →

The 1986 Can-Am season was the nineteenth running of the Sports Car Club of Americas prototype series, and the tenth running of the revived series. The dominant manufacturers were Cosworth, BMW, and Volkswagen for the first time with a third-place finish at Summit Point. The dominant chassis were Lola, March, Oscella, Yorkshire, Frissbee-Lola, and Frissbee. After 1986, Can Am would become the Can Am Teams championship, using modified CART March 86Cs. In 1989, the name was again revived with a spec Shelby series. Horst Kroll was declared champion.

The season did, however, introduce a young Paul Tracy, who won the final round at Mosport at the age of seventeen.

== Results ==
| Round | Circuit | Winning driver | Team | Car |
|---|---|---|---|---|
| 1 | Mosport | (Canada) Horst Kroll | (Canada) Kroll Racing | Frissbee-Chevrolet |
| 2 | Summit Point | (United States) Bill Tempero | (United States) Texas American Racing Team | March-Chevrolet |
| 3 | St. Louis | (United States) Lou Sell | (United States) Sell Racing | March-BMW |
| 4 | Mosport | (Canada) Paul Tracy | (Canada) Kroll Racing | Frissbee-Chevrolet |
