= 1977 Can-Am season =

North American auto racing season

Seasons
- ← 1974 1978 →

The 1977 Can Am season was the tenth running of the Sports Car Club of America's prototype-based series.

Despite the revived name, however, the new series was entirely unrelated to the previous series which had folded in 1974.

Most of the competitive cars were based on Formula 5000 chassis. Also, it was the first time under 2-litre cars were allowed to race, but with no separate class.

Patrick Tambay was the season champion, winning six of the nine races that year for Carl Haas.

While Lola chassis dominated the series, a Chevrolet powered Schkee DB1 driven by Tom Klausler won the first race at Mont Tremblant.

Other competitive cars included the 1974 champions Shadow, who now used Dodge engines and Wolf with a Dallara-built chassis.

While Chevrolet was not the only engine supplier, they swept the entire season.

This season also marked a resurgence of interest in SCCA events, with Can Am accompanying F5000 and the Trans Am Series seeing a mild resurgence in the eighties.

It is indeed very hard to find any available source containing the points scoring system for this Can-Am season.

== Results ==
Rnd	Circuit	O2L Winning Team	U2L Winning Team
Rnd	Circuit	O2L Winning Driver	U2L Winning Driver
Rnd	Circuit	O2L Winning Car	U2L Winning Car
1	Mont-Tremblant	(United States) #6 Schkee Cars	(Canada) #60 Dave Johnson
1	Mont-Tremblant	(United States) Tom Klauser	(Canada) Dave Johnson
1	Mont-Tremblant	Schkee DB1-Chevrolet	Lola T290-Cosworth
2	Laguna Seca	(United States) #77 Briggs Racing	(United States) #94 Harald Kirberg
2	Laguna Seca	(United States) Don Breidenbach	(United States) Harald Kirberg
2	Laguna Seca	Lola T332-Chevrolet	Kirberg KK2-Porsche
3	Watkins Glen	(United States) #1 Carl A. Haas Racing	(United States) #79 Bob Brown Racing
3	Watkins Glen	(France) Patrick Tambay	(United States) Bob Brown
3	Watkins Glen	Lola T333 CS-Chevrolet	March 77S-Hart
4	Road America	(United States) #4 VDS Racing	(United States) #79 Bob Brown Racing
4	Road America	(United Kingdom) Peter Gethin	(United States) Bob Brown
4	Road America	Lola T333 CS-Chevrolet	March 77S-Hart
5	Mid-Ohio	(United States) #1 Carl A. Haas Racing	(United States) #17 Great Plains Racing
5	Mid-Ohio	(France) Patrick Tambay	(United States) Gordon Smiley
5	Mid-Ohio	Lola T333 CS-Chevrolet	Lola T292-Ford
6	Mosport	(United States) #1 Carl A. Haas Racing	(United States) #69 United Racing Ltd.
6	Mosport	(France) Patrick Tambay	(United States) Mike Hall
6	Mosport	Lola T333 CS-Chevrolet	Lola T294-Ford
7	Trois-Rivieres	(United States) #1 Carl A. Haas Racing	(United States) #25 Red Roof Inns
7	Trois-Rivieres	(France) Patrick Tambay	(United States) Bobby Rahal
7	Trois-Rivieres	Lola T333 CS-Chevrolet	Lola T296-Hart
8	Sears Point	(United States) #1 Carl A. Haas Racing	(United States) #25 Red Roof Inns
8	Sears Point	(France) Patrick Tambay	(United States) Jim Trueman
8	Sears Point	Lola T333 CS-Chevrolet	Lola T296-Hart
9	Riverside	(United States) #1 Carl A. Haas Racing	(United States) #25 Red Roof Inns
9	Riverside	(France) Patrick Tambay	(United States) Jim Trueman
9	Riverside	Lola T333 CS-Chevrolet	Lola T296-Hart
