= 1980 Can-Am season =

Can Am Series season

Seasons
- ← 1979 1981 →

The 1980 Can Am Series season was the thirteenth running of the Sports Car Club of America's prototype based series and the fourth running of the revived series. Patrick Tambay was declared champion, winning six of the ten rounds and finishing third at Riverside. Chevrolet again swept the season. Lola, Holbert, and Prophet were the dominant chassis suppliers, with Intrepid finishing second at Watkins Glen and Frisbee finishing first at Laguna Seca.

The two liter class went to Gary Gove in his Ralt RT2.

The scoring system was 9-6-4-3-2-1 points awarded to the first six classified finishers. All results counted.

== Results ==
Round	Circuit	Winning driver	Team	Car
1	Sears Point	(France) Patrick Tambay	(United States) Carl A. Haas Racing Team	Lola-Chevrolet
2	Mid-Ohio	(France) Patrick Tambay	(United States) Carl A. Haas Racing Team	Lola-Chevrolet
3	Mosport	(France) Patrick Tambay	(United States) Carl A. Haas Racing Team	Lola-Chevrolet
4	Watkins Glen	(France) Patrick Tambay	(United States) Carl A. Haas Racing Team	Lola-Chevrolet
5	Road America	(United States) Al Holbert	(United States) Holbert Racing	Holbert-Chevrolet
6	Brainerd	(France) Patrick Tambay	(United States) Carl A. Haas Racing Team	Lola-Chevrolet
7	Trois-Rivières	(France) Patrick Tambay	(United States) Carl A. Haas Racing Team	Lola-Chevrolet
8	Road Atlanta	(Australia) Geoff Brabham	(United States) Racing Team VDS	Lola-Chevrolet
9	Laguna Seca	(United States) Al Unser	(United States) Brad Frisselle Racing	Frissbee-Chevrolet
10	Riverside	(United States) Al Holbert	(United States) Holbert Racing	Holbert-Chevrolet
