= Patrick Tambay =

French racing driver (1949–2022)

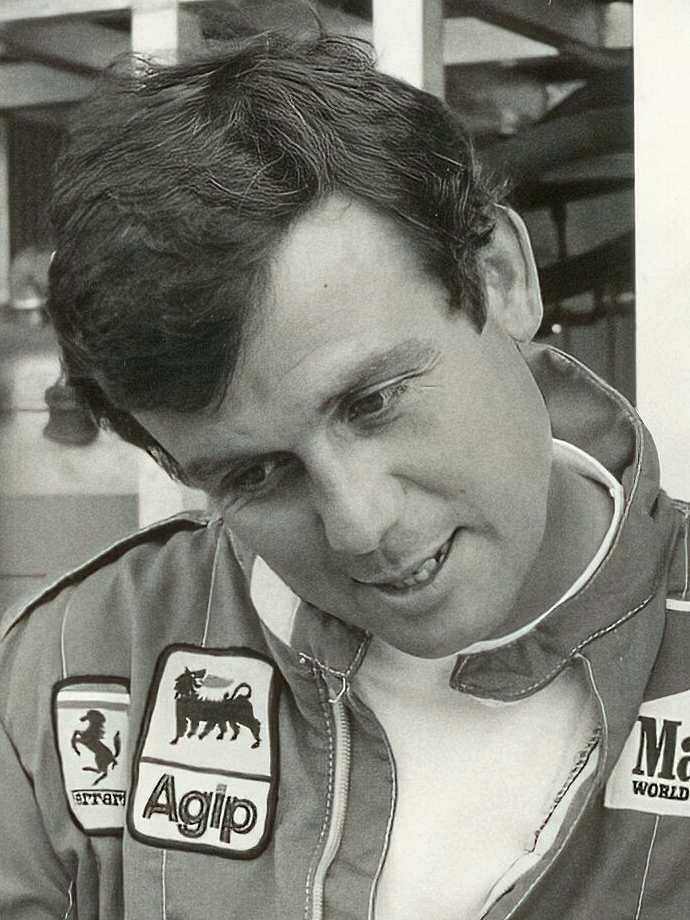
- Tambay at the 1983 Dutch Grand Prix
- Born: Patrick Daniel Tambay; 25 June 1949; Paris, France
- Died: 4 December 2022 (aged 73); Paris, France
- Children: 3, including Adrien

Formula One World Championship career
- Nationality: (France) French
- Active years: 1977–1979, 1981–1986
- Team(s): Surtees, Theodore, McLaren, Ligier, Ferrari, Renault, Haas Lola
- Entries: 123 (114 starts)
- Championships: 0
- Wins: 2
- Podiums: 11
- Career points: 103
- Pole positions: 5
- Fastest laps: 2
- First entry: 1977 French Grand Prix
- First win: 1982 German Grand Prix
- Last win: 1983 San Marino Grand Prix
- Last entry: 1986 Australian Grand Prix

24 Hours of Le Mans career
- Years: 1976–1977, 1981, 1989
- Teams: Renault, Rondeau, Jaguar
- Best finish: 4th (1989)
- Class wins: 0

Patrick Daniel Tambay (French pronunciation: [pa.tʁik da.njɛl tɑ̃.bɛ]; 25 June 1949 – 4 December 2022) was a French racing driver, broadcaster and politician, who competed in Formula One from 1977 to 1986. Tambay won two Formula One Grands Prix across nine seasons.

Born and raised in Paris, Tambay gained training as a racing driver at the Winfield Racing School in 1971. Between 1977 and 1981, he raced for an assortment of teams including Surtees, Theodore, Ligier and McLaren with mixed results; he additionally won two Can-Am titles under Carl Haas in 1977 and 1980. Tambay was hired by Ferrari after the death of Gilles Villeneuve in 1982, taking his maiden victory four races later at the German Grand Prix. His second and final victory came the following season in San Marino, finishing the season a career-best fourth in the World Drivers' Championship. In 1984, Tambay moved to Renault, before ending his Formula One career at Haas Lola, having achieved two wins, five pole positions, two fastest laps and 11 podiums.

Tambay competed in various forms of motorsport following his departure from Formula One, including the 24 Hours of Le Mans, the World Sportscar Championship, and the Dakar Rally.

== Racing career ==
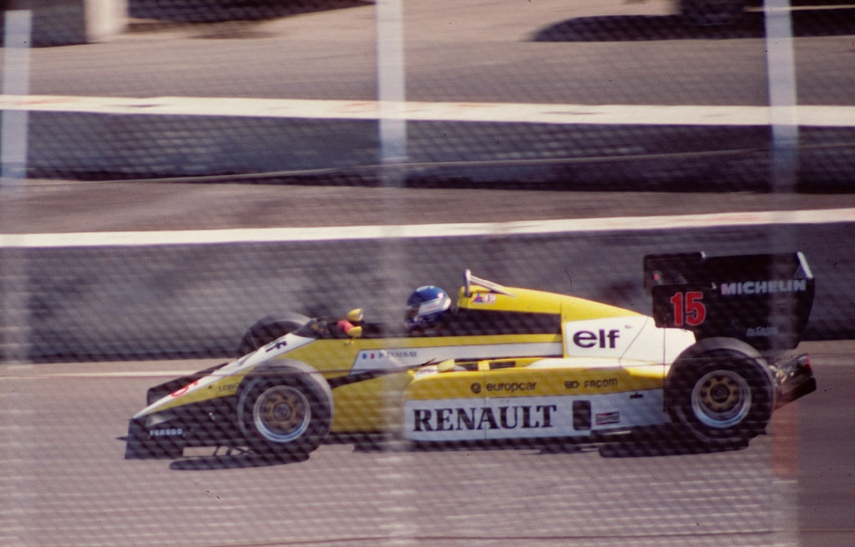
Tambay at the 1984 Dallas Grand Prix where, like many others, he retired after hitting a wall.

Early in his career, Tambay was a part of Formula 5000 with the team run by Carl Haas.

In 1977, winning the Can Am championship with Haas, Tambay debuted in Formula One on a one-off basis with Surtees, driving in only one session at the 1977 French Grand Prix before spending the rest of the season with Theodore. This partnership proved fruitful, with Theodore also bringin Tambay to Japan for an appearance at Fuji Speedway for the Japanese Formula 2000 championship. Before the race started, Tambay received news that he had been selected as a co-driver by Alpine-Renault for the Renault-Alpine team, which meant he was under pressure to leave Japan as soon as possible. Distracted, and with an engine which was not performing well, Tambay spun off the track on the 13th lap and hastily left with a "cheerful" look on his face - to the chagrin of the organizers.

After Theodore, Tambay moved to McLaren to race Formula One full-time for the 1978 and 1979 seasons. In 1980, he returned to Can Am with the Lola team run by Carl Haas, immediately winning early in the season and then winning his second Can-Am championship.

In 1981, Tambay returned to F1, first driving for the Theodore team then finishing the season with Ligier.

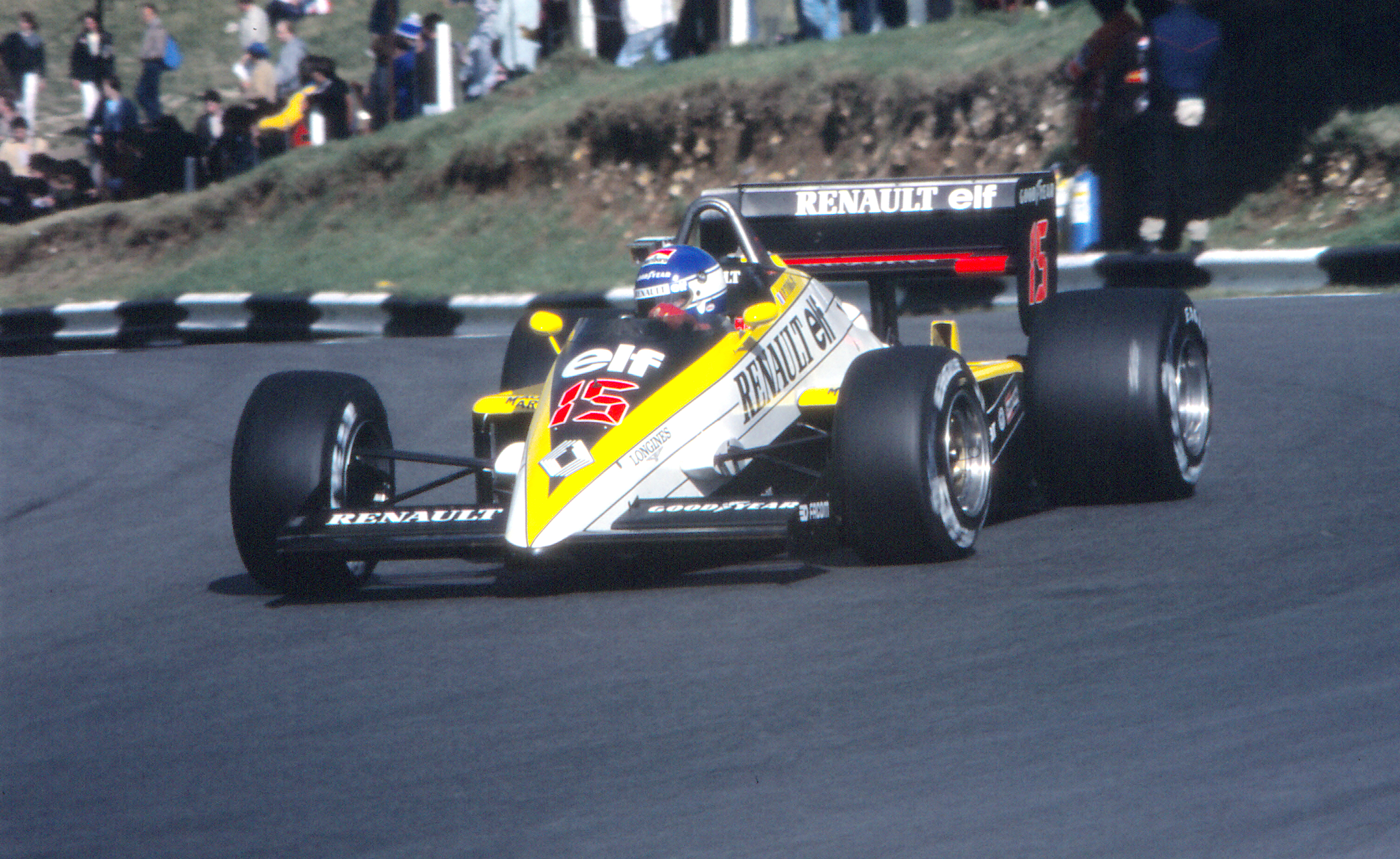
Tambay during practice for the 1985 European Grand Prix

In 1982, Tambay was offered a drive with Arrows by team boss Jackie Oliver to replace the injured Marc Surer in the season-opening South African Grand Prix. He arrived at the track and, when faced with the ongoing turmoil and the possibility of a drivers' strike, he soon left and did not take part in the race. Later in 1982, he was offered a place with the Scuderia Ferrari after the death of his close friend Gilles Villeneuve. He won his first Grand Prix at the German Grand Prix that year after Didier Pironi was injured in qualifying, in his fourth race for Ferrari. He took his second and last Grand Prix win in 1983 at Imola; driving with Villeneuve's No. 27, he won after Riccardo Patrese crashed near the end of the race.

Despite finishing fourth in the 1983 World Championship (with team mate René Arnoux finishing 3rd enabling Ferrari to win the Constructors' Championship), Tambay was dropped by the Scuderia at the end of 1983 in favor of Italian Michele Alboreto. Tambay then moved from one factory team to the other in Formula One at the time, Renault who had finished second in the 1983 Constructors' Championship and second in the Drivers' with fellow Frenchman Alain Prost. Unfortunately for Tambay, after 1983 the factory Renault teams fortunes would go on the downslide and he would spend a somewhat fruitless two seasons before Renault pulled the plug on its factory team with his best results over the 1984 and 1985 seasons being a single pole position and subsequent second place in the 1984 French Grand Prix at Dijon.

For what would prove to be his final season in Formula One, Tambay was then reunited with his old boss Carl Haas racing in the Haas Lola F1 team in 1986 where he spent an even more fruitless season alongside 1980 World Champion, Australian driver Alan Jones despite Haas having exclusive use of the new Cosworth designed and built Ford TEC V6 turbo engine. Tambay's best result driving either the underpowered Hart engined Lola THL1 or the Ford powered Lola THL2 (which itself was somewhat underpowered compared to its rivals from BMW, Honda, Renault, Ferrari and TAG-Porsche) was a lone fifth place in the THL2 in the 1986 Austrian Grand Prix at the Österreichring (Jones having an equally hard time of it in 1986, finished fourth). Although he regularly out-qualified his former World Championship winning team mate, his two points in Austria would be Tambay's only points of the 1986 season and thus his last scored in Formula One. With the loss of the lucrative sponsorship from American company Beatrice Foods in mid-1986, Carl Haas shut his Formula One team down at the end of the season and Tambay, unable to find a competitive drive to continue in 1987, retired from the sport.

In 1987, Tambay formed his own sports promotion company in Switzerland, but gave this up in 1989 to return to racing. In 1989, he drove a Jaguar in the World Sportscar Championship and went on to finish fourth in the Le Mans 24 Hours. He then took up desert rally raiding, finishing twice in the top three on the Paris-Dakar. Additionally, he was involved in ice races and the Tour de Corse jet ski race.

== Later life and death ==
After retiring from full-time racing, Tambay worked as a commentator for French television. He also served as the deputy mayor of Le Cannet, a suburb of Cannes. He was the godfather to 1997 World Champion Jacques Villeneuve, while his son Adrien raced in the DTM championship between 2012 and 2016. After suffering from Parkinson's disease for several years, Tambay died on 4 December 2022 at home, at the age of 73. His son Adrien announced his death.

== Racing record ==
=== Career summary ===
Season	Series	Team	Races	Wins	Poles	F/Laps	Podiums	Points	Position
1974	European Formula Two	Écurie Elf	10	0	0	0	0	11	7th
1975	European Formula Two	March Engineering	14	1	3	0	5	36	**2nd**
1976	European Formula Two	Automobiles Martini	12	1	2	1	7	39	**3rd**
1976	SCCA Continental Championship	Theodore Racing Hong Kong	1	0	0	0	0	2	21st
1977	Formula One	Theodore Racing Hong Kong	7	0	0	0	0	5	18th
1977	Can-Am	Carl A. Haas Racing	7	6	6	4	6	159	**1st**
1977	European Formula Two	Ardmore Racing	2	0	1	0	0	0	NC
1977	Japanese Formula 2000	Theodore Racing	1	0	0	0	0	0	NC
1978	Formula One	Marlboro Team McLaren Löwenbräu Team McLaren	15	0	0	0	0	8	14th
1978	European Formula Two	Chevron Cars	1	0	0	0	0	0	NC^{‡}
1979	Formula One	Marlboro Team McLaren Löwenbräu Team McLaren	13	0	0	0	0	0	NC
1980	Can-Am	Carl A. Haas Racing	9	6	3	3	7	61	**1st**
1981	Formula One	Équipe Talbot Gitanes	8	0	0	0	0	1	19th
1981	Formula One	Theodore Racing Team	6	0	0	0	0	1	19th
1981	24 Hours of Le Mans	Oceanic Jean Rondeau	1	0	0	0	0	N/A	DNF
1982	Formula One	Ferrari	6	1	0	0	3	25	7th
1983	Formula One	Ferrari	15	1	4	1	5	40	4th
1984	Formula One	Équipe Renault Elf	15	0	1	1	1	11	11th
1985	Formula One	Équipe Renault Elf	15	0	0	0	2	11	12th
1986	Formula One	Team Haas (USA) Ltd.	14	0	0	0	0	2	15th
1989	World Sportscar Championship	Silk Cut Jaguar	8	0	1	0	1	30	8th
2005	Grand Prix Masters	Team Lixxus	1	0	0	0	0	N/A	–
2006	Grand Prix Masters	Team Lixxus	2	0	0	0	0	N/A	–

^{‡} Graded drivers not eligible for European Formula Two Championship points.

=== Complete European Formula Two Championship results ===
(key) (Races in bold indicate pole position; races in italics indicate fastest lap)

Year	Entrant	Chassis	Engine	1	2	3	4	5	6	7	8	9	10	11	12	13	14	Pos.	Pts
1974	Ecurie Elf	Alpine A367	BMW	BAR; 10	HOC; 5	PAU; Ret	SAL; 4	HOC; Ret	MUG; NC	KAR; Ret	PER; Ret	HOC; 4	VAL; 4					7th	11
1975	March Engineering	March 752	BMW	EST; Ret	THR; 2	**HOC**; Ret	NÜR; 2	PAU; Ret	HOC; Ret	SAL; 15	ROU; 2	MUG; Ret	**PER**; Ret	SIL; 4	ZOL; 2	**NOG**; 1	VAL; Ret	2nd	36
1976	Automobiles Martini	Martini Mk 19	Renault	HOC; 3	THR; 3	VLL; 2	SAL; 3	**PAU**; Ret	HOC; 3	ROU; Ret	MUG; 3	**PER**; Ret	EST; 16	NOG; 1	HOC; DSQ			3rd	39
1977	Ardmore Racing	Chevron B40	Hart	SIL	THR	HOC	NÜR	VLL	**PAU**; Ret	MUG	ROU; Ret	NOG	PER	MIS	EST	DON		NC	0
1978	Chevron Cars	Chevron B42	Hart	THR	HOC	NÜR	PAU; 6	MUG	VLL	ROU	DON	NOG	PER	MIS	HOC			NC	0^{‡}

^{‡} Graded drivers not eligible for European Formula Two Championship points

=== Complete Formula One World Championship results ===
(key) (Races in bold indicate pole position; Races in italics indicate fastest lap)

Year	Entrant	Chassis	Engine	1	2	3	4	5	6	7	8	9	10	11	12	13	14	15	16	17	WDC	Pts
1977	Durex Team Surtees	Surtees TS19	Ford Cosworth DFV 3.0 V8	ARG	BRA	RSA	USW	ESP	MON	BEL	SWE	FRA; DNQ									18th	5
1977	Theodore Racing Hong Kong	Ensign N177	Ford Cosworth DFV 3.0 V8										GBR; Ret	GER; 6	AUT; Ret	NED; 5	ITA; Ret	USA; DNQ	CAN; 5	JPN; Ret	18th	5
1978	Marlboro Team McLaren	McLaren M26	Ford Cosworth DFV 3.0 V8	ARG; 6	BRA; Ret	RSA; Ret	USW; 12	MON; 7	BEL	ESP; Ret	SWE; 4	FRA; 9	GBR; 6	GER; Ret	AUT; Ret	NED; 9	ITA; 5				14th	8
1978	Löwenbräu Team McLaren	McLaren M26	Ford Cosworth DFV 3.0 V8															USA; 6	CAN; 8			
1979	Löwenbräu Team McLaren	McLaren M28	Ford Cosworth DFV 3.0 V8				USW; Ret														NC	0
1979	Marlboro Team McLaren	McLaren M28	Ford Cosworth DFV 3.0 V8	ARG; Ret		RSA; 10		ESP; 13													NC	0
1979	Marlboro Team McLaren	McLaren M26	Ford Cosworth DFV 3.0 V8		BRA; Ret				BEL; DNQ												NC	0
1979	Marlboro Team McLaren	McLaren M28B	Ford Cosworth DFV 3.0 V8							MON; DNQ											NC	0
1979	Marlboro Team McLaren	McLaren M28C	Ford Cosworth DFV 3.0 V8								FRA; 10	GBR; 7									NC	0
1979	Marlboro Team McLaren	McLaren M29	Ford Cosworth DFV 3.0 V8										GER; Ret	AUT; 10	NED; Ret	ITA; Ret	CAN; Ret	USA; Ret			NC	0
1981	Theodore Racing Team	Theodore TY01	Ford Cosworth DFV 3.0 V8	USW; 6	BRA; 10	ARG; Ret	SMR; 11	BEL; DNQ	MON; 7	ESP; 13											19th	1
1981	Équipe Talbot Gitanes	Talbot Ligier JS17	Matra MS81 3.0 V12								FRA; Ret	GBR; Ret	GER; Ret	AUT; Ret	NED; Ret	ITA; Ret	CAN; Ret	CPL; Ret			19th	1
1982	Ferrari	Ferrari 126C2	Ferrari 021 1.5 V6 t	RSA	BRA	USW	SMR	BEL	MON	DET	CAN	NED; 8	GBR; 3	FRA; 4	GER; 1	AUT; 4	SUI; DNS	ITA; 2	CPL; DNS		7th	25
1983	Ferrari	Ferrari 126C2/B	Ferrari 021 1.5 V6 t	BRA; 5	**USW**; Ret	FRA; 4	SMR; 1	MON; 4	BEL; 2	DET; Ret	CAN; 3										4th	40
1983	Ferrari	Ferrari 126C3	Ferrari 021 1.5 V6 t									GBR; 3	**GER**; Ret	**AUT**; Ret	NED; 2	ITA; 4	EUR; Ret	**RSA**; Ret			4th	40
1984	Équipe Renault Elf	Renault RE50	Renault EF4 1.5 V6 t	BRA; 5	RSA; Ret	BEL; 7	SMR; Ret	**FRA**; 2	MON; Ret	CAN; WD	DET; Ret	DAL; Ret	GBR; 8	GER; 5	AUT; Ret	NED; 6	ITA; Ret	EUR; Ret	POR; 7		11th	11
1985	Équipe Renault Elf	Renault RE60	Renault EF4B 1.5 V6 t	BRA; 5	POR; 3	SMR; 3	MON; Ret	CAN; 7	DET; Ret												12th	11
1985	Équipe Renault Elf	Renault RE60B	Renault EF15 1.5 V6 t							FRA; 6	GBR; Ret	GER; Ret	AUT; 10	NED; Ret	ITA; 7	BEL; Ret	EUR; 12	RSA	AUS; Ret		12th	11
1986	Team Haas (USA) Ltd.	Lola THL1	Hart 415T 1.5 L4 t	BRA; Ret	ESP; 8	SMR; Ret															15th	2
1986	Team Haas (USA) Ltd.	Lola THL2	Ford Cosworth GBA 1.5 V6 t				MON; Ret	BEL; Ret	CAN; DNS	DET	FRA; Ret	GBR; Ret	GER; 8	HUN; 7	AUT; 5	ITA; Ret	POR; NC	MEX; Ret	AUS; NC		15th	2

=== 24 Hours of Le Mans results ===
Year	Team	Co-Drivers	Car	Class	Laps	Pos.	Class Pos.
1976	(France) Renault Sport	(France) Jean-Pierre Jabouille (France) José Dolhem	Renault Alpine A442	S 3.0	135	DNF	DNF
1977	(France) Équipe Renault Elf	(France) Jean-Pierre Jaussaud	Renault Alpine A442	S 3.0	158	DNF	DNF
1981	(France) Oceanic Jean Rondeau	(France) Henri Pescarolo	Rondeau M379-Ford Cosworth	2 +2.0	41	DNF	DNF
1989	(United Kingdom) Silk Cut Jaguar (United Kingdom) Tom Walkinshaw Racing	(Netherlands) Jan Lammers (United Kingdom) Andrew Gilbert-Scott	Jaguar XJR-9LM	C1	380	4th	4th

=== Complete Canadian-American Challenge Cup results ===
(key) (Races in bold indicate pole position) (Races in italics indicate fastest lap)

Year	Team	Car	Engine	1	2	3	4	5	6	7	8	9	10	Pos	Pts
1977	Carl A. Haas Racing	Lola T333CS	Chevrolet V8	MTR	LAG	**WGL**; 1	ROA; 4	**MOH**; 1	**MOS**; 1	**CTR**; 1	**SON**; 1	**RIV**; 1		1st	159
1980	Carl A. Haas Racing	Lola T530	Chevrolet V8	**SON**; 1	MOH; 1	**MOS**; 1	WGL; 1	ROA	BRA; 1	**CTR**; 1	ATL; 4	LAG; 18	**RIV**; 3	1st	61

=== Complete Grand Prix Masters results ===
(key) Races in bold indicate pole position, races in italics indicate fastest lap.

Year	Team	Chassis	Engine	1	2	3	4	5
2005	Team Lixxus	Delta Motorsport GPM	Nicholson McLaren 3.5 V8	RSA; 11				
2006	Team Lixxus	Delta Motorsport GPM	Nicholson McLaren 3.5 V8	QAT; 11	ITA; C	GBR; 11	MAL; C	RSA; C

== General and cited references ==
- Burbi, Massimo; Tambay, Patrick (2016). 27: Patrick Tambay – The Ferrari Years. Evro Publishing. ISBN 978-1910505120.

Sporting positions
Preceded by Jackie Oliver (1974)	Can-Am; Champion; 1977	Succeeded by Alan Jones
Preceded by Jacky Ickx	Can-Am; Champion; 1980	Succeeded by Geoff Brabham
