= 1981 Can-Am season =

Seasons
- ← 1980 1982 →

The 1981 Can Am series season was the fourteenth running of the Sports Car Club of America's prototype-based series, and the fifth running of the revived series. Geoff Brabham was declared champion, despite only winning two races. Chevrolet again dominated the season. The dominant chassis manufacturers were March, Lola, Holbert, Frissbee, and VDS. IndyCar drivers Al Unser and Bobby Rahal also podiumed at Road America and Mosport, respectively.

The two liter class went to Jim Trueman in his Ralt.

The scoring system was 90-60-40-30-20-10-9-8-7-6-5-4-3-2-1 points for the first fifteen classified drivers. All results counted.

== Results ==
Round	Circuit	Winning driver	Team	Car
1	Mosport	(Italy) Teo Fabi	(United States) Paul Newman Racing	March-Chevrolet
2	Mid-Ohio	(Italy) Teo Fabi	(United States) Paul Newman Racing	March-Chevrolet
3	Watkins Glen	(United States) Al Holbert	(United States) Holbert Racing	Holbert-Chevrolet
4	Road America	(Australia) Geoff Brabham	(United States) Racing Team VDS	Lola-Chevrolet
5	Edmonton	(Australia) Geoff Brabham	(United States) Racing Team VDS	VDS-Chevrolet
6	Trois-Rivières	(United States) Al Holbert	(United States) Holbert Racing	Holbert-Chevrolet
7	Mosport	(Italy) Teo Fabi	(United States) Paul Newman Racing	March-Chevrolet
8	Riverside	(United States) Al Holbert	(United States) Holbert Racing	Holbert-Chevrolet
9	Laguna Seca	(Italy) Teo Fabi	(United States) Paul Newman Racing	March-Chevrolet
10	Caesars Palace	(United States) Danny Sullivan	(United States) Garvin Brown Racing	Frissbee-Chevrolet
