= 1979 Can-Am season =

North American auto racing season

Seasons
- ← 1978 1980 →

The 1979 Can-Am season was the twelfth running of the Sports Car Club of America's prototype-based series and the third running of the revived series. Formula One legend Jacky Ickx was declared champion, winning five of the ten rounds and finishing second at Road Atlanta. Chevrolet again dominated the season. The top chassis builders were Lola, Prophet, and Spyder, with Vern Schuppan finishing third at Watkins Glen in an Elfin and Al Holbert finishing third at Road America in a Hogan.

1979 would also mark the introduction of a second class for prototypes with engines under 2000cc. That class was won by Tim Evans in his Lola T290.

== Results ==
The scoring system was 9-6-4-3-2-1 points awarded to the first six classified finishers. All results counted.

Round	Circuit	Date	Winning driver	Team	Car
1	(United States) Road Atlanta	May 6	(Finland) Keke Rosberg	(United States) Newman-Freeman Racing	Spyder-Chevrolet
2	(United States) Charlotte	May 20	(Belgium) Jacky Ickx	(United States) Carl A. Haas Racing Team	Lola-Chevrolet
3	(Canada) Mosport	June 3	(Belgium) Jacky Ickx	(United States) Carl A. Haas Racing Team	Lola-Chevrolet
4	(United States) Mid-Ohio	June 10	(Australia) Alan Jones	(United States) Carl A. Haas Racing Team	Lola-Chevrolet
5	(United States) Watkins Glen	July 8	(Finland) Keke Rosberg	(United States) Newman-Freeman Racing	Spyder-Chevrolet
6	(United States) Road America	July 22	(Belgium) Jacky Ickx	(United States) Carl A. Haas Racing Team	Lola-Chevrolet
7	(United States) Brainerd	August 19	(Belgium) Jacky Ickx	(United States) Carl A. Haas Racing Team	Lola-Chevrolet
8	(Canada) Trois-Rivières	September 2	(United States) Elliot Forbes-Robinson	(United States) Newman-Freeman Racing	Spyder-Chevrolet
9	(United States) Laguna Seca	October 14	(United States) Bobby Rahal	(United States) U.S. Racing	Prophet-Chevrolet
10	(United States) Riverside	October 28	(Belgium) Jacky Ickx	(United States) Carl A. Haas Racing Team	Lola-Chevrolet

FINAL STANDINGS

POSITION	DRIVER	COUNTRY	GPs	WINS	POINTS	ENTRANT	CAR-ENGINE
01	Jacky Ickx	Belgium	9	5	51	Carl A. Haas Racing Team	Lola T333CS-Chevrolet
02	Elliott Forbes-Robinson	United States	10	1	45	Newman-Freeman Racing	Spyder NF-11-Chevrolet
03	Geoff Lees	United Kingdom	10	0	32	Racing Team VDS	Lola T333CS-Chevrolet
04	Keke Rosberg	Finland	10	2	29	Newman-Freeman Racing	Spyder NF 11-Chevrolet
05	Bobby Rahal	United States	6	1	25	U.S. Racing	Prophet-Chevrolet
06	Al Holbert	United States	8	0	9	Hogan Racing Ltd.	Hogan HR 001-Chevrolet
06	Alan Jones	Australia	2	1	9	Carl A. Haas Racing Team	Lola T333CS-Chevrolet
08	Rocky Moran	United States	9	0	6	American Spirit Racing	Lola T333CS-Chevrolet
08	John Morton	United States	7	0	6	U.S. Racing; John Morton Racing	Prophet-Chevrolet; Lola T333CS-Chevrolet
08	Vern Schuppan	Australia	5	0	6	Theodore Racing Team	Elfin MR8A-Chevrolet
11	Bill Tempero	United States	9	0	5	Bill Tempero Racing	Lola T332C-Chevrolet
12	Bobby Brown	United States	9	0	4	Bobby Brown Racing	Lola T333CS-Chevrolet
13	Tim Evans	United States	10	0	3	Diversified Engineering Services	Lola T290-Ford
13	Horst Kroll	Canada	8	0	3	Horst Kroll Racing	Lola T332-Chevrolet; Lola T333CS-Chevrolet
13	John Gunn	United States	7	0	3	Gunn´s Godies	GG 5-Chevrolet
13	Randy Lewis	United States	3	0	3	Randy Lewis; Carl A. Haas Racing Team	Lola T332-Chevrolet
13	Geoff Brabham	Australia	2	0	3	Hogan Racing Ltd.	Hogan HR 001-Chevrolet
13	George Follmer	United States	2	0	3	U.S. Racing	Prophet-Chevrolet
13	Howdy Holmes	United States	1	0	3	Newman-Freeman Racing	Spyder NF 11-Chevrolet
20	Michael Allen	United States	6	0	1	Don Weber	Lola T332CS-Chevrolet
20	Tony Cicale	United States	4	0	1	Cicale Champion Racing	Ralt RT1 1/2-Hart
NC	Gary Gove	United States	10	0	0	Pete Lovely Volkswagen	Chevron B26-Ford
NC	Randolph Townsend	United States	6	0	0	Newman-Freeman Racing	Spyder NF 11-Chevrolet
NC	S. Peter Smith	United States	6	0	0	Red Roof Inns	Bobsy 2L-Ford
NC	Duane Eitel	United States	5	0	0	E-K Racing	Chevron B28-Chevrolet
NC	Robert J. Nelkin	United States	5	0	0	Robert J. Nelkin	Lola T333CS-Chevrolet
NC	Dean Dietrich	United States	4	0	0	Dean Dietrich	DRL Hawke 79
NC	E. B. Lunken	United States	4	0	0	E. B. Lunken	March 73S-BMW
NC	Howard Kelly	Canada	4	0	0	Howard Kelly	Lola T332 RNF-Chevrolet
NC	Leonard Janke	United States	4	0	0	Janke Auto Company	Lola T332-Chevrolet
NC	Michael Brayton	United States	4	0	0	Michael Brayton	Wolf Brayton 001-Chevrolet
NC	Chris Strong	United States	3	0	0	Chris Strong	Chevron B36-Ford
NC	Gerre Payvis	United States	3	0	0	Gerre Payvis	Lola T333CS-Chevrolet
NC	John McCormack	Australia	3	0	0	John McCormack	McLaren M23-Repco
NC	John Sorbello	United States	3	0	0	John Sorbello	Sorbello GM5-Chevrolet
NC	Bertil Roos	Suécia	2	0	0	Bertil Roos	Chevron B27-Ford
NC	Charlie Kemp	United States	2	0	0	Charlie Kemp	Lola T332-Chevrolet
NC	Chuck Smith	United States	2	0	0	Chuck Smith	Chevron B19/21-Ford
NC	Gary Hirsch	Canada	2	0	0	Gary Hirsch	Porsche 908/02
NC	Hurley Haywood	United States	2	0	0	Vasek Polak Racing	Chevron B21-BMW
NC	Jeff Miller	United States	2	0	0	Jeff Miller	Lola T496-Ford
NC	John Timken	United States	2	0	0	Essex Racing Service	Lola T296-Ford
NC	Mike Hall	United States	2	0	0	United Racing	Lola T294-Ford
NC	Price Cobb	United States	2	0	0	Price Cobb	Lola T332-Chevrolet
NC	Rick Villate	United States	2	0	0	RVR Inc.	Lola T294-Ford
NC	Roman Pechmann	Canada	2	0	0	Roman Pechmann Racing	Lola T290-Ford
NC	Bob Allen	United States	1	0	0	Bob Allen	SSE 003-Ford
NC	Bob Nagel	United States	1	0	0	Nagel Racing Enterprises	Lola T333CS-Chevrolet
NC	Brad Frisselle	United States	1	0	0	Brad Frisselle	Frissbee-Chevrolet
NC	Danny Johnson	United States	1	0	0	Danny Johnson	Chevron B24-Chevrolet
NC	Dave Hoover	United States	1	0	0	Dave Hoover	Lola T300-Chevrolet
NC	Garth Pollard	United States	1	0	0	N.S.F.Racing	Lola T294/6-Ford
NC	Gordon Hamilton	United States	1	0	0	Ticker Tape Racing	Chevron B36-Ford
NC	Hal Whipple	United States	1	0	0	Hal Whipple	Spartan MK3-B-Chevrolet
NC	James Woodruff	United States	1	0	0	Titan-Woodruff Brothers	Lola T430-Chevrolet
NC	Jerry Hansen	United States	1	0	0	Midwest Federal	Lola T333CS-Chevrolet
NC	Jim Gustafson	United States	1	0	0	Jim Gustafson Racing Team	Jackal 79-Chevrolet
NC	Jim Gutfreund	United States	1	0	0	Great Plains Motor Racing	Lola T292-Ford
NC	Joe Salyer	United States	1	0	0	Joe Salyer	Chevron B26/31-Ford
NC	Mike Roche	United States	1	0	0	Roche Racing	Lola T332-Chevrolet
NC	Patrick Gaillard	France	1	0	0	Patrick Gaillard	Schkee DB2-Chevrolet
NC	Rick Knoop	United States	1	0	0	Rick Knoop	Lola T332CS-Chevrolet
NC	Robert L. Douglas	United States	1	0	0	Robert L. Douglas	Lola T212-Ford
NC	Steven Payne-Herbert	United States	1	0	0	Steven Payne-Herbert	Lola T294-Ford
NC	Tom Spalding	United States	1	0	0	Tom Spalding	Schkee DB2-Chevrolet
NC	Bill Henry	United States	0	0	0	Bill Henry	Lola T296-Ford
NC	Don Kehr	United States	0	0	0	Don Kehr	Chevron B28-Chevrolet
NC	Hugh Kleinpeter	United States	0	0	0	Hugh Kleinpeter	Ralt CCK
NC	Jay Jacobs	United States	0	0	0	Genoa Racing	Chevron B21/23-Ford
NC	Patrick McGonegle	United States	0	0	0	Patrick McGonegle	Lola T332-Chevrolet
NC	Richard Guider	United States	0	0	0	Richard Guider	Chevron B25-Ford
NC	Robert E. Dugo	United States	0	0	0	Robert E. Dugo	Lola B.A.D. 1-Chevrolet
