= 1978 Can-Am season =

North American auto racing season

Seasons
- ← 1977 1979 →

The 1978 Can-Am season was the eleventh running of the Sports Car Club of America's prototype based series and the second running of the revived series. Alan Jones was declared champion, winning five of the ten rounds. Chevrolet again swept the season. Lola was not as dominant this season, as Elliot Forbes-Robinson won at Charlotte in a Spyder, SCCA legend George Follmer at Mont Tremblant in a Prophet, and Forbes-Robinson again at Trois-Rivieres.

== Results ==
Round	Circuit	Winning driver	Team	Car
1	Road Atlanta	(Australia) Alan Jones	(United States) Carl A. Haas Racing Team	Lola-Chevrolet
2	Charlotte	(United States) Elliot Forbes-Robinson	(United States) Newman-Freeman Racing	Spyder-Chevrolet
3	Mid-Ohio	(Australia) Alan Jones	(United States) Carl A. Haas Racing Team	Lola-Chevrolet
4	St. Jovite	(United States) George Follmer	(United States) U.S. Racing	Prophet-Chevrolet
5	Watkins Glen	(Australia) Warwick Brown	(United States) Racing Team VDS	Lola-Chevrolet
6	Road America	(Australia) Alan Jones	(United States) Carl A. Haas Racing Team	Lola-Chevrolet
7	Mosport	(Australia) Alan Jones	(United States) Carl A. Haas Racing Team	Lola-Chevrolet
8	Trois-Rivières	(United States) Elliot Forbes-Robinson	(United States) Newman-Freeman Racing	Spyder-Chevrolet
9	Laguna Seca	(United States) Al Holbert	(United States) Hogan Racing	Lola-Chevrolet
10	Riverside	(Australia) Alan Jones	(United States) Carl A. Haas Racing Team	Lola-Chevrolet
