= 1982 Can-Am season =

Seasons
- ← 1981 1983 →

The 1982 Can Am Series season was the fifteenth running of the Sports Car Club of America's prototype series, and the sixth running of the revived series. 1982 brought new competition for Chevrolet in the form of Hart and Cosworth. Hart would podium in three races while Cosworth would podium in two. The most dominant chassis were Frissbee, Marguey, March, VDS-001, and Ensign. Al Unser Jr. would win at Road Atlanta, Laguna Seca, and Mosport twice, with a podium at Mid Ohio, at Riverside, and at Caesar's Palacae. Unser would be declared champion.

Bertil Roos would take the two liter class in his Hart.

The scoring system was 90-60-40-30-20-10-9-8-7-6-5-4-3-2-1 points for the first fifteen classified drivers. All results counted.

== Results ==
Round	Circuit	Winning driver	Team	Car
1	Road Atlanta	(United States) Al Unser Jr.	(United States) Galles Racing	Frissbee-Chevrolet
2	Mosport	(United States) Al Unser Jr.	(United States) Galles Racing	Frissbee-Chevrolet
3	Mid-Ohio	(United States) Al Holbert	(United States) Racing Team VDS	VDS-Chevrolet
4	Road America	(United States) Al Holbert	(United States) Racing Team VDS	VDS-Chevrolet
5	Trois-Rivières	(United States) Al Holbert	(United States) Racing Team VDS	VDS-Chevrolet
6	Mosport	(United States) Al Unser Jr.	(United States) Galles Racing	Frissbee-Chevrolet
7	Caesars Palace	(United States) Danny Sullivan	(United States) Newman/Budweiser	March-Chevrolet
8	Riverside	(United States) Al Holbert	(United States) Racing Team VDS	VDS-Chevrolet
9	Laguna Seca	(United States) Al Unser Jr.	(United States) Galles Racing	Frissbee-Chevrolet
