= Can–Am =

Sports car racing series from 1966 to 1987

- The logo of the Can-Am Challenge Cup
- Category: Sports car racing
- Country: United States, Canada
- Inaugural season: 1966
- Folded: 1987

The Canadian-American Challenge Cup, or Can-Am, was an SCCA/CASC sports car racing series from 1966 to 1974, and again from 1977 to 1987.

The Can-Am rules were deliberately simple and placed few limits on the entries. This led to a wide variety of unique car body designs and powerful engine installations. Notable among these were Jim Hall's Chaparrals and entries with over 1,000 horsepower.

== History ==
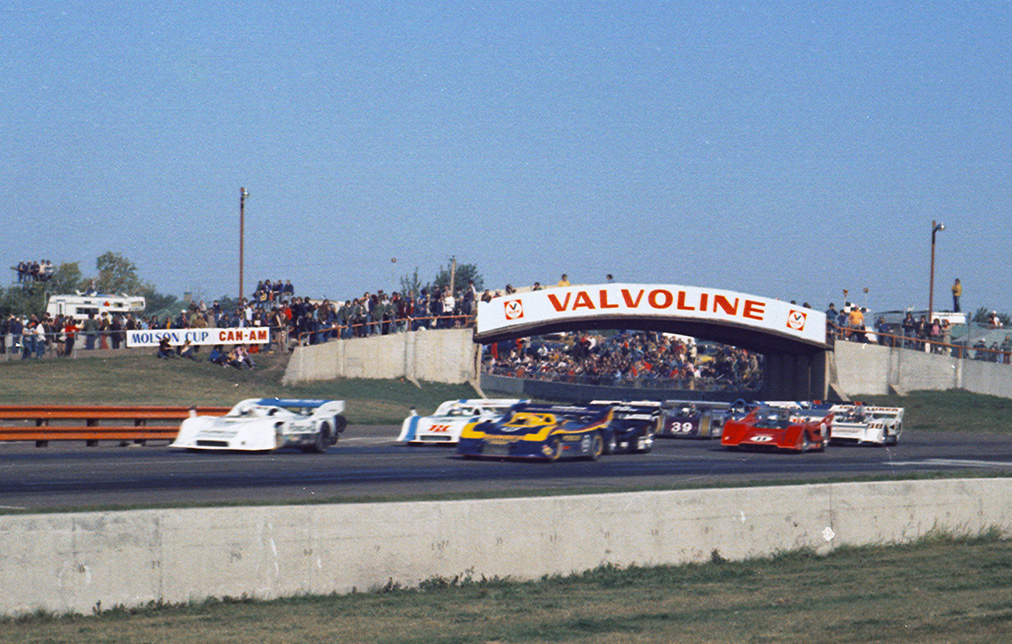
The Can-Am race at Edmonton International Speedway in 1973

Can-Am started out as a series for sport racers with two races in Canada (Can) and four races in the United States of America (Am). The series was initially sponsored by Johnson Wax. The series was governed under the FIA Group 7 category with unrestricted engine capacity and few other technical restrictions.

The Group 7 category was essentially a Formula Libre for sports cars; the regulations were minimal and permitted unlimited engine sizes (and allowed turbocharging and supercharging), virtually unrestricted aerodynamics, and were as close as any major international racing series ever got to have an "anything goes" policy. As long as the car had two seats, bodywork enclosing the wheels, and met basic safety standards, it was allowed. Group 7 had arisen as a category for non-homologated sports car "specials" in Europe and, for a while in the 1960s, Group 7 racing was popular in the United Kingdom as well as a class in hillclimb racing in Europe. Group 7 cars were designed more for short-distance sprints than for endurance racing. Some Group 7 cars were also built in Japan by Nissan and Toyota, but these did not compete outside their homeland (though some of the Can-Am competitors occasionally went over to race against them).

SCCA sports car racing was becoming more popular with European constructors and drivers, and the United States Road Racing Championship for large-capacity sports racers eventually gave rise to the Group 7 Can-Am series. There was a prize and appearance money and plenty of trade backing; the series was profitable for its competitors but resulted, by its end, in cars with well over 1,000 horsepower (750 kW) (the Porsche team claimed 1,500 hp (1,100 kW) for its 917/30 in qualifying trim), wings, active downforce generation, very light weight and unheard of speeds. Similar Group 7 cars ran in the European Interserie series from 1970 on, but this was toned down compared to the Can-Am.

On-track, the series was initially dominated by Lola, followed by a period in which it became known as the "Bruce and Denny show", the McLaren works team dominated for five consecutive seasons (1967–1971) until the Porsche 917 was perfected and became almost unbeatable in 1972 and 1973. After Porsche's withdrawal, Shadow dominated the last season before Can-Am faded away to be replaced by Formula 5000. Racing was rarely close—one marque was usually dominant—but the noise and spectacle of the cars made the series highly popular.

The 1973 oil crisis and the increased cost of competing in Can-Am meant that the series folded after the relatively lackluster 1974 season; the single-seater SCCA Continental Championship Formula 5000 series became the leading road-racing series in North America and many of the Can-Am drivers and teams continued to race there. F5000's reign lasted for only two years, with a second generation of Can-Am following. This was a fundamentally different series based initially on converted F5000 cars with closed-wheel bodies. There was also a two-liter class based on Formula Two chassis. The second iteration of Can-Am faded away as IMSA and CART racing became more popular in the early 1980s, but the series remained active until 1987.

Can-Am remains a remembered form of racing due to its popularity in the 1960s and early 1970s, the limited number of regulations allowing fast and innovative cars and the lineup of talented drivers. Can-Am cars remain popular in historic racing today.

== Notable drivers ==
Notable drivers in the original Can-Am series included virtually every acclaimed driver of the late 1960s and early 1970s. Jim Hall, Mark Donohue, Mario Andretti, Parnelli Jones, George Follmer, Dan Gurney, Phil Hill, Denny Hulme, Jacky Ickx, Bruce McLaren, Jackie Oliver, Peter Revson, John Surtees, and Charlie Kemp all drove Can-Am cars competitively and were successful, winning races and championship titles. Al Holbert, Alan Jones and Al Unser Jr. are among the drivers who launched their careers in the revived Can-Am series.

== Pioneering technology ==
Can-Am was the birthplace and proving ground for what, at the time, was cutting-edge technology. Can-Am cars were among the first race cars to use sport wings, effective turbocharging, ground-effect aerodynamics, and aerospace materials like titanium. This led to the eventual downfall of the original series when costs got prohibitive. However during its height, Can-Am cars were at the forefront of racing technology and were frequently as fast as or even faster around laps of certain circuits than the contemporary Formula One cars. Noted constructors in the Can-Am series include McLaren, Chaparral, Lola, BRM, Shadow and Porsche.

== Manufacturers ==
=== McLaren ===
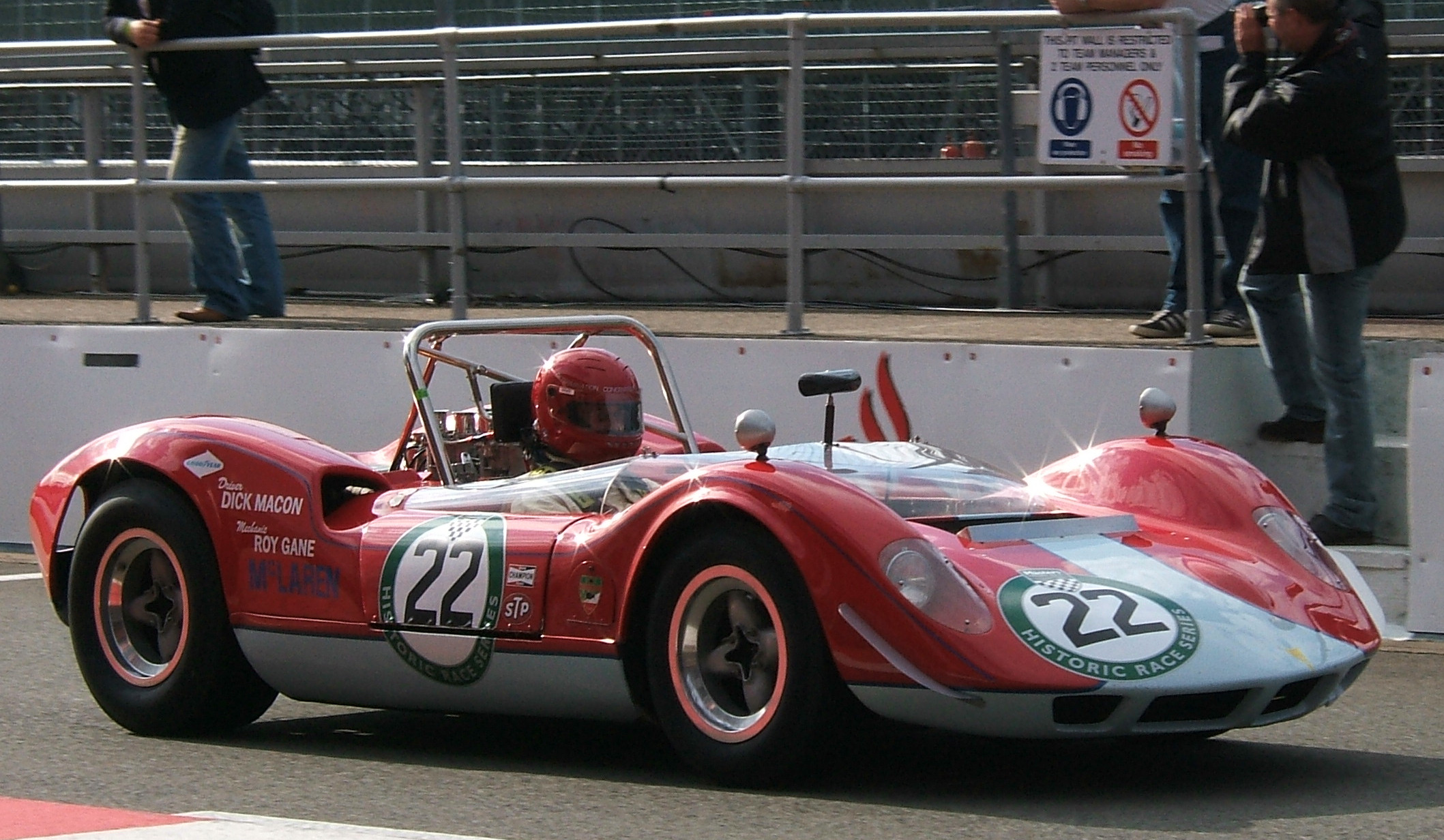
A McLaren M1A, one of the early Can-Am competitors that was equally at home in other sportscar series.

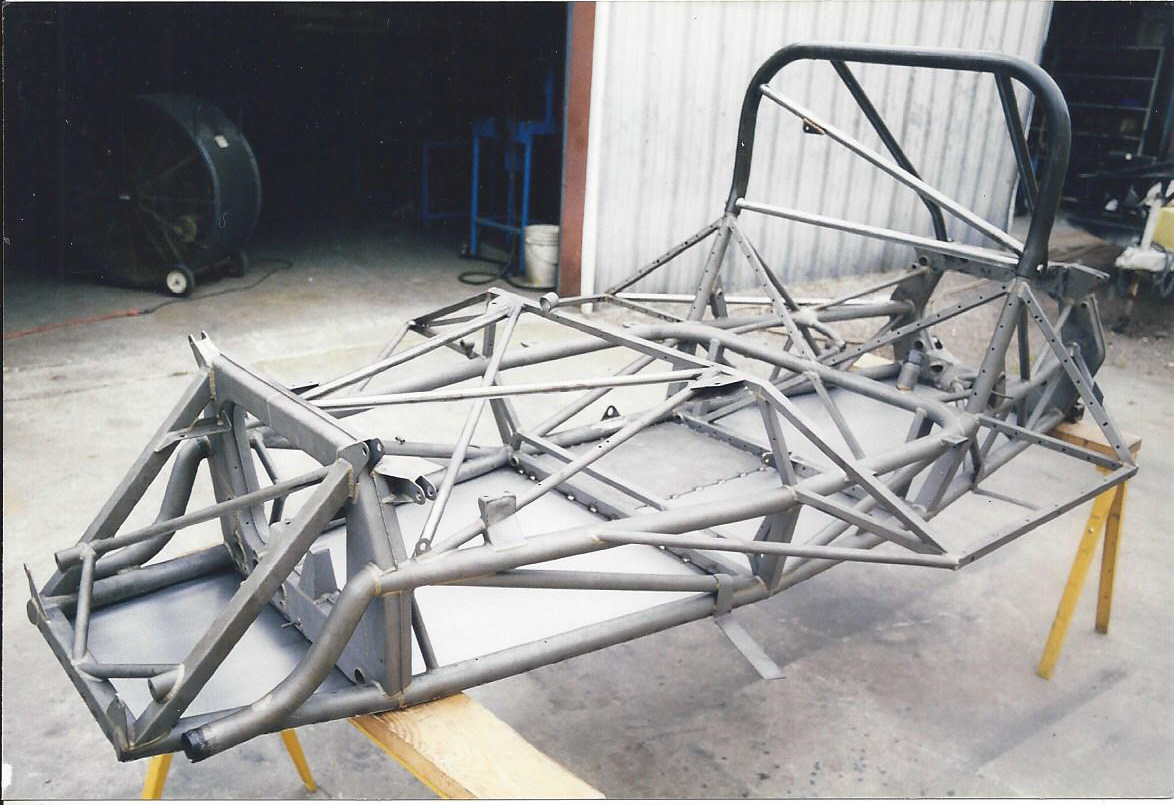
McLaren Can Am Chassis restored by Racefab Inc. for vintage racing

McLaren cars were specially designed race cars. The Can-Am cars were developments of the sports cars which were introduced in 1964 for the North American sports car races. The team works car for 1964 was the M1. For 1965 the M1A prototype was the team car and bases for the Elva customer M1A cars. In late 1965 the M1b(mk2) was the factory car in 1966 with Bruce McLaren and Chris Amon as drivers. In 1967, specifically for the Can-Am series, the McLaren team introduced a new model, the M6A. The McLaren M6A also introduced what was to become the trademark orange color for the team. The McLaren team was considered very "multinational" for the times and consisted of team owner and leader Bruce McLaren, fellow New Zealander Chris Amon and another "kiwi", the 1967 Formula One world champion, Denny Hulme, team manager Teddy Mayer, mechanics Tyler Alexander, Gary Knutson, Lee Muir, George Bolthoff, Frank Zimmerman, Tom Anderson, Alan Anderson, David Dunlap, Leo Beattie, Donny Ray Everett, and Haig Alltounian (all from the US), Don Beresford, Alec Greaves, Vince Higgins, and Roger Bailey (UK), Tony Attard (Australia), Cary Taylor, Jimmy Stone, Chris Charles, Colin Beanland, Alan McCall, and Alistair Caldwell (NZ). The M6 series used a full aluminum monocoque design with no uncommon features but, for the times, there was an uncommon attention to detail in preparation by the team members. The M6 series of cars were powered by Chevy "mouse-motor" small-block V8s built by Al Bartz Engines in Van Nuys, California. They were models of reliability. This was followed in 1968 by the M8A, a new design based around the Chevy big-block V8 "rat motor" as a stressed member of the chassis. McLaren went "in house" with their engine shop in 1969. The M8B, M8C, M8D and M20C were developments of that aluminum monocoque chassis. McLaren so dominated the 1967-1971 seasons that Can-Am was often called the "Bruce and Denny show" after the drivers who very often finished first and second. There was even a one-two-three finish at the Michigan International Speedway on September 28, 1969: McLaren first, Hulme second, and Gurney third. Nine months later, Bruce McLaren lost his life, on June 2, 1970, at Goodwood when the rear bodywork of his prototype M8D detached during testing resulting in a completely uncontrollable car and a fatal high-speed crash. Team McLaren continued to succeed in Can-Am after Bruce's death with a number of other drivers, but the works Porsche effort with a turbocharged flat-12 engines and a high development budget meant that they could not keep up with the 917. Although private McLarens continued in the series, the works team withdrew to concentrate on Formula One (and USAC, for several years). Team McLaren went on to become a several time F1 champion and is still a part of that series.

=== Porsche ===
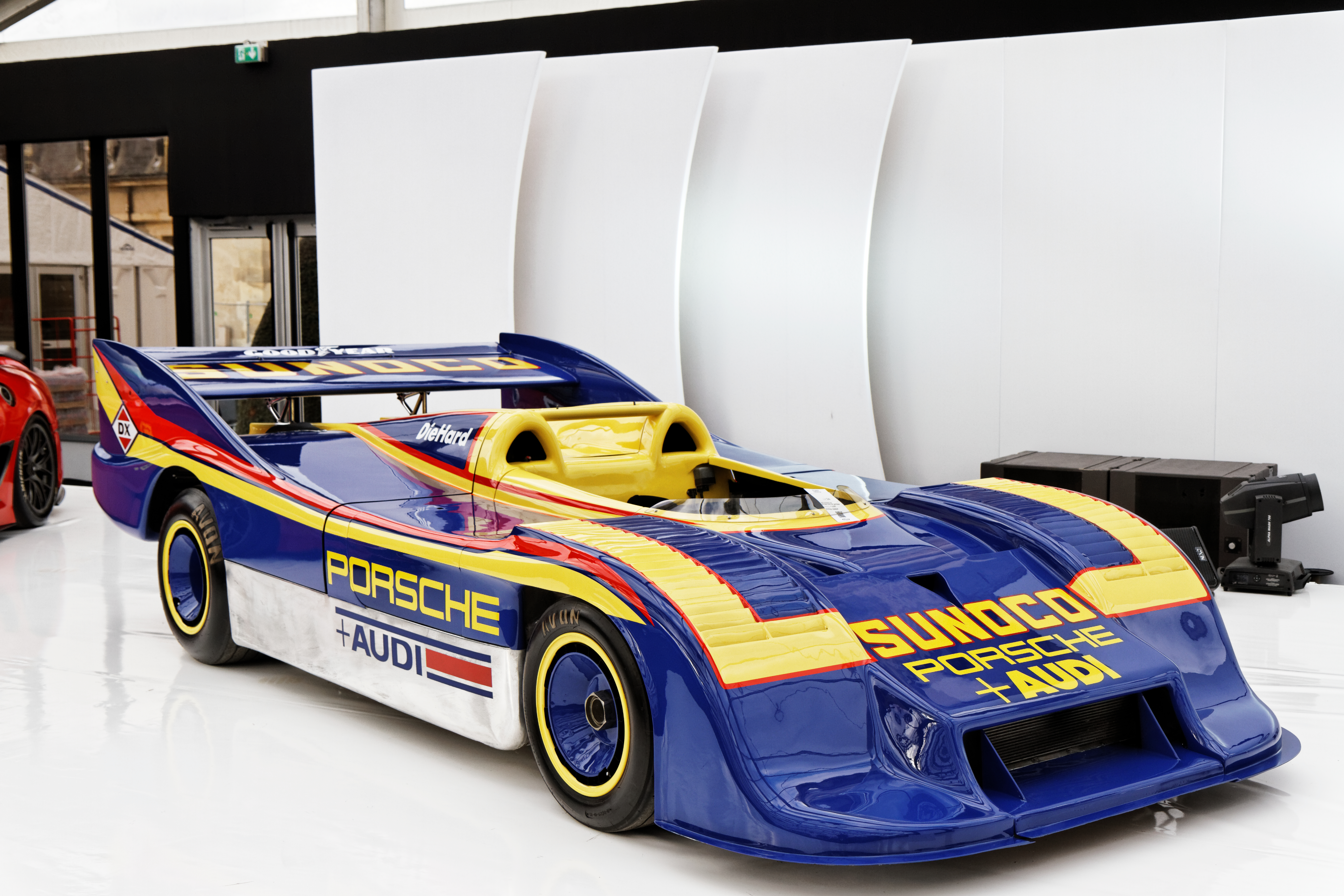
The Porsche 917/30 carried Mark Donohue to the 1973 championship.

The Porsche 908 spyder was used in Can-Am, but was underpowered (350 hp) and mainly used by underfunded teams. It did win the 1970 Road Atlanta race, when the more powerful cars fell out. The 917PA, a spyder version of the 917K Le Mans car, was raced, but its normally aspirated flat-12 was underpowered (530 hp). In 1971 the 917/10 was introduced. This was not turbocharged, but was lighter and had cleaner body work, and Jo Siffert managed to finish fourth in the championship.

For 1972 the 917/10K with a turbocharged 900 horsepower five-litre flat-12 was introduced. Prepared by Roger Penske and driven by Mark Donohue and George Follmer these cars won six of the nine races. In 1972 Porsche introduced an even more powerful car, the 917/30KL. Nicknamed the "Turbopanzer" this car was seen as a monster. With 1,100 or 1,580 horsepower (820/1161 kW) in race or qualifying trim available from its 5.4 litre flat-12 and weighing 1,800 lb (816 kg) with better downforce this car won six of eight races in the 1973 championship. Porsche's dominance was such that engine rules were changed to try to reduce the lack of competition for one marque by enforcing a fuel-consumption rule for 1974. This kind of alteration of rules to promote equality is not unknown in other forms of American motorsport. The category that the car had been created for and competed in was discontinued and in 1975 Donohue drove this car to a closed-course world-speed record of 221 mph (average)(356 km/h) at the Talladega Superspeedway (then called the "Alabama International Motor Speedway"). It was capable of 240 mph (386 km/h) on the straights.

=== Chaparral ===
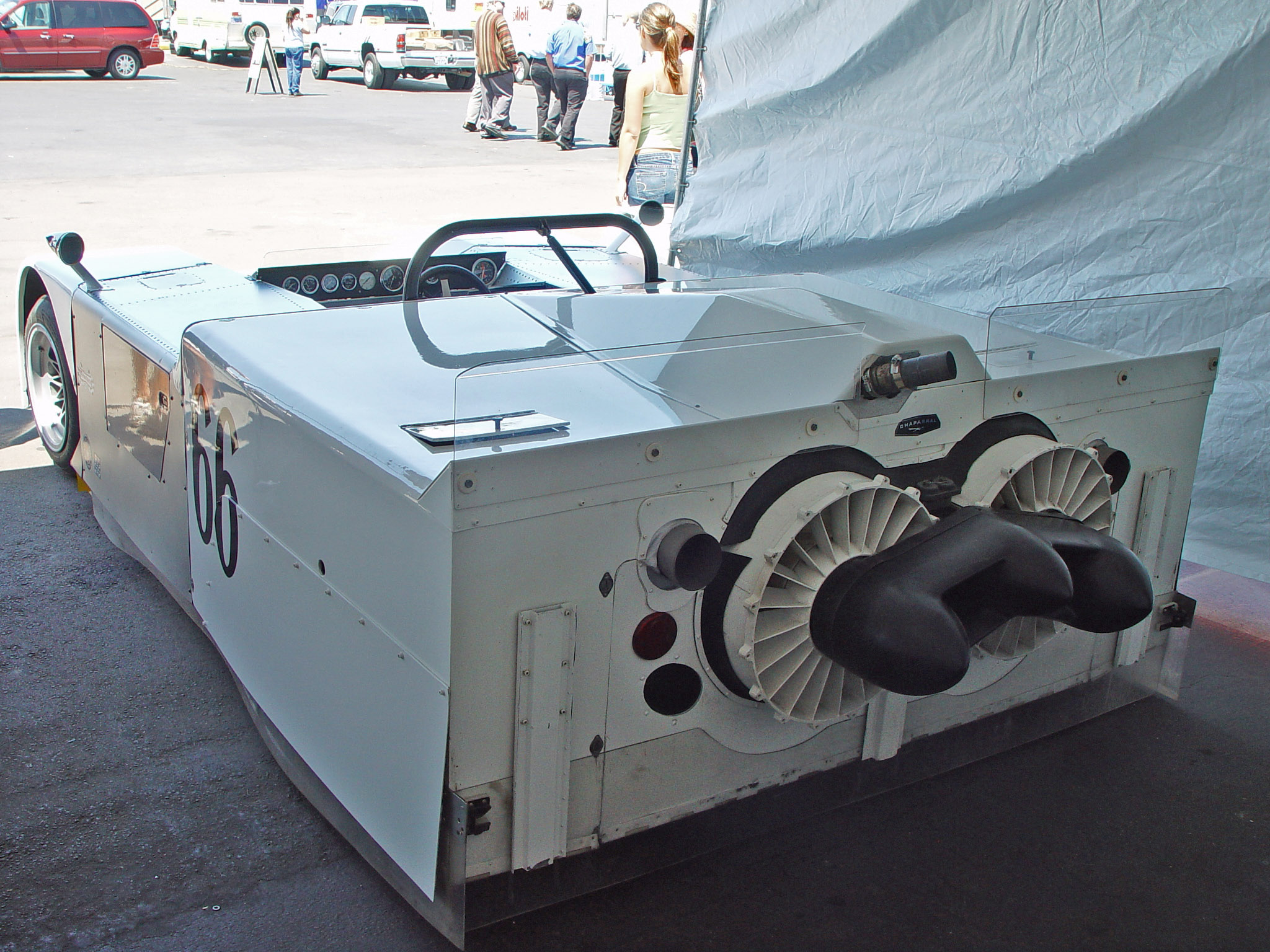
Chaparral's infamous 2J "Sucker Car" was banned from Can-Am after 1970, due to its unique downforce-producing fans.

Jim Hall's Chaparrals were very innovative, following his success in the United States Road Racing Championship (USRRC). The 2 series Chaparrals (built and engineered with a high degree of covert support from Chevrolet's research and development division) were leaders in the application of aerodynamics to race cars culminating with the introduction of the 2E in 1966, the first of the high wing race cars. The 2E was a defining design, and the 2G was a development of that basic design. The FIA banned movable aerodynamic devices and Chaparral responded with the 2H 1969. The 2H broke new ground, seeking to reduce drag but did not achieve much success. The 2J that followed was perhaps the ultimate example of what Group 7 rules could allow in a racing car. It was a twin-engined car, with the by-then usual big-block Chevrolet engine providing the driving force, and a tiny snowmobile engine powering a pair of fans at the back of the car. These fans, combined with the movable Lexan "skirts" around the bottom of the car created a vacuum underneath the car, effectively providing the same level of downforce as the huge wings of previous vehicles, without the drag. Although far too mechanically complex to survive in racing environments, the theory was sound, and would appear in Formula One a few years later in the BT46B "Fan Car" of 1978.

=== Lola ===
The Lola T70, T160-165, T220, T260, and T310 were campaigned by the factory and various customers, and were primarily Chevy powered. The Lola T70 driven by John Surtees won the first Can-Am championship in 1966. Lola continued to experiment with new designs versus McLaren which refined the design each year. The 1971 Lola T260 had some success with Jackie Stewart taking two victories. In 1972 a radical new design, the Lola T310, made its appearance. The T310 was the longest and widest Can-Am car of the era versus the short stubby T260. The T310 was delivered late and suffered handling problems the entire year with its best finish a fourth at Watkins Glen.

=== Others ===
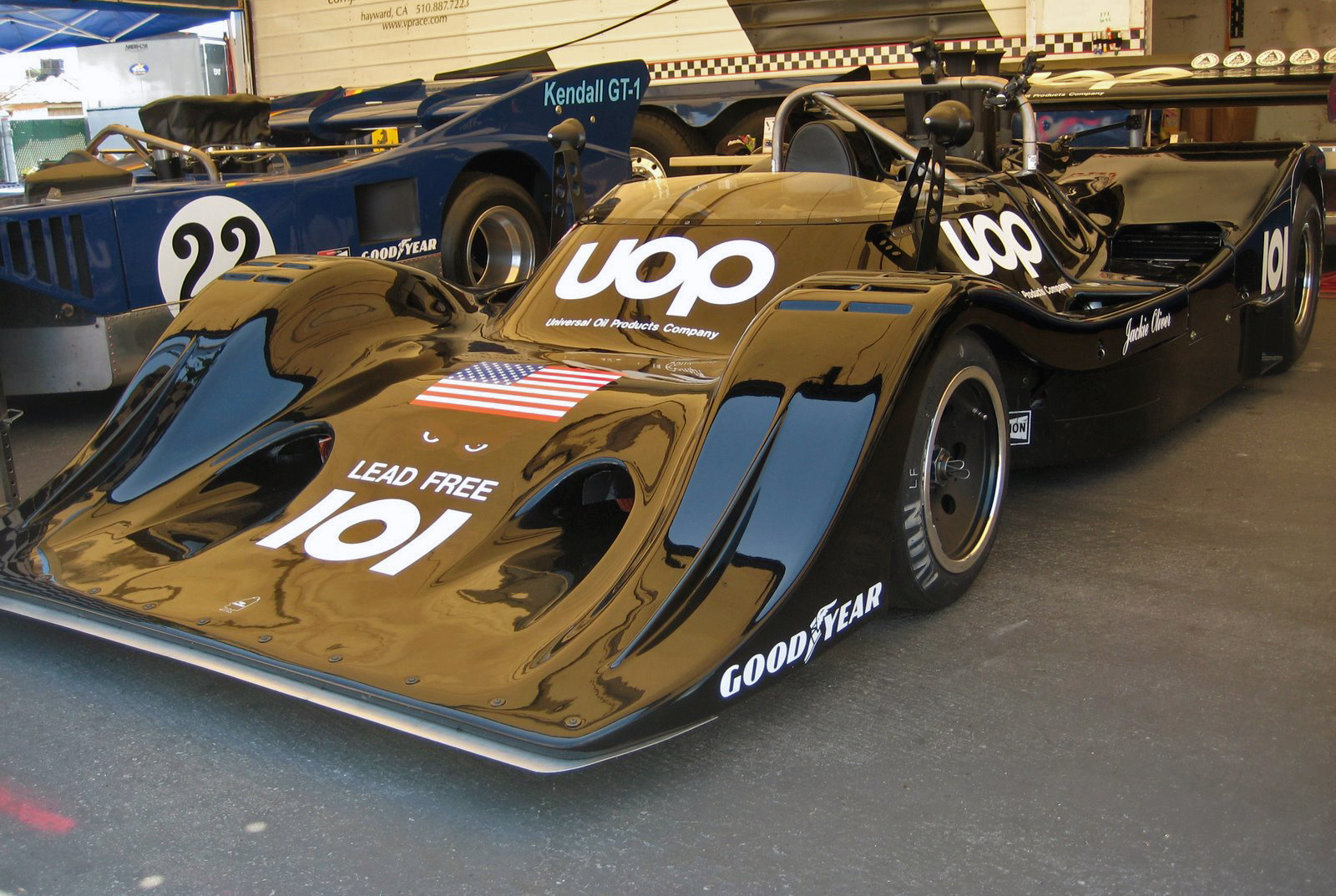
1974s Shadow DN4A

While McLaren and Porsche dominated the series for most of its existence, other vehicles also appeared. Well-established European manufacturers like Lotus, CRD, in the form of their Merlyn Mk8 Chevrolet, Ferrari and BRM, appeared at various times with limited success, while March tried to get a share of the lucrative market in 1970–71, but could not establish themselves. Ford also flitted across the scene with a number of unsuccessful cars based on the GT40 and its successors. American specialist marques like McKee, Genie and Caldwell competed, alongside exotica like the astonishing four-engined Macs-It special.

British-born mechanic and engineer Peter Bryant designed the Ti22 (occasionally known as the Autocoast after one of the team's major backers) as an American-built challenger to the British McLarens and Lolas. The car made extensive use of titanium in its chassis and suspension, and Bryant experimented with aerodynamics and with early use of carbon-fibre to reduce weight. Although the car was quick it did not achieve consistent success; problems with the team's funding saw Bryant move on to Don Nichols' UOP-sponsored Shadow team. The Shadow marque had made its debut with an astonishing car with tiny wheels and radiators mounted on top of the rear wing designed by Trevor Harris; this was unsuccessful, and more conventional cars designed by Bryant replaced them; Bryant was sidelined when Shadow moved into Formula One but after his departure, turbocharged Shadows came to dominate as Porsche and McLaren faded from the scene.

== Decline and revivals ==
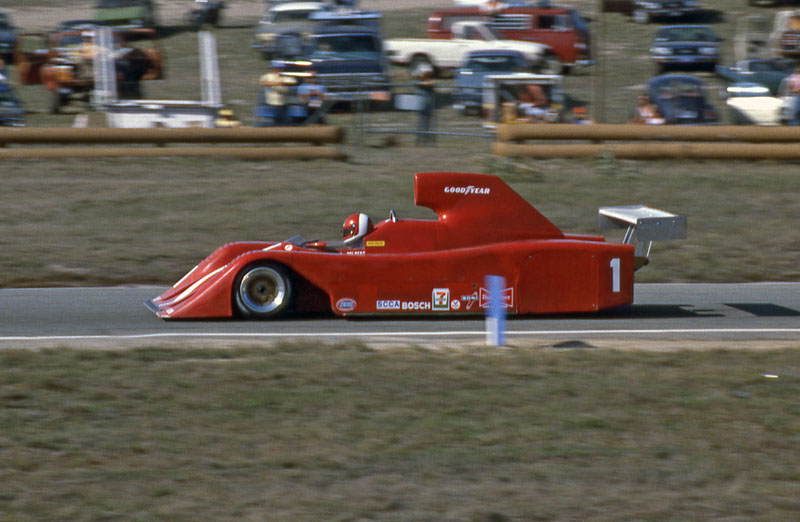
Al Holbert driving a VDS-001 in the revived Can-Am in 1982.

The last year for the original Can-Am championship was 1974. Spiraling costs, a recession in North America following the oil crisis, and dwindling support and interest led to the series being canceled and the last scheduled race of the 1974 season not being run.

The Can-Am name still held enough drawing power to lead SCCA to introduce a revised Can-Am series in 1977 based on a closed-wheel version of the rules of the recently canceled Formula A/5000 series. This grew steadily in status, particularly during the USAC/CART wars of the late 70s and early 80s, and attracted some top road-racing teams and drivers and a range of vehicles including specials based on rebodied single seaters (particularly Lola F5000s) and also bespoke cars from constructors like March as well as smaller manufacturers. To broaden the appeal of the series a 2L class was introduced for the last several years—cars often being derived from F2/Formula Atlantic. The series peaked in the early 80s but as the CART Indycar series and IMSA's GTP championship grew in stature it faded. In 1987 the series changed as Indycars started to become a source of cars. The SCCA took away the Can-Am name but the series continued as the Can-Am Teams Thunder Cars Championship. After a single year the teams took the sports bodies off and evolved into American Indycar Series.

In 1991, after 18 months of development, a Shelby Can-Am series was created using a production line of Sports bodied cars designed by Carroll Shelby powered by a 3.3 litre Dodge V6. The series ran for five years before it was dropped by the SCCA. A large number of cars were relocated to South Africa and ran from 2000 onwards.

The name was once again revived in 1998, when the United States Road Racing Championship broke away from IMSA. Their top prototype class was named Can-Am, but the series would fold before the end of 1999 before being replaced by the Grand American Road Racing Championship. The Can-Am name would not be retained in the new series.

== Champions ==
Year	Driver	Team	Car
1966	(United Kingdom) John Surtees	(United Kingdom) Team Surtees	Lola T70-Chevrolet
1967	(New Zealand) Bruce McLaren	(United Kingdom) Bruce McLaren Motor Racing	McLaren M6A-Chevrolet
1968	(New Zealand) Denny Hulme	(United Kingdom) Bruce McLaren Motor Racing	McLaren M8A-Chevrolet
1969	(New Zealand) Bruce McLaren	(United Kingdom) Bruce McLaren Motor Racing	McLaren M8B-Chevrolet
1970	(New Zealand) Denny Hulme	(United Kingdom) Bruce McLaren Motor Racing	McLaren M8D-Chevrolet
1971	(United States) Peter Revson	(United Kingdom) Bruce McLaren Motor Racing	McLaren M8F-Chevrolet
1972	(United States) George Follmer	(United States) Penske Racing	Porsche 917/10
1973	(United States) Mark Donohue	(United States) Penske Racing	Porsche 917/30 TC
1974	(United Kingdom) Jackie Oliver	(United Kingdom) Shadow Racing Cars	Shadow DN4A-Chevrolet
1975–1976	No series		
1977	(France) Patrick Tambay	(United States) Haas-Hall Racing	Lola T333CS-Chevrolet
1978	(Australia) Alan Jones	(United States) Haas-Hall Racing	Lola T333CS-Chevrolet
1979	(Belgium) Jacky Ickx	(United States) Carl Haas Racing	Lola T333CS-Chevrolet
1980	(France) Patrick Tambay	(United States) Carl Haas Racing	Lola T530-Chevrolet
1981	(Australia) Geoff Brabham	(Belgium) Team VDS	Lola T530-Chevrolet / VDS 001-Chevrolet
1982	(United States) Al Unser Jr.	(United States) Galles Racing	Frissbee GR3-Chevrolet
1983	(Canada) Jacques Villeneuve Sr.	(Canada) Canadian Tire	Frissbee GR3-Chevrolet
1984	(Republic of Ireland) Michael Roe	(United States) Norwood/Walker	VDS 002-Chevrolet / VDS 004-Chevrolet
1985	(United States) Rick Miaskiewicz	(United States) Mosquito Autosport	Frissbee GR3-Chevrolet
1986	(Canada) Horst Kroll	(Canada) Kroll Racing	Frissbee KR3-Chevrolet
1987	(United States) Bill Tempero	(United States) Texas American Racing Team	March 85C-Chevrolet

=== Under 2 Litre class champions ===
Year	Driver	Team	Car
1979	(United States) Tim Evans	(United States) Diversified Engineering Services	Lola T290-Ford
1980	(United States) Gary Gove	(United States) Pete Lovely VW	Ralt RT2-Hart
1981	(United States) Jim Trueman	(United States) TrueSports	Ralt RT2-Hart
1982	(Sweden) Bertil Roos	(United States) Elite Racing	Marquey CA82-Hart
1983	(Sweden) Bertil Roos	(United States) Roos Racing School	Scandia B3-Hart
1984	(United States) Kim Campbell	(United States) Tom Mitchell Racing	March 832-BMW
1985	(United States) Lou Sell	(United States) Sell Racing	March 832-BMW

== Bibliography ==
- Can-Am, Pete Lyons, Motorbooks International
- Can-Am Races 1966–1969, Brooklands Books
- Can-Am Races 1970–1974, Brooklands Books
- Can-Am Racing Cars 1966–1974, Brooklands Books
- Can-Am Challenger, Peter Bryant, David Bull
