= Carl Haas =

American motorsport team owner and driver

- Born: February 26, 1929; Ludwigshafen am Rhein, Germany
- Died: June 29, 2016 (aged 87); Lake Forest, Illinois, U.S.
- Spouse: Bernadette Haas

Carl Arthur Haas (February 26, 1929 – June 29, 2016) was an American auto racing impresario. He co-owned the Newman/Haas/Lanigan Racing team in the Champ Car and IndyCar Series with Paul Newman and Mike Lanigan. He also owned Carl A. Haas Motorsports, which competed in the NASCAR Nationwide Series, as well as the Haas Lola Formula One team.

== Early life ==
Haas was born in Ludwigshafen am Rhein in Germany. He emigrated to the US in March 1938. He was of Dutch Jews descent. His father fled Germany in the 1930s.

== Career ==
Haas grew up in Chicago and sold gearbox parts from his parents' home. He used the proceeds to begin racing sports cars in 1952 and won numerous races driving Ferraris, Porsches, MGs, and Jaguars. After winning the 1957 12 Hours of Sebring he retired from driving in the early 1960s in order to focus more on team ownership and other racing-related businesses. In 1967, he became the exclusive American importer for Lola Cars and helped the company attain national prominence in the racing world. His own company, Carl A. Haas Auto Imports, was founded in Lincolnshire, Illinois in 1960, and is involved in racing distribution deals, notably for Hewland gearboxes.

During the 1970s, Haas entered race teams in various series, including Formula 5000, the Can-Am Series and the Super Vee series. His Can-Am drivers included Masten Gregory, Peter Revson, Jackie Stewart, Brian Redman, Alan Jones, Patrick Tambay, Jacky Ickx, and David Hobbs. His Super Vee driver, Eddie Miller, won the series title. In 1985, he ran the Haas Lola Formula One team, using a chassis built by FORCE. He also co-owned a NASCAR Winston Cup Series team with Travis Carter and a separate team with Michael Kranefuss.

In 1983, Haas joined with actor Paul Newman to form Newman/Haas Racing, a team in the Championship Auto Racing Teams (CART) Series. The team won its first CART title with Mario Andretti the next year, and the team went on to win three more series championships: Michael Andretti won in 1991, former Formula 1 World champion Nigel Mansell in 1993, and Brazilian Cristiano da Matta in 2002. Following the CART–IndyCar split and the subsequent bankruptcy of CART, Newman/Haas has won in the successor series to CART, the Champ Car World Series, with Sébastien Bourdais in 2004, 2005, 2006 and 2007.

During his years in CART, Haas became known for his fondness for cigars. Prohibited from smoking in the pitlane, he would chew an unlit cigar during the race, often at both ends. When Michael Andretti and Juan Pablo Montoya collided during a practice session for the 1999 race at Twin Ring Motegi, Japan, Haas threw his cigar at Montoya's car owner Chip Ganassi during a confrontation in the garage area.

One of the few car owners ever to record victories in F5000, CART, Champcar and IRL, Haas also participated in race promotion. He served on CART's Board of Governors until it folded in 2003, and retired as chairman of the SCCA Pro Racing Division in 2001. He also chaired the Board of the SCCA for a record four terms until his retirement in 1996. Haas was also a member of the board of directors at Road America. Haas also promoted races at the Milwaukee Mile, inducing CART races and NASCAR Busch Series, NASCAR Craftsman Truck Series, and American Speed Association races. He also promoted the Grand Prix of Houston.

Overall, Haas's teams have won 11 championships in three decades. IMS called him one of the "most powerful men in the history of auto racing." He was inducted into the SCCA Hall of Fame in 2007. Haas was inducted into the Motorsports Hall of Fame of America in 2025.

== Personal life ==
Haas lived in Lake Forest, Illinois with his wife, Bernadette.

It was announced on July 7, 2016, that Haas had died on June 29, 2016, at his home.
