= American Indycar Series =

American open wheel racing series founded in 1988

- Sport: Auto racing
- Jurisdiction: United States
- Abbreviation: AIS
- Founded: 1988
- President: Bill Tempero
- Closure date: 2005

The American Indycar Series (AIS) was an American open wheel racing series founded in 1988 by racing driver, owner, and businessperson Bill Tempero. The series utilized year-old (and older) chassis and engines from the CART series and later the Indy Racing League. CART and IRL drivers including Buddy Lazier, Jaques Lazier, Robby Unser, and Johnny Unser found early career success in the AIS.

In the mid-1980s, the once-popular Can-Am series was withering, and most teams had already defected to CART or IMSA. The last holdouts formed "CAT" (Can-Am Teams) in 1986 to take over sanctioning of the series as part of the SCCA. Two plans emerged, one keeping the Formula 5000-based cars, and others, led by Bill Tempero who favored using old CART Indy car machines. During 1986 and 1987, the CAT races were run essentially as two-class races, with the familiar full-bodied Formula 5000 cars racing alongside ex-CART Indy cars. CAT folded after the 1987 season.

Tempero then broke off and started his Indy car-based series in 1988. With an emphasis on cost savings, ex-CART Indy car chassis were powered by 5.9 L (360 in^{3}) normally aspirated, stock block Chevrolet V-8 engines. Buddy Lazier was the first season champion. Tempero himself won one race that year, and placed third in the final season points standings.

As the series slowly began to gain competitors, the teams were allowed to run a choice of multiple powerplants. The aforementioned stock block Chevy, or the Buick V-6 in turbocharged or normally aspirated configuration. Some entries even showed up with the turbocharged Cosworth DFX, once a mainstay of the CART Indy car circuit. An equivalency formula was created to provide for competitive balance among the different engine combinations. The chassis utilized were the March, Lola, Reynard, Eagle, and Penske from CART competition. In later years, G-Force and Dallara chassis from IRL competition saw use as well. Over the years, the AIS series had a predominantly western-based schedule, but early on did have races in New York and in the South. International races were held in both Canada and Mexico. AIS raced on mostly short ovals and road courses, occasionally splitting a bill with Weekly racing series, Late models, and other short track series. A few street circuits and "roval" races were also held.

The original Tempero-era American Indycar Series ceased at the end of the 2000 season. The AIS was sold to a group led by Barry Brooke and Bobby Brooks. However, the series subsequently folded permanently after only two race meets had been held in 2002. A new management team formed the United States Speedway Series (USSS), which started racing in 2001. The USSS ran for five years under mostly the same format, featuring older chassis from CART and the first generation of IRL (G-Force and Dallara); with a variety of normally aspirated and turbocharged engines. The final season of the USSS was in 2005.

== 1988 American Indycar Series season ==
The 1988 Valvoline-Machinists Union American Indycar Series was the inaugural season of the American Indycar Series. After running mixed-class races with ex-Indy car chassis alongside the full-bodied Formula 5000-based machines in the Can-Am series in 1986–1987, this represented the first full season for Bill Tempero's Indy car series. The cars were powered by stock block Chevrolet engines, ranging from 275 to 400 cubic inch displacement. The chassis were mostly used Marches and Lolas from CART competition in 1985–1986.

The season consisted of eight races beginning at Willow Springs in California. Three of the events were to be hosted as twin-race weekends, with the season finale consisting of twin races at Willow Springs. Three of the races were held on 1/2 mile ovals, and rest were held on road courses. Buddy Lazier won the first season championship, with six wins out of the eight contested races. Kevin Whitesides placed second in points, posting three runner-up finishes, and was declared the rookie of the year.

Rd.	Date	Type	Track	Location	Winner	Chassis	Engine	Tire	Laps	Miles	Ref.
1	May 1	R	Willow Springs	Rosamond, California	Buddy Lazier	March 85C	Chevrolet	H	40	101.6	
2	June 19	R	Gateway International Raceway	Madison, Illinois	Buddy Lazier	March 85C	Chevrolet	H	54	118.8	
3	July 3	R	Mountain View Motorsports Park	Mead, Colorado	Robby Unser	Lola	Chevrolet	H	100	100	
4	July 23	O	Shangri-La Motor Speedway	Owego, New York	Buddy Lazier	March 85C	Chevrolet	H	100	50	
4	July 23	O	Shangri-La Motor Speedway	Owego, New York	Cancelled due to rain				100	50	
5	September 3	O	Race City Speedway	Calgary, Alberta, Canada	Buddy Lazier	March 86C	Chevrolet	H	125	62.5	
6	September 4	O	Race City Speedway	Calgary, Alberta, Canada	Bill Tempero	Lola	Chevrolet	H	125	62.5	
7	October 9	R	Willow Springs	Rosamond, California	Buddy Lazier	March 85C	Chevrolet	H	24	60.96	
8	October 9	R	Willow Springs	Rosamond, California	Buddy Lazier	March 85C	Chevrolet	H	24	60.96	

O Oval
R Road course

=== Race summaries ===
- Round 1: The first race of the season was held at Willow Springs. Buddy Lazier started on the pole position after winning a 5-lap qualifying heat over Bob Schader. Lazier won the 40-lap race in dominating fashion, finishing 29.16 seconds ahead of second place Kevin Whitesides. The race was run in two 20-lap heats, with a one-hour halfway intermission for teams to make adjustments to their cars.
- Round 2: The Illinois Grand Prix was held at the old road course at Gateway International Raceway. Buddy Lazier won the pole position with a lap of 98.4 mph. The race was run in two 27-lap legs, with a two-hour halfway break for teams to make adjustments to their machines. On a hot afternoon, a crowd of 6,000 were in attendance. Buddy Lazier led the most laps and won the race, despite experiencing bad tire wear over the final 15 laps. Bill Tempero, who battled with Lazier in the early going, finished second, 41.08 seconds behind. Kevin Whitesides blew an engine on Friday, then suffered a fire during the warmup lap, but he recovered to finish 4th.
- Round 3: The Grand Prix of Colorado was held at the Mountain View Motor Sports Park road course on July 4th weekend. Robby Unser won the pole position and led-wire to wire for his first victory in the series. Buddy Lazier finish second, 4.5 seconds behind.
- Round 4: The first oval event for the AIS was held at Shangri-La Speedway in New York. Twin 100-lap races were scheduled, but the second feature race was rained out. Only eight cars showed up, in front of a paltry crowd of roughly 2,500 spectators. Bill Tempero won the pole position, but elected to start the race at the back of the field. Buddy Lazier suffered an oil leak after practice in his March 86C, so the car was parked. His switched cars with his father and teammate Bob, who was driving an ex-Bobby Rahal March 85C. Lazier led all 100 laps en route to his third victory of the season. Only four cars were running at the finish.
- Round 5: The AIS held its first race outside of the United States, with twin 125-lap races at Race City in Calgary. A pit stop demonstration was held Friday at Stephen Avenue mall to promote the event. The first race was held Saturday night. During practice on Friday, Buddy Lazier suffered a shattered brake disc on his March 85C, so he once again switched cars with his father Bob and drove the team's 86C. At that point, Bob elected to retire from driving in AIS. Lazier beat Kevin Whitesides to the finish line by 0.3 seconds. Bill Tempero finished third.
- Round 6: The second race of the twin races at Race City in Calgary was held Sunday afternoon. Robby Unser set a new track record of 15.273 seconds to win the pole position. Bill Tempero won the race, with Unser second. Kevin Whitesides finished third, and Buddy Lazier fourth.
- Rounds 7 and 8: The Bud Light 100 was the final event of the season. It was held as twin races at Willow Springs. Buddy Lazier won the pole position with a lap of 120.656 mph, and Robby Unser qualified second. During the first race, Robby Unser grabbed the lead at the start, and led the first 11 laps. Buddy Lazier took the lead in turn one lap 12, and led to the checkered flag. Lazier beat Unser to the finish line by 3.04 seconds, and with the victory, mathematically clinched the 1988 AIS championship. In the second race, Lazier started from the pole, and once again drove to victory, his sixth win of the season. Kevin Whitesides ran out of fuel during both races, but still scored enough points to place second in the final points standings.

=== Final points standings (Top five) ===
Pos	Driver	R1 (United States)	R2 (United States)	R3 (United States)	R4 (United States)	R5 (Canada)	R6 (Canada)	R7 (United States)	R8 (United States)	Pts
1	(United States) Buddy Lazier	1	1	2	1	1	4	1	1	152
2	(United States) Kevin Whitesides RY	2	4	3	2	2	3	6	4	112
3	(United States) Bill Tempero	9	2	5	3	3	1	3	3	110
4	(United States) Robby Unser	DNS	10	1	4	5	2	2	2	97
5	(United States) John Eskuri	5	11	6	5			9	10	73

== 1989 American Indycar Series season ==
The 1989 Machinists Union American Indycar Series was the second season of the AIS. The season consisted of eight doubleheader weekends, for a total of sixteen races. Robby Unser won 12 of the 16 races, and won the season championship. Buddy Lazier only ran a part-time schedule, splitting time with his CART commitments. Lazier won three races, and finished 7th in points. Richard Griffin won one race and was declared the rookie of the year. For 1989, most entries continued to utilize the normally aspirated, stock block Chevrolet V-8 engines. However, some reportedly fielded the Cosworth DFX.

The race meet at Shangri-La was originally scheduled for August 5, but was postponed to September due to rain.

Rd.	Date	Type	Track	Location	Winner	Chassis	Engine	Tire	Laps	Miles	Ref.
1	May 21	O	Hawkeye Downs Speedway	Cedar Rapids, Iowa	Robby Unser	Lola T900	Chevrolet	H	100	50	
2	May 21	O	Hawkeye Downs Speedway	Cedar Rapids, Iowa	Robby Unser	Lola T900	Chevrolet	H	100	50	
3	June 4	O	I-70 Speedway	Odessa, Missouri	Robby Unser	Lola T900	Chevrolet	H	100	50	
4	June 4	O	I-70 Speedway	Odessa, Missouri	Robby Unser	Lola T900	Chevrolet	H	64	32	
5	June 10	R	Memphis Motorsports Park	Millington, Tennessee	Robby Unser	Lola T900	Chevrolet	H	35	63	
6	June 11	R	Memphis Motorsports Park	Millington, Tennessee	Robby Unser	Lola T900	Chevrolet	H	35	63	
7	July 4	O	Colorado National Speedway	Dacono, Colorado	Robby Unser	Lola T900	Chevrolet	H	100	37.5	
8	July 4	O	Colorado National Speedway	Dacono, Colorado	Buddy Lazier	March	Chevrolet	H	100	37.5	
9	August 20	O	Race City Speedway	Calgary, Alberta, Canada	Robby Unser	Lola T900	Chevrolet	H	125	62.5	
10	August 20	O	Race City Speedway	Calgary, Alberta, Canada	Buddy Lazier	March 86C	Chevrolet	H	125	62.5	
11	September 2	O	Colorado National Speedway	Dacono, Colorado	Robby Unser	Lola T900	Chevrolet	H	125	46.9	
12	September 3	O	Colorado National Speedway	Dacono, Colorado	Robby Unser	Lola T900	Chevrolet	H	125	46.9	
13	September 30	O	Shangri-La Motor Speedway	Owego, New York	Robby Unser	Lola T900	Chevrolet	H	100	50	
14	September 30	O	Shangri-La Motor Speedway	Owego, New York	Richard Griffin	Lola	Chevrolet	H	100	50	
15	October 29	R	Willow Springs	Rosamond, California	Buddy Lazier	March 85C	Chevrolet	H	25	62.5	
16	October 29	R	Willow Springs	Rosamond, California	Robby Unser	Lola T900	Chevrolet	H	25	62.5	

O Oval
R Road course

=== Race summaries ===
- Rounds 1 & 2: The first two races of the season were held at the 1/2 mile oval at Hawkeye Downs Speedway in Cedar Rapids, Iowa. Robby Unser won both of the 100-lap races, leading a total of 197 of the 200 possible laps. Bill Scott, driving an ethanol-powered machine, finished a close second in both races. The margin of victory was 3.75 seconds for the first race, and 1.47 seconds for the second race. Unser and Scott were the only drivers to complete all 200 laps. Bill Tempero qualified for the pole position for both races, but spun in an oil slick during the first race, then later burned a piston. Unser drove the weekend with a leg brace, after undergoing surgery for a broken leg he suffered in 1987. Kenji Momota made his AIS debut, finishing third in the second race.
- Rounds 3 & 4: The second race meet was held at the 1/2 mile oval at I-70 Speedway. Both Buddy Lazier (the 1988 AIS champion) and Kevin Whitesides (1989 AIS rookie of the year) returned to the series after they missed the first meet. Both were attempting to qualify (unsuccessfully) for the Indy 500. In the first race, Robby Unser started on the pole position and led the first 29 laps. Buddy Lazier took the lead on lap 30, and the two drivers raced-nose-to-tail most of the way. Unser got by Lazier for the lead on lap 87, and held him off on the last by 0.3 seconds. Meanwhile, Whitesides suffered a fuel pressure problem, and was not able to race. Bill Tempero also dropped out with engine problems on lap 81. In the second race, Robby Unser again started on the pole. On lap 10, Buddy Lazier bumped wheels with Michael Leary, and crashed into the wall in turn one. Unser pulled away and was leading when the race was stopped on lap 64 due to rain. Unser was declared the winner, with Bill Scott second.
- Rounds 5 & 6: The Mid-South Indy 200 was held at Memphis Motorsports Park. The event was scheduled as twin 100-kilometer races on the 1.8-mile road course. Bill Tempero started on the pole for the first race, and Robby Unser was the winner. In the second race, Buddy Lazier started on the pole, but dropped out on lap 4 with mechanical problems. Unser won by 3.85 seconds over Tempero, making it six consecutive victories to start the season.
- Rounds 7 & 8: The fourth race meet was held on the 3/8 mile oval at Colorado National Speedway. Twin 100-lap races were held on Tuesday July 4. Due to oppressive heat, and 165° track temperature, the races were delayed for two hours. Bill Tempero won the pole for the first race. Robby Unser took the checkered flag, his seventh consecutive victory to start the season. Unser won by 2 seconds over Tempero, and Buddy Lazier finished third. In the second race, Buddy Lazier finally snapped Unser's win streak. Lazier took the checkered flag for his first win of the season. Unser finished a close second, with polesitter Tempero third. After eight races, the halfway point of the season, Robby Unser (196) led the points standings, with Bill Scott (127) ranked second.
- Rounds 9 & 10: The AIS traveled to Canada for the second time, holding twin 125-lap races at Race City. On Friday, Bob Tankersley won the second annual pit stop contest at Stephen Avenue mall. Kenji Momota withdrew due to a family illness, and he was replaced by Buzz Tapley. The first race was scheduled for Saturday August 19, but due to heavy rain, it was postponed to Sunday afternoon. Robby Unser won the pole with a track record of 14.9 seconds, and led from start to finish. Buddy Lazier finished second, but not without incident. Bill Tempero broke an oil pump in his primary car on lap 22. He parked his car in the pits, then he took over the team's back-up car (started by Arlon Koops). As Tempro was exiting the pits, he nearly tangled with Lazier, sending Lazier's car into a spin. Lazier was able to recover, and worked his way back up to second place by lap 89. Bill Scott came home third. In the second race, Greg Gorden won the pole with a new track record of 14.77 seconds. Gorden led until lap 56, when Robby Unser took over the lead. On lap 98, however, Unser suffered a broken rear end. Gorden veered to avoid contact, but spun and seized the engine. Both the first place and second place cars were out, putting Buddy Lazier into the lead. Lazier cruised to the finish, nursing a damaged gearbox. Bill Tempero finished second, driving the team's back-up car once again. After ten rounds, Robby Unser held a commanding points lead (254 points) over Bill Scott (137) and Buddy Lazier (143). Richard Griffin (133) was the leading rookie, and Bill Tempero (128) rounded out the top five.
- Rounds 11 & 12: Robby Unser swept both races over Labor Day weekend at Colorado National Speedway. Unser (294 points) extended his championship points lead to almost 100 points over his nearest competitor Bill Scott.
- Rounds 13 & 14: After being rained out in August, the race meet at Shangri-La was rescheduled for the last weekend of September. On a cold, damp night, with temperatures in the 40s, Robby Unser won the first race in dominating fashion, his 11th victory of the season. Richard Griffin finished second. During the second race, Unser dropped out on lap 87 with a failed right-front wheel bearing, his first DNF of the season. Griffin won the second race, his first AIS victory. Johnny Unser made his AIS debut, with a pair of 6th place finishes, driving as a teammate to his cousin Robby. Despite dropping out of the second race, Robby Unser left the weekend with enough points to mathematically clinch the 1989 AIS championship.
- Rounds 15 & 16: The season finale was held at Willow Springs. Bill Tempero won the pole for both races. Buddy Lazier won the first race, with Robby Unser finishing second. In the second race, Lazier dropped out with a broken motor mount. Robby Unser won the second race, his 12th victory of the season, and 13th career AIS victory overall.

=== Final points standings (Top five) ===
Pos	Driver	R1 (United States)	R2 (United States)	R3 (United States)	R4 (United States)	R5 (United States)	R6 (United States)	R7 (United States)	R8 (United States)	R9 (Canada)	R10 (Canada)	R11 (United States)	R12 (United States)	R13 (United States)	R14 (United States)	R15 (United States)	R16 (United States)	Pts
1	(United States) Robby Unser	1	1	1	1	1	1	1	2	5	1	1	1	DNF	1	2	1	392
2	(United States) Bill Scott	2	2	3	2	?	3	?	?	3	10	?	?	?	?	?	?	?
3	(United States) Richard Griffin RY	4	5	7	DNS	?	10	6	?	4	9	?	?	2	1	?	?	?
5	(United States) Bill Tempero	11	12	10	DNS	?	2	2	3	11	12	?	?	?	?	?	?	185

== 1990 American Indycar Series season ==
The 1990 Machinist Union American Indycar Series was the third season of the AIS. The season consisted of eight races, but one event was rained out. Doubleheader weekends were eliminated, and the series conducted its first race on a street circuit. Bill Tempero, founder of the series, won four of the seven rounds, and won the championship for the first time. Johnny Unser won two races, finished second in points, and was named the rookie of the year. Robby Unser, the 1989 champion, only drove a part-time schedule for 1990, and managed to win one race, the 14th of his AIS career.

The season finale was held on a street course in Halifax, Nova Scotia on Canadian Thanksgiving. Johnny Unser was leading the 25-lap Moosehead Grand Prix on the final lap when he crashed just short of the finish line. Bill Tempero sped by to take the checkered flag, and in doing so, clinched the points championship in dramatic fashion.

Rd.	Date	Type	Track	Location	Winner	Chassis	Engine	Laps	Miles	Ref.
1	May 6	R	Willow Springs	Rosamond, California	Bill Tempero	March 88C	Chevrolet	25	62.5	
2	June 3	O	I-70 Speedway	Odessa, Missouri	Robby Unser	Lola T900	Chevrolet	300	150	
3	June 17	R	Hallett Motor Racing Circuit	Hallett, Oklahoma	Bill Tempero	March	Chevrolet	35	63	
4	July 1	O	Lee USA Speedway	Lee, New Hampshire	Johnny Unser	Lola	Chevrolet	200	75	
5	July 15	O	Colorado National Speedway	Dacono, Colorado	Johnny Unser	Lola	Chevrolet	150	56.25	
6	September 2	O	Hawkeye Downs Speedway	Cedar Rapids, Iowa	Cancelled due to rain			125	62.5	
7	September 16	R	Gateway International Raceway	Madison, Illinois	Bill Tempero	March	Chevrolet	100	90	
8	October 8	R	Citadel Hill Park street course	Halifax, Nova Scotia	Bill Tempero	March	Chevrolet	25	28.75	

=== Final points standings (Top three) ===
Pos	Driver	R1 (United States)	R2 (United States)	R3 (United States)	R4 (United States)	R5 (United States)	R6 (United States)	R7 (United States)	R8 (Canada)	Pts
1	(United States) Bill Tempero	1	3	1	2	2	C	1	1	150
2	(United States) Johnny Unser RY	2	2	3	1	1	C	2	3	145
3	(United States) Bill Hansen	?	4	8	6	?	C	3	?	100

== 1991 American Indycar Series season ==
The 1991 American Indycar Series was the fourth season of the AIS. Bill Tempero won five of the nine races, and won his second consecutive AIS championship. Jimmy Santos, winner of one race, was declared the rookie of the year. A race on a temporary circuit at the Indiana State Fairgrounds was planned, but failed to materialize. A replacement race at Indianapolis Raceway Park was tentatively slated for October 13, but it too was cancelled. Instead, the series raced at Benton County Speedway in Chase, Indiana. It was the first Indy car race in the state of Indiana (outside of the Indianapolis 500) since the 1970 Hoosier Hundred. For the first time, the AIS traveled to Mexico, with two separate events.

Rd.	Date	Type	Track	Location	Winner	Chassis	Engine	Laps	Miles	Ref.
1	June 2	R	Hallett Motor Racing Circuit	Hallett, Oklahoma	Bill Tempero	March	Chevrolet	35	63	
2	June 23	R	Parque Chamizal	Ciudad Juárez, Mexico	Kevin Whitesides	March	Chevrolet	91	127.4	
3	July 6	O	Nashville Motor Raceway	Nashville, Tennessee	Kevin Whitesides	March	Chevrolet	200	119.2	
-	July 7	R	Indiana State Fairgrounds street course	Indianapolis, Indiana	Race cancelled					
4	July 28	O	Colorado National Speedway	Dacono, Colorado	Bill Tempero	March	Chevrolet	150	75	
5	August 18	R	Bonneville Raceway Park	West Valley City, Utah	Bill Tempero	March	Chevrolet	45	63	
-	September 2	O	Milwaukee Mile	West Allis, Wisconsin	Race cancelled					
6	September 15	R	Citadel Hill Park street course	Halifax, Nova Scotia	Jimmy Santo	March	Chevrolet	120	138	
7	October 12	O	Benton County Speedway	Chase, Indiana	Bill Tempero	March	Chevrolet	150	56.25	
-	October 13		Indianapolis Raceway Park	Clermont, Indiana	Race cancelled					
8	October 27	R	Willow Springs	Rosamond, California	Nicola Marozzo	Lola T91/00	Cosworth DFX	40	101.6	
9	November 24	R	Streets of Garza García	Monterrey, Mexico	Bill Tempero	March	Chevrolet	100	110	

=== Final points standings (Top five) ===
Pos	Driver	R1 (United States)	R2 (Mexico)	R3 (United States)	R4 (United States)	R5 (United States)	R6 (Canada)	R7 (United States)	R8 (United States)	R9 (Mexico)	Pts
1	(United States) Bill Tempero	1	7	8	1	1	2	1	2	1	179
2	(United States) Robby Unser	1	4	2	6	4	4	9	2	4	158
3	(United States) Kevin Whitesides	6	1	1	3	6	8	3	15	5	150
4	(United States) Ken Petrie	3	3	13	2	3	3	4	9	2	145
5	(United States) Johnny Unser	8	5	3	9	10	14	11	3	DNP	109

== 1992-2003 ==
=== 1992 American Indycar Series season ===
An eleven-race schedule was announced in May 1992, but multiple revisions were made. The final schedule consisted of five races, with Rod Bennett the season champion. Races at Blackhawk Farms, Biggs Army Airfield, Birmingham, Colorado, Utah, San Juan, Garza García, and Guadalajara were all either cancelled or failed to materialize.

Rd.	Date	Track	Location	Winner	Chassis	Engine	Laps	Miles	Ref.
1	June 21	Hallett Motor Racing Circuit	Hallett, Oklahoma	Bill Tempero	March	Pontiac	35	63	
2	August 1	Bonneville Raceway Park	West Valley City, Utah	Jimmy Santos	March	Chevrolet	150	56.25	
3	August 23	Second Creek Raceway	Denver, Colorado	Ken Petrie	March	Chevrolet	88	149.6	
4	September 13	Citadel Hill Park street course	Halifax, Nova Scotia	Ken Petrie	March	Chevrolet	75	86.25	
5	November 1	Willow Springs	Rosamond, California	Johnny Unser	Lola	Cosworth DFX	60	152.4	

=== 1993 American Indycar Series season ===
The 1993 AIS season schedule consisted of 8 to 10 races. Rick Sutherland was the season champion. Races at ARCO Arena, I-70 Speedway (rained out), Sears Point, and possibly other venues were either cancelled or failed to materialize. The season finale was a doubleheader at Willow Springs.

Date	Track	Location	Winner	Laps	Miles	Ref.
May 9	Willow Springs	Rosamond, California	Rick Sutherland	60	152.4	
June 6	Reno Grand Prix	Reno, Nevada	Rick Sutherland	150	150	
June 20	Mountain View Motorsports Park	Mead, Colorado	Rod Bennett			
August 7	Bonneville Raceway Park	West Valley City, Utah	Jimmy Santos	150	56.25	
September 25	I-70 Speedway	Odessa, Missouri	Rained out	200	100	
November 20	Willow Springs	Rosamond, California	John Morton	40	101.6	
November 21	Willow Springs	Rosamond, California	Bill Tempero	40	101.6	

=== 1994 American Indycar Series season ===
Bill Tempero was the 1994 season champion.

Date	Track	Location	Winner	Ref.
April 30	Willow Springs	Rosamond, California	Bill Tempero	
May 1	Willow Springs	Rosamond, California	Bill Tempero	
June 6	Tri-City Raceway	West Richland, Washington	Ken Petrie	
July 17	Mountain View Motorsports Park	Mead, Colorado	Ken Petrie	
August 27	Suntana Raceway	Springville, Utah		
November 6	Willow Springs	Rosamond, California		

=== 1995 American Indycar Series season ===
Date	Track	Location	Winner
May 14	Willow Springs	Rosamond, California	Bill Tempero
May 27	Suntana Raceway	Springville, Utah	Bill Tempero
July 2	Toledo Speedway	Toledo, Ohio	Race cancelled
July 29	Fort Collins Airpark	Fort Collins, Colorado	
July 30	Fort Collins Airpark	Fort Collins, Colorado	
September 2	Las Vegas Speedway Park	North Las Vegas, Nevada	Jimmy Santos
September 17	Hallett Motor Racing Circuit	Hallett, Oklahoma	
October 8	Lakeside Speedway	Kansas City, Kansas	
October 29	Baja California	Ensenada, Mexico	
November 12	Willow Springs	Rosamond, California	

=== 1996 American Indycar Series season ===
Date	Track	Location	Winner
June 1	Suntana Raceway	Springville, Utah	Ken Petrie
June 29	Race City Speedway	Calgary, Alberta, Canada	Jimmy Santos
June 30	Race City Speedway	Calgary, Alberta, Canada	Bill Tempero
July 13	Fort Collins Airpark	Fort Collins, Colorado	Ken Petrie
July 14	Fort Collins Airpark	Fort Collins, Colorado	Jaques Lazier
August 4	I-94 Speedway	Sauk Centre, Minnesota	Greg Gordon
November 24	San Juan street circuit	San Juan, Puerto Rico	

=== 1997 American Indycar Series season ===
Date	Track	Location	Winner
June 30	Baja California	Ensenada, Mexico	Jimmy Santos
June 1	Suntana Raceway	Springville, Utah	
August 10	Hawkeye Downs Speedway	Cedar Rapids, Iowa	Greg Gordon
August 16	Race City Speedway	Calgary, Alberta, Canada	Bill Tempero
September	Tri-City Raceway	West Richland, Washington	Greg Gordon

=== 1998 American Indycar Series season ===
In May 1998, the original founder Bill Tempero sold the series to Pan American Motorsports Inc. The original ten-race schedule was reduced to five rounds.

Date	Track	Location	Winner	Chassis	Engine
April 5	Hallett Motor Racing Circuit	Hallett, Oklahoma	Shayne Stephens	Lola	Buick-Menard
June 13	Magic Valley Speedway	Twin Falls, Idaho	Mike Lee	March	Chevrolet
July 28	Hawkeye Downs Speedway	Cedar Rapids, Iowa	Ken Petrie	March	Chevrolet
September 20	Race City Speedway	Calgary, Alberta, Canada	Ken Petrie	March	Chevrolet
September 20	Birmingham International Raceway	Birmingham, Alabama	Greg Gorden	Lola	Buick-Menard

=== 1999 American Indycar Series season ===
Date	Track	Location	Winner	Chassis	Engine
May 23	La Crosse Fairgrounds Speedway	West Salem, Wisconsin	Ken Petrie	March	Chevrolet
June 20	Mountain View Motorsports Park	Mead, Colorado	Bill Tempero	Lola	Buick-Menard
July 10	Magic Valley Speedway	Twin Falls, Idaho	Jimmy Santos	Lola	Chevrolet
September 5	Los Angeles Street Race	Los Angeles	Bill Tempero	Lola	Buick-Menard

=== 2000 American Indycar Series season ===
Date	Track	Location	Winner	Chassis	Engine
May 19	Hallett Motor Racing Circuit	Hallett, Oklahoma	Greg Gorden	Lola	Buick-Menard
July 3	St. Johns Airpark	St. Johns, Arizona	Jimmy Santos	Reynard	Ilmor Mercedes-Benz
August 14	Pueblo Motorsports Park	Pueblo, Colorado	Juan Carlos Carbonell	Lola	Buick-Menard
October 16	Sears Point Raceway	Sonoma, California	Juan Carlos Carbonell	Lola	Buick-Menard
November 26	Phoenix International Raceway	Avondale, Arizona	Mike Lee	G-Force	Oldsmobile Aurora

=== 2002 American Indycar Series season ===
The original Bill Tempero-created series ceased after the 2000 season. A continuation of the original AIS was attempted by a group led by Barry Brooke and Bobby Brooks. Five races were scheduled for 2002, but only two weekend meets (three races) are known to have been held. A tentative schedule for 2003 was announced, but the series folded before any were held.

Rd.	Date	Track	Location	Winner
1	April 21	Las Vegas Motor Speedway	North Las Vegas, Nevada	Ehud "Eddie" Nahir
–	May 19	Thunderhill Raceway Park	Willows, California	Race cancelled
2	June 23	California Speedway road course	Fontana, California	Ehud "Eddie" Nahir
3	June 23	California Speedway road course	Fontana, California	Ehud "Eddie" Nahir
–	October 6	Willow Springs	Rosamond, California	Race cancelled
–	November 24	Phoenix International Raceway	Avondale, Arizona	Race cancelled
–	December 15	Aloha Grand Prix	Honolulu, Hawaii	Race cancelled

==== 2003 Tentative schedule ====
Date	Track	Location
February 19	Fundidora Park	Monterrey, Mexico
March 23	California Speedway road course	Fontana, California
April 27	Las Vegas Motor Speedway	North Las Vegas, Nevada
May 18	Willow Springs	Rosamond, California
September 21	Phoenix International Raceway	Avondale, Arizona
October 5	Laguna Seca Raceway	Monterey, California

== United States Speedway Series ==
A different management team formed a new series titled the United States Speedway Series (USSS) in 2001. It ran under mostly the same format as AIS, and attracted some of the former AIS drivers and teams. USSS utilized chassis from CART and the first generation of IRL (G-Force and Dallara); with a variety of normally aspirated and turbocharged engines. Most of the races were on road courses and/or "rovals" in the western U.S.

=== 2001 season ===
Date	Track	Location	Winner	Chassis	Engine
April 8	Las Vegas Motor Speedway (road)	Las Vegas, Nevada	Ken Petrie	Precision March	Chevrolet
May 13	Pikes Peak International Raceway	Fountain, Colorado	Ken Petrie	Precision March	Chevrolet
June 16	Sandia Motorsports Park	Albuquerque, New Mexico	Mike Lee	Hoffpauir Lola	Buick-Menard
July 14	Dodge City Raceway Park	Dodge City, Kansas	Phil Erickson	Fast Line Lola	Buick-Menard
August 25	Sandia Motorsports Park	Albuquerque, New Mexico	Ken Petrie	Precision March	Chevrolet
September 30	Firebird International Raceway	Chandler, Arizona	Ken Petrie	Precision March	Chevrolet
October 14	Pikes Peak International Raceway	Fountain, Colorado	Greg Gorden	G-Force	Oldsmobile Aurora
November 25	Firebird International Raceway	Chandler, Arizona	Greg Gorden	G-Force	Oldsmobile Aurora

=== 2002 season ===
Date	Track	Location	Winner	Chassis	Engine
April 20	San Antonio Speedway	San Antonio	Ken Petrie	Fast Line Lola	Buick-Menard
May 5	Pikes Peak International Raceway	Fountain, Colorado	Greg Gorden	G-Force	Oldsmobile Aurora
June 15	Dodge City Raceway Park	Dodge City, Kansas	Ken Petrie	Precision March	Chevrolet
July 27	Magic Valley Speedway	Twin Falls, Idaho	Ken Petrie	Precision March	Chevrolet
August 18	Pueblo Motorsports Park	Pueblo, Colorado	Mike Lee	Hoffpauir Lola	Buick-Menard
September 7	Sandia Motorsports Park	Albuquerque, New Mexico	Ken Petrie	Precision March	Chevrolet
October 5	Las Vegas Motor Speedway	Las Vegas, Nevada	Ken Petrie	Precision March	Chevrolet
December 1	Firebird International Raceway	Chandler, Arizona			

=== 2003 season ===
Date	Track	Location	Winner	Chassis	Engine
April 12	San Antonio Speedway	San Antonio	Eric Koselke	March	Chevrolet
May 4	Pikes Peak International Raceway (road)	Fountain, Colorado	Greg Gorden	G-Force	Oldsmobile Aurora
May 18	Pueblo Motorsports Park	Pueblo, Colorado	Ken Petrie	March	Chevrolet
June 22	California Speedway (road course)	Fontana, California	Mike Koss	Lola	Buick-Menard
July 26	Magic Valley Speedway	Twin Falls, Idaho	Mike Koss	Dallara	Oldsmobile Aurora
August 16	Sandia Motorsports Park	Albuquerque, New Mexico	Mike Lee	Lola	Buick-Menard
September 1	St. Johns Airport	St. Johns, Arizona	Ken Petrie	Precision March	Chevrolet
September 14	Pikes Peak International Raceway (road)	Fountain, Colorado	Greg Gorden	G-Force	Oldsmobile Aurora
October 4	Las Vegas Motor Speedway	Las Vegas, Nevada	Mike Lee	Lola	Buick-Menard

=== 2004 season ===
Date	Track	Location	Winner
February 1	Phoenix International Raceway	Avondale, Arizona	Greg Gordon
March 9	California Speedway	Fontana, California	
May 9	Pikes Peak International Raceway road course	Fountain, Colorado	Greg Gordon
June 26	Sandia Motorsports Park	Albuquerque, New Mexico	Greg Gordon
July 7	Pueblo Motorsports Park	Pueblo, Colorado	Andrew Furia
August 29	Pikes Peak International Raceway road course	Fountain, Colorado	Greg Gordon
October 3	Pikes Peak International Raceway road course	Fountain, Colorado	Greg Gordon
November 7	Pueblo Motorsports Park	Pueblo, Colorado	Greg Gordon

=== 2005 season ===
Date	Track	Location	Winner
May 8	Pikes Peak International Raceway road course	Fountain, Colorado	Jim Webb
July 17	Pikes Peak International Raceway road course	Fountain, Colorado	Ken Petrie
September 4	Pueblo Motorsports Park	Pueblo, Colorado	Bailey Dotson
October 10	Pikes Peak International Raceway road course	Fountain, Colorado	Jim Webb
November 6	Pueblo Motorsports Park	Pueblo, Colorado	Ken Petrie

== Champions ==
Season	Driver
American Indycar Series
1988	Buddy Lazier
1989	Robby Unser
1990	Bill Tempero
1991	Bill Tempero
1992	Rod Bennett
1993	Rick Sutherland
1994	Bill Tempero
1995	Bill Tempero
1996	Ken Petrie
1997	Ken Petrie
1998	Greg Gorden
1999	Bill Tempero
2000	Mike Lee
2002	Eddie Nahir
United States Speedway Series
2001	Ken Petrie
2002	Ken Petrie
2003	Mike Koss
2004	Greg Gorden
2005	Bailey Dotson
