= Hoosier Racing Tire =

American tire manufacturing company

- Type: Subsidiary
- Industry: Manufacturing
- Founded: 1957; 69 years ago
- Founders: Robert Newton; Joyce Newton
- Headquarters: Lakeville, Indiana, U.S.
- Area served: Worldwide
- Key people: Joerg Burfien (President and CEO)
- Products: Tires
- Parent: Continental AG
- Website: hoosiertire.com

Hoosier Racing Tire is a subsidiary of Continental AG that primarily specialises in the production of tires for race competition use. Headquartered in Lakeville, Indiana, the company was founded in 1957. Hoosier employs nearly 600 people, and has provided tires for use in series sanctioned by IHRA, NHRA, ARCA, CRA, NASCAR, IMCA, WISSOTA, SCCA, NASA, AIS, USAC, World of Outlaws, Lucas Oil Late Model Dirt Series and FIA World Rallycross Championship. Hoosier makes tires aimed at both amateurs and professionals competing in a variety of disciplines including stock car racing, road racing, dirt track racing, drag racing, rallying, and more.

Hoosier Tire was purchased by Continental AG on October 4, 2016. The tire company was purchased for a total nearing $155 million. Following the purchase, 31-year veteran John DeSalle was named president. Following DeSalle's retirement in 2020, Joerg Burfien was named president and CEO.

== History ==
Hoosier Racing Tire was founded in 1957 in Lakeville, Indiana, by stock car racer Robert Newton, and Joyce Newton. Newton wished to design a faster tire compound to gain an advantage against fellow racers. This was done by retreading street tires in order to obtain a compound that would adequately gain enough traction. Using an abandoned barn in South Bend, Indiana, to start his business, he began sales to local racers. The Hoosier logo is colored after Newton's race car at the time which was purple.

The founder of Hoosier Racing Tire, Robert Newton, died in 2012, aged 85, at his home in Lakeville. His wife and co–founder, Joyce Newton, died aged 85 on January 16, 2018.

Continental Tire produces most motorsport–related tires at the Plymouth, Indiana, tire plant, carrying the Hoosier, Continental, and General Tire tire brands.

== Gallery ==
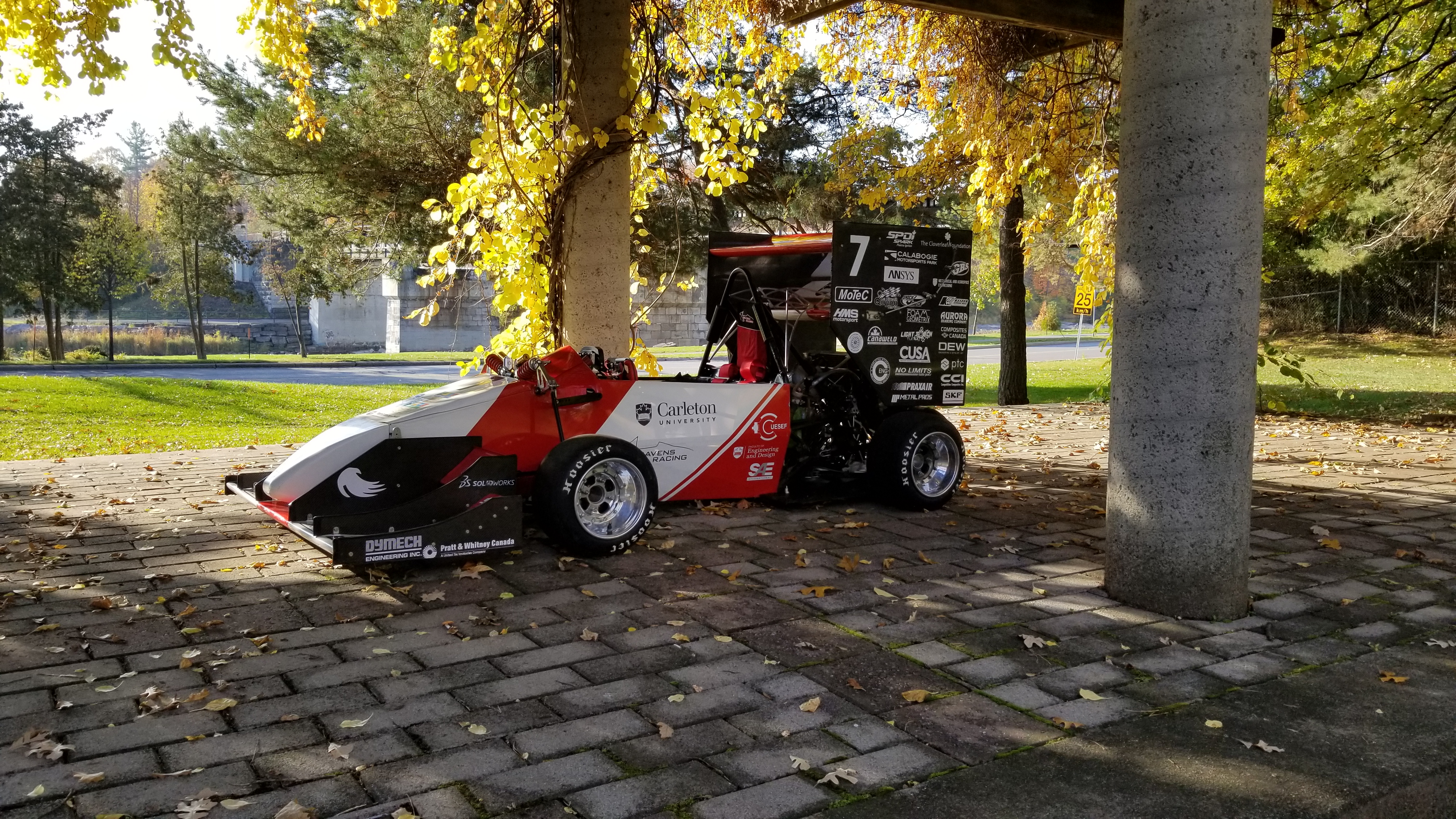
Carleton University Formula Student car with Hoosier tires.

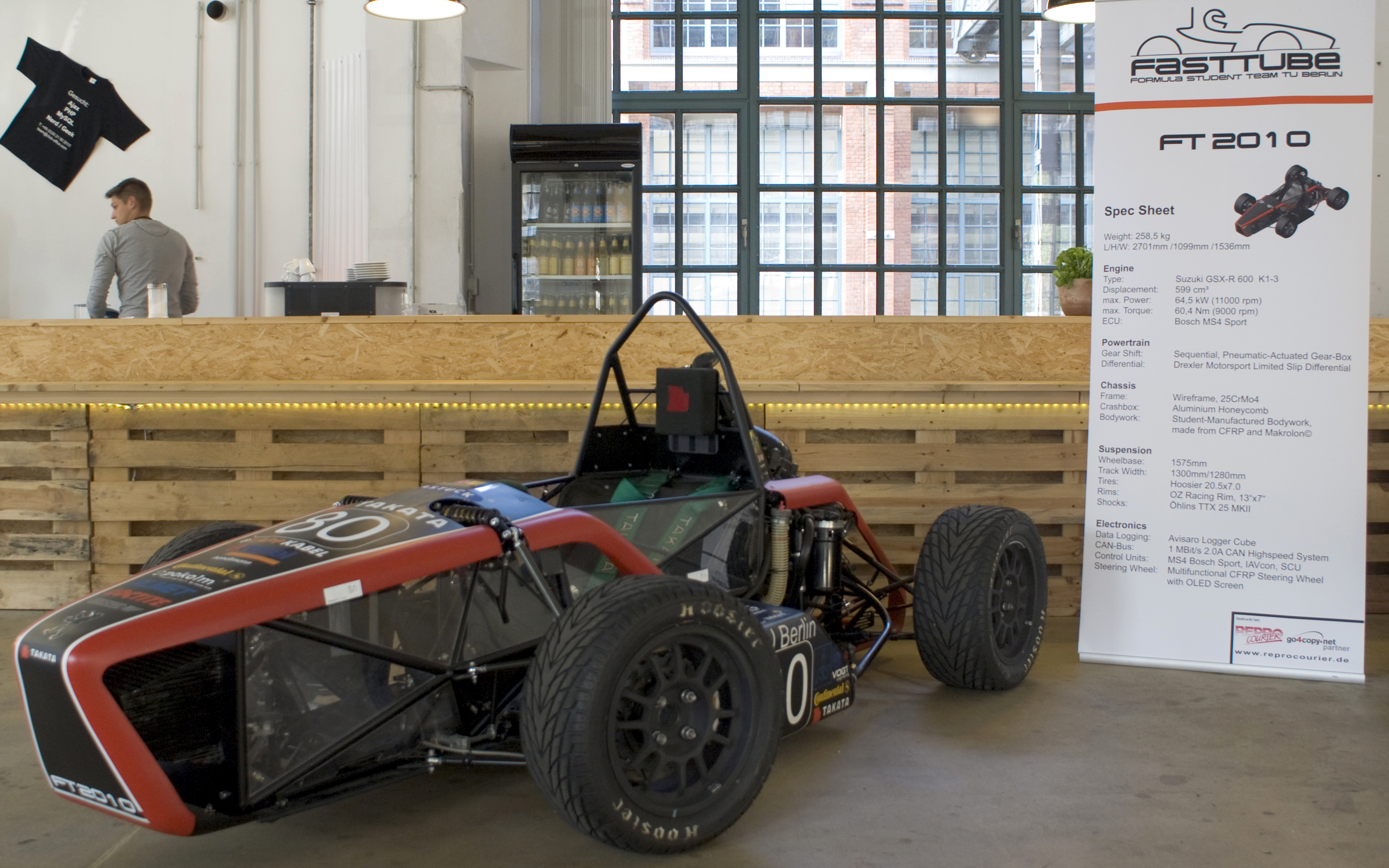
Formula Student with Hoosier tires.

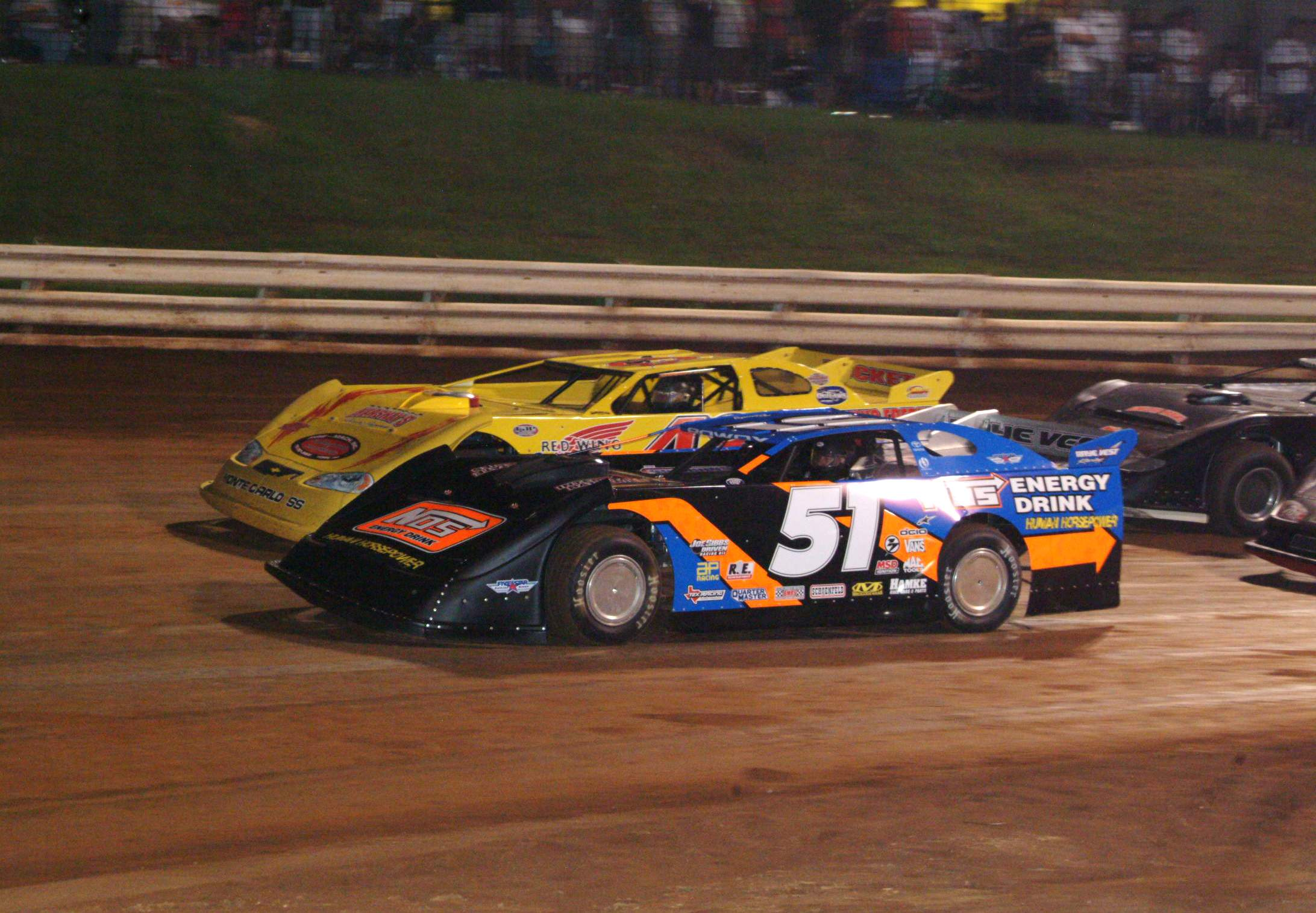
Kyle Busch Dirt Late Model with Hoosier Tires.

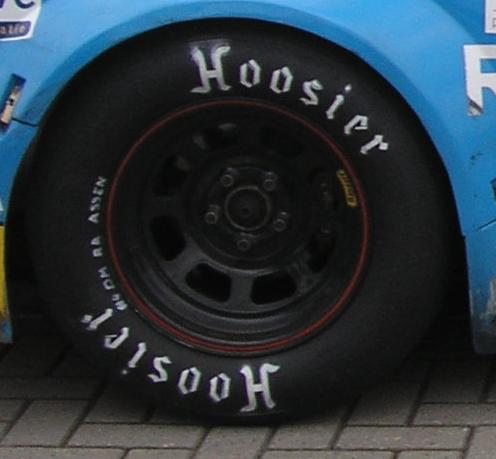
A Hoosier Racing Tire.

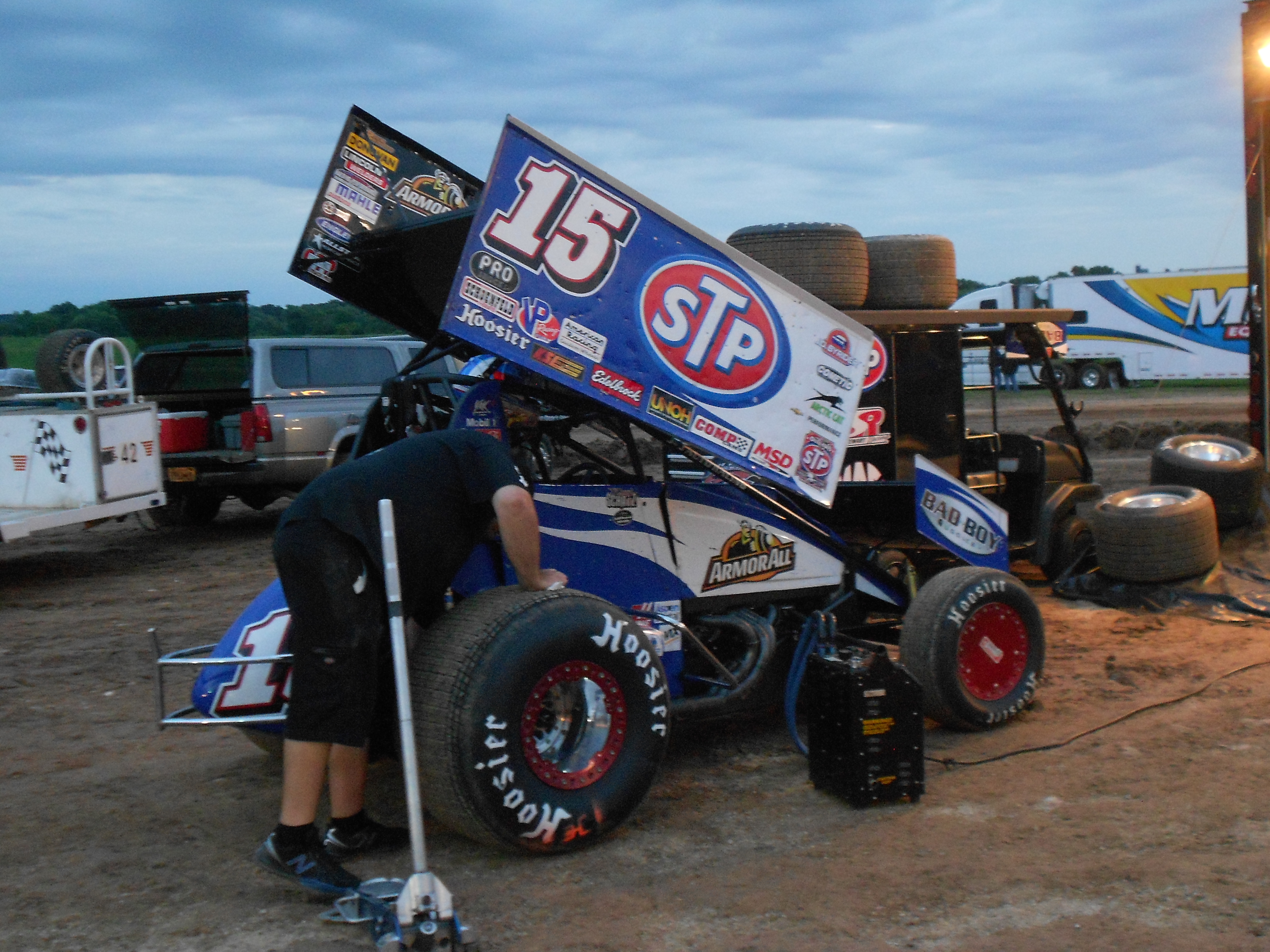
Donny Schatz World of Outlaw Sprint Car with Hoosier Tires.

== See also ==
- List of tire companies
