= Bill Tempero =

American racing driver

Bill Tempero (born January 16, 1944) is an American former racing driver from Milwaukee. He raced in the CART Championship Car series from 1980 to 1984 competing in full seasons his first two years and partial schedules thereafter. He failed to qualify for both the races he attempted in 1984, so he was not credited with a race start that season. Tempero finished twentieth in CART points in 1980 with two top-ten finishes including his series-best result of 6th place at the Milwaukee Mile while driving for Hopkins Racing. He fielded his own car in 1981 and 32nd in points without a single top-ten. He attempted to qualify for the Indianapolis 500 in 1980, 1981, and 1983 but failed to make the field in 1980 and 1983 and crashed while attempting to qualify in 1981.

After a decline in his performance in CART as costs and talent levels rose throughout the 1980s, Tempero went to the declining Can-Am series in 1984 and finished fourth and second in championship points in his two seasons in the series, the series' final two years of operation in 1985 and 1986.

After the short stint, Can-Am finally folded, and Tempero led an effort to create a new series, the American Indycar Series in 1988. Tempero dominated the second-tier series, which featured year-old (and older) chassis from CART competition.

Tempero attempted to return to top-level open wheel racing in the Indy Racing League's first race at the Walt Disney World Speedway in 1996. His four-year-old Lola/Buick V6 failed to make the field, but the team continued to enter IRL races throughout 1996 for other drivers.

Following his retirement from racing, Tempero pursued his interest in history, and currently serves as the president of the United States Cavalry Association.

== Motorsport results ==
=== CART ===
(key) (Races in bold indicate pole position)

Year	Team	Chassis	Engine	1	2	3	4	5	6	7	8	9	10	11	12	13	14	15	16	Rank	Points
1980	Tempero Racing	Eagle 74	Chevrolet Indy V8	ONT; 17	INDY; DNQ	MIL; 16	POC	MDO; 17	MCH; 17	WGL; 15	MIL; 6	ONT; 18	MCH; 16	MXC; 8	PHX; 11					**20th**	**331**
1981	Tempero Racing	McLaren M24	Chevrolet Indy V8	PHX; 18	MIL	ATL; 15	ATL; 14	MCH; 34	RIV; 28	MIL; 17	MCH; 15	WGL; 23	MXC; 12	PHX; DNQ						**32nd**	**7**
1982	Tempero Racing	Longhorn LR-01	Chevrolet Indy V8	PHX; DNQ	ATL	MIL	CLE; 8	MCH	MIL; 19	POC	RIV; 14	ROA; 18	MCH	PHX; DNQ						**29th**	**22**
1983	Tempero Racing	Longhorn LR-01	Chevrolet Indy V8	ATL	INDY; DNQ	MIL	CLE; 23	MCH	ROA; DNQ	POC	RIV	MDO; 21	MCH	CPL	LAG	PHX				**49th**	**0**
1984	Alsup Racing	Longhorn LR-01	Chevrolet Indy V8	LBH; DNQ	PHX	INDY	MIL	POR	MEA	CLE	MCH									NC	—
1984	Jet Engineering	March 84C	Cosworth DFX V8t									ROA; DNQ	POC	MDO	SAN	MCH	PHX	LAG	CPL	NC	—

=== IRL IndyCar ===
(key) (Races in bold indicate pole position; races in italics indicate fastest lap)

Year	Team	Chassis	No.	Engine	1	2	3	Rank	Points	Ref
1996	Tempero-Giuffre Racing	Lola T92/00	15	Buick V6	WDW; Wth	PHX	INDY	NC	—	

=== SCCA National Championship Runoffs ===
Year	Track	Car	Engine	Class	Finish	Start	Status
1973	Road Atlanta	Lola T192	Chevrolet	Formula A	4	4	Running
1975	Road Atlanta	Merlyn Mk. 29	Ford Kent	Formula Ford	19	24	Running
1976	Road Atlanta	Royale	Ford Kent	Formula Ford	25	12	Not running
