= Los Angeles Street Race =

Ford Los Angeles Street Race

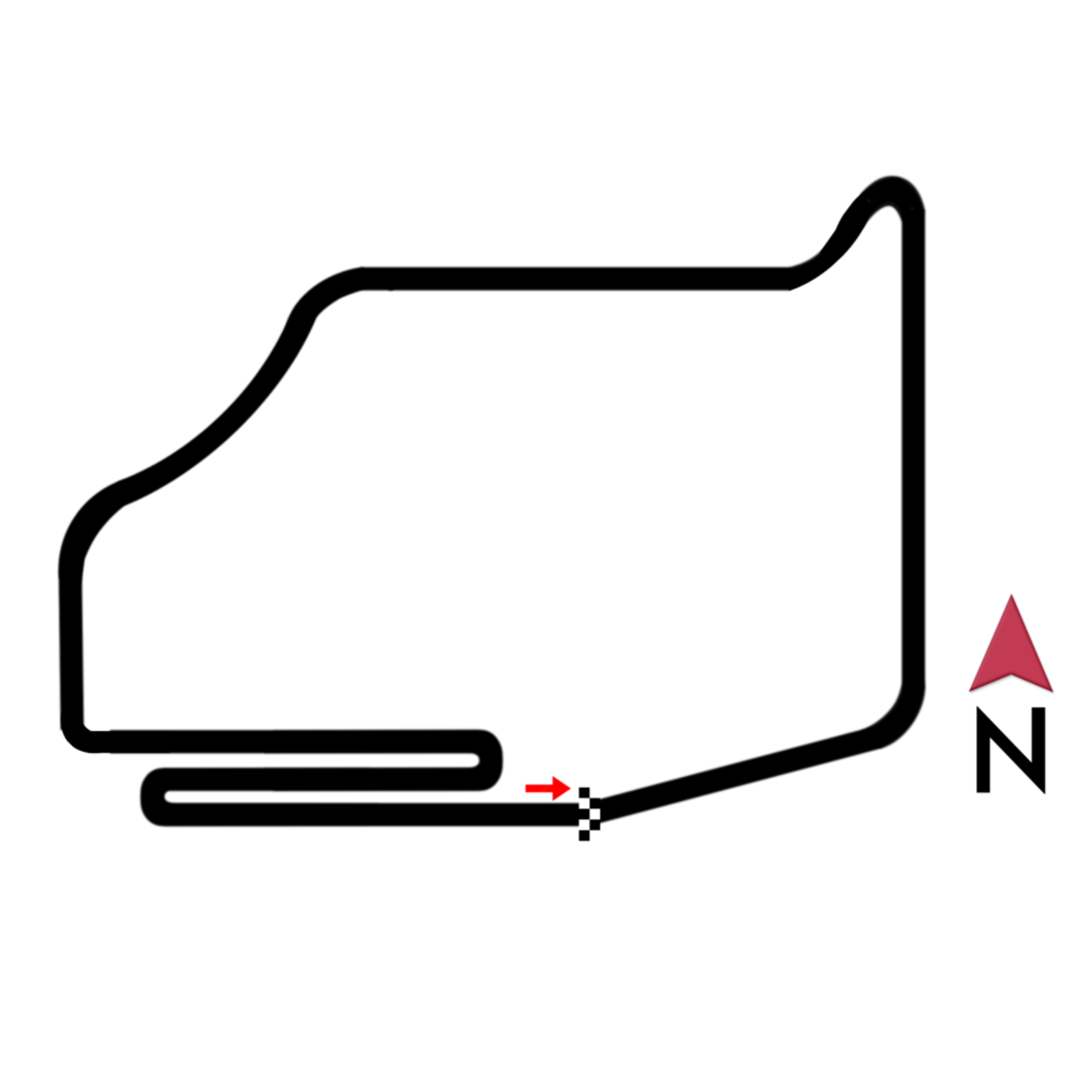

NASCAR Featherlite Southwest Tour
- Location: Los Angeles, California; 34°0′50″N 118°17′8″W
- Corporate sponsor: Ford Motor Company
- First race: 1997
- First NFSWT race: 1998
- Last race: 2000
- Distance: 137.5 mi (221.3 km)
- Laps: 125
- Previous names: Ford Los Angeles Grand Prix Vintage Races & Concours (1997); Kragen Z-One 200 (1998); Ford Los Angeles Street Race 200 (1999-2000)

Circuit information
- Length: 1.1 mi (1.8 km)
- Turns: 8
- Lap record: 0:51.145 ( (United States) Greg Pursley, Chevrolet Monte Carlo, 2000, NFSWT)

The Los Angeles Street Race, (officially named the Ford L.A. Street Race due to naming rights), was a NASCAR Featherlite Southwest Tour race held on a temporary street circuit in the Exposition Park area of Los Angeles.

== Vintage Races (1997) ==
=== Background ===
In 1997, Dr. William Arthur “Bill” Burke, who had previously organized the Los Angeles Marathon, along with his company, LA Events, debuted the “Ford Los Angeles Grand Prix Vintage Races & Concours” which consisted of vintage cars, sanctioned by the Vintage Auto Racing Association (VARA), racing around a 1.6 mile temporary street circuit with 11 turns, in front of Union Station, around Olvera Street, and over the U.S. 101 Hollywood Freeway in Downtown Los Angeles on Labor Day weekend.

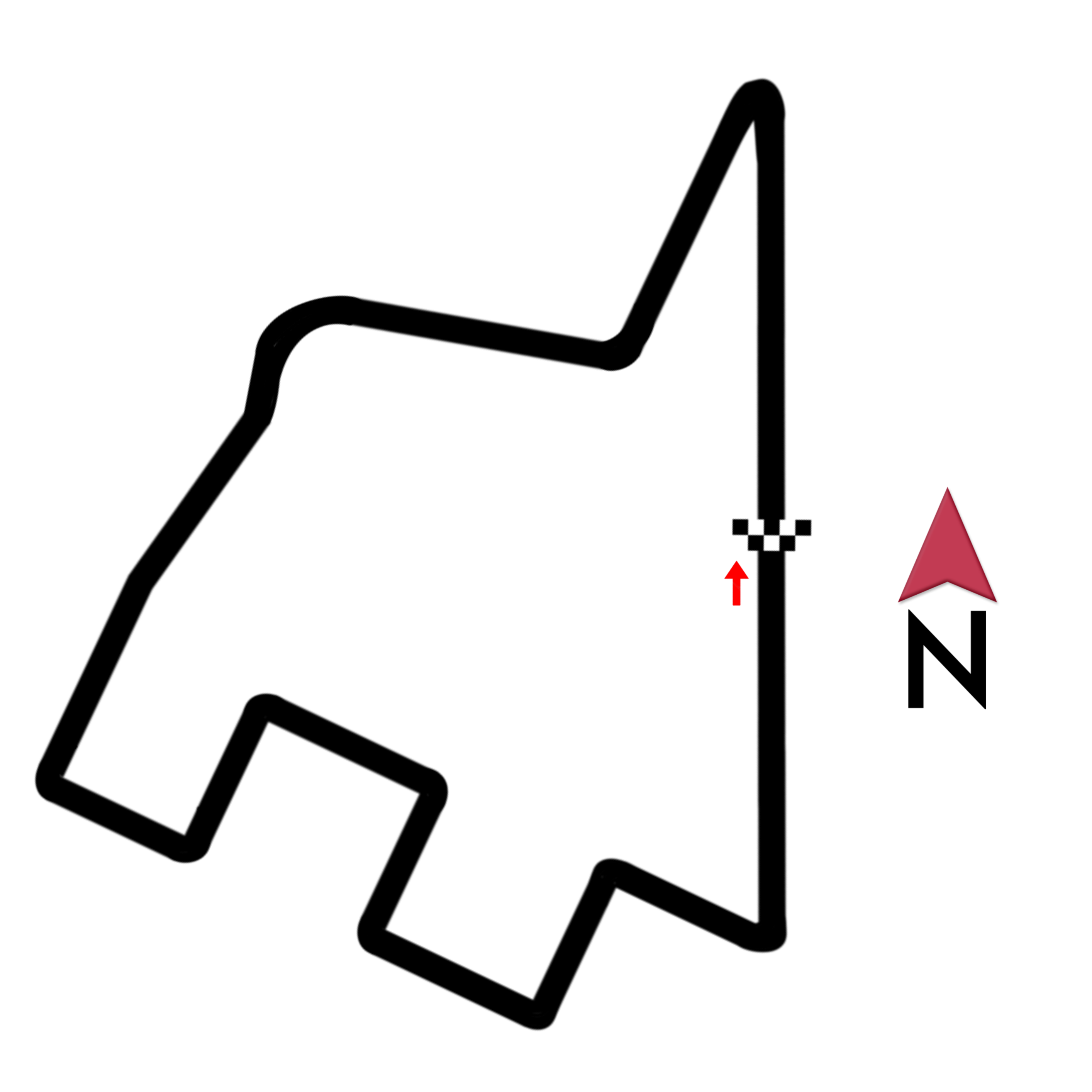
Circuit layout used for the 1997 Ford Los Angeles Grand Prix Vintage Races & Concours.

=== Race Weekend ===
About 25 races were to be scheduled for the 3-day weekend, but according to the L.A. Times, construction issues delayed the event and would ultimately lead to the cancellation of about 10 races. Construction crews rushed to finish the fencing for the track, and practice runs began almost four hours late. It is speculated that over 100,000 people attended the race.

== Stock Car Racing (1998) ==
=== NASCAR Involvement ===
With the 1997 edition consisting of just vintage races, Dr. Burke looked to make next years event even bigger. He would partner with the NASCAR Featherlite Southwest Tour to schedule a stock car event for the weekend. Making it just the second NASCAR sanctioned street race ever held. With the previous race being a NASCAR Winston West event around the Tacoma Dome in 1986 & 1987.

This race would end up being on a different circuit in a different location in Los Angeles, as the race promoters aimed toward the Exposition Park area.

=== Circuit Layout ===
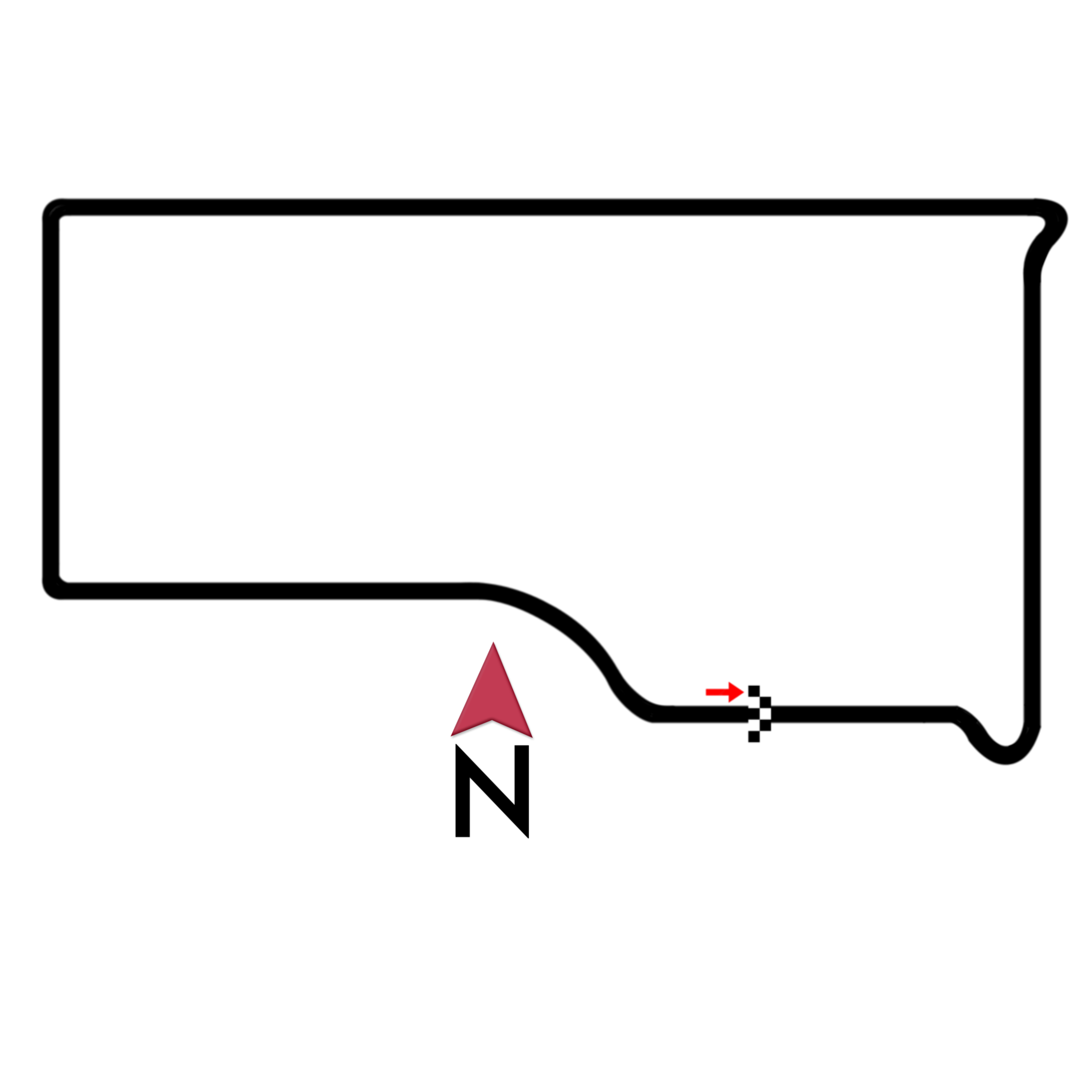
The street course outline used only for the 1998 Ford Los Angeles Street Race weekend.

With the event now taking place around and through Exposition Park, a brand new course layout was introduced. A 1.4 mile (2.2 km) circuit consisting of 6 turns would be utilized, going around the California ScienCenter, Natural History Museum, California African American Museum, and running alongside the L.A. Coliseum and USC.

When the race weekend first started, the backstretch of the track, which was on Exposition Blvd, the Southwest Tour cars would reach up to 140 mph (225 kph), because of that, a chicane had to be placed in order to slow the cars down.

=== Kragen Z-One 200 ===
The event would now be named as the “Ford Los Angeles Street Race”, and it would include support races from the PRO Racing Series, the American City Racing League (ACRL), as well as the Ultra Wheel Spec Truck Series. With the main NASCAR event being officially being named the “Kragen Z-One 200”.

=== Notable Drivers ===
Several NASCAR Winston Cup Series stars would compete in the L.A. Street Race such as; Mark Martin, Ken Schrader, and Chad Little, after all of them would complete in the Winston Cup Series Southern 500 that was held the day before. Also included was former Southwest Tour champion and NASCAR Craftsman Truck Series driver Ron Hornaday Jr.

In addition, several drivers from different motorsport categories would compete in this race such as Boris Said and Willy T. Ribbs. Boris Said even helped design the layout of the track.

And finally, several future NASCAR stars would also participate in the L.A. Street Race, including Kevin Harvick, Kurt Busch, and Matt Crafton.

=== “Baywatch Grand Prix” ===
In the 15th episode of the 9th season of Baywatch, the L.A. Street Race would be featured in the episode. Along with a cameo of Mark Martin, which was described as the racing rival of David Hasselhoff’s character Mitch Buchannon.

The Baywatch filming crew would be on site during the weekend to film the episode, and would show Hasselhoff’s character “driving” the #58 DigitalCity.com Chevrolet, which was actually driven by Steve Anderson. Both the #58 entry & the #40 American Online entry of Damon Lusk would have sponsorship from the show, although Lusk would fail to qualify.

== Layout Change (1999) ==
=== 1999 L.A. Street Race ===
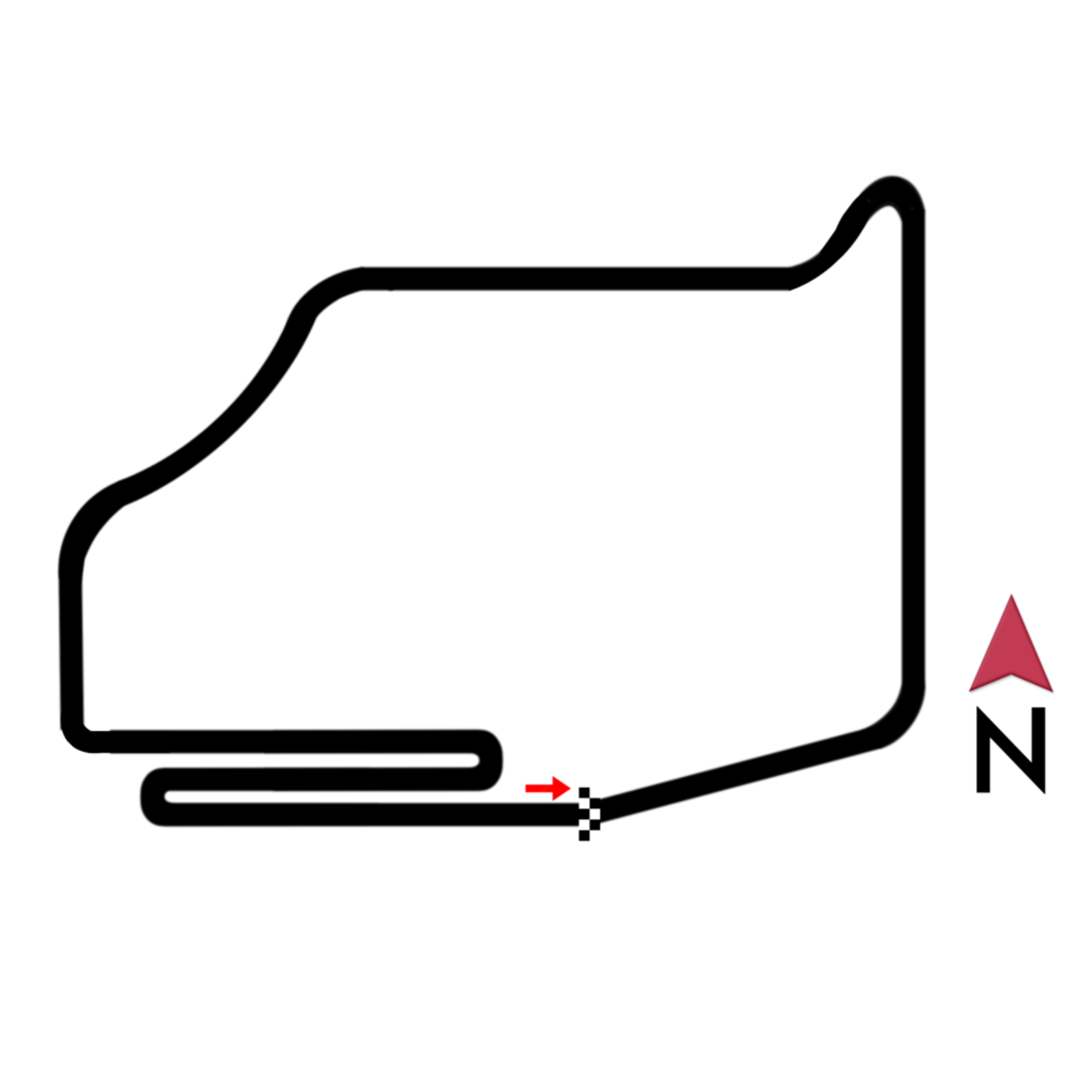
The street course layout for the last two L.A. Street Race events at Exposition Park.

In 1999, the street course layout for the L.A. Street Race was reconfigured, due to complaints about patrons not being able to enter the nearby museums during the race weekend.

The NASCAR Featherlite Southwest Tour, would once again be the headline event, with the race now being called the “Ford Los Angeles Street Race 200”.

=== Weekend Schedule ===
The supporting races would once again include the PRO Racing Series, the Ultra Wheels Spec Truck Series, and some new additions including the American Indycar Series, and even a Ford Ranger EV exhibition.

=== Notable Drivers ===
Ken Schrader and Ron Hornaday Jr. would return for the second edition of the L.A. Street Race, along with future NASCAR stars Kurt Busch, Kevin Harvick, and Matt Crafton.

In addition, a new Cup Series star would join the field, as the late Kenny Irwin Jr. would also compete in this edition of the L.A. Street Race.

Irwin & Schrader also would fly to Los Angeles after competing in the previous days’ Southern 500 Winston Cup Series race.

== Final Running (2000) ==
=== 2000 L.A. Street Race ===
In 2000, the L.A. Street Race would return for the third consecutive year at Exposition Park, and for the first and only time, the street course layout would not change.

However it wouldn’t stay that way for long, as it was planned for the race to move from Exposition Park to a different venue in 2001.

=== Schedule Change ===
In addition, the race weekend in 2000 would move from its traditional Labor Day weekend, to mid-July.

Dr. Burke had two reasons for the date change, which he stated in an L.A. Times article.

First reason, described by Burke, “most people travel over Labor Day and there weren’t many around to come to the race”.

Second reason being that Burke wanted the race to be held an off-weekend for the Winston Cup Series. Said Burke in the L.A. Times article, “We knew how many people watch Winston Cup races on TV, and we also thought we could get some big-name drivers on their off weekend.”

On Saturday July 15, Metallica, along with Korn, System of a Down, Kid Rock, and Powerman 5000, would be at the L.A. Coliseum to perform a concert, as it was part of the Summer Sanitarium Tour in 2000. Even with the concert being held in the middle of the race weekend, it did not interfere with the race, logistics wise.

=== Weekend Schedule ===
In addition to the main NASCAR Southwest Tour event, the Ultra Wheels Spec Truck Series & the PRO Racing Series would return for the 3rd consecutive year, and the event would add the Vintage Cobra Cup to the schedule.

=== Notable Drivers ===
The only notable drivers that would compete in this edition of the L.A. Street Race would be Boris Said, who hadn’t driven in the L.A. Street Race since 1998.

In addition, Matt Crafton would make his 3rd consecutive start in the L.A. Street Race, and in the Spec Trucks Series Race, Parnelli Jones would compete, and would also be the grand marshal for the Southwest Tour race, as well as being the honorary starter.

=== Television Coverage ===
For the first time in the street races’ history, the event would have its race broadcast on television, as NBC’s Los Angeles affiliate station, KNBC-4, would broadcast the main NASCAR event.

The broadcast would include MRN commentators, Mike Bagley and Dan Hubbard, as the play-by-play commentators. The host of the broadcast would be KNBC News sportscaster, Fred Roggin. The pit reporters would be KNBC reporters Patrick Healy & Mike Storms, and another KNBC reporter, Jennifer Bjorklund, would be in the crowd interviewing fans during race.

== Demise of the L.A. Street Race ==
=== Plans for the L.A. Street Races’ Future ===
It was said in an L.A. Times article that Burke had extended the L.A. Street Race contract to run up to 2003, but it would most likely to be held in another complex. The proposed new location was never announced.

=== Sponsorship Loss ===
However, those plans would not come to fruition, as the main sponsor of the L.A. Street Race, which was Ford, would not renew its sponsorship agreement.

Due to this, race organizers were scrambling to try to find a new sponsor for the event, and the race would be held once again in the middle of July, if a sponsor was found. Series director Danny Grill said, “We can always add a race.”

But no sponsor was ever found, thus concluding the run of the L.A. Street Race.
