= Aerlex Fireworks plant explosion =

1985 fireworks explosion in Hallett, Oklahoma

- Date: June 25, 1985
- Time: 9:40 a.m. CST
- Venue: Aerlex Fireworks
- Location: Hallett, Oklahoma; 36°12′28″N 96°32′19″W
- Type: Fireworks explosion
- Cause: Undetermined
- Deaths: 21
- Injuries: 5
- Missing: 0

On June 25, 1985, an explosion occurred at an Aerlex Fireworks plant in Hallett, Oklahoma, killing twenty-one and injuring five others. Those five were the only survivors of the blast. The explosion leveled most of the plant, leaving only a few parts of the factory standing.

The explosion occurred at 9:40 AM CDT, while two workers were unloading a container of highly explosive flash powder. The mixture of potassium perchlorate and powdered aluminum was being illegally transported in a metal container in the rear of a pickup. While unloading the mixture, it is believed the metal-on-metal friction of the container and pickup bed generated a spark that touched off the initial explosion. Due to the close proximity of structures that were being used for fireworks production, the blast instantly spread through the facility. Several of the plant's employees were thrown considerable distances and some were found in a pond located south of the loading dock area. The detonations were heard as far away as Oklahoma City and Tulsa and after the explosion, a large mushroom cloud was visible over the site. The explosion was one of a series of other non-related fireworks accidents that affected other fireworks manufacturers around the same time, including an explosion in Ohio that occurred only 36 days prior. It was the deadliest disaster in Oklahoma during the 1980s.

At the time, the Oklahoma state fire marshal, Fred Rucker, headed the investigation and later stated the initial blast may have occurred where the pickup truck was parked, stating "The initial blast appeared to have been in a smaller building near where the burned-out shell of the truck was found." Investigators focused on the actions of the two workers who were unloading ingredients. However, both men were killed in the primary explosion and five survivors could not add anything to either support or refute the fire marshal's conclusions.

Of the 26 workers who were present at the factory, 21 died in the explosion and five were injured, including factory owner Richard Alan Johnson and employees Richard Aaron O'Bryant, Butch Osbon, Dan Bridges and Jeff Fountain, mayor of Jennings, Oklahoma. Fountain was critically injured suffering third-degree severe burns over a large portion of his body.

Governor George Nigh released a statement, stating "all Oklahoma is grieved by this tragedy," later ordering state flags flown at half-staff through June 30. Nigh also ordered members of the National Guard to assist officials at the site.
