= Fort Collins Downtown Airport =

Airport in Colorado, United States

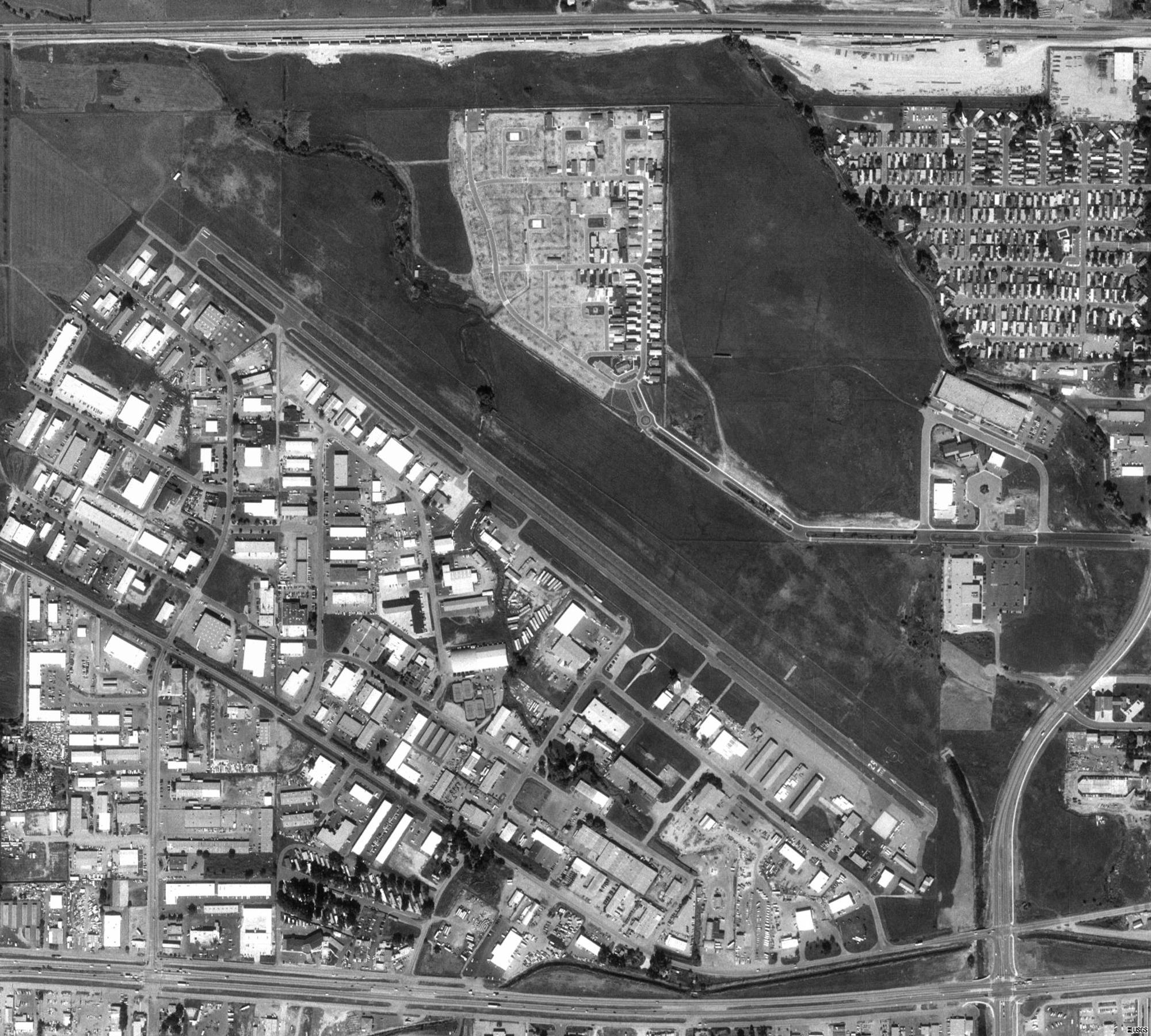
- USGS aerial image, 1999
- IATA: none; ICAO: none; FAA LID: 3V5

Summary
- Airport type: Public
- Serves: Fort Collins, Colorado
- Elevation AMSL: 4,939 ft / 1,505 m
- Coordinates: 40°35′18″N 105°02′30″W
- Interactive map of Fort Collins Downtown Airport

Runways
Direction	Length		Surface
Direction	ft	m	Surface
11/29	5,326	1,623	Asphalt
E/W	3,400	1,036	Turf

Statistics (2006)
- Aircraft operations: 48/day
- Based aircraft: 126

Fort Collins Downtown Airport (FAA LID: 3V5) was a public use airport located 2 nautical miles (3.7 km; 2.3 mi) east of the central business district of Fort Collins, a city in Larimer County, Colorado, United States. The airport closed on November 1, 2006.

== History ==
The airport opened in 1966 and was known as Valley Airport. Sometime before 1976 it was renamed Fort Collins Airpark and the following year it was named Downtown Fort Collins Airport. It was located northwest of the intersection of East Mulberry and South Timberline Roads.

== Facilities and aircraft ==
Fort Collins Downtown Airport was situated at an elevation of 4,939 feet (1,505 m) above mean sea level. It had one asphalt paved runway designated 11/29 which measured 5,326 by 44 feet (1,623 x 13 m). It also has a turf runway designated E/W which measured 3400 by 50 feet (1,036 x 15 m).

The airport had an average of 48 aircraft operations per day: 100% general aviation and <1% military aviation. There were 126 aircraft based at this airport: 90 single-engine, 20 multi-engine, 15 helicopters, and 1 glider.
