= Hoffpauir =

Hoffpauir is a surname. Notable people with the surname include:

- Dylon Hoffpauir, American cheerleader and dancer
- Jarrett Hoffpauir (born 1983), American baseball player, distant cousin of Micah
- Micah Hoffpauir (born 1980), American baseball player

== See also ==
- Hoffpauir Airport, an airport in Harris County, Texas, United States
