= Hallett, Oklahoma =

- Town
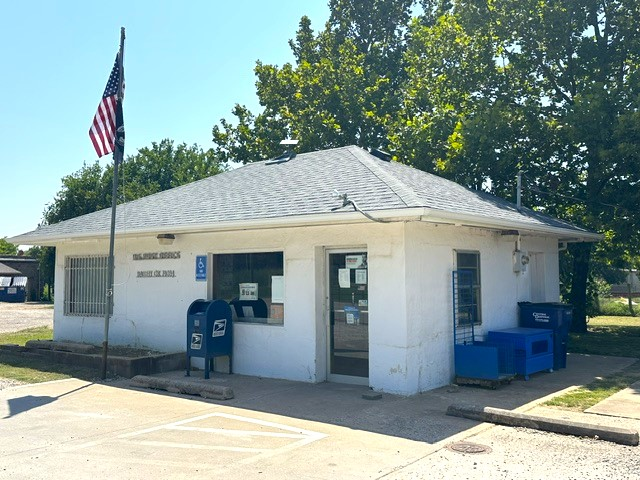
- Hallett Post Office in July of 2026

- Location of Hallett, Oklahoma
- Coordinates: 36°13′55″N 96°34′04″W
- Country: United States
- State: Oklahoma
- County: Pawnee

Area
  - Total: 0.92 sq mi (2.38 km^{2})
  - Land: 0.92 sq mi (2.38 km^{2})
  - Water: 0 sq mi (0.00 km^{2})
- Elevation: 922 ft (281 m)

Population (2020)
  - Total: 105
  - Density: 114.1/sq mi (44.07/km^{2})
- Time zone: UTC-6 (Central (CST))
  - Summer (DST): UTC-5 (CDT)
- ZIP code: 74034
- Area codes: 539/918
- FIPS code: 40-32050
- GNIS feature ID: 2412720

Hallett is a town in Pawnee County, Oklahoma, United States. It is located 19 miles southeast of Pawnee, the county seat of Pawnee County, on State Highway 99, slightly north of U.S. Highway 412. The population was 105 as of the 2020 Census.

== History ==
The town of Hallett was founded on December 8, 1904, at the junction of the Arkansas Valley and Western Railway (later the St. Louis and San Francisco Railway) and the Missouri, Kansas and Oklahoma Railroad (later the Missouri, Kansas and Texas Railway). The developer, Hallett Townsite Company, was named for Charles H. Hallett, an officer in the Nineteenth Kansas Cavalry. A post office was established in the town on May 19, 1905, and the first newspaper, the weekly Hallett Herald was published.

Hallett became a trade center for the local agriculture industry. The discovery of Hallett oil field brought a brief boom in 1908 and again in the 1920s. Population peaked at 279 in 1920, then declined to a low of 120 in 1950.

An explosion at the Aerlex Fireworks plant killed 21 people on June 25, 1985.

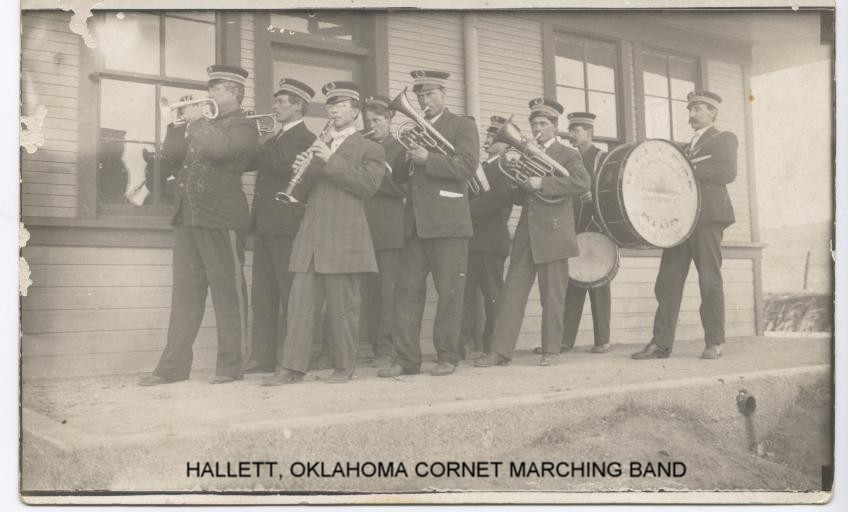
Hallett, Oklahoma

== Geography ==
According to the United States Census Bureau, the town has a total area of 0.9 square miles (2.3 km^{2}), all land. It is approximately 19 miles (31 km) southeast of the city of Pawnee.

== Demographics ==
Historical population
Census	Pop.	Note	%±
1910	147		—
1920	279		89.8%
1930	176		−36.9%
1940	159		−9.7%
1950	120		−24.5%
1960	132		10.0%
1970	125		−5.3%
1980	186		48.8%
1990	159		−14.5%
2000	168		5.7%
2010	125		−25.6%
2020	105		−16.0%
U.S. Decennial Census

=== 2020 census ===
As of the 2020 census, Hallett had a population of 105. The median age was 51.9 years. 17.1% of residents were under the age of 18 and 26.7% of residents were 65 years of age or older. For every 100 females there were 105.9 males, and for every 100 females age 18 and over there were 107.1 males age 18 and over.

0.0% of residents lived in urban areas, while 100.0% lived in rural areas.

There were 50 households in Hallett, of which 30.0% had children under the age of 18 living in them. Of all households, 48.0% were married-couple households, 24.0% were households with a male householder and no spouse or partner present, and 22.0% were households with a female householder and no spouse or partner present. About 32.0% of all households were made up of individuals and 12.0% had someone living alone who was 65 years of age or older.

There were 57 housing units, of which 12.3% were vacant. The homeowner vacancy rate was 0.0% and the rental vacancy rate was 0.0%.

Racial composition as of the 2020 census
Race	Number	Percent
White	96	91.4%
Black or African American	0	0.0%
American Indian and Alaska Native	5	4.8%
Asian	0	0.0%
Native Hawaiian and Other Pacific Islander	0	0.0%
Some other race	2	1.9%
Two or more races	2	1.9%
Hispanic or Latino (of any race)	6	5.7%

=== 2000 census ===
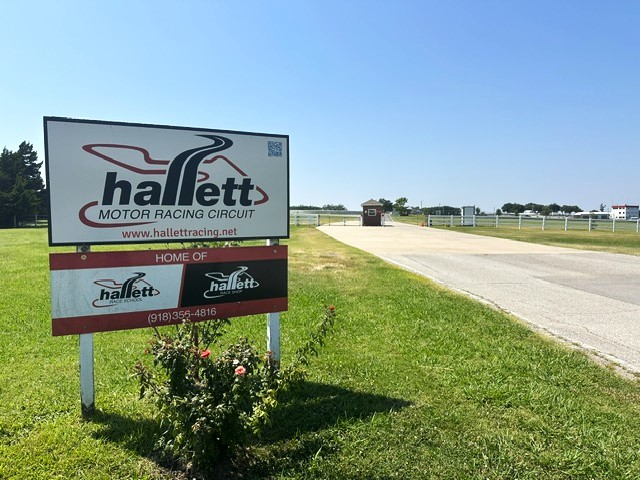
Hallett Motor Racing Circuit entrance just south of town, 7-2026

As of the census of 2000, there were 168 people, 58 households, and 46 families residing in the town. The population density was 192.4 inhabitants per square mile (74.3/km^{2}). There were 68 housing units at an average density of 77.9 per square mile (30.1/km^{2}). The racial makeup of the town was 79.17% White, 8.33% Native American, and 12.50% from two or more races. Hispanic or Latino of any race were 1.79% of the population.

There were 58 households, out of which 29.3% had children under the age of 18 living with them, 63.8% were married couples living together, 10.3% had a female householder with no husband present, and 19.0% were non-families. 13.8% of all households were made up of individuals, and 6.9% had someone living alone who was 65 years of age or older. The average household size was 2.90 and the average family size was 3.23.

In the town, the population was spread out, with 32.1% under the age of 18, 8.9% from 18 to 24, 24.4% from 25 to 44, 20.2% from 45 to 64, and 14.3% who were 65 years of age or older. The median age was 33 years. For every 100 females, there were 88.8 males. For every 100 females age 18 and over, there were 93.2 males.

The median income for a household in the town was $30,000, and the median income for a family was $30,250. Males had a median income of $41,250 versus $51,250 for females. The per capita income for the town was $12,539. About 15.6% of families and 14.1% of the population were below the poverty line, including 18.8% of those under the age of eighteen and 23.5% of those 65 or over.

== Education ==
It is in the Cleveland Public Schools school district.
