= Colorado National Speedway =

Racetrack in Dacono, Colorado, US

CNS
- Location: 4281 Speedway Boulevard; Dacono, Colorado, United States
- Coordinates: 40°3′34.85″N 104°58′27.71″W
- Opened: 1965
- Major events: Current: ARCA Menards Series West; Legendary Billy Green 150 (1995–1996, 2001, 2004, 2007–2021, 2025–present); Former: NASCAR Craftsman Truck Series; Colorado 250 (1995–1997); NASCAR Southwest Series (1992–2006); NASCAR Midwest Series (1999–2006)
- Website: https://www.coloradospeedway.com/

Oval (1965–present)
- Surface: Asphalt
- Length: 0.375 mi (0.604 km)
- Turns: 4
- Race lap record: 0:17.173 ( (United States) Trevor Huddleston, Ford Fusion NASCAR, 2025, ARCA Menards)

Colorado National Speedway is a 0.375 mi (0.604 km) paved oval in Dacono, Colorado, United States. The track is currently a member of the NASCAR Advance Auto Parts Weekly Series and hosts the ARCA Menards Series West (former NASCAR K&N Pro Series West), the King of the Wing Sprint Car Series, and the North American Big Rig Racing Series annually.

== History ==
Founded in 1965 by Gene and Gerda Heffley, Colorado National Speedway sits at the foot of the Rocky Mountains at exit 232 off of I-25. CNS hosts a variety of local racing, along with several national touring series, car and motorcycle shows, swap meets, and an annual Father's Day Sunday Super Show featuring Monster Trucks, Stunt Bikes, and more. The Speedway opens for practice in April, racing begins in May, and events run through October. CNS is known locally for concessions, affordable tickets, and fireworks displays on holidays and special race events.

CNS hosted the NASCAR Craftsman Truck Series during its first three seasons, 1995 through 1997. The 1995 Total Petroleum 200 featured a last lap battle where Butch Miller edged out Mike Skinner by 0.001 second for his only series win. This is listed as the closest finish in series history, although the video replay of the race may dispute that measurement. The 1996 Colorado 200 saw Skinner dominate leading the final 220 laps and beat Miller by .7 seconds. Ron Hornaday Jr. won the final race in 1997.

For the 1998 season, Colorado was dropped from the schedule in favor of Pikes Peak International Raceway in Colorado Springs, which hosted the series until 2002.

The ARCA Menards Series West has raced at Colorado numerous times. Chris Eggleston holds the most-series wins at the track with three.

In 2019, the track was repaved.

NASCAR Midwest Series ran nine races at the speedway from 1999 through 2006, and NASCAR Southwest Series hosted 20 events at the track between 1992 and 2006.
