= Dacono, Colorado =

City in Colorado, US

- Home rule city
- City of Dacono
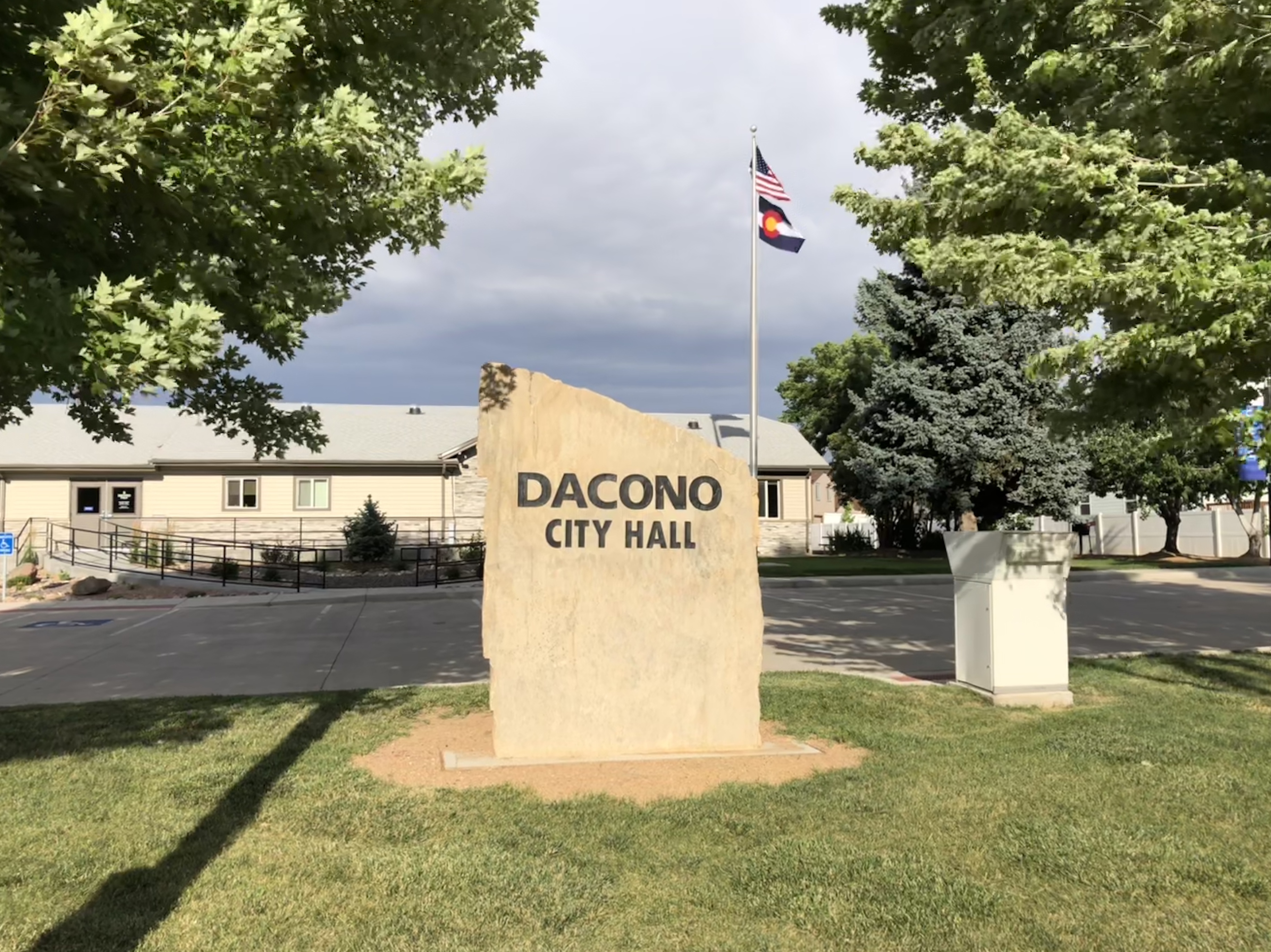
- The Dacono City Hall

- Coordinates: 40°03′44″N 104°56′49″W
- Country: United States
- State: Colorado
- County: Weld
- Settled: 1901
- Incorporated: September 23, 1908

Government
  - Type: Home rule city

Area
  - Total: 8.796 sq mi (22.782 km^{2})
  - Land: 8.790 sq mi (22.766 km^{2})
  - Water: 0.0062 sq mi (0.016 km^{2})
- Elevation: 5,112 ft (1,558 m)

Population (2020)
  - Total: 6,297
  - Density: 716/sq mi (276/km^{2})
- Time zone: UTC−07:00 (MST)
  - Summer (DST): UTC−06:00 (MDT)
- ZIP code: 80514
- Area codes: 303/720/983
- GNIS city ID: 2410283
- FIPS code: 08-19080
- Website: www.daconoco.gov

Dacono is a home rule city located in southwestern Weld County, Colorado, United States. The city population was 6,297 at the 2020 United States census, an increase of +51.66% since the 2010 United States census. Dacono is a part of the Greeley, CO Metropolitan Statistical Area and the Front Range Urban Corridor.

== History ==
The city name's is an amalgamation of the names of Daisy Baum, Cora Van Vorhies, and Nora Brooks, wives of local coal mine operators. Dacono was first settled in 1901, and early settlers moved there to work in the coal mines. The Dacono, Colorado, post office opened on December 21, 1907, and the Town of Dacono was incorporated on September 23, 1908.

== Geography ==
At the 2020 United States census, the town had a total area of 5,630 acres (22.782 km^{2}) including 4 acres (0.016 km^{2}) of water.

== Demographics ==
Historical population
Census	Pop.	Note	%±
1910	180		—
1920	172		−4.4%
1930	275		59.9%
1940	296		7.6%
1950	258		−12.8%
1960	302		17.1%
1970	360		19.2%
1980	2,321		544.7%
1990	2,228		−4.0%
2000	3,015		35.3%
2010	4,152		37.7%
2020	6,297		51.7%
2023 (est.)	6,595	▲	4.7%
U.S. Decennial Census

=== 2020 census ===
As of the 2020 census, Dacono had a population of 6,297. The median age was 34.2 years. 27.4% of residents were under the age of 18 and 10.1% of residents were 65 years of age or older. For every 100 females there were 102.9 males, and for every 100 females age 18 and over there were 104.6 males age 18 and over.

72.5% of residents lived in urban areas, while 27.5% lived in rural areas.

There were 2,115 households in Dacono, of which 41.7% had children under the age of 18 living in them. Of all households, 57.4% were married-couple households, 17.3% were households with a male householder and no spouse or partner present, and 18.1% were households with a female householder and no spouse or partner present. About 16.8% of all households were made up of individuals and 6.1% had someone living alone who was 65 years of age or older.

There were 2,156 housing units, of which 1.9% were vacant. The homeowner vacancy rate was 0.5% and the rental vacancy rate was 3.8%.

Racial composition as of the 2020 census
Race	Number	Percent
White	4,124	65.5%
Black or African American	65	1.0%
American Indian and Alaska Native	104	1.7%
Asian	183	2.9%
Native Hawaiian and Other Pacific Islander	8	0.1%
Some other race	865	13.7%
Two or more races	948	15.1%
Hispanic or Latino (of any race)	2,187	34.7%

=== 2000 census ===
As of the census of 2000, there were 3,015 people, 1,087 households, and 756 families residing in the city. The population density was 1,103.0 inhabitants per square mile (425.9/km^{2}). There were 1,136 housing units at an average density of 415.6 per square mile (160.5/km^{2}). The racial makeup of the city was 77.05% White, 0.43% African American, 0.96% Native American, 1.00% Asian, 17.98% from other races, and 2.59% from two or more races. Hispanic or Latino people of any race were 32.04% of the population.

There were 1,087 households, out of which 34.6% had children under the age of 18 living with them, 55.3% were married couples living together, 9.3% had a female householder with no husband present, and 30.4% were non-families. 23.6% of all households were made up of individuals, and 7.6% had someone living alone who was 65 years of age or older. The average household size was 2.77 and the average family size was 3.32.

In the city, the population was spread out, with 29.2% under the age of 18, 7.9% from 18 to 24, 32.4% from 25 to 44, 21.2% from 45 to 64, and 9.3% who were 65 years of age or older. The median age was 33 years. For every 100 females, there were 100.2 males. For every 100 females age 18 and over, there were 99.3 males.

The median income for a household in the city was $38,854, and the median income for a family was $42,659. Males had a median income of $29,899 versus $25,000 for females. The per capita income for the city was $15,368. About 3.6% of families and 6.0% of the population were below the poverty line, including 6.5% of those under age 18 and 6.4% of those age 65 or over.

== Points of interest ==
Dacono is home to the Colorado National Speedway, s short oval racetrack opened in 1965. It currently hosts an annual ARCA Menards Series West stock car race, as well as local weekly races. The NASCAR Truck Series visited the track from 1995 to 1997.

== See also ==
- Greeley, CO Metropolitan Statistical Area
- Denver-Aurora-Greeley, CO Combined Statistical Area
- Front Range Urban Corridor
