= Kevin Whitesides =

American racing driver (born 1964)

- Nationality: (United States) American
- Born: May 1, 1964 (age 62) Columbia, Missouri, U.S.

Formula Super Vee
- Best finish: 22nd in 1985

Kevin Whitesides (born May 1, 1964) is an American race car driver who competed in the Formula Super Vee and attempted rookie orientation for the 1989 Indianapolis 500. In the 1985 Super Vee season, he finished 23rd in points, with a high finish of fifth at Indianapolis Raceway Park.

== Racing record ==
=== SCCA National Championship Runoffs ===
Year	Track	Car	Engine	Class	Finish	Start	Status
1982	Road Atlanta	Lola T620	Volkswagen	C Sports Racer	6		Retired
1983	Road Atlanta	Van Diemen RF83	Ford	Formula Continental	9	12	Running
1983	Road Atlanta	Lola T620	Volkswagen	C Sports Racer	4	8	Running
1984	Road Atlanta	Ralt RT5	Volkswagen	Formula Continental	9	5	Running
1985	Road Atlanta	Ralt RT5	Volkswagen	Formula Continental	8	10	Running
1986	Road Atlanta	Swift DB2	Ford	Sports 2000	24	1	Retired
1987	Road Atlanta	Swift DB2	Ford	Sports 2000	1	1	Running
