= Street circuit =

Motorsport track composed of public city streets

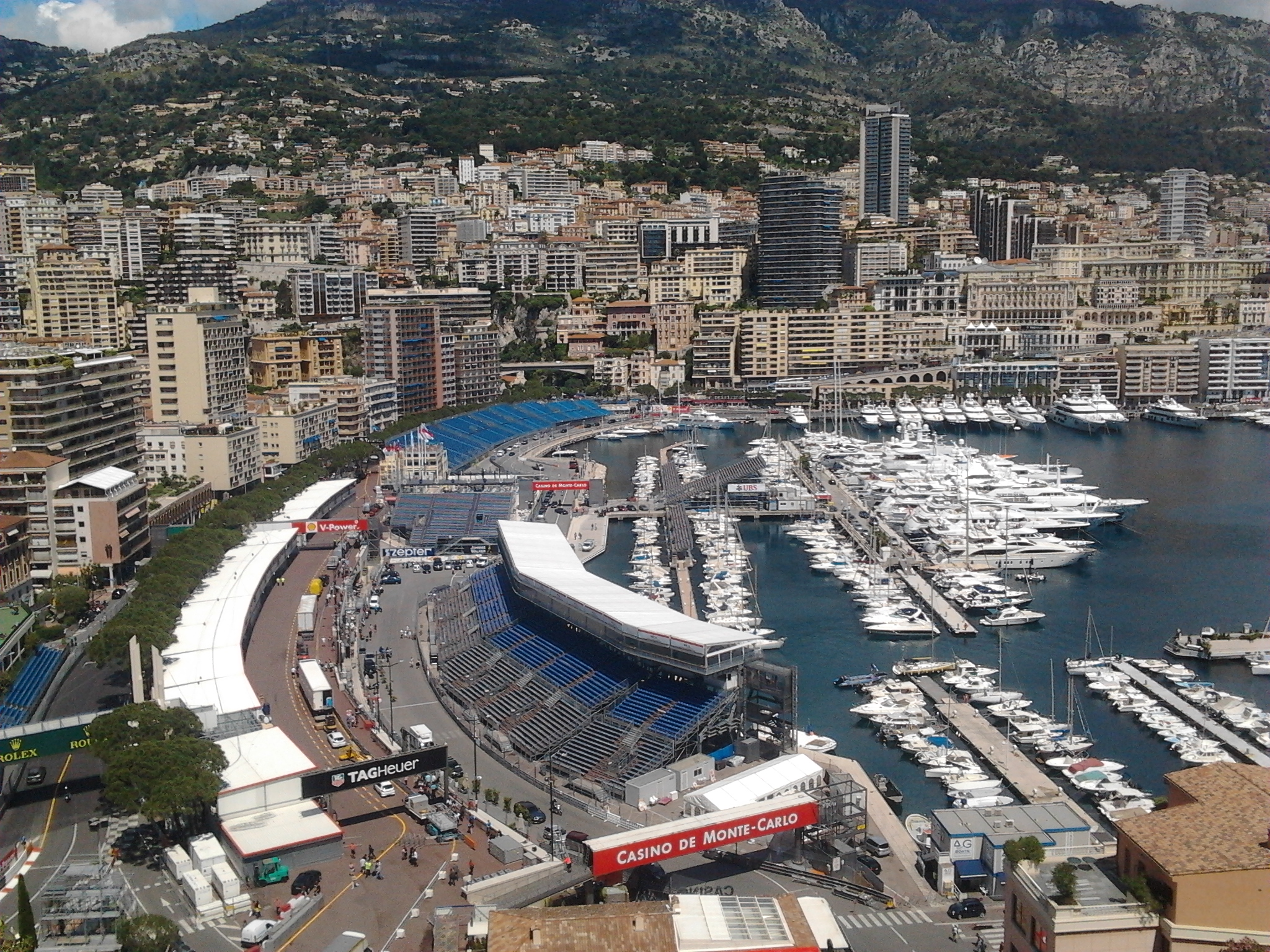
The Monaco Grand Prix, held at the Circuit de Monaco, is one of the world's most prestigious and famous auto races.

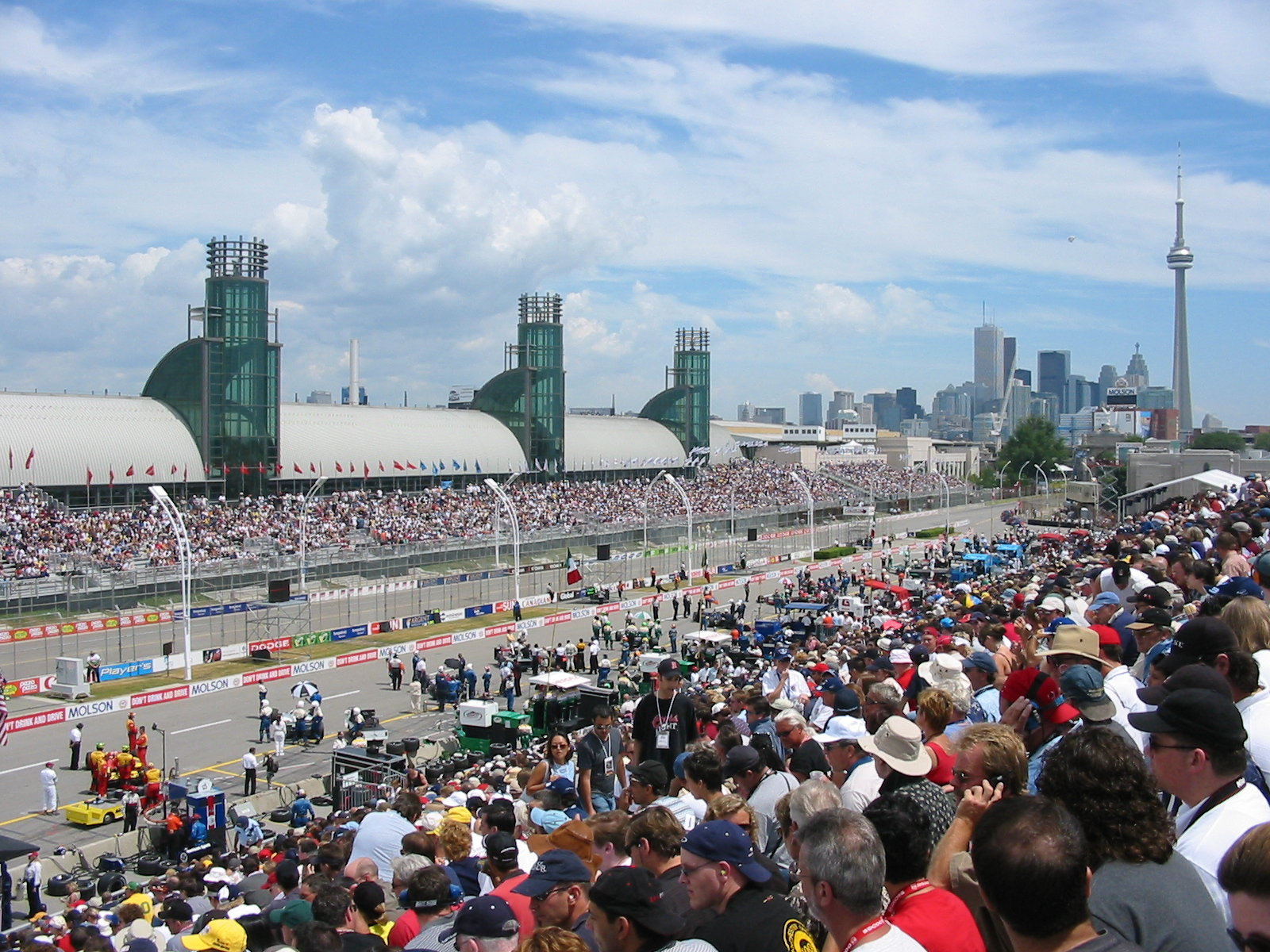
The Toronto Indy street circuit was run at Toronto's Exhibition Place from 1986 to 2025.

A street circuit is a motorsport racing circuit composed of temporarily closed-off public roads of a city, town or village, used in motor races. Airport runways and taxiways are also sometimes part of street circuits. Facilities such as the paddock, pit boxes, fences and grandstands are usually installed temporarily and removed soon after the race is over but in modern times the pits, garages, race control and main grandstands are sometimes permanently constructed in the area. Since the track surface is originally planned for normal speeds, race drivers often find street circuits bumpy and lacking grip. Run-off areas may be non-existent, which makes driving mistakes more expensive than in purpose-built circuits with wider run-off areas. Racing on a street circuit is also called "legal street racing".

Local governments sometimes support races held in street circuits to promote tourism. In some cases, short segments or connector roads of the circuit are purpose-built for the racecourse, and remain in place year-round, but are not otherwise utilized by public traffic.

== List of street circuits ==
active circuits in bold

=== Americas ===
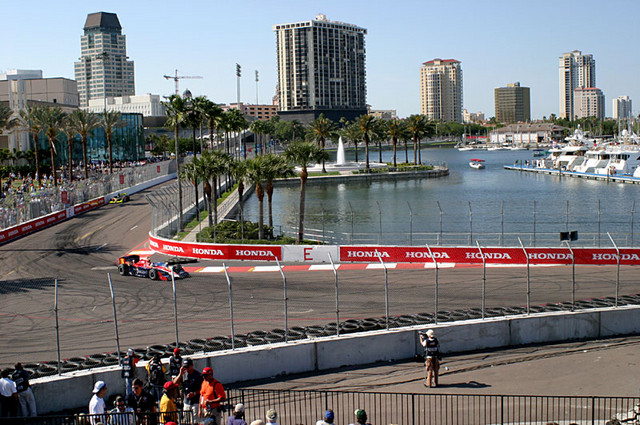
The St. Petersburg street circuit held its first race in 1985, and was integrated into the IndyCar Series in 2003.

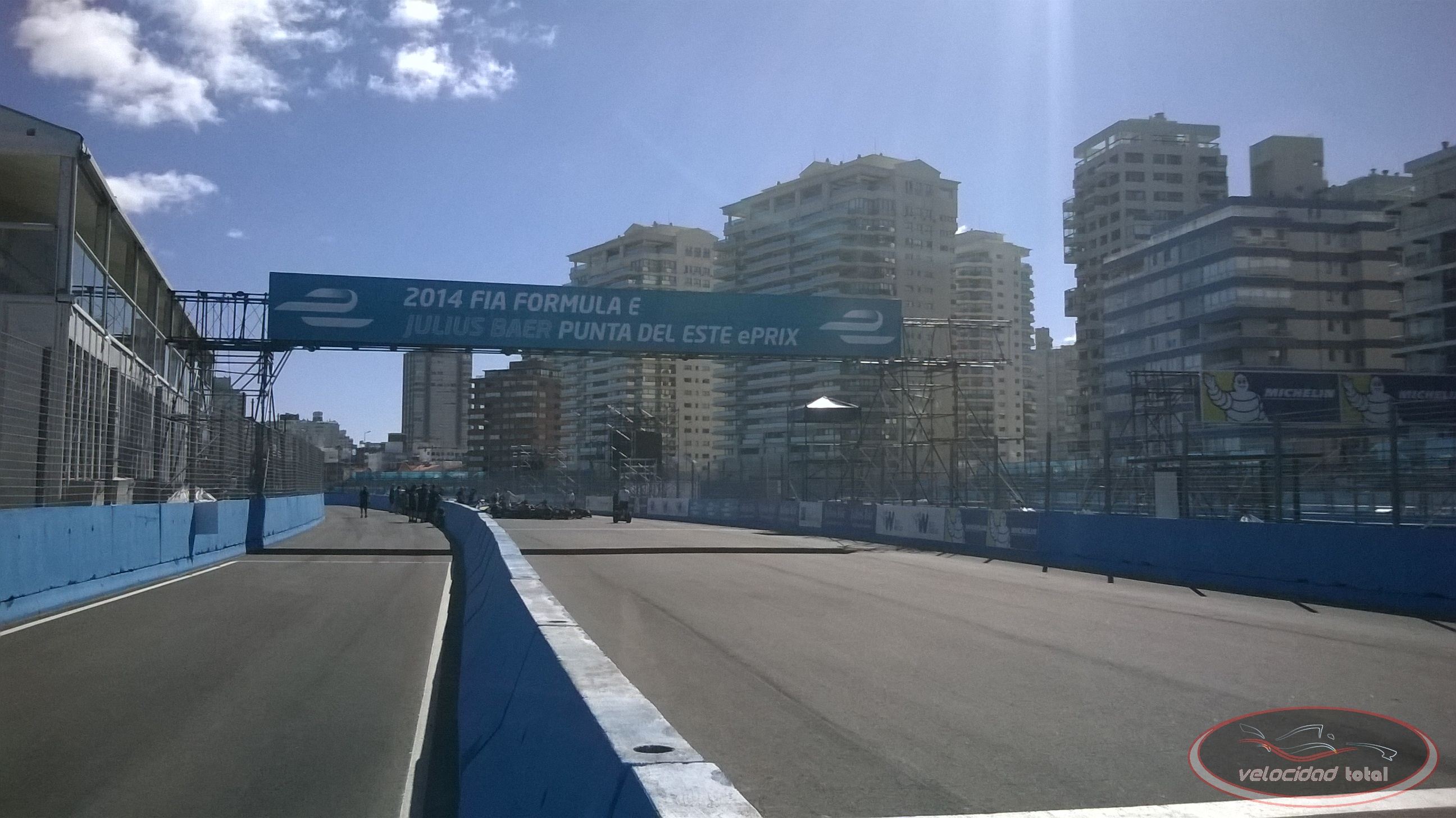
Punta del Este Street Circuit, Uruguay was the first ePrix of Formula E in the Americas. It ran along Punta del Este's harbour – nicknamed the Monte Carlo of South America.

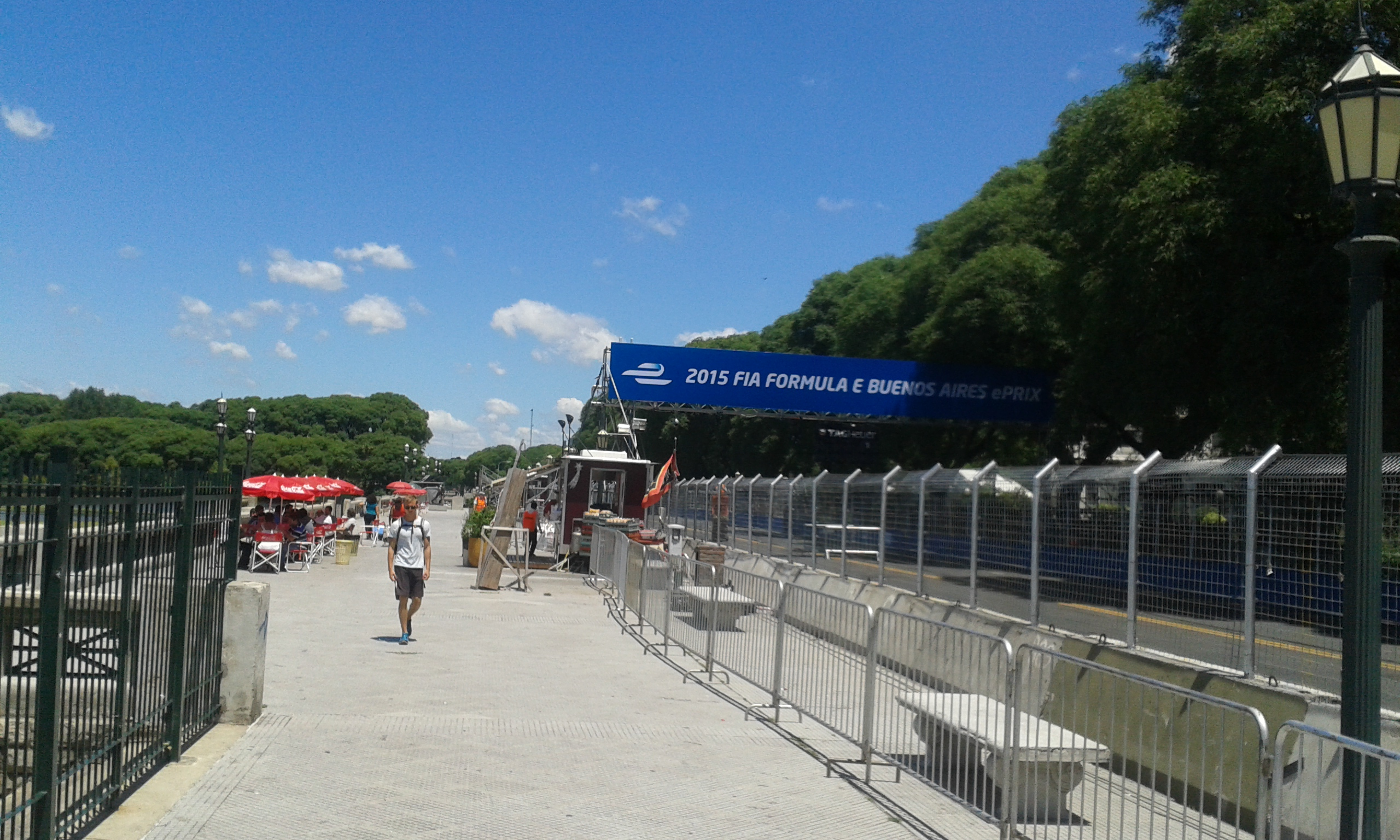
Puerto Madero Street Circuit, Argentina, alongside a typical food stand in the Costanera Sur

- **Arlington**, Texas, USA (IndyCar)
- Baltimore, Maryland, USA (IndyCar, ALMS)
- Brooklyn, New York, USA (Formula E)
- Buenos Aires Puerto Madero, Argentina (Formula E)
- Buenos Aires TC2000, Argentina (TC2000)
- Carrera Panamericana, Mexico (WSC)
- Crown Point Road Race Circuit, Crown Point, Indiana
- Chicago Street Course, Illinois, USA (NASCAR)
- Dallas, Texas, USA (F1)
- Denver, Colorado, USA (CART)
- Detroit Belle Isle Park, Michigan, USA (CART, IndyCar, ALMS)
- **Detroit Renaissance Center**, Michigan, USA (F1, CART, IndyCar)
- Halifax, Canada (British F2, IMSA)
- Houston, Texas, USA (CART, IndyCar, ALMS)
- Las Vegas, Nevada, USA (CART)
- **Las Vegas,** Nevada, USA (F1)
- **Long Beach**, California, USA (F1, CART, IndyCar, ALMS, SCC, Formula E)
- Los Angeles, California, USA (NASCAR Southwest Series)
- Miami Bayfront Park, Florida, USA (CART, IMSA, ALMS)
- Miami Bicentennial Park, Florida, USA (CART, IMSA)
- Miami Biscayne Bay, Florida, USA (Formula E)
- Miami Tamiami Park, Florida, USA (CART, IMSA)
- Monterrey, Mexico (CART, A1 GP)
- Montreal, Canada (Formula E)
- Montevideo, Uruguay (Top Race, AUVo)
- Nashville, Tennessee, USA (IndyCar)
- Naval Base Coronado, San Diego, USA (NASCAR)
- **Pittsburgh**, Pennsylvania, USA (SCCA)
- Phoenix, Arizona, USA (F1)
- Piriápolis, Uruguay (F3 Sudamericana, AUVo)
- Potrero de los Funes, Argentina (TC 2000, Turismo Carretera, FIA GT)
- Punta del Este, Uruguay (TC 2000, AUVo, Formula E)
- Ribeirão Preto, Brazil (Brazilian Stock Car)
- Salvador, Brazil (Brazilian Stock Car)
- San Jose, California, USA (CART)
- Santa Fe, Argentina (TC 2000, F3 Sudamericana)
- Santiago Parque Forestal, Chile (Formula E)
- Santiago Parque O'Higgins, Chile (Formula E)
- **São Paulo**, Brazil (IndyCar, Formula E)
- **St. Petersburg**, Florida, USA (CART, IndyCar, ALMS)
- **Toronto**, Canada (CART, IndyCar)
- **Trois-Rivières**, Canada (ALMS, Grand-Am, NASCAR)
- Vancouver, Canada (CART, Formula E)
- **Washington, D.C.**, USA (IndyCar)

=== Asia ===
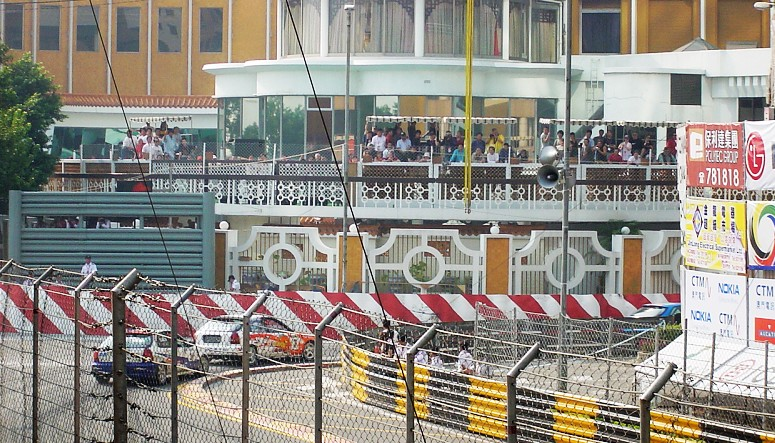
Guia Circuit, host of both the Macau Grand Prix and the TCR World Tour's Macau Guia Race.

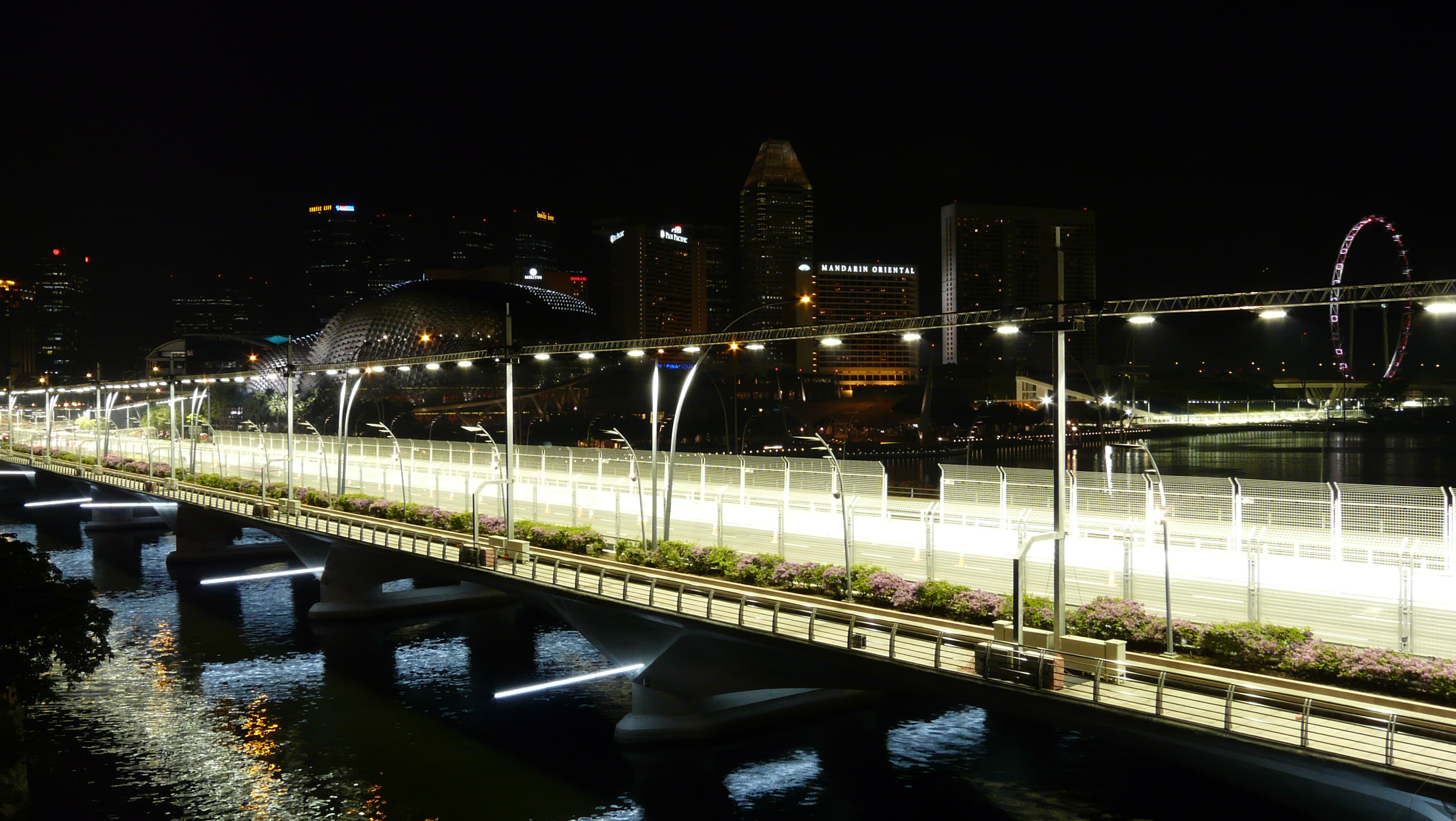
Marina Bay Street Circuit, Singapore, currently used in Formula 1

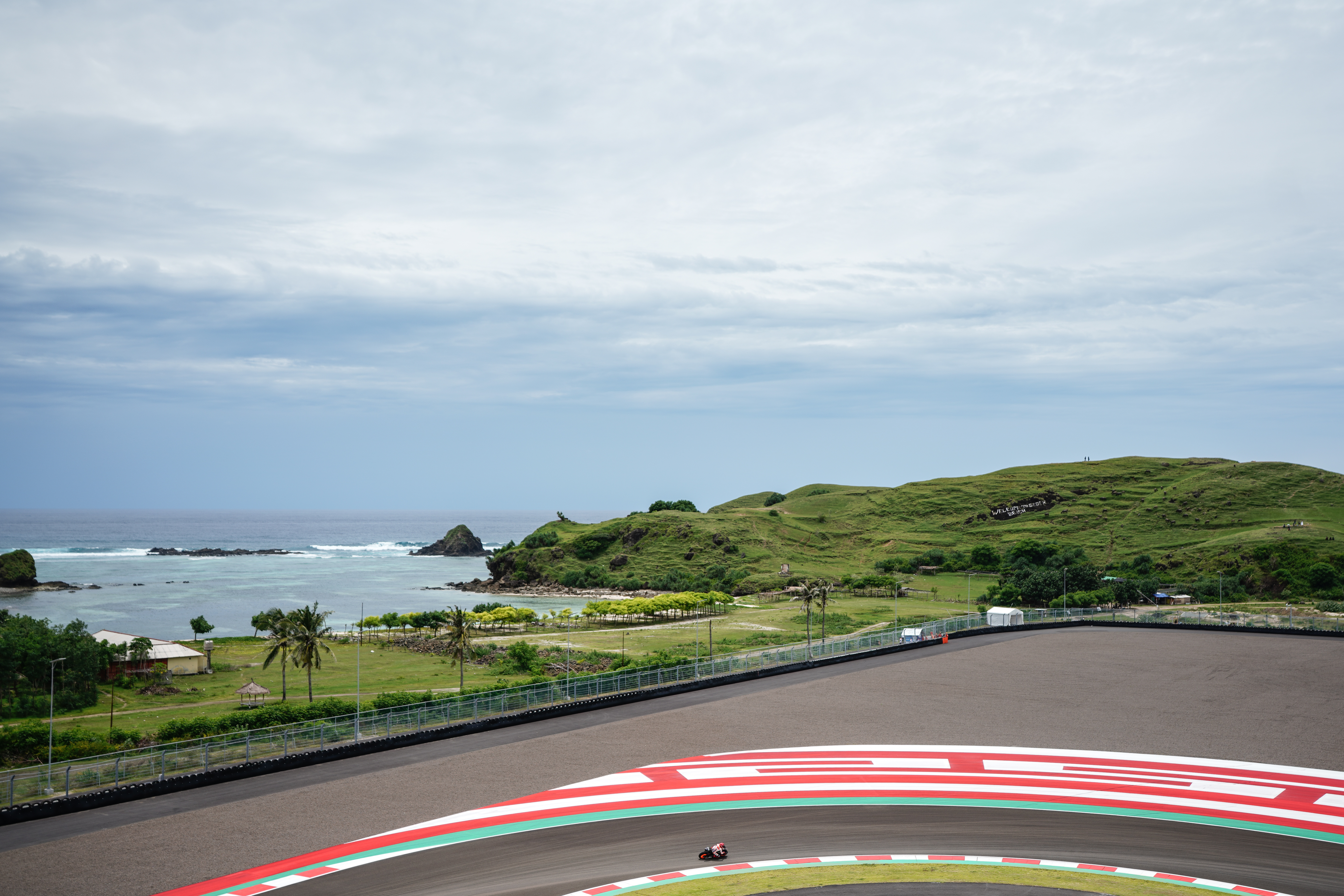
Marc Márquez rounds turn 10 of Mandalika International Street Circuit during the MotoGP pre-season test, February 2022

- Bangsaen, Thailand (Bangsaen Grand Prix)
- Beijing Jingkai, China (A1GP)
- Beijing Olympic Green, China (Formula E)
- Beijing SC, China (Superleague Formula)
- Changwon, South Korea (F3)
- **Chennai**, Tamil Nadu, India (F4)
- Hong Kong Central, Hong Kong (Formula E)
- Hyderabad, India (Formula E)
- **Jakarta**, Indonesia (Formula E)
- **Jeddah**, Saudi Arabia (F1, F2, Formula E)
- Kuala Lumpur, Malaysia (V8 Supercars)
- **Macau Guia**, Macau (Macau Grand Prix: F3, GT3, WTCR, Superbike)
- Malacca, Malaysia
- **Mandalika** (Note: Mandalika is not a street circuit as defined in the Wikipedia article; the name was created by the Indonesian government, which owns and has developed the circuit from scrubland. See Talk:Mandalika International Street Circuit#Street circuit. The conceptual differences with other street circuits (such as Monaco or Singapore) include: • It's not just any ordinary highway that's been transformed: Mandalika is a permanent circuit built specifically for racing, rather than using closed public roads. • Supporting road access (inner and outer roads): Roads outside the main race track (6–8 meters wide) are designed to be open to the public as connecting roads to the area or used for sports activities such as morning walks and cycling when there are no racing events. • Tourism integration goal: Built within The Mandalika area, the circuit is surrounded by planned hotels, commercial areas and resort facilities so that the track is designed to blend in with the tourism city layout.), Indonesia (MotoGP, Superbike)
- **Marina Bay**, Singapore (F1)
- Riyadh, Saudi Arabia (Formula E)
- Putrajaya, Malaysia (Formula E)
- Sanya, China (Formula E)
- Seoul Street Circuit, South Korea (Formula E)
- Seremban, Malaysia
- Shanghai, China (DTM)
- SPICE, Penang, Malaysia
- Tangerang, Indonesia (A1GP)
- Thomson Road, Singapore
- **Tokyo**, Japan (Formula E)
- Wuhan, China (WTCR)
- Zhuhai, China (BPR GT)

=== Europe and Africa ===
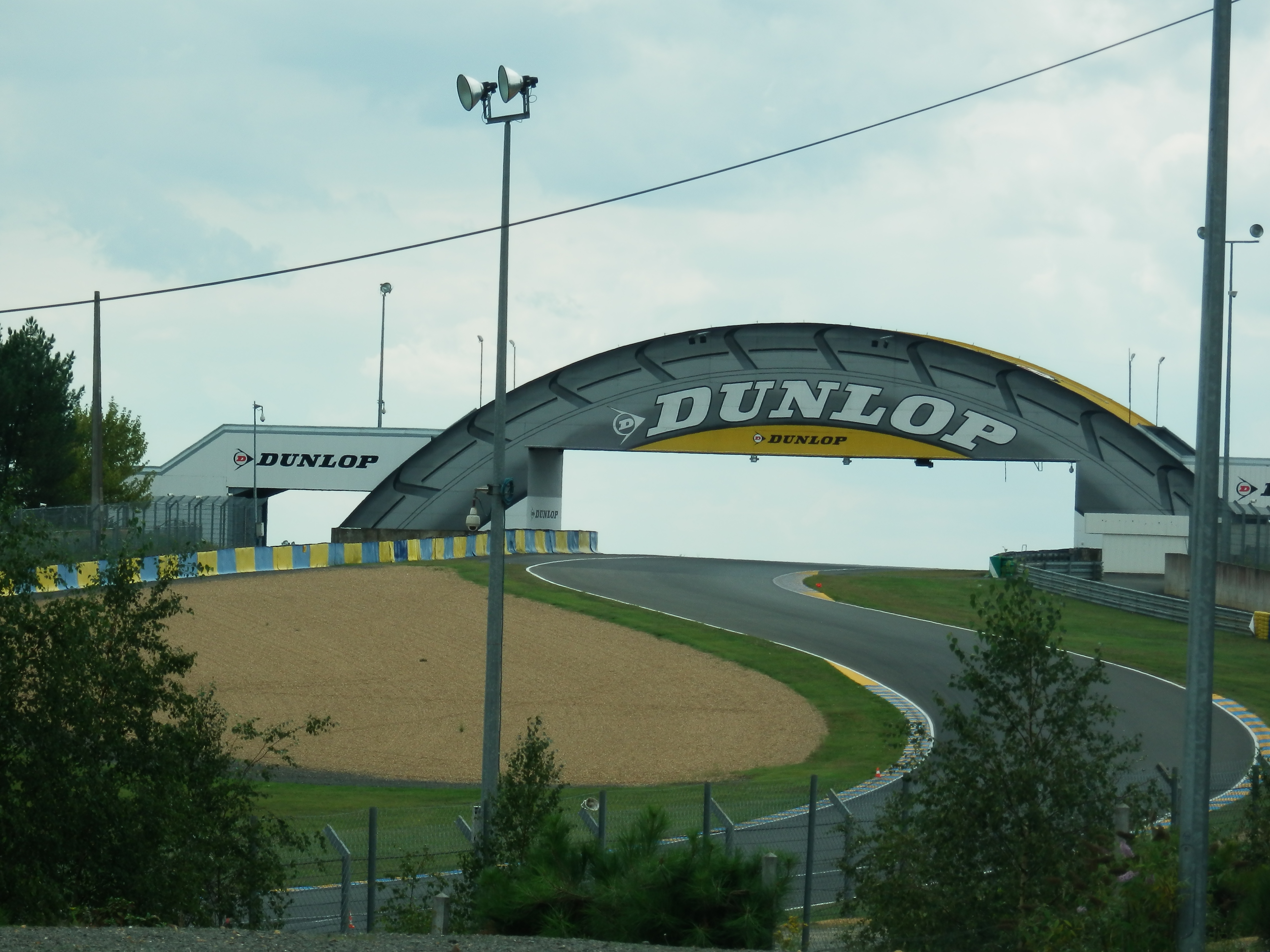
Circuit de la Sarthe, also known as Le Mans for its association with the 24 Hours of Le Mans, partly runs on public road.

- Ain-Diab, Morocco
- Aix-les-Bains Circuit du Lac, France
- Alemannenring, Germany (DTM)
- Ards Circuit, Northern Ireland, UK
- **Baku**, Azerbaijan (F1)
- Baku World Challenge, Azerbaijan (FIA GT)
- Barcelona Montjuïc, Spain (F1, MotoGP)
- Barcelona Pedralbes, Spain (F1)
- Berlin Karl-Marx Allee, Germany (Formula E)
- **Berlin Tempelhof,** Germany (Formula E)
- Bern, Switzerland (Formula E)
- Bilbao, Spain (World Series by Renault)
- Billown Circuit, Isle of Man
- Birmingham, England, UK (F3000, BTCC)
- Boavista, Portugal (F1, WTCC)
- Boyne 100, Ireland
- Bucharest, Romania (FIA GT, British F3)
- Cagliari, Italy (Euro F3000)
- Circuit de Chimay, Belgium
- Circuit Paalgraven, Netherlands
- Clady Circuit, Northern Ireland, UK
- Clypse Course, Isle of Man
- Dundrod Circuit, Northern Ireland, UK
- Durban, South Africa (A1GP)
- Four Inch Course, Isle of Man
- Frohburger Dreieck, Germany
- Geneva, Switzerland
- Göteborg City Race, Sweden (STCC)
- Helsinki Thunder, Finland (FIA GT, F3000, DTM)
- Highroads Course, Isle of Man
- Horice Road Racing Circuit, Czech Republic
- **Imatra Circuit**, Finland (Motorcycle races)
- Killalane Road Races, Ireland
- Circuito Lasarte, Spain (Grand Prix)
- La Bañeza, Spain (Classic motorbikes, 125GP, Moto3)
- **Le Mans**, France (WEC)
- London Battersea Park, England, UK (Formula E)
- **London ExCel Arena**, England, UK (Formula E)
- **Marrakech**, Morocco (WTCR, Auto GP, Formula E)
- Masaryk street circuit, Czech Republic (GP, ETCC, MotoGP)
- Mille Miglia, Italy (WSC)
- **Monaco**, Montecarlo (F1, F2, Formula E, FREC)
- Moscow, Russia (Formula E)
- Nikola Tesla Belgrade, Serbia (Belgrade24h promo race 2010, Serbian National Championship)
- Noordzee omloop, Belgium
- **Nuremberg**, Germany (DTM)
- North West 200, Northern Ireland, UK
- Oliver's Mount, England, UK
- Opatija, Croatia
- Paris, France (Formula E)
- **Pau**, France (F3, WTCC, WTCR, Euroformula Open)
- Palanga, Lithuania
- Pirita-Kose-Kloostrimetsa Circuit, Estonia
- Rome EUR, Italy (Formula E)
- **Seinäjoki Vauhtiajot Circuit**, Finland
- Skerries Road Racing Circuit, Ireland
- **Snaefell Mountain Course**, Isle of Man
- Solitude Racetrack, Germany (Motorcycle races)
- St John's Short Course, Isle of Man
- Tandragee 100 Road Race Circuit, Ireland
- Těrlický okruh, Czech Republic
- Tolbert, Netherlands
- Targa Florio, Italy (WSC)
- Tripoli, Libya
- Valencia, Spain (F1, Spanish F3, International GT Open)
- Varsselring, Netherlands
- **Vila Real**, Portugal (WTCC, WTCR)
- Zurich, Switzerland (Formula E)

=== Oceania ===
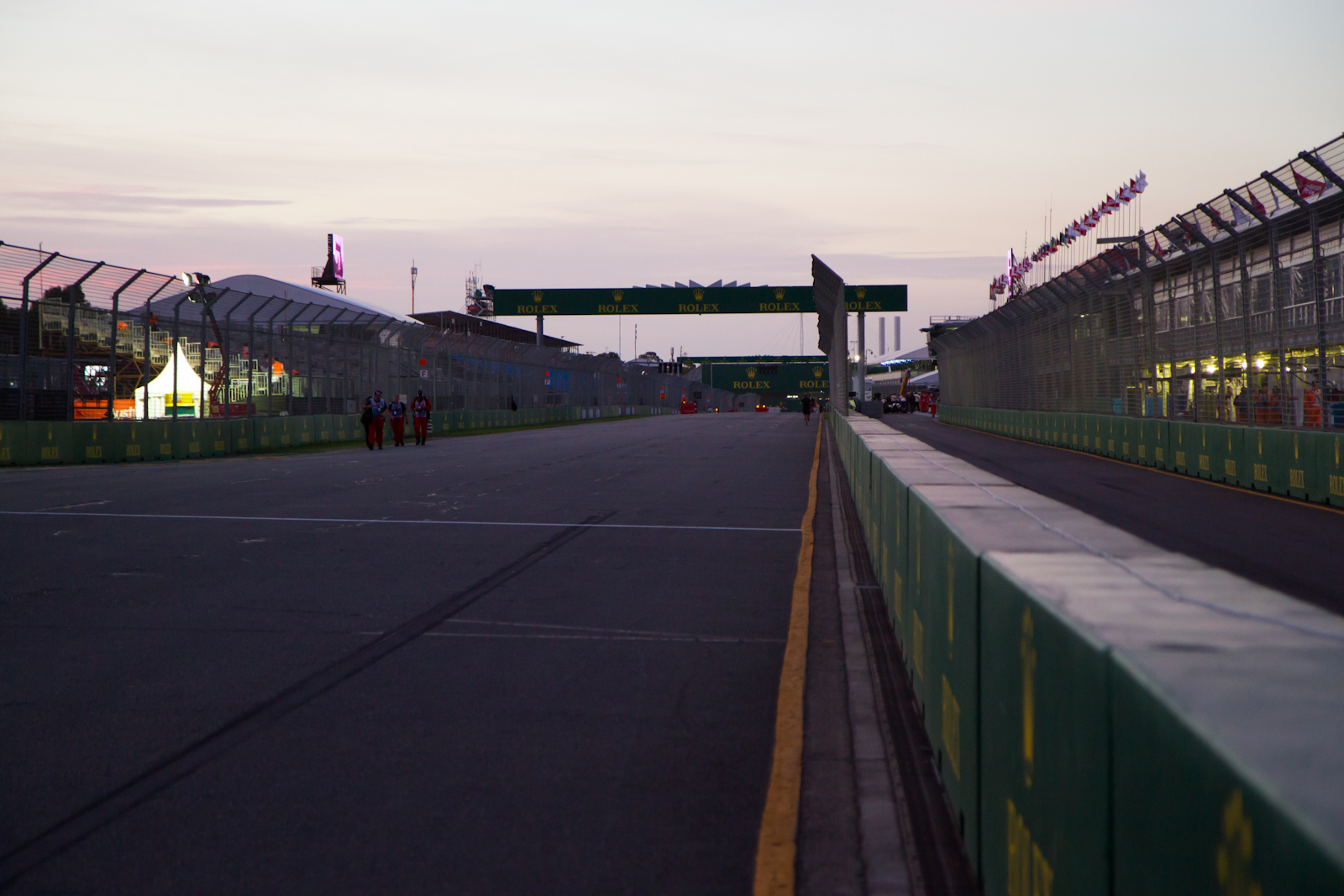
Albert Park Circuit, Australia

- **Adelaide**, Australia (F1, ALMS, Supercars)
- **Bathurst**, Australia (Supercars, Intercontinental GT Challenge)
- Canberra, Australia (Supercars)
- Dunedin, New Zealand
- **Gold Coast**, Australia (CART, Supercars)
- Hamilton, New Zealand (Supercars, Toyota Racing Series)
- **Melbourne**, Australia (F1, Supercars)
- **Newcastle**, Australia (Supercars)
- Paeroa, New Zealand
- Sydney Olympic Park, Australia (Supercars)
- **Townsville**, Australia (Supercars)
- Wanganui, New Zealand (Boxing Day Motorbike Races)
- Wellington, New Zealand (Touring Cars)

=== Never used ===
- Hanoi Street Circuit, Vietnam (planned for F1 in 2020, cancelled due to the COVID-19 pandemic, later abandoned in 2021)
- Port Imperial Street Circuit, New Jersey, USA (proposed for F1 in 2013, abandoned as of 2016)

== See also ==
- Figure 8 racing
- Open Road Racing
- Oval track racing
- Motorcycle Road Racing
