= Mosport Can-Am =

Canadian-American Challenge Cup
- Location: Mosport Park; Bowmanville, Ontario, Canada
- Corporate sponsor: Pepsi-Cola, Player's, Labatt's, Molson, Budweiser
- First race: 1966
- First Can-Am race: 1986
- Most wins (driver): Denny Hulme (3)
- Most wins (team): McLaren (5)
- Most wins (manufacturer): Frissbee (7)

Circuit information
- Surface: Asphalt
- Length: 3.957 km (2.459 mi)
- Turns: 10

The Mosport Can-Am races were Can-Am series sports car races held from 1966 to 1986 at Mosport International Raceway in Bowmanville, Ontario, Canada.

== Winners ==
Year	Drivers	Team	Car	Distance/Duration	Race title	Report
1966	(United States) Mark Donohue	(United States) Roger Penske Racing Enterprises	Lola T70 Mk.2-Chevrolet	2 hours	6th Canadian Grand Prix for the Pepsi-Cola Trophy	report
1967	(New Zealand) Denny Hulme	(United Kingdom) McLaren Cars	McLaren M6A-Chevrolet	200 miles (320 km)	Player's 200	report
1968	Not held					
1969	(New Zealand) Bruce McLaren	(United Kingdom) McLaren Cars	McLaren M8B-Chevrolet	200 miles (320 km)	Labatt's Blue Trophy	report
1970	(United States) Dan Gurney	(United Kingdom) McLaren Cars	McLaren M8D-Chevrolet	200 miles (320 km)	Labatt's Blue Trophy	report
1971	(New Zealand) Denny Hulme	(United Kingdom) McLaren Cars Ltd.	McLaren M8F-Chevrolet	200 miles (320 km)	Labatt's Blue Trophy	report
1972	(New Zealand) Denny Hulme	(United Kingdom) Bruce McLaren Motor Racing	McLaren M20-Chevrolet	200 miles (320 km)	Labatt's Blue Trophy	report
1973	(United States) Charlie Kemp	(United States) Rinzler Motoracing/Royal Crown	Porsche 917/10 TC	200 miles (320 km)	Labatt's Blue Trophy	report
1974	(United Kingdom) Jackie Oliver	(United States) Phoenix Racing Organizations, Inc.	Shadow DN4-Chevrolet	200 km (120 mi)	Labatt's Blue Trophy Mosport 200	report
1975–1976: Series not contested
1977	(France) Patrick Tambay	(United States) Carl A. Haas Racing Teams, Ltd.	Lola T333CS-Chevrolet	1 hour, 15 minutes	Molson Diamond Can-Am	report
1978	(Australia) Alan Jones	(United States) Carl A. Haas Racing Teams, Ltd.	Lola T333CS-Chevrolet	150 miles (240 km)	Molson Diamond Can-Am	report
1979	(Belgium) Jacky Ickx	(United States) Carl A. Haas Racing Teams, Ltd.	Lola T333CS-Chevrolet	150 miles (240 km)	Molson Golden Can-Am	report
1980	(France) Patrick Tambay	(United States) Carl A. Haas Racing Teams, Ltd.	Lola T530-Chevrolet	150 miles (240 km)	Molson Golden Can-Am	report
1981 (June)	(Italy) Teo Fabi	(United States) Paul Newman Racing	March 817-Chevrolet	150 miles (240 km)	Molson Can-Am	report
1981 (Sept.)	(Italy) Teo Fabi	(United States) Paul Newman Racing	March 817-Chevrolet	150 miles (240 km)	Molson Can-Am	report
1982 (June)	(United States) Al Unser Jr.	(United States) Galles Racing	Frissbee-Galles GR2-Chevrolet	200 km (120 mi)	Labatt's Blue Can-Am	report
1982 (Sept.)	(United States) Al Unser Jr.	(United States) Galles Racing	Frissbee-Galles GR2-Chevrolet	150 miles (240 km)	Labatt's Blue Can-Am	report
1983 (June)	(Canada) Jacques Villeneuve	(Canada) Canadian Tire Racing	Frissbee-Galles GR3-Chevrolet	150 miles (240 km)	Labatt's Can-Am	report
1983 (Sept.)	(United Kingdom) Jim Crawford	(United States) Fernley Racing	Ensign N180B-Ford	200 km (120 mi)	Labatt's Can-Am	report
1984 (June)	(Republic of Ireland) Michael Roe	(United States) Dallas Motorsports Inc.	VDS-002-Chevrolet	150 miles (240 km)	Budweiser Can-Am	report
1984 (Sept.)	(Republic of Ireland) Michael Roe	(United States) Dallas Motorsports Inc.	VDS-004-Chevrolet	150 miles (240 km)	Budweiser Can-Am	report
1985 (June)	(Canada) Horst Kroll	(Canada) Kroll Auto Service	Frissbee KR3-Chevrolet	150 miles (240 km)	Budweiser Can-Am	report
1985 (Sept.)	(United States) Rick Miaskiewicz	(United States) Mosquito Autosport-RCV Corp.	Frissbee GR3-Chevrolet	150 miles (240 km)	Budweiser Speed Week	report
1986 (June)	(Canada) Horst Kroll	(Canada) Kroll Racing	Frissbee KR3-Chevrolet	150 miles (240 km)	SCCA Can-Am Challenge	report
1986 (Sept.)	(Canada) Paul Tracy	(Canada) Kroll Racing	Frissbee KR4-Chevrolet	40 minutes	Budweiser 650	report

== See also ==
- Grand Prix of Mosport
- Mosport Trans-Am
- Chevrolet Silverado 250
- Mosport 200
- Canadian Grand Prix
- Canadian Motorcycle Grand Prix
- Telegraph Trophy 200 / Molson Diamond Indy
