= Frissbee KR3 =

Prototype racing car

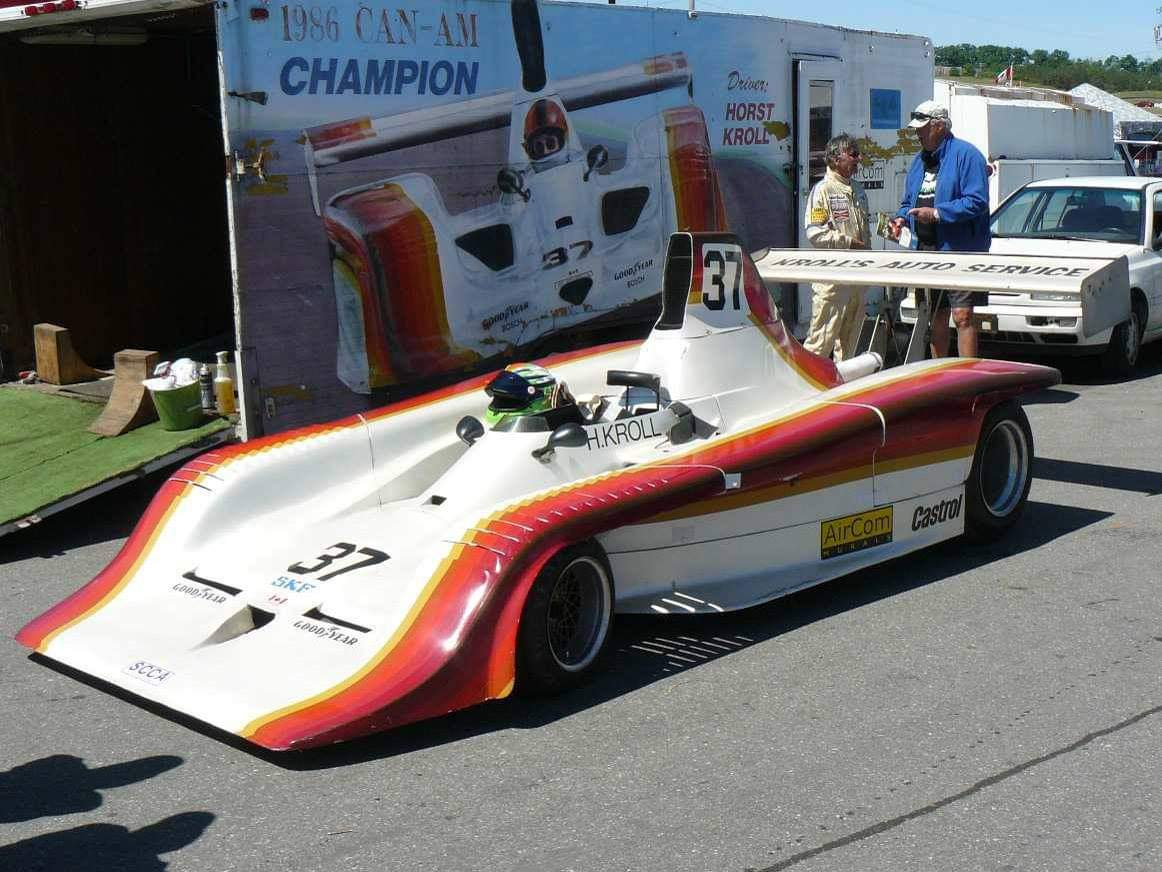
- Category: Can-Am
- Constructor: Frissbee
- Predecessor: Lola T330
- Successor: Frissbee KR4

Technical specifications
- Engine: Chevrolet 5,000 cc (305.1 cu in) V8 engine naturally-aspirated mid-engined
- Transmission: 5-speed Manual
- Power: 585 hp (436 kW); 575 lb⋅ft (780 N⋅m)
- Weight: 700 kg (1,543 lb)
- Tyres: Goodyear and Hoosier

Competition history
- Notable entrants: Horst Kroll Racing
- Notable drivers: Horst Kroll
- Debut: 1984 Can-Am Mosport Park
Races	Wins
29	2
- Drivers' Championships: 2: (1986 Can-Am, 1986 Canadian-American Thundercars Championship)

The Frissbee KR3 was an American sports prototype racing car, built by Frissbee in 1984 for the Can-Am series. Originally built by Lola Cars as a Lola T330, it featured a 5-litre Chevrolet V8 engine, and was used by Horst Kroll Racing between 1984 and 1987. Horst Kroll used the car to win both the Can-Am and Canadian American Thundercars Championship in 1986.

== Racing history ==
The Frissbee KR3 started as a Lola T330 and featured a 5-litre Chevrolet V8 engine. It was first used by Horst Kroll's self-run Horst Kroll Racing team at the opening round of the 1984 Can-Am season, held at Mosport; he finished in fourth place. At Dallas, he finished eighth, and fifth of the full Can-Am entries, before finishing second at Brainerd, fifth at Lime Rock, second at Road Atlanta, and fourth at Trois-Rivières. The next round of the season was held again at Mosport; he went one better than the first race of the season and took the KR3 to third place. He finished the season with eighth at Sears Point, fourth at Riverside, and eighth in the final round of the season, held at Green Valley. Kroll finished the season in third place, with 119 points; 37 behind Jim Crawford, and 31 ahead of Kim Campbell.

Kroll used the KR3 again in 1985 and started the season with a win at Mosport. The next two rounds, both held at Lime Rock, were less successful; Kroll finished tenth overall, and fifth of the full Can-Am cars in the first race, before taking fourth overall, and second in class, in the second race, held two months later. The fourth race of the season was held again at Mosport; Kroll returned to the podium, taking second place. The penultimate race of the season was held at St. Louis International Raceway, where Kroll again finished second. He finished the season by finishing eleventh overall, and sixth in class, at the St. Petersburg Grand Prix. Kroll finished second in the Driver's championship, with 71 points; ten behind Rick Miaskiewicz in a similar Frissbee GR3 and 19 ahead of Lou Sell in a 2-litre March 832.

For 1986, the Can-Am series saw a partial split; a new Canadian American Thundercars Championship (CAT) was formed, and four races were shared between the two, with a fifth race being held as part of the latter series. Kroll started the 1986 season in the same way he had started the 1985 season; by winning the opening race at Mosport in his Frissbee KR3. Kroll followed this with fourth overall, second in the O2L class at Summit Point, and a pair of second places, at St. Louis and Mosport. As a result, Kroll won the Can-Am championship, with 64 points; 11 points more than his closest rival, Bill Tempero, who drove a March 84C. Kroll finished the CAT season with sixth place at Hallett, having taken tenth in the first race, and fourth in the second. This was enough to also secure him the CAT title, beating Tempero by ten points.

In 1987, the Can-Am series folded, and the CAT series took over. Kroll continued to use the KR3, but retired after four laps from the first race of the season, held at Willow Springs, before finishing third at the second race; this was enough to secure a seventh place at the meeting. He then took third at Hallett and Milwaukee, before finishing fourth at Sanair. Kroll finished the season by taking eighth at both Pueblo and Phoenix; his 65 points were enough for him to take third in the Driver's championship once again. He finished 27 points behind Al Lamb in a similar Frissbee GR2, and three ahead of Buddy Lazier in a March 85C. The CAT series was replaced by the American Indycar Series in 1988, and the KR3 was not used again.
