= Paul Tracy =

Canadian racing driver (born 1968)

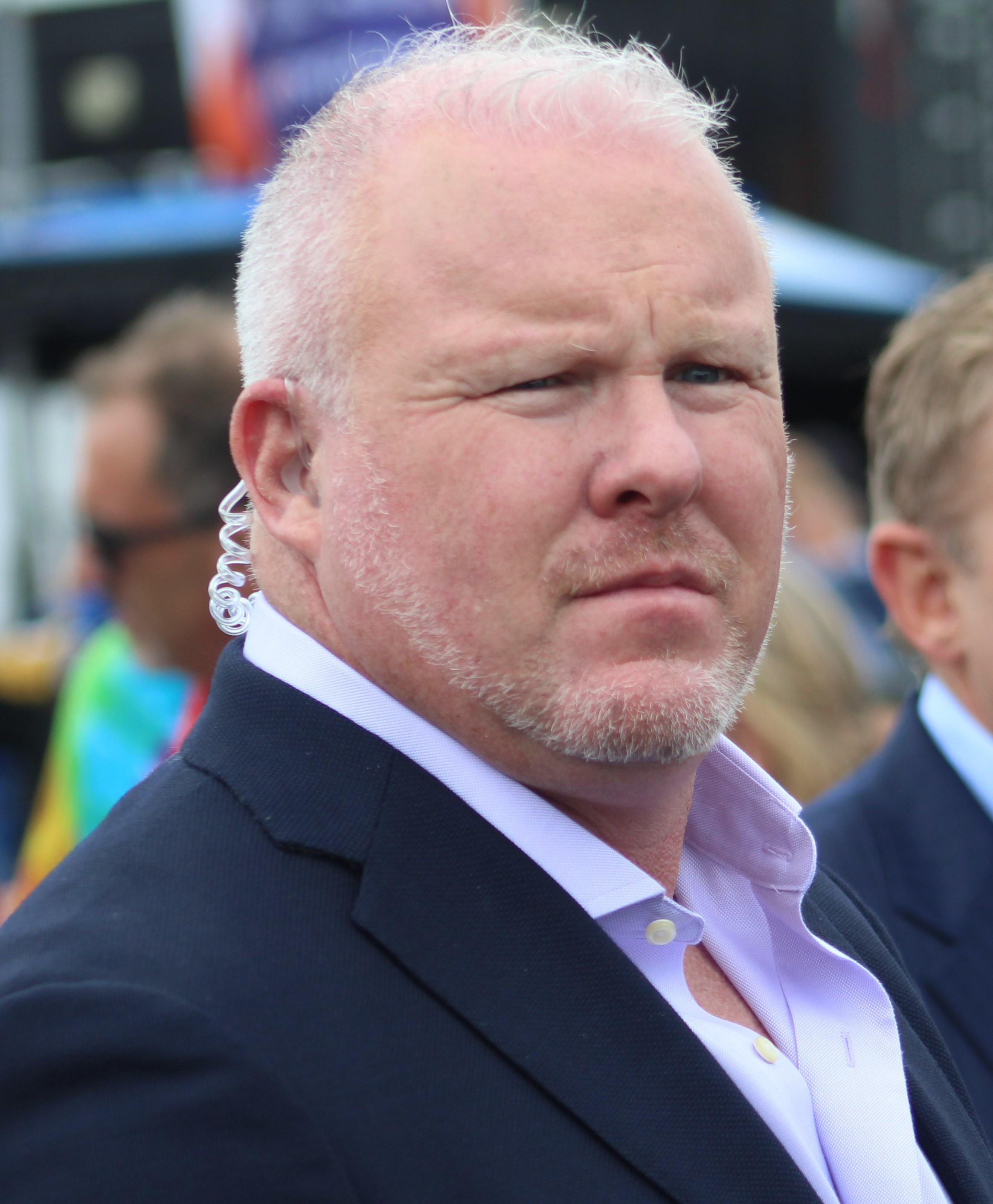
- Tracy at the 2018 ABC Supply 500
- Nationality: (Canada) Canadian
- Born: Paul Anthony Tracy; December 17, 1968 (age 57) Scarborough, Ontario, Canada

IndyCar Series
- Years active: 2002, 2008–2011
- Teams: Team Green; Vision Racing; A. J. Foyt Enterprises; KV Racing Technology; Dragon Racing; Dreyer & Reinbold Racing
- Starts: 20
- Best finish: 22nd in 2009

Previous series
- 1986 1988–90 1991–2003 2004–07 2006–07, 12 2013–14, 16: Can-Am Series; American Racing Series; CART; Champ Car World Series; Grand-Am Rolex Sports Car Series; Stadium Super Trucks

Championship titles
- 1990 2003: American Racing Series; CART/Champ Car World Series

Awards
- 1990 1993 1999 2000: Bruce McLaren Trophy; Most Improved Driver; All-Star Team; All-Star Team

NASCAR O'Reilly Auto Parts Series career
- 6 races run over 1 year
- Best finish: 76th (2006)
- First race: 2006 Hershey's Kissables 300 (Daytona)
- Last race: 2006 Ameriquest 300 (Fontana)
Wins	Top tens	Poles
0	0	0

NASCAR FedEx Freight Truck Series career
- 1 race run over 1 year
- Best finish: 84th (2008)
- First race: 2008 Chevy Silverado 350K (Texas)
Wins	Top tens	Poles
0	0	0

Paul Anthony Tracy (born December 17, 1968) is a Canadian-American professional auto racing driver who participated in Champ Car World Series, the IndyCar Series, and the Championship Auto Racing Teams (CART). He started kart racing at the age of five and quickly became successful and began car racing at sixteen, finishing third in the 1985 Formula Ford 1600 championship with one win and Rookie of the Year honors. Tracy became the youngest Canadian Formula Ford champion in the 1985 CASC Formula 1600 Challenge Series and was the youngest Can-Am race winner the following year. He raced in the American Racing Series for three years between 1988 and 1990, winning the series title with nine wins from fourteen races in 1990.

Tracy's CART career began in the 1991 season with Dale Coyne Racing. However, following one race, he drove three races for Penske Racing. He competed with Penske in eleven races during the 1992 season, finishing on the podium three times. In the 1993 season, Tracy finished third in the drivers' standings after winning five races. The following year, Tracy won three more races. He moved to Newman/Haas Racing for the 1995 season, winning two races before returning to Penske for the 1996 championship. Tracy won another three races in the 1997 season before being fired for criticizing the car and joined Team Green the following year. He was third in the 1999 championship with two victories but fell to fifth in 2000 season despite three more wins. Tracy's form declined over the next two seasons but won one race in 2002. He joined Forsythe Racing in the 2003 championship, winning his first (and only) series title with seven victories.

In the renamed Champ Car World Series (CCWS) in 2004 and 2005, Tracy won two races for fourth overall in both seasons. Tracy's performance declined during a 2006 season in which he took three podium finishes. His final Champ Car victory came in the 2007 championship. Following the unification of the CCWS and the IndyCar Series, he raced part-time for the KV Racing Technology, Vision Racing, A. J. Foyt Enterprises, Dreyer & Reinbold Racing and Dragon Racing teams over the following three years. Tracy entered NASCAR-sanctioned stock car races in its Busch Series and the Camping World Truck Series, sports car racing through the Rolex Sports Car Series as well as the Stadium Super Trucks and the Superstar Racing Experience.

Nicknamed "The Thrill from West Hill" for his aggressive driving style and his bad boy image, Tracy's outspoken nature saw him placed on probation and fined several times by CART. He analysed IndyCar races for the Canadian broadcaster Sportsnet in the 2013 season and then for NBCSN between the 2014 and 2021 seasons. Tracy is an inductee of the Long Beach Motorsports Walk of Fame, the Canadian Motorsport Hall of Fame and the Ontario Sports Hall of Fame.

== Early life ==
Tracy was born in Scarborough, Ontario, Canada on December 17, 1968, and grew up in the working-class bedroom suburb east of Toronto. He is the son of Northern Ireland-born house painter Tony Tracy, who was the president of Trabur Painting, and his English wife Vivienne Tracy. Tony rode a Velocette in England and Ireland before injuring himself in an accident and emigrating to Canada with his two brothers in the 1960s. Tracy has two older half-sisters from his father's first marriage and a younger sister. He attended Jack Miner Public High School and continued attending while karting, graduating after passing all of his subjects.

== Junior racing career ==
Tracy got his first miniature motorized mini-bike when he was four, and received his first small motorized children's go-kart from his father aged five. His father's painting company provided enough funds for his son to compete in karts and, later, cars. He drove every weekend on tracks in Central and Eastern Canada as well as the Northern United States; Tracy had to prepare and maintain his kart because his father worked long hours. He was inspired by four-time Indianapolis 500 winner A. J. Foyt, and learnt go-karting from driver Scott Goodyear, before he progressed from the junior class to the senior category when he was twelve years old. Tracy won the Canadian Senior Karting Championship twice and 91 of 94 races in his first full senior season. He entered the North American Race of Champions and finished in the top ten of the Karting World Championship twice.

Tracy stopped racing karts upon turning fifteen, and his father had Goodyear teach him how to drive and handle race cars, as well as car setup. Aged sixteen, he progressed to car racing and his father wanted him to enter several European and North American events and race series as possible. Tracy finished third in the Formula Ford 1600 Championship with one victory, and was named Rookie of the Year. He raced in the 1985 CASC Formula 1600 Challenge Series with Colin Hines Racing in a small Van Diemen RF85-Ford formula open-wheel car. Tracy was Formula Ford's youngest Canadian champion following a season-long battle with Scott Maxwell. He retired from the CASC Formula Ford 2000 Canadian Run-Off in a Van Diemen RF86 and won the CASC Formula Ford 1600 Canadian Run-Off from pole position at Circuit Mont-Tremblant. Tracy also failed to start the FAQ Challenge Labatt 50 Formula 1600 round at the Circuit Gilles Villeneuve.

In 1986, (Note: Oil company Sunoco withdrew sponsorship for Tracy in 1986 due to a "reorganization of personnel" and was instead sponsored by cigarette manufacturer Rothmans. He switched to a 1986 Reynard from a year-old Van Diemen car as a result.) Tracy moved to the Formula 2000 and raced a Rothmans-entered Van Diemen RF86 single-seater open wheel car in the Canadian Formula 2000 Championship. Tracy was fourth overall, with one win at Sanair Super Speedway and three podium finishes for 164 points. He also raced four rounds of that year's Championnat Formule Ford 1600 du Quebec, winning the third Sanair round and did three races in the British Formula 2000 Championship with two podium finishes. Tracy raced a Porsche 944 for Mark Motors in the seven-round Porsche Challenge Series, finishing seventeenth overall with forty points. He finished twelfth in the Rothmans Porsche Canadian Run-Off and fifth in the Formula 2000 Canadian Run-Off in the Buick Grand National 1986 at Mont-Tremblant. Tracy accepted an offer from Canadian driver Horst Kroll to drive Kroll's third Frissbee KR4-Chevrolet car at the final round of the 1986 Can-Am Series—the Budweiser 650 at Canadian Tire Motorsport Park—after impressing Kroll with his abilities at Sanair. He took his first (and only) Can-Am victory from pole position and became its youngest ever winner at the age of seventeen. Tracy finished fifth in the Ford Race of Champions at Brands Hatch in England.

Tracy returned to the United Kingdom in late 1986 to race in the BBC Winter Grandstand Series for Formula Ford 2000 cars, finishing fourth overall, and worked for Van Diemen owner Ralph Firman Sr. Tracy won the season-opening Mosport Park round of the 1987 Canadian Formula 2000 Championship in a Trabur Painting-run Reynard 87SF the following year, finishing fifteenth overall with 59 points. (Note: Tracy originally won the second race of the season but was penalised for an unsafe overtake on Claude Bourbonnais and was demoted to seventh position.) He drove a Ralt RT4 car in three rounds of the HFC Formula Atlantic Challenge, finishing thirtieth in points with nine scored, and had an accident in the SCCA SPI International Formula Atlantic Championship round at Memphis International Raceway. Tracy also competed in four Porsche Challenge Series rounds, finishing third in Mosport and Montreal. He completed his Canadian racing season early in August 1987 since he had nothing to gain by finishing the season.

Tracy competed in the ten-round New Zealand International Formula Pacific championship in early 1988, finishing third with David Brabham, with two wins at Timaru International Motor Raceway, four podium finishes, and one pole in a Ralt RT4-Ford for Graeme Lawrence Autosport. He switched to the Hemelgarn Racing team and progressed to the American Racing Series (ARS) (Note: The ARS was later renamed to Indy Lights.)—Championship Auto Racing Teams' (CART) developmental series— for the 1988 season with sponsorship funding acquired by his father. Driving the outdated, standard March 86A-Buick V6 Wildcat car raced by all ARS participants, Tracy won the season-opening round at Phoenix Raceway but unreliability and accidents affected the rest of his season with four more top-tens. He finished tenth in the final standings with 58 points and was voted ARS Rookie of the Year.

Tracy's father formed the Maple Leaf Racing team for his son to race in the 1989 ARS season after Tracy was reportedly one of three drivers considered to drive for Footwork's Japanese Formula 3000 squad. He finished in the top ten five times in eleven races, with best finishes of second place at Phoenix and Portland International Raceway due to his retirement from most races, and finished eighth in the drivers' championship with 65 points. Tracy also finished fifth in the 1989 Corvette Challenge round at Toronto with Jumbo Racing. In November 1989, he tested a Reynard Formula 3000 car for Eddie Jordan Racing at Silverstone Circuit to evaluate him as a full-time driver for the 1990 International Formula 3000 Championship but declined team owner Eddie Jordan's offer of a race seat due to the trouble of attracting Canadian sponsors.

Tracy joined team owner Brian Stewart and his Landford Racing team for the 1990 ARS season, acquiring sponsorship but on the condition he would be withdrawn from a race if his father attended an event outside of Toronto and the final round at Laguna Seca. (Note: The Toronto Star reported in March 1990 that Van Diemen was approached to build a Formula 3000 car for Tracy to drive in the 1991 International Formula 3000 Championship and was awaiting final confirmation before it could proceed with the project.) He and his crew spent two weeks in Arizona, testing and preparing his car for the races. Tracy dominated the season with consistency, winning nine of fourteen races and setting records for most pole positions in a season (seven) and consecutive victories (four). He also led the most laps, despite CART forcing drivers mid-season rule requiring drivers to be alongside each other during a race restart following a yellow flag caution period. Tracy finished the season with a season-record 214 points and secured the series title with three races remaining. (Note: Greg Moore is the current holder for the most Indy Lights wins (ten) in one season and points scored in a single season (242).) He finished second in the Canadian Formula 2000 Championship race at Mosport Park in a Van Diemen 90RF car.

== American-open wheel racing career ==
=== 1991–1997 ===
Steve Horne, Truesports manager-owner, gave Tracy a test session in a Lola-Judd car at Mid-Ohio Sports Car Course in September 1990 and was signed on the option of a three-month retainer testing contract for 1991 in October 1990 after lapping faster than regular driver Raul Boesel. Truesports offered him a three-year contract to partner Scott Pruett, but sponsor Budweiser refused since he was 21 and too young for them to promote him. Tracy rejected an offer to drive four races for the team. Tracy received no other CART offers, so his father rented a year-old No. 39 Lola T90/00-Chevrolet car from Dale Coyne Racing (DCR) owner Dale Coyne for the Toyota Grand Prix of Long Beach after he could not obtain sponsorship from Canadian companies and had to refinance the family home. Making his CART debut in the second round of the 1991 season, he qualified fourteenth but his engine overheated due to a broken water pipe, leaving him 22nd. Tracy did not race again with DCR that year.

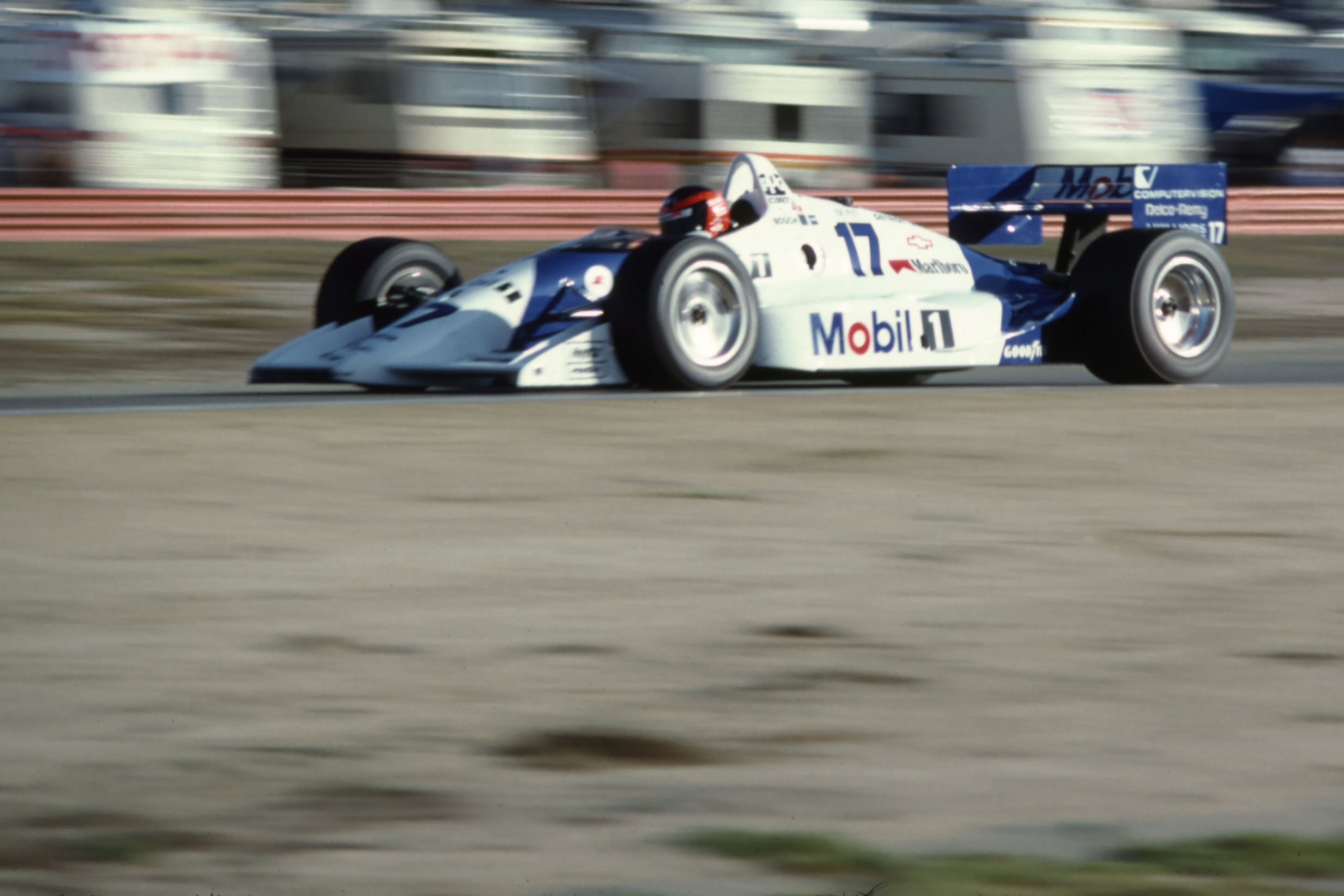
Tracy driving for Penske at the 1991 Monterey Grand Prix

Tracy's work had impressed Penske Racing owner Roger Penske, who would surprise the family by calling them while they ate dinner in Scarborough and requesting they meet him in Detroit that same night. Tracy was offered a five-year testing contract with no guarantees of competitive driving and had to relocate to Pennsylvania, with Penske not accepting any negotiation or review. He would replace Danny Sullivan, testing and developing cars for CART champions Emerson Fittipaldi and Rick Mears, and began a training program to increase muscle and lose weight on Penske's orders. Tracy completed a 500 mi (800 km) engine endurance test at Michigan International Speedway before proceeding to Mid-Ohio, where he outpaced regular driver Fittipaldi. After being pleased by Tracy's performance and preparing him for driving on an superspeedway before the Indianapolis 500, Penske put Tracy in his third car in the Michigan 500 in August. Starting eighth in the year-old No. 17 Penske PC-19-Chevrolet, he lost control as he got too close to driver Scott Brayton and crashed, breaking the fibula and tibia in his lower left leg. Tracy was allowed to enter the season's final two races at Nazareth Speedway and Laguna Seca after going on a therapy program on Fittipaldi's advice, and he finished seventh in the former. He was third in the Rookie of the Year standings.

Tracy raced eleven times for Penske in the 1992 season and tested the team's new Chevrolet V8B engine for Fittipaldi and Mears. Tracy lost more weight in the off-season by hiring a trainer and starting a fitness program. He drove a year-old PC-19-Chevrolet vehicle before switching to the PC-20-Chevrolet car from Detroit. Tracy qualified sixth for the season's second round, the Valvoline 200 in Phoenix, and finished fourth two laps down. Tracy debuted in the Indianapolis 500 that year, starting nineteenth and finishing twentieth due to a gearbox failure. He filled in for the injured Mears at Detroit and again for the rest of the season starting from the Molson Indy Toronto. Tracy finished a season-high second in both Detroit and Mid-Ohio and took his first CART pole at Road America. He ended the season twelfth in the Drivers' Championship with 59 points.

Tracy stayed with Penske for the 1993 championship and drove full-time after Mears retired, and was trained by the latter. He expected to be sacked after Penske tested McLaren's Formula One (F1) driver Ayrton Senna at Phoenix, but continued racing for Penske. Tracy's No. 12 Penske PC-22-Chevrolet retired from five of the first six rounds due to either mechanical failure or accidents. He started second at the Toyota Grand Prix of Long Beach, the season's third race, and led 81 of 105 laps for his maiden CART victory. Tracy won consecutive races, the Grand Prix of Cleveland at Burke Lakefront Airport after leading 69 laps from pole position, and the Molson Indy Toronto a week later. He started the New England 200 at New Hampshire Motor Speedway fourth and led 130 laps before being passed by Nigel Mansell with four laps left for the win. Tracy won his final two races of the season by leading all fifty laps of the Texaco/Havoline 200 at Road America and 81 laps of the Toyota Grand Prix of Monterey at Laguna Seca. He was third in the drivers' standings with 157 points after a late-season duel with Bobby Rahal and Boesel.

Before the 1994 season, Tracy was assigned Dave Stevenson as his manager by Penske to relieve him of most personal and sponsorship functions. He raced in the new No. 3 PC-23 chassis, a rebuild of the previous year's car powered by an improved Ilmor V8 engine. Tracy was unreliable in three of the first four races, and was involved in a multi-car crash in Phoenix after qualifying on pole there and in Long Beach. He finished in the top ten for the first time in 1994 in the Milwaukee Mile before winning the Detroit Grand Prix after colliding with teammate Al Unser Jr. on the 55th lap, which sent Unser into a tire wall. Tracy had five more top fives with podiums in Portland, Cleveland, Mid-Ohio and New Hampshire and took pole position in Elkhart Lake before an engine failure left him eighteenth. He ended 1994 with wins in the Bosch Spark Plug Grand Prix at Nazareth, when he led 192 of 200 laps, and the Bank of America 300 at Laguna Seca, where he started from pole position three weeks later. Tracy was third overall with 152 points.

Following Penske's return to a two-car team, Tracy's father discovered a provision prohibiting him from driving one-year old cars for either the small, underfunded Bettenhausen Motorsport or Hogan Racing squads and Tracy did not want to race for underachieving teams. He signed a three-year contract with team owners Carl Haas and Paul Newman in October 1994 to replace the retired Mario Andretti at Newman/Haas Racing, but Penske could resign him for the 1996 season if Fittipaldi left after the 1995 championship. (Note: He was approached to drive for Chip Ganassi Racing and was told by Michael Andretti it would be better for him to not join Newman/Haas Racing and that signing for Ganassi would be better for his future career.) Tracy drove the underpowered No. 3 Lola T95/00-Ford. In the season's second round, the Australian Indy Car Grand Prix at Surfers Paradise, he won his first race of the season, passing teammate Michael Andretti with eight laps left. Tracy took the championship lead after finishing fourth at Phoenix, before winning the Miller Genuine Draft 200 at Milwaukee by holding off Unser in the final laps. The rest of the season yielded six top tens with three second places at Road America, Mid-Ohio and Laguna Seca. Tracy's left ankle was injured in a karting accident, requiring him to deflate the clutch pedal with a specially built carbon fibre shield over his left racing boot. Tracy was sixth in the drivers' standings with 115 points.

His relationship with co-owner Haas worsened when he informed him that he would return to Penske on a four-year contract in 1996. Tracy took over for Fittipaldi, driving the new Penske PC-25 with an updated Mercedes-Benz engine. He underwent radial keratotomy to improve his vision, meaning he no longer required glasses. (Note: Tracy began wearing contact lenses as a result.) During practice for the Marlboro 500 at Michigan, Tracy broke the sixth vertebra, sustained a soft tissue injury and bruised his knees in a major accident. He was replaced by Jan Magnussen for the round at Mid-Ohio. Tracy finished the season with three pole positions (Homestead, Nazareth, and Milwaukee) in fourteen races marred by accidents and a noncompetitive car that forced him to push its tyres beyond their capability, six top-ten finishes, including a third-place finish at Milwaukee, and on-track rivalries with Robby Gordon and Michael Andretti. He finished thirteenth in the drivers' championship with 60 points, his worst finish since the 1992 season.

Tracy remained at Penske for the 1997 season, driving the Penske PC-26-Mercedes-Ilmor car, which was aerodynamically inefficient and lacked grip, especially on road courses. Penske shifted his focus on letting Tracy use his testing abilities to develop the car that he did not switch to the more competitive Reynard. He started the season second at Homestead before colliding with Chip Ganassi Racing's Alex Zanardi at Surfers Paradise and finishing eighth in Long Beach following collisions with Greg Moore and Paul Jasper, respectively. Tracy qualified on pole for the Bosch Spark Plug Grand Prix at Nazareth and led for 186 of the 225 laps to claim his first victory in 27 races. He won the following Rio 400 to move into the lead of the points standings and the Motorola 300 at Gateway International Raceway for a third successive victory two weeks later. Tracy qualified on pole in Milwaukee, missed the race in Detroit due to a diagnosis of benign paroxysmal positional vertigo, which made him dizzy and clouded his vision, and had four top-ten finishes that were followed by crashes in four of the final five rounds. He was fifth in the final points standings with 121.

Tracy's criticism of the car's performance grew louder, especially after what he viewed as an embarrassing finish at his home race in Toronto. His now public lobbying for the team to move away from the in-house chassis, Ilmor engine, and Goodyear tires were viewed by Penske as detrimental to the team's sponsors and suppliers, prompting the team to release him from his contract two years early before the 1998 season.

=== 1998–2003 ===
After Forsythe Racing owner Gerald Forsythe committed to drivers Patrick Carpentier and Moore, Tracy signed a one-year contract to drive the No. 26 Reynard 98I-Honda for Barry Green's two-car Team Green operation with finance from Brown & Williamson cigarette company in less than a week. In the nineteen races he entered that season, Tracy was involved in several accidents and achieved seven top-tens with a best finish of fifth in three races (Motegi, Nazareth and Mid-Ohio) for thirteenth overall with 61 points. He and team owner Green were involved in a pit lane alteration at Houston following Tracy's rear-end collision with teammate Dario Franchitti. Tracy was suspended from the first race of the following season because of Michael Andretti crashing into the back of his car when Tracy blocked him at Surfers Paradise and ten other incidents of car contact involving Tracy that year.

Tracy stayed with Team Green for the 1999 season, having signed a contract extension through the 2001 season as a result of the attention for his sponsor following his alteration in Houston. Tracy was assigned the retired Tony Cicale as an engineering consultant to work with and make the driver calmer by moderating his expectations of attempting to win every race, and the two had a cordial relationship. His one-race suspension saw him replaced in the No. 26 Reynard 99I-Honda car by Indy Racing League (IRL) driver Boesel for the season-opening round at Homestead. Tracy achieved one podium finish at Nazareth in the season's first six races. Following the Gateway round, in which he and Franchitti collided, Green told them that whomever was ahead in the remaining races would win, and the other driver was ordered not to attempt an overtake and risk a race-ending crash. Tracy's first victory of the season came at the Miller Lite 225 in Milwaukee, when Jimmy Vasser made a late race pit stop and Tracy saved fuel in the final five laps. He took four more podiums and won his second (and final) race of the season at the Texaco Grand Prix of Houston after leading 85 laps. Tracy finished third in the championship standings with 161 points.

Tracy drove Team Green's Reynard 2KI-Honda car for the 2000 season. Tracy started the season third at Homestead and won the following Toyota Grand Prix of Long Beach to take the lead in the points standings. He held the championship lead for the next five races until he was disqualified from the Detroit round for running over refueller Jeff Simon's foot and fracturing four of his toes during a pit stop, and then retired from the Portland race after crashing. Tracy had two top-ten finishes and qualified on pole at Michigan amid three more retirements in the next five races. He won successive races in the Motorola 220 at Road America and the following Molson Indy Vancouver after teammate Franchitti stalled during a pit stop to return to championship contention. Tracy finished fourth in Houston and crashed twice more in Gateway and Surfers Paradise in the following four races. Going into the season-ending Marlboro 500 at California Speedway, he was one of six drivers mathematically eligible to win the championship; however, Tracy's engine failed after 23 of 200 laps, leaving him fifth in the final drivers' standings with 134 points.

Tracy stayed with Team Green for the 2001 season and drove a Reynard 01I-Honda; in August 2000, he accepted the option of signing a four-year contract extension with the team through the 2005 season after rejecting a three-year contract offer from Team Forsythe to replace Carpentier when Green was willing to match Forsythe's offer. (Note: He stated that he was uncomfortable with signing short-term contracts at the conclusion of every season as well as the accompanying media speculation.) Tracy looked forward to sharing information with new technical partner Michael Andretti, but he was separated in pit lane owing to his slow qualifying pace, which made sharing information difficult. He finished no worse than fourth in the first three races and was tied for the championship lead with Cristiano da Matta following the Nazareth event. The rest of Tracy's season saw him finish in the top ten four more times, despite an unreliable car, accidents with other drivers, and pit lane blunders that dropped him down the points standings. He finished fourteenth in the championship standings with 73 points, (Note: CART chief steward Chris Kneifel deducted five points from Tracy's final points total for 2001 because of an accident with Oriol Servià in the Molson Indy Toronto and for unsafe driving in the Honda Grand Prix of Monterey.) his first winless season since 1998.

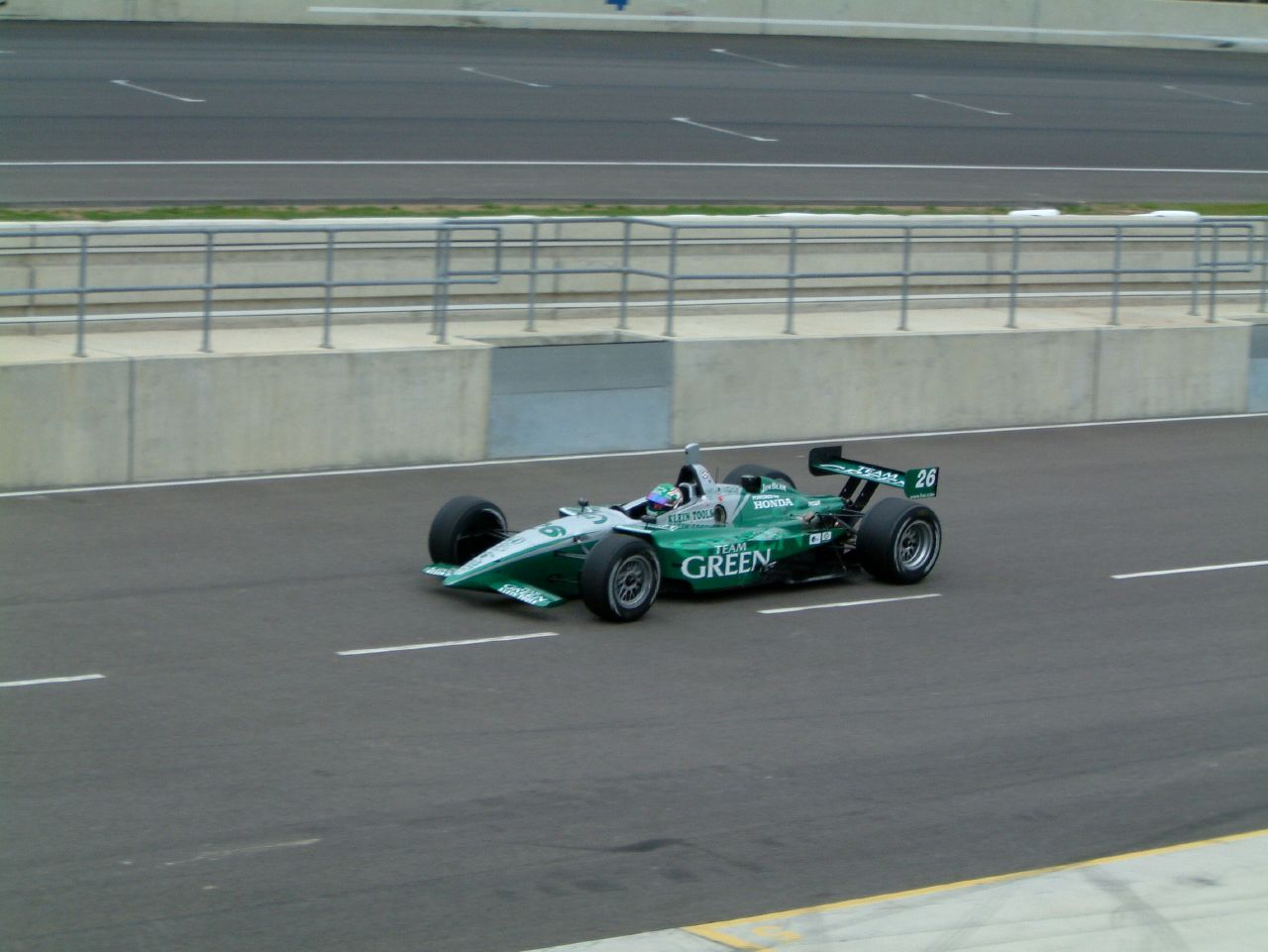
Tracy competing in the 2002 Sure for Men Rockingham 500

Tracy went on a weight loss/fitness program before the 2002 season and lost 30 kg (66 lb) for improved performance. He drove the Reynard 02I-Honda for the first two rounds before Green switched to the more compact Lola B02/00 chassis for the remaining races when Reynard entered receivership. (Note: Tracy had difficulty with the setup of the Reynard car during pre-season testing.) Tracy discovered that the Lola car handled better, but it may oversteer slightly while entering corners. He had two top-ten finishes in the season's first three races. He took the lead at the start of the Miller Lite 250 in Milwaukee and led 184 of the 250 laps to claim his first (and only) win of the season. Tracy earned three more podium finishes and three other top-ten finishes in the final fourteen races for eleventh overall and 101 points.

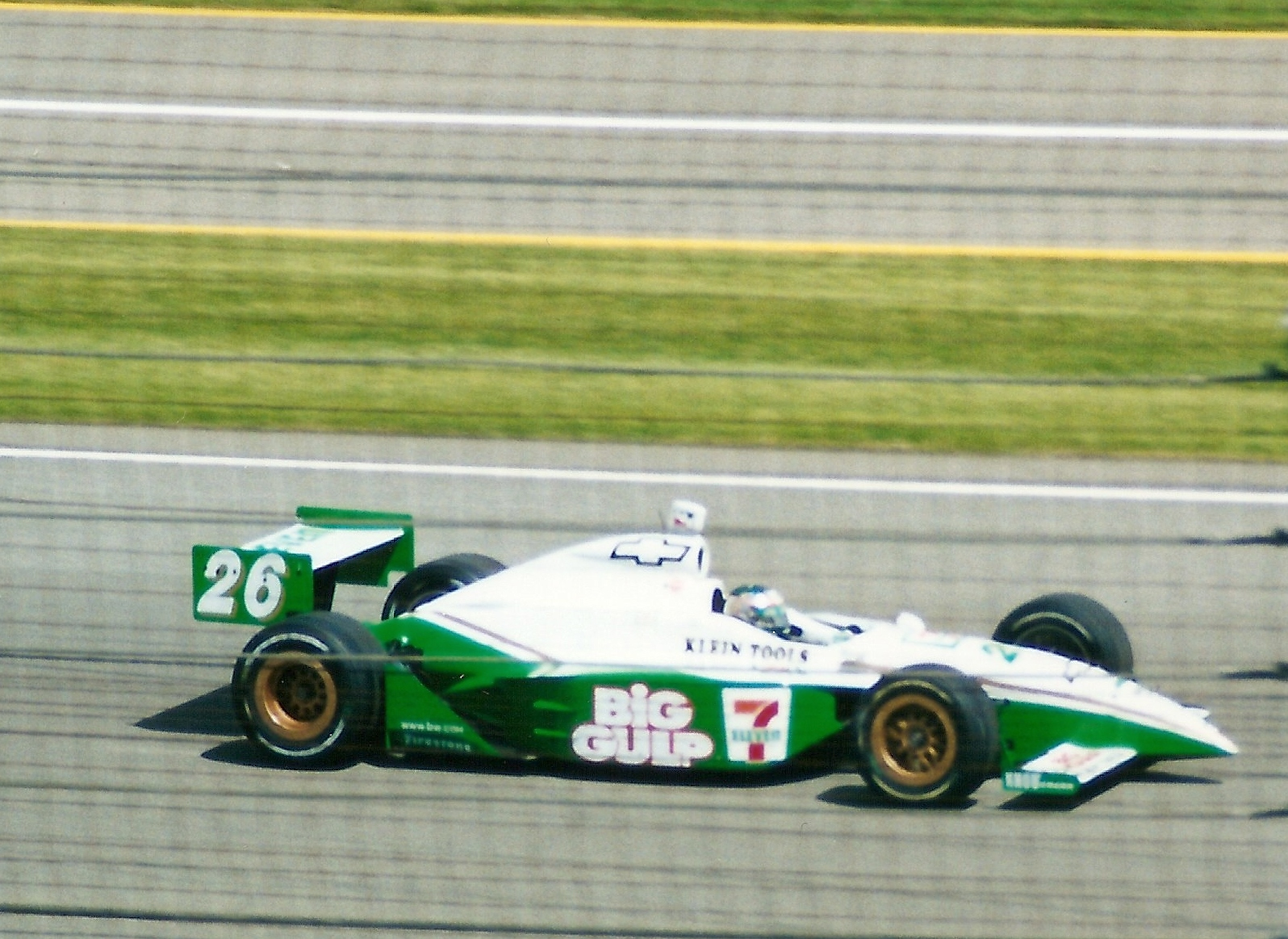
Tracy finished second in the 2002 Indianapolis 500, a result he disputes.

In May, Tracy made his IRL debut in the 2002 Indianapolis 500 driving Team Green's No. 26 Dallara IR-02-Chevrolet entry after Green wanted to enter the event. Starting from 29th, he was running in second with one-and-a-half laps to go when he overtook Penske driver Hélio Castroneves just as the yellow caution flag light came on for a two-car accident between Buddy Lazier and Laurent Redon. IRL officials' rejected an appeal from Tracy's team, and awarded the victory to Castroneves. Tracy has since maintained that he won the race.

When Team Green was renamed Andretti Green Racing and transferred to the rival IRL series for the 2003 season, Tracy signed a two-year contract to drive for Forsythe Racing to remain in CART from the 2003 CART championship in August 2002 since he was guaranteed to race for the team in 2004. (Note: The relationship between Green and Tracy cooled when news of his move to Team Players was reported in the press, which was conducted quietly during the hearing procedure for the appeal of the final result of the 2002 Indianapolis 500. The team invoked a clause in his contract forbidding him from discussing his plans by putting a gag order on him for the 2003 season until the conclusion of the 2002 championship to fine him $300,000 when the news was disclosed.) Tracy had negotiated with Newman/Haas Racing and Team Green before joining Forsythe. He took up cycling to lose weight and improve his fitness before the season began. Tracy won the season-opening Grand Prix of St. Petersburg after leading 71 of 105 laps. He led 69 of the 85 laps in the next Tecate/Telmex Grand Prix and won the Toyota Grand Prix of Long Beach to become the first Champ Car driver since Al Unser in 1971 to start the season with three consecutive victories. Despite qualifying on pole for the London Champ Car Trophy, three poor performances cost Tracy the championship lead at the Milwaukee Mile Centennial 250 to Bruno Junqueira. Tracy reclaimed the points lead with three straight podium finishes and pole position in Portland. He led the whole Molson Indy Toronto from pole position and a race-high 77 laps of the following Molson Indy Vancouver from another pole to become the first Canadian driver win two Canadian races in the same year. Tracy lost the championship lead to Junqueira again after crashing out in the Mario Andretti Grand Prix at Road America, which Junqueira won, but led 69 laps of the Champ Car Grand Prix of Mid-Ohio to win and reclaim the lead when Junqueira crashed. Following two top-ten finishes, he won the Gran Premio Telmex-Gigante from pole position after leading a race-high 64 laps. Tracy won his first CART championship and the Vanderbilt Cup by finishing 13th in the wet-weather Lexmark Indy 300, while Junqueira crashed with ten laps remaining.

=== 2004–2012 ===
When CART went bankrupt and was renamed the Champ Car World Series (CCWS), Tracy returned to drive Forsythe's renumbered No. 1 car for his championship defence in 2004, declaring his wish to not drive IRL cars he characterized as "crapwagons". Tracy was loyal to the CCWS, considering their cars better and found street circuits more of a challenge. He started third in the Toyota Grand Prix of Long Beach, the season's first race, and won after leading 78 laps. He finished in the top ten in three of the next five races and took pole in Cleveland. Tracy traded verbal jabs with driver Alex Tagliani, accusing him of impeding him for twelve laps in Portland and blaming him for causing a first-lap accident he was involved in Cleveland. His second victory of the season came at the Molson Indy Vancouver, where he led 81 of the 85 laps from pole position. The rest of the season saw a best finish of second at Denver, and four other top-tens for fourth in the drivers' standings with 254 points. (Note: Ten championship points were withheld from Tracy for criticizing race officials for not instructing Alex Tagliani to cease blocking him at Portland.)

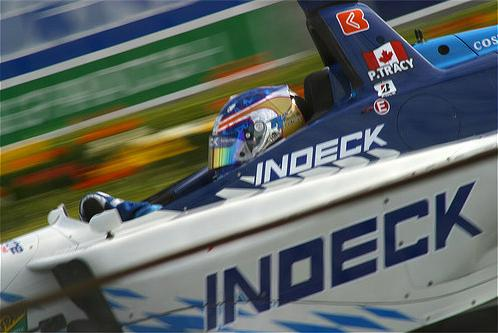
Tracy driving in the 2005 Toyota Grand Prix of Long Beach

Tracy returned to Forsythe for the 2005 season to drive the No. 3 car. He started on pole position at the season-opening Toyota Grand Prix of Long Beach and finished second. Two races later, in the Time Warner Cable Road Runner 225 at Milwaukee, he qualified fifth and led 192 of 225 laps to earn his fourth victory at the track. Tracy then won the Grand Prix of Cleveland from pole position, leading 46 of 91 laps and taking the championship lead from Sébastien Bourdais. He lost the points lead to Bourdais when his car ran out of fuel in the following Molson Indy Toronto after the two were involved in an unrelated collision at the pit lane exit. In the last seven races, he finished on the podium three times and took pole in Denver, where he led 59 laps before crashing. Tracy led a race-high 107 laps in the Hurricane Relief 400 at Las Vegas Motor Speedway before being hit in the rear by Bourdais, ending his race early. He placed fourth in the championship standings with 246 points.

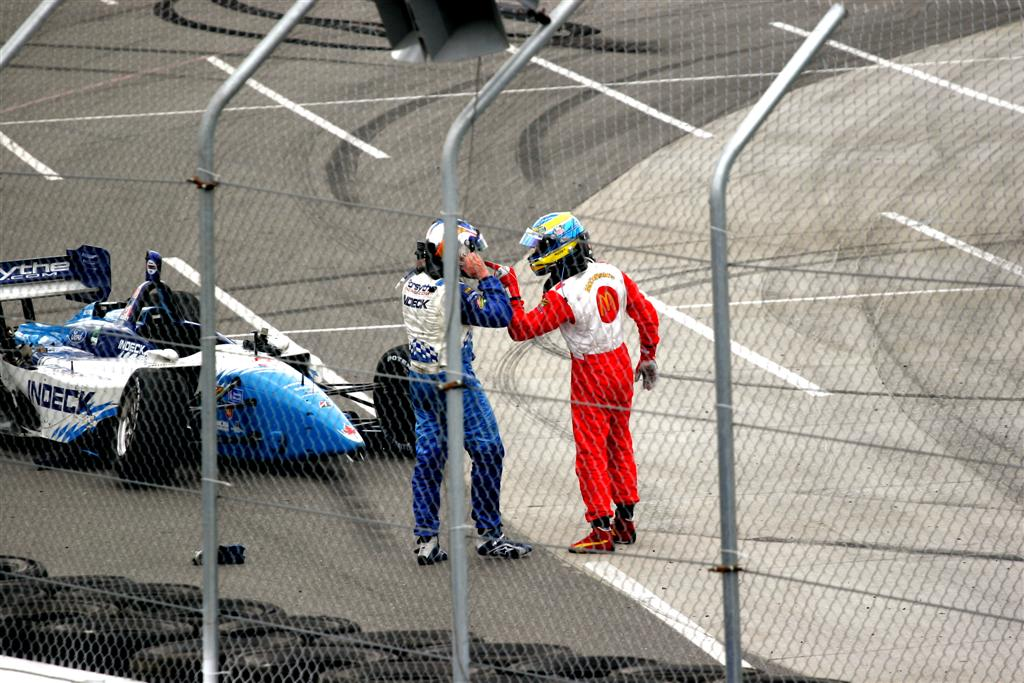
Sébastien Bourdais and Tracy were involved in a physical alteration after colliding on the final lap of the 2006 Grand Prix of Denver.

Tracy stayed with Forsythe for the 2006 season. His best finish of the season were three second places in each of the rounds held in Houston, Toronto and Montréal and achieved six more top-ten finishes in the thirteen races he entered in 2006. At the Grand Prix of San Jose, a collision between him and Tagliani caused by Tracy in third position reversing out of the turn six run-off area and into Tagliani's path led to a physical altercation on pit road. Tracy's sixth-place finish in the Grand Prix of Denver was overshadowed by another physical altercation, this time with Bourdais following a final-lap collision. Before the season-ending Gran Premio Telmex in Mexico City, he fractured his right shoulder blade in an ATV accident in Las Vegas and was replaced by Atlantic Championship driver David Martínez. (Note: A report by Autosport magazine that was carried by other North American publications stated that Tracy was injured while riding a golf cart over a sand trap. Tracy denied the report in an interview with journalist Dave Despain on the Speed Channel's WindTunnel with Dave Despain.) Tracy was seventh in the drivers' standings with 209 points. (Note: He was deducted seven championship points for his accident with Tagliani in San Jose and another three for his collision with Bourdais in Denver.)

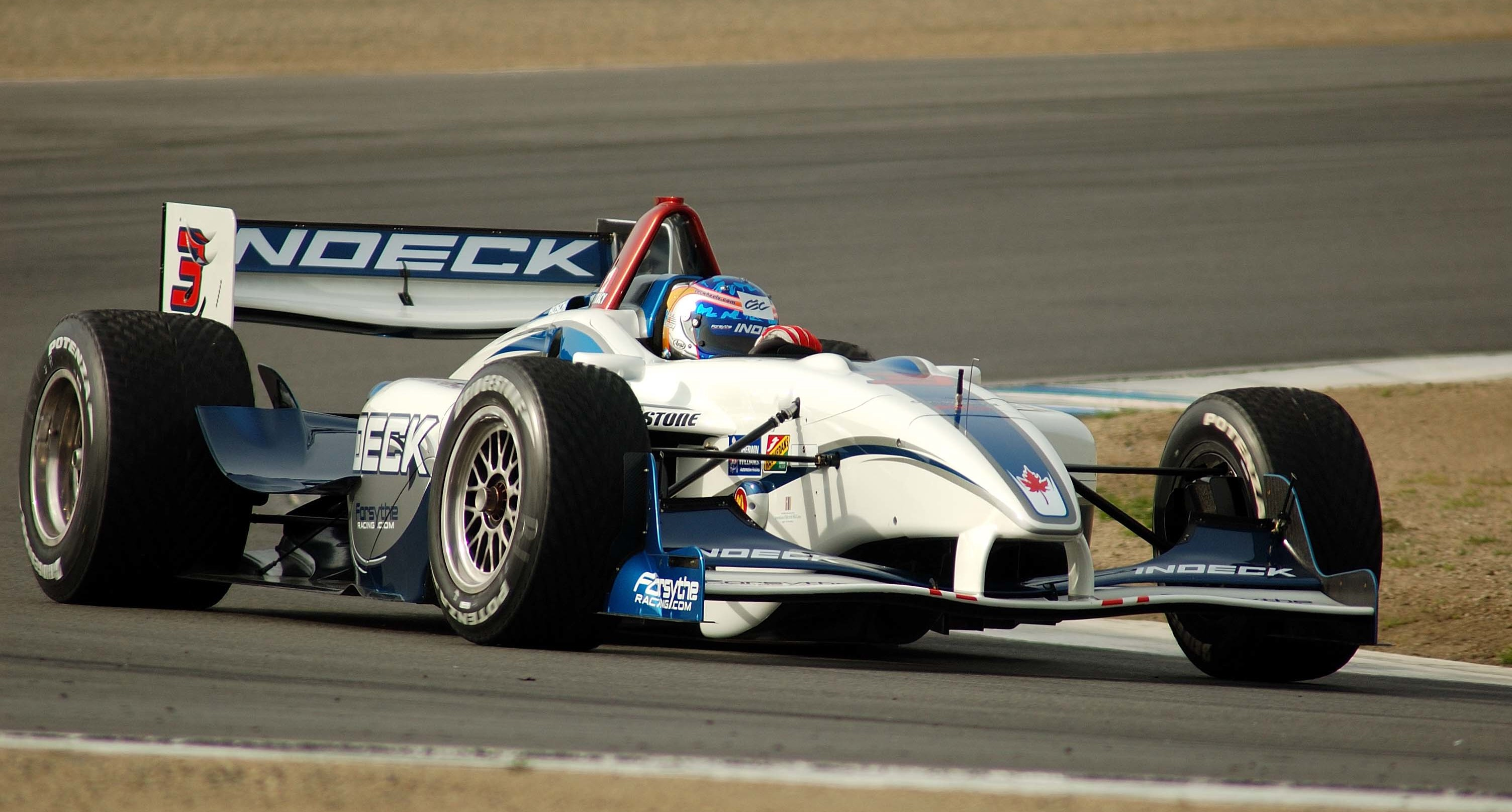
Tracy during pre-season testing for the 2007 Champ Car season

For the 2007 season, Tracy drove the new Panoz DP01-Cosworth car with Forsythe, but the team had trouble setting it up, trying to make it drive like a Lola, and Tracy found it difficult to acquaint himself with the Panoz. In May 2006, emboldened by rumours of an IRL-CCWS merger, Tracy signed a five-year extension, preferring open-wheel cars after pondering full-time stock car racing. After placing third in the season-opener in Las Vegas, he crashed backwards at low speed into a concrete barrier during practice for the Toyota Grand Prix of Long Beach, suffering a compression fracture to his first lumbar vertebrae and mild internal chest bleeding. Tracy was replaced by Servia for the next two races, and his preparation was limited before resuming competition in Portland. Tracy overcame separate crashes with Graham Rahal and Junqueira in the Grand Prix of Cleveland to win by leading the final 26 laps without stopping. The rest of the season yielded four top-ten finishes, including two fifth place finishes for eleventh in the championship rankings with 171 points.

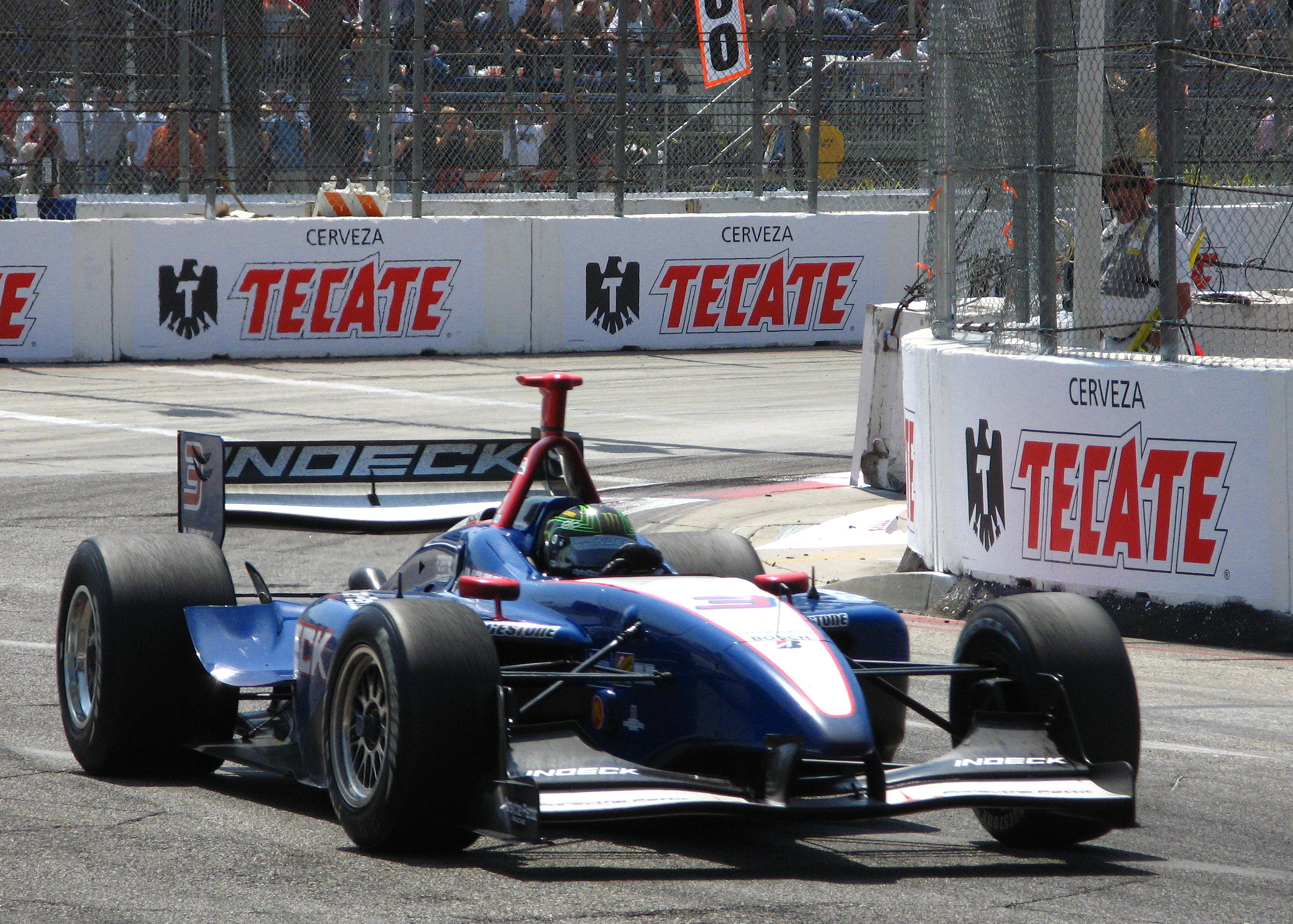
Tracy competed in the final Champ Car race, the 2008 Toyota Grand Prix of Long Beach

Tracy had to renegotiate his contract with Forsythe for the 2008 season or be fired. He agreed to stay with Forsythe after speaking with IRL chief Tony George about joining the IRL since he feared his CCWS seat was at risk. Following the unification of CCWS and the IRL in February 2008, Forsythe concentrated on the Atlantic Championship following the Toyota Grand Prix of Long Beach due to Gerald Forsythe's animosity towards George, while Tracy sought George's help in signing with a competitive IndyCar team. Tracy and Forsythe agreed for him to race in Long Beach despite a contract dispute over a stipulation that it field a car for him or let him race for another squad, (Note: After the season, Tracy sued Gerald Forsythe via the United States District Court for the Northern District of Illinois for claims of two breaches of his contract regarding payment of $2.3 million. Forsythe's motion to strike the allegations made in the case was denied.) finishing 11th. Following that, he made a one-time IRL entry at the Rexall Edmonton Indy driving Vision Racing's third car, the No. 22 Dallara-Honda run by Walker Racing after he was unable to run IndyCar's four road course races with the team. Tracy qualified 16th and finished fourth despite a pit-to-car radio issue. He made no more appearances with Vision Racing due to George's sponsorship problems.

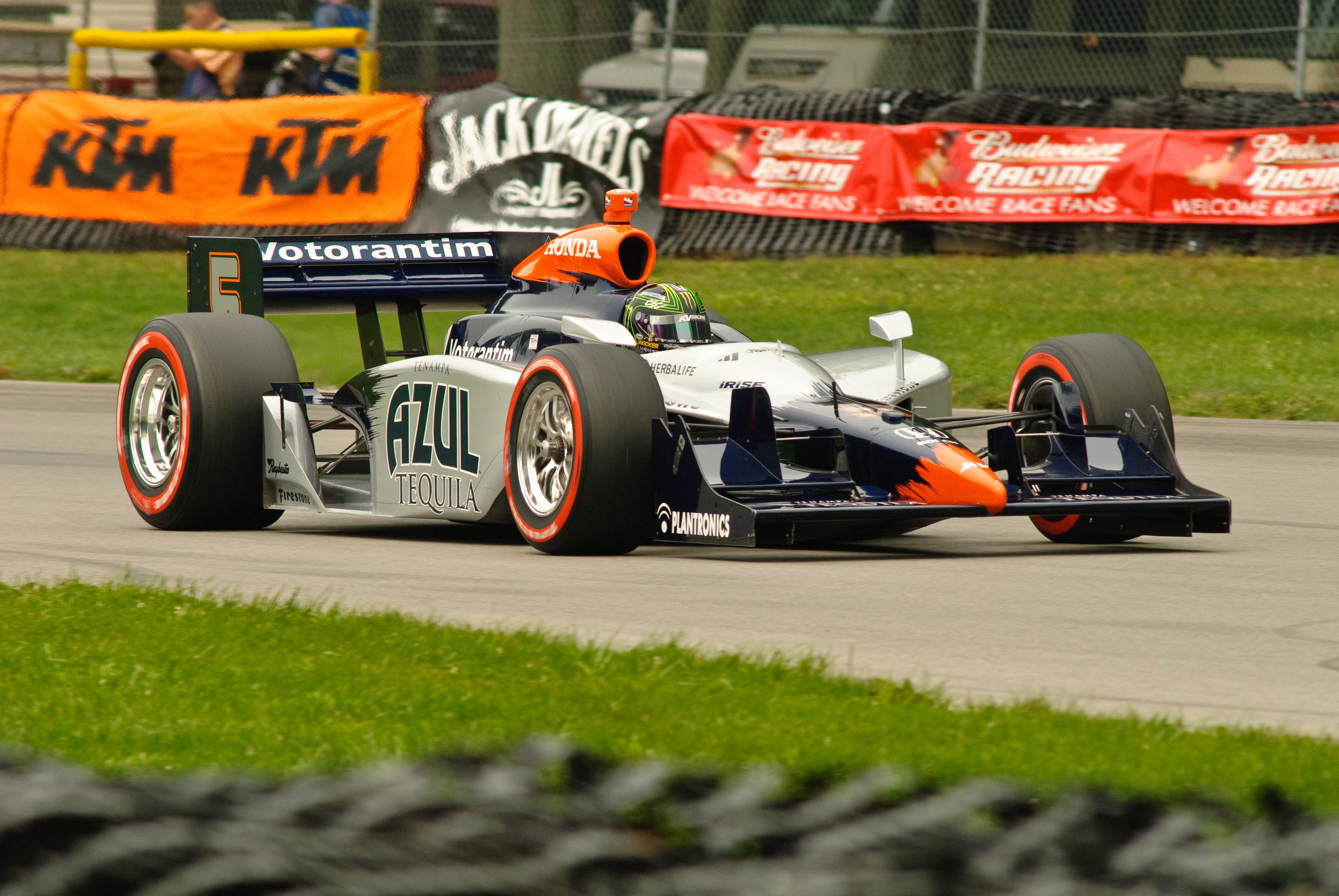
Tracy driving for KV Racing Technology at the 2009 Honda 200 at Mid-Ohio

With the Great Recession hurting IndyCar, Tracy entered six races in the 2009 season, five of which he drove KV Racing Technology's No. 15 Dallara-Honda (the Indianapolis 500, Watkins Glen, Toronto, and Edmonton) and later No. 5 car (Mid-Ohio), (Note: Tracy replaced Mario Moraes for this race because the latter was in Brazil following the death of his father.) after discussions with the team with assistance from industry friend Doug Barnett to get him sponsorship to race for the team. Tracy also drove A. J. Foyt Racing's No. 14 car at Milwaukee in place of the injured Vítor Meira after talking to team director Larry Foyt but left the team following the race because it provided him with sub-par equipment. He finished in the top-ten in three races, including a season-best sixth place in Edmonton.

Tracy continued to race part-time in IndyCar in the 2010 season. He entered three races (the Indianapolis 500, Toronto and Edmonton) with KV Racing Technology in its No. 15 car with sponsorship funding, and another three events (Watkins Glen, Kentucky and Motegi) for Dreyer & Reinbold Racing as a substitute driver for the injured Mike Conway in its No. 24 entry. Tracy lost 35 lb (16 kg) in eight weeks by cycling and embarked on a diet for two months after seeing footage of himself recording a television program to get more physically fit for the season. He did not qualify for the Indianapolis 500 because his car was slow and race strategist Barry Green deleted the time in vain, expecting Tracy to drive faster. Tracy's best finish of the season was sixth place at Edmonton.

Tracy signed a five-year sponsorship deal and was due to drive full-time with KV Racing Technology-Lotus in the 2011 championship, but sponsorship funding from driver Tony Kanaan shortly before the season began in St. Petersburg meant he was dropped from the team. Tracy instead accepted a five-race deal with Dragon Racing after being sought out by team owner Jay Penske when the team lost Kanaan due to sponsorship issues, and he also joined Dreyer & Reinbold for the Indianapolis 500. He finished each of the six races held outside of the top-ten places. Tracy was involved in a fifteen-car accident that killed Dan Wheldon at the season-ending IZOD IndyCar World Championship in Las Vegas.

Tracy started talking to some racing teams since he wanted to drive full-time in IndyCar for the 2012 season, not part-time, otherwise he would not compete. Tracy was close to signing a contract to drive a Dallara DW12 car for Michael Shank Racing (MSR) but the team could not get enough financial backing to enter the season-opening Honda Grand Prix of St. Petersburg, preventing him from participating in his final planned season. He chose to stop racing following Wheldon's death.

== Other racing ventures ==
Tracy tested the Benetton Formula team's B194 F1 car at the Circuito do Estoril in September 1994, at the invitation of F1 commercial rights owner Bernie Ecclestone, who sought to bring a CART driver to F1 as other F1 drivers had transferred to the highly popular CART championship. (Note: Benetton team principal Flavio Briatore wanted Tracy to sign a contract that would make him Tracy's manager for the rest of the driver's career but Tracy told Briatore that he would not sign the contract. Briatore prevented Tracy from testing for his team until an intervention from Ecclestone.) He did well in the test but declined Benetton's three-year testing contract because there was no guarantee of racing or adequate pay.

In 2005, Tracy made his Rolex Sports Car Series debut in the 24 Hours of Daytona with Kodak-Bell Motorsports. (Note: He was reported to be entering the 1992 24 Hours of Daytona with the All American Racers team and he would have shared an Eagle MkIII-Toyota with Juan Manuel Fangio II and Andy Wallace.) Sharing the No. 54 Doran JE4-Pontiac Daytona Prototype (DP) car with Forest Barber, Terry Borcheller, Christian Fittipaldi and Ralf Kelleners, their car started fifteenth and finished 49th overall after retiring with an oil leak. The following year, he returned to participate in the season-opening 24 Hours of Daytona for MSR in the No. 6 Riley MkXI-Lexus with Mike Borkowski, Paul Mears Jr., and Ken Wilden. They were classified 54th after overheating problems. Tracy and Borkowski finished third in the following Mexico City 400km and was sixth with Borkowski and Tommy Constantine in the Brumos Porsche 250. In 2007, Tracy shared MSR's No. 6 Riley-Lexus with A. J. Allmendinger, Ian James and Henri Zogaib in the 24 Hours of Daytona. Their car had mechanical issues and finished 16th in class and 26th overall.

Tracy began competing in NASCAR's Busch Series in the No. 34 Chevrolet Monte Carlo for five races in the 2006 season with Frank Cicci Racing and Jim Kelly Racing that were not on the same weekend as any CCWS rounds. This was done in the hope he would compete full-time in either the Busch or Nextel Cup Series in 2007. (Note: Tracy tested a Cup Series car over two days with Richard Childress Racing at Michigan International Raceway in August 2005 in anticipation he would compete in the GFS Marketplace 400. An agreement of a race seat was not reached because of inadequate time to prepare an entry for him. Before that, Tracy and car owner Richard Childress had communicated for two years about a test, and acquainted himself with stock car racing by renting a former Nextel Cup Series car that was prepared by driving instructor Andy Hillenburg at Concord Speedway.) Tracy exhibited an interest in NASCAR as early as 1999, and Barnett helped him secure finance. Funding was raised for Tracy to enter ten races but Forsythe wanted him to do five. He also drove Biagi Brothers Racing's No. 4 Dodge Charger in the Telcel-Motorola 200 at Mexico City. Tracy had his season-best finish of 24th at the season-opening Hershey's Kissables 300 at Daytona International Speedway, after starting fortieth. He planned to race for Riley-D'Hondt Motorsports in six races of the 2007 Busch Series with the possibility of driving the Car of Tomorrow in the Nextel Cup Series but instead focused on his CCWS career.

Tracy drove one Craftsman Truck Series race in Germain Racing's No. 9 Toyota Tundra late in the 2008 season (the Chevy Silverado 350K at Texas). He impressed team owner Bob Germain enough at Chicagoland Speedway in Todd Bodine's truck to sign a one-race contract, and raced in Texas rather than Las Vegas as intended, due to a Texas-based sponsor's intervention. Tracy started 22nd and finished twentieth. In the 2012 Rolex Sports Car Series, Tracy drove four races for Doran Racing in its No. 77 Dallara DP01-Ford with Brian Frisselle, Burt Frisselle, Jim Lowe and Billy Johnson and two for Action Express Racing in its No. 5 Chevrolet Corvette DP alongside David Donohue. His best finish of the season was third place in the Montreal 200. Tracy partnered Jon Bennett, Colin Braun and Lowe in Doran's No. 77 Dallara-Ford car in the 2013 24 Hours of Daytona, finishing 48th overall after he collided with Simon Pagenaud in the tenth hour.

Between 2013 and 2016, Tracy raced five rounds of the Stadium Super Trucks short course off-road racing series in Toronto. Tracy finished in the top ten in four of the five races, with his best series performance of fourth in the second 2014 Toronto event. (Note: Attributed to multiple sources:) In 2016, he and co-driver Gary Moore won the B category of the Sportscar Vintage Racing Association's Indy Legends Charity Pro–Am race at Indianapolis in a 1965 Ford Mustang GT350. He drove two rounds of the Trans-Am Series at Road Atlanta and Indianapolis in Coleman Motorsports's No. 87 Chevrolet Camaro after being invited to enter a race during the 2018 season. Tracy finished seventh at Road Atlanta and 20th at Indianapolis. He contested the Bathurst 12 Hour for the first time in 2019 on the recommendation of NBC Sports commentator Leigh Diffey as a replacement for the injured Boris Said. Tracy shared the MARC Cars Australia's No. 91 MARC Ford Mustang II with Keith Kassulke, Paul Morris and Anton de Pasquale in the Invitational category and retired after 189 laps with engine failure.

Tracy replaced Eric Curran as William Hubbell's co-driver in a Prestige Performance/Wayne Taylor Racing-entered Pro-Am category Lamborghini Huracán Super Trofeo EVO in the Lamborghini Super Trofeo North America round at Watkins Glen. Tracy finished fourteenth in the first race and fifteenth in the second. He returned to the Trans-Am Series in the TA2 category for the 2020 season, driving the No. 81 3-Dimensional Services Group Ford Mustang at the Circuit of the Americas round, replacing Doug Peterson. Tracy was disqualified from the race by the stewards for two illegal manoeuvres. He was invited to drive in the Mercedes-Benz category of the season-ending round of the SC Súper Copa at the Autódromo Miguel E. Abed in Pubela. Tracy was twelfth in the first race and ninth in the second.

In 2021, Tracy began competing in the Superstar Racing Experience (SRX) short track racing series, and was involved in numerous accidents and altercations with other drivers. Tracy finished in the top ten in four out of six races with a best finish of fifth at both Eldora Speedway and Nashville Fairgrounds Speedway for seventh in the drivers' standings with 121 points. During the 2022 season, he took his first podium finish in SRX finishing third at Stafford Motor Speedway. Tracy was sixth in the final championship standings with 118 points. He was suspended from SRX competition on July 28, 2023, following a five-car accident he started in the 2023 season's third round at Pulaski County Motorsports Park. Tracy did not return to SRX for the rest of the season.

Tracy accepted an invitation from the NASCAR Brasil Series to compete in the Autódromo Velo Città round of the 2023 NASCAR Brasil Sprint Race. Tracy won the first race, his first auto racing victory since 2007. He made his second appearance in the Bathurst 12 Hour in 2024 alongside Geoff Emery, Daniel Stutterd and Max Twigg in sharing TekworkX's Invitational-category IRC GT car, finishing second in class despite damaging the car in wet conditions. Tracy drove the No. 10 Race Cars for You IRC GT vehicle in the XGT category for the opening two rounds of the 2025 Trans-Am Series, winning in his class at Sebring International Raceway.

== Driving style ==
Tracy has had an aggressive driving style from childhood, which he carried over into CART and was noted for his car control. By the 1999 season, he had learned to moderate his aggressiveness by learning when to make moves and so had fewer accidents. Sports car driver Ron Fellows observed that Tracy had learnt some of his technique in Europe and likened his karting style to Fittipaldi and Senna. He has a propensity for sliding a car into a turn with the rear-end out, which he has desired since he started kart racing. Tracy was known by fans for driving his car in places that most drivers did not consider, and he frequently crashed as a result. From 1994 until 2002, he employed a traction control device, an illegal electronic driver aid, to reduce tyre wear for greater drive-ability, but he was not allowed to reveal this knowledge for fear of repercussions from his team owner and engine manufacturer.

== Public image, other ventures and recognition ==
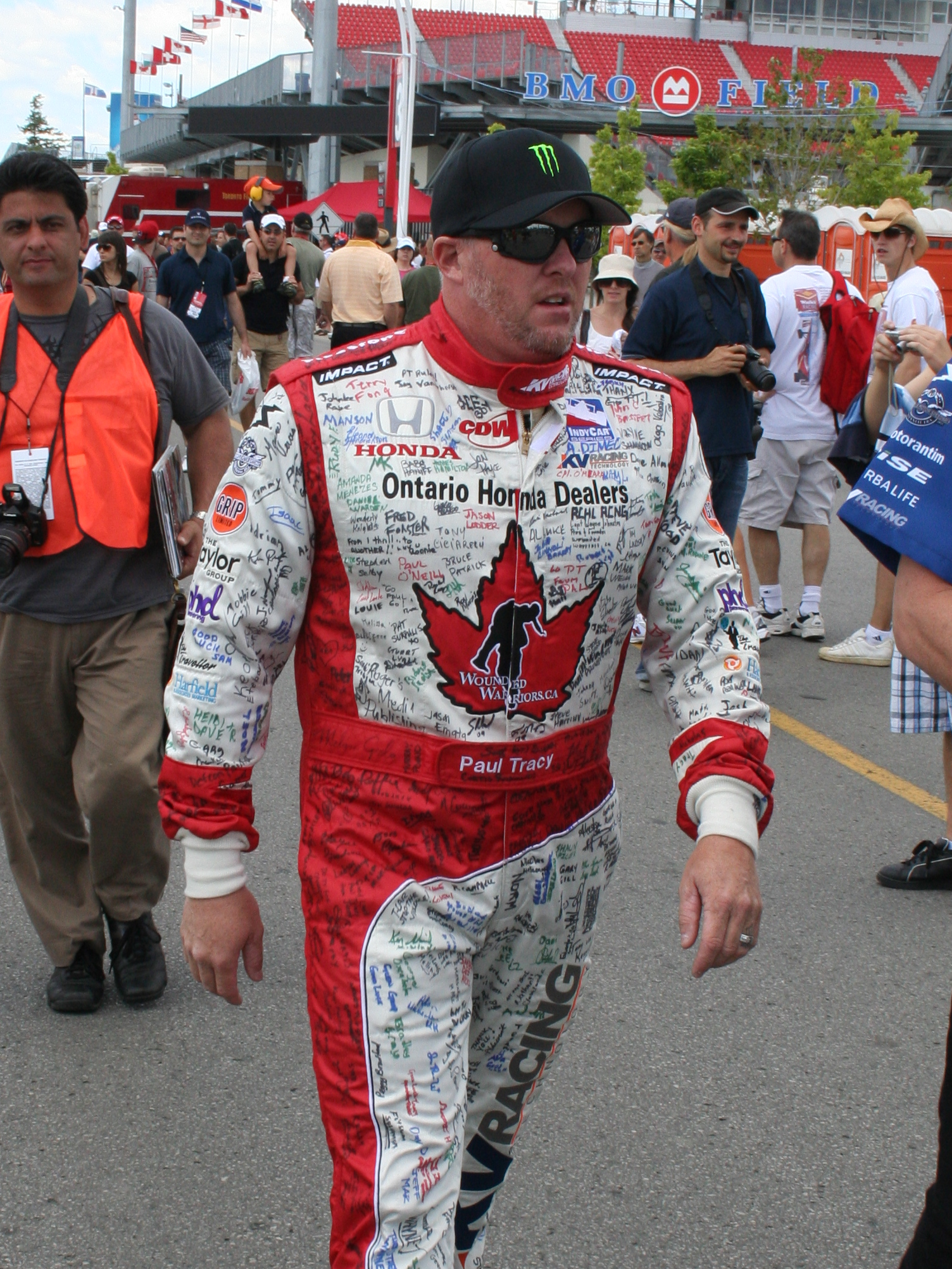
Tracy is an outspoken figure in the open-wheel racing world

Nicknamed the "Thrill from West Hill" after his 1993 Toronto CART victory for his aggressive driving style and his "Bad Boy" image, Tracy is outspoken, speaking his mind about issues. Bruce Martin, writing for NBC Sports, wrote that the driver "became a crowd favorite because of his highly aggressive racing style and the fact he was intimidating on the racetrack", but his driving saw him put on probation as well as fined multiple times by CART. Toronto Life magazine characterised him as the "strip club-attending rogue is the McEnroe of racing, perpetually battling the powers that be over some alleged infraction or other." CART and media outlets utilized his image to promote the series. Author Paul Ferris observed that some CART fans liked Tracy because he appeared to be "a regular guy" who had the "lack of a classic athletic physique, and his penchant for displaying flashes of temper along with a well-timed jab at a driver who has wronged him."

Tracy had a supporting role on an episode of the 1980s television programme The Littlest Hobo, and was a guest on the November 7, 2003 episode of the Late Show with David Letterman. He appeared in 13 episodes of the 2010 Speed competition series Battle of the Supercars. Tracy analysed IndyCar races for Canadian broadcaster Sportsnet during the 2013 season, before joining NBCSN's IndyCar Series broadcast team in the same role from the 2014 season. The producers permitted him to broadcast his racing opinions without using profanity or dumbing-down, and his presence was attributed in part to an increase in NBCSN ratings. Tracy was investigated by NBC Sports in late 2018 for allegedly posting a racist comment about immigrants on social media, but it cleared him after determining that he was not the author. He also worked as an NBCSN analyst at the 24 Hours of Daytona, before gradually reducing his broadcasting role owing to his SRX commitments and leaving the network after the 2021 season when his contract was not renewed.

In 1990, Tracy was awarded All-American status by the American Racing Writers' and Broadcasters Association "for his performance in the support/development series for the PPG Indy Car World Series." He received the Bruce McLaren Trophy from the British Racing Drivers' Club as "the British Commonwealth's most promising driver" in 1990, and was named the Canadian Racing Drivers' Association Driver of the Year in 1991. Tracy was named to CART's All-Star Team for both 1999 and 2000 and was voted the series' Most Improved Driver of 1999. He was voted CART's Most Popular Driver of 2002 and 2003. He is an inductee of the Long Beach Motorsports Walk of Fame (2013), the Canadian Motorsport Hall of Fame (2014), the Road to Indy Hall of Fame (2015), and the Ontario Sports Hall of Fame (2025). Tracy received an honorary diploma from Fanshawe College in November 2016. Paul Ferriss wrote a biography of him, Never Too Fast: The Paul Tracy Story, which was published in 2001.

Tracy has done business with companies such as Goodyear, General Motors Canada, Molson, Snap-On Tools, No Fear, Yeti Cycles, and Spy Sunglasses. Tracy is the owner of the Harley-Davidson motorcycle parts and apparel firm Black Label Baggers. He was part of Team Green's and African American mentoring organization 100 Black Men of America's program to donate money to buy computers for youngsters in urban areas for better accessibility to technology based on his performance in five races in 2001. In 2007, Tracy joined a three-year campaign run by the Ontario Safety League against street racing in the Greater Toronto Area, and at the 2009 Edmonton Indy, raised awareness of the Wounded Warriors Canada non-profit charity that supports wounded Canadian troops overseas.

== Personal life ==
Tracy has been married three times: he married nursing student and high school sweetheart Tara Cormier on February 13, 1993, Liisa Hunter in mid-April 1998, and finally Patty Faraci in April 2005. He has two children from his first marriage. Tracy is a dual Canadian-American citizen. He maintains a collection of power boats, classic cars and motorcycles.

== Motorsports results ==
=== American open–wheel racing results ===
(key)

==== American Racing Series ====
American Racing Series results
Year	Team	1	2	3	4	5	6	7	8	9	10	11	12	13	14	Rank	Points	Ref
1988	Hemelgarn Racing	PHX; 1	MIL; 15	POR; 4	CLE; 11	TOR; 14	MEA; 13	POC	MOH; 5	ROA; 14	NAZ; 6	LAG; 8	MIA; 14			**9th**	**58**	
1989	Maple Leaf Racing	PHX; 2	LBH; 13	MIL; 14	DET; 11	POR; 2	MEA; 4	TOR; 16	POC; 12	MOH; 3	ROA; 10	NAZ; 15	LAG			**8th**	**65**	
1990	Landford Racing	PHX; 1	**LBH**; 1	MIL; 1	**DET**; 8	**POR**; 1	**CLE**; 1	**MEA**; 1	TOR; 1	DEN; 15	**VAN**; 5	MOH; 1	ROA; 1	NAZ; 10	**LAG**; 12	**1st**	**214**	

==== CART/Champ Car ====
CART / Champ Car Series results
Year	Team	No.	Chassis	Engine	1	2	3	4	5	6	7	8	9	10	11	12	13	14	15	16	17	18	19	20	21	Rank	Points	Ref
1991	Dale Coyne Racing	39	Lola T90/00	Cosworth DFS V8 t	SRF	LBH; 22	PHX	INDY	MIL	DET	POR	CLE	MDW	TOR												21st	6	
1991	Penske Racing	17	Penske PC-19	Chevrolet 265A V8 t											MCH; 21	DEN	VAN	MOH	ROA	NAZ; 7	LAG; 25					21st	6	
1992	Penske Racing	7	Penske PC-20	Chevrolet 265A V8 t	SRF	PHX; 4	LBH	INDY; 20																		12th	59	
1992	Penske Racing	7	Penske PC-21	Chevrolet 265B V8 t					DET; 16	POR	MIL	NHA	TOR; 21	MCH; 2	CLE; 19	**ROA**; 17	VAN; 23	MOH; 2	NAZ; 3	LAG; 16						12th	59	
1993	Penske Racing	12	Penske PC-22	Chevrolet 265C V8 t	SRF; 21	PHX; 16	LBH; 1	INDY; 30	MIL; 20	DET; 9	POR; 3	**CLE**; 1	TOR; 1	MCH; 19	NHA; 2	**ROA**; 1	VAN; 13	MOH; 25	NAZ; 3	LAG; 1						3rd	157	
1994	Penske Racing	3	Penske PC-23	Ilmor 265D V8 t	SRF; 16	**PHX**; 23	**LBH**; 20		MIL; 3	DET; 1	POR; 3	CLE; 3	TOR; 5	MCH; 16	MOH; 2	NHA; 2	VAN; 20	**ROA**; 18	NAZ; 1	**LAG**; 1						3rd	152	
1994	Penske Racing	3	Penske PC-23	Mercedes-Benz 500I V8 t				INDY; 23																		3rd	152	
1995	Newman/Haas Racing	3	Lola T95/00	Ford XB V8 t	MIA; 27	SRF; 1	PHX; 4	LBH; 28	NAZ; 26	INDY; 24	MIL; 1	DET; 8	POR; 18	ROA; 2	TOR; 8	CLE; 26	MCH; 23	MOH; 2	NHA; 23	VAN; 8	LAG; 2					6th	115	
1996	Penske Racing	3	Penske PC-25	Mercedes-Benz IC108C V8 t	**MIA**; 23	RIO; 19	SRF; 22	LBH; 4	**NAZ**; 5	U.S. 7	**MIL**; 3	DET; 17	POR; 27	CLE; 9	TOR; 5	MCH; Wth	MOH	ROA; 12	VAN; 18	LAG; 29						13th	60	
1997	Penske Racing	3	Penske PC-26	Mercedes-Benz IC108D V8 t	MIA; 2	SRF; 19	LBH; 7	**NAZ**; 1	RIO; 1	GAT; 1	**MIL**; 6	DET; DNS	POR; 7	CLE; 7	TOR; 10	MCH; 4	MOH; 27	ROA; 28	VAN; 28	LAG; 26	FON; 26					5th	121	
1998	Team KOOL Green	26	Reynard 98i	Honda HRK V8 t	MIA; 27	MOT; 5	LBH; 25	NAZ; 5	RIO; 25	GAT; 26	MIL; 7	DET; 7	POR; 28	CLE; 19	TOR; 14	MCH; 9	MOH; 5	ROA; 6	VAN; 11	LAG; 8	HOU; 20	SRF; 23	FON; 14			13th	61	
1999	Team KOOL Green	26	Reynard 99i	Honda HRS V8 t	MIA	MOT; 11	LBH; 21	NAZ; 3	RIO; 15	GAT; 19	MIL; 1	POR; 5	CLE; 4	ROA; 11	TOR; 2	MCH; 3	DET; 2	MOH; 2	CHI; 23	VAN; 18	LAG; 4	HOU; 1	SRF; 7	FON; 18		3rd	161	
2000	Team KOOL Green	26	Reynard 2Ki	Honda HR-0 V8 t	MIA; 3	LBH; 1	RIO; 3	MOT; 6	NAZ; 10	MIL; 15	DET; 20	POR; 18	CLE; 19	TOR; 3	**MCH**; 7	CHI; 19	MOH; 16	ROA; 1	VAN; 1	LAG; 11	GAT; 18	HOU; 4	SRF; 17	FON; 24		5th	134	
2001	Team KOOL Green	26	Reynard 01i	Honda HR-1 V8 t	MTY; 3	LBH; 4	TXS; NH	NAZ; 3	MOT; 18	MIL; 24	DET; 14	POR; 21	CLE; 24	TOR; 6	MCH; 7	CHI; 12	MOH; 4	ROA; 26	VAN; 26	LAU; 10	ROC; 6	HOU; 24	LAG; 18	SRF; 14	FON; 24	14th	73	
2002	Team KOOL Green	26	Reynard 02i	Honda HR-2 V8 t	MTY; 8	LBH; 7																				11th	101	
2002	Team KOOL Green	26	Lola B02/00	Honda HR-2 V8 t			MOT; 19	MIL; 1*	LAG; 17	POR; 17	CHI; 9	TOR; 16	CLE; 3	VAN; 2*	MOH; 18	ROA; 13*	MTL; 4	DEN; 8	ROC; 19	MIA; 12	SRF; 3	FON; 17	MXC; 16			11th	101	
2003	Player's Forsythe Racing	3	Lola B02/00	Ford XFE V8 t	STP; 1*	MTY; 1*	LBH; 1	**BRH**; 17	LAU; 12	MIL; 12	LAG; 3	**POR**; 2*	CLE; 2*	**TOR**; 1*	**VAN**; 1*	ROA; 15	**MOH**; 1*	MTL; 6	DEN; 4	MIA; 16	**MXC**; 1*	SRF; 13	FON; NH			1st	226	
2004	Forsythe Championship Racing	1	Lola B02/00	Ford XFE V8 t	LBH; 1*	MTY; 7	MIL; 17	POR; 3	**CLE**; 17	TOR; 5	**VAN**; 1*	ROA; 12	DEN; 2*	MTL; 4	LAG; 10	LAS; 18	**SRF**; 4*	MXC; 10								4th	254	
2005	Forsythe Championship Racing	3	Lola B02/00	Ford XFE V8 t	**LBH**; 2	MTY; 15	MIL; 1	POR; 3	**CLE**; 1	TOR; 16	EDM; 3	SJO; 2	**DEN**; 16	MTL; 8	LSV; 17	SRF; 17	MXC; 3									4th	246	
2006	Forsythe Championship Racing	3	Lola B02/00	Ford XFE V8 t	LBH; 17	HOU; 2	MTY; 4	MIL; 16	POR; 7	CLE; 16	TOR; 2	EDM; 5	SJO; 15	DEN; 6	MTL; 2	ROA; 10	SRF; 4	MXC								7th	209	
2007	Forsythe Championship Racing	3	Panoz DP01	Cosworth XFE V8 t	LSV; 3	LBH; Wth	HOU	POR; 10	CLE; 1	MTT; 15	TOR; 14	EDM; 5	SJO; 11	ROA; 12	ZOL; 10	ASN; 17	SRF; 9	MXC; 5								11th	171	

==== IndyCar Series ====
IndyCar Series results
Year	Team	No.	Chassis	Engine	1	2	3	4	5	6	7	8	9	10	11	12	13	14	15	16	17	18	19	Rank	Points	Ref
2002	Team Green	26	Dallara IR-02	Chevrolet Indy V8	HMS	PHX	FON	NAZ	INDY; 2	TXS	PPIR	RIR	KAN	NSH	MCH	KTY	GAT	CHI	TX2					34th	40	
2008	Forsythe/Pettit Racing	3	Panoz DP01	Cosworth XFE V8 t	HMS	STP	MOT^{1} DNP	LBH^{1} 11	KAN	INDY	MIL	TXS	IOW	RIR	WGL	NSH	MOH							**33rd**	**51**	
2008	Vision Racing	22	Dallara IR-05	Honda HI7R V8														EDM; 4	KTY	SNM	DET	CHI	SRF^{2}	**33rd**	**51**	
2009	KV Racing Technology	15	Dallara IR-05	Honda HI7R V8	STP	LBH	KAN	INDY; 9					WGL; 20	TOR; 19	EDM; 6	KTY								23rd	113	
2009	KV Racing Technology	5	Dallara IR-05	Honda HI7R V8													MOH; 7	SNM	CHI	MOT	HMS			23rd	113	
2009	A. J. Foyt Enterprises	14	Dallara IR-05	Honda HI7R V8					MIL; 17	TXS	IOW	RIR												23rd	113	
2010	KV Racing Technology	15	Dallara IR-05	Honda HI7R V8	SAO	STP	ALA	LBH	KAN	INDY; DNQ	TXS	IOW		TOR; 13	EDM; 6	MOH	SNM	CHI						27th	91	
2010	Dreyer & Reinbold Racing	24	Dallara IR-05	Honda HI7R V8									WGL; 14						KTY; 12	MOT; 22	HMS			27th	91	
2011	Dragon Racing	8	Dallara IR-05	Honda HI7R V8	STP	ALA	LBH; 16	SAO		TXS1; 12	TXS2; 13	MIL	IOW	TOR; 16	EDM; 26	MOH	NHM	SNM	BAL	MOT	KTY	LVS^{3} C		**29th**	**68**	
2011	Dreyer & Reinbold Racing	23	Dallara IR-05	Honda HI7R V8					INDY; 25															**29th**	**68**	

^{1} Run on same day.
^{2} Non-points-paying, exhibition race.
^{3} The Las Vegas Indy 300 was abandoned after Dan Wheldon died from injuries sustained in a 15-car crash on lap 11.

==== Indianapolis 500 ====
Year	Chassis	Engine	Start	Finish	Team
1992	Penske PC-21	Chevrolet B	19	20	Penske Racing
1993	Penske PC-22	Chevrolet C	7	30	Penske Racing
1994	Penske PC-23	Ilmor-Mercedes	25	23	Penske Racing
1995	Lola T9500	Ford-Cosworth XB	16	24	Newman/Haas Racing
2002	Dallara	Chevrolet	29	2	Team Green
2009	Dallara	Honda	13	9	KV Racing Technology
2010	Dallara	Honda	DNQ		KV Racing Technology
2011	Dallara	Honda	25	25	Dreyer & Reinbold Racing

=== Sports car racing ===
==== Can-Am ====
Can-Am Series results
Year	Team	1	2	3	4	Rank	Points	Ref
1986	Horst Kroll Racing	MOS1	SUM	GAT	**MOS2**; 1	**8th**	**20**	

==== Grand-Am Rolex Sports Car Series ====
(key) (Races in bold indicate pole position, Results are overall/class)

Grand-Am Rolex Sports Car Series results
Year	Team	Make	Engine	Class	1	2	3	4	5	6	7	8	9	10	11	12	13	14	15	Rank	Points	Ref
2005	Kodak-Bell Motorsports	Doran	Pontiac	DP	DAY; **49/23**	HOM	CAL	LAG	CMT	WAT	DAY	BAR	WAT	MOH	PHX	WAT	VIR	MEX		133rd	8	
2006	Michael Shank Racing	Riley	Lexus	DP	DAY; **54/27**	MEX; **3/3**	HOM	LBH	VIR	LAG	PHX	LRP	WAT1	DAY2; **4/4**	BAR	WAT2	INF	MIL		**63rd**	**59**	
2007	Michael Shank Racing	Riley	Lexus	DP	DAY; **26/16**	MEX	HOM	VIR	LAG	LRP	WAT1	MOH	DAY2	IOWA	CGV	BAR	WAT2	INF	MIL	**71st**	**15**	
2012	Doran Racing	Dallara	Ford	DP	DAY; **7/7**	BAR	HOM	NJ; **21/8**	BIP	MOH	RA	WAT1; **10/10**	IMS; **16/6**	WAT2						**15th**	**145**	
2012	Action Express Racing	Chevrolet	Corvette	DP											CGV; **3/3**	LAG; **9/9**	LRP			**15th**	**145**	
2013	Doran Racing	Dallara	Riley	DP	DAY; **48/17**	COA	BAR	ATL	DET	MOH	WAT	IMS	ELK	KAN	LAG	LRP				79th	16	

==== 24 Hours of Daytona ====
Year	Class	No.	Team	Car	Engine	Co-drivers	Laps	Position	Class Pos.	Ref
2005	DP	54	(United States) Kodak-Bell Motorsports	Doran	Pontiac	(United States) Terry Borcheller (Brazil) Christian Fittipaldi (United States) Forest Barber (Germany) Ralf Kelleners	328	49 ^{DNF}	27 ^{DNF}	
2006	DP	6	(United States) Michael Shank Racing	Riley	Lexus	(United States) Paul Mears Jr. (United States) Mike Borkowski (Canada) Ken Wilden	168	54 ^{DNF}	23 ^{DNF}	
2007	DP	6	(United States) Michael Shank Racing	Riley	Lexus	(United States) A. J. Allmendinger (United States) Henri Zogaib (United States) Ian James	595	26	16	
2012	DP	77	(United States) Doran Racing	Dallara DP01	Ford 5.0L V8	(United States) Jim Lowe (United States) Burt Frisselle (United States) Brian Frisselle (United States) Billy Johnson	748	7	7	
2013	DP	77	(United States) Doran Racing	Dallara	Riley	(United States) Jon Bennett (United States) Colin Braun (United States) Jim Lowe	286	48 ^{DNF}	17 ^{DNF}	

=== NASCAR ===
(key) (Bold – Pole position awarded by qualifying time. Italics – Pole position earned by points standings or practice time. * – Most laps led.)

==== Busch Series ====
NASCAR Busch Series results
Year	Team	No.	Make	1	2	3	4	5	6	7	8	9	10	11	12	13	14	15	16	17	18	19	20	21	22	23	24	25	26	27	28	29	30	31	32	33	34	35	NBGNC	Pts	Ref
2006	Frank Cicci Racing	34	Chevy	DAY; 24	CAL		LVS; 36	ATL	BRI	TEX	NSH	PHO	TAL; 35	RCH	DAR	CLT	DOV	NSH	KEN	MLW	DAY; 28	CHI	NHA	MAR	GTY	IRP	GLN	MCH	BRI	CAL; 42	RCH	DOV	KAN	CLT	MEM	TEX	PHO	HOM	76th	372	
2006	Biagi Brothers Racing	4	Dodge			MXC; 37																																	76th	372	

==== Craftsman Truck Series ====
NASCAR Craftsman Truck Series results
Year	Team	No.	Make	1	2	3	4	5	6	7	8	9	10	11	12	13	14	15	16	17	18	19	20	21	22	23	24	25	NCTSC	Pts	Ref
2008	Germain Racing	9	Toyota	DAY	CAL	ATL	MAR	KAN	CLT	MFD	DOV	TEX	MCH	MLW	MEM	KEN	IRP	NSH	BRI	GTW	NHA	LVS	TAL	MAR	ATL	TEX; 20	PHO	HOM	84th	103	

=== Stadium Super Trucks ===
(key) (Bold – Pole position. Italics – Fastest qualifier. * – Most laps led.)

Stadium Super Trucks results
Year	1	2	3	4	5	6	7	8	9	10	11	12	13	14	15	16	17	18	19	20	21	22	SSTC	Pts	Ref
2013	PHO	LBH	LAN	SDG	SDG	STL	TOR	**TOR**; 7	CRA	CRA	OCF	OCF	OCF	CPL									26th	14	
2014	STP	STP	LBH	IMS	IMS	DET	DET	DET	AUS	TOR; 6	TOR; 4	OCF	OCF	CSS	LVV	LVV							20th	33	
2016	ADE	ADE	ADE	STP	STP	LBH	LBH	DET	DET	DET	TOW	TOW	TOW	TOR; 9*	TOR; 12	CLT	CLT	OCF	OCF	SRF	SRF	SRF	33rd	24	

=== Superstar Racing Experience ===
(key) * – Most laps led. ^{1} – Heat 1 winner. ^{2} – Heat 2 winner.

Superstar Racing Experience results
Year	No.	1	2	3	4	5	6	SRXC	Pts	Ref
2021	13	STA; 9	KNX; 12	ELD; 5*	IRP; 8	SLG; 11	NSV; 5	7th	121	
2022	3	FIF; 12	SBO; 12	STA; 3	NSV; 4	I55; 8	SHA; 10	6th	118	
2023	3	STA; 4	STA II; 11	MMS; 10	BER	ELD	LOS	13th	0	

== See also ==
- List of Canadians in Champ Car

== Bibliography ==
- Record, Melvyn (1995). "Driver Profile: Paul Tracy". High Octane: The Fastest Motor Racing Series in the World. London, England: New Burlington Books. ISBN 1-85348-739-2 – via Internet Archive.
- Ferriss, Paul (2001). Never Too Fast: The Paul Tracy Story. Toronto, Canada: ECW Press. ISBN 978-1-55022-469-6 – via Google Books.
- Hummel, Alan (2007). Penske Racing Team: 40 Years of Excellence. Pepin, Wisconsin: Enthusiast Books. ISBN 978-1-58388-195-8 – via Internet Archive.

Sporting positions
Preceded by Mike Groff	American Racing Series Champion; 1990	Succeeded by Éric Bachelart
Preceded by Cristiano da Matta	CART Series Champion; 2003	Succeeded by Sébastien Bourdais (as Champ Car World Series Champion)
