= 1987 Can-Am season =

Seasons
- ← 1986 none →

The 1987 Can-Am Teams season was the twentieth and final running of the Sports Car Club of America's Can Am Series and the eleventh and final running of the revived series. For 1987, the series added March 85Cs from CART, although some continued to use the old prototypes. Bill Tempero was declared champion. The Marches acted as a "single seat Can Am" group, replacing the old Formula 5000 cars.

The CAT series folded at the end of the year. Tempero subsequently took his ex-Indy car chassis concept and formed the American Indycar Series in 1988.

== Schedule ==
Date	Track	Location	Winner	Chassis	Engine	Reference
October 26	Hallett Motor Racing Circuit	Tulsa, Oklahoma	Al Lamb	Frisbee GR2	Chevrolet	
May 3	Willow Springs	Rosamond, California	Buddy Lazier	March 85C	Chevrolet	
June 7	Hallett Motor Racing Circuit	Tulsa, Oklahoma	Al Lamb	Frisbee GR2	Chevrolet	
July 19	Wisconsin State Fair Park Speedway	West Allis, Wisconsin	Bill Tempero	March 85C	Chevrolet	
August 16	Sanair Super Speedway	St. Pie, Quebec	Bill Tempero	March 85C	Chevrolet	
September 6	Pueblo Motorsports Park	Pueblo, Colorado	Bill Tempero	March 85C	Chevrolet	
November 1	Phoenix International Raceway	Avondale, Arizona	Bill Tempero	March 85C	Chevrolet	
