= Sanair Super Speedway =

Auto racing track

- Tri-Oval (1983–present)

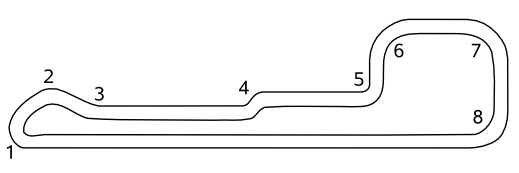
- Road Course (1972–present)
- Location: Saint-Pie, Quebec, Canada
- Coordinates: 45°31′44.76″N 72°53′01.32″W
- Opened: 1970 (drag strip); 1972 (road course); 1983 (tri-oval)
- Major events: Former: ACT Late Model Tour (2012–2013); Can-Am (1987); CART Indy Car World Series; Molson Indy Montreal (1984−1986); NHRA; Le Grandnationals Molson (1971−1992); Trans-Am Series; Molson Trans-Am (1972−1973)
- Website: http://www.sanair.ca

Tri-Oval (1983–present)
- Length: 0.826 mi (1.329 km)
- Turns: 3
- Race lap record: 0:23.534 ( (Canada) Horst Kroll, Frissbee KR3, 1987, Can-Am)

Road Course (1972–present)
- Length: 1.300 mi (2.092 km)
- Turns: 8
- Race lap record: 0:54.300 ( (United States) Warren Agor, Chevrolet Camaro, 1973, Trans-Am)

Sanair Super Speedway is a motorsports park with a 1.329 km (0.826 mi) paved triangular oval race track, a 0.402 km (0.250 mi) dragstrip, a 0.536 km (0.333 mi) oval, as well as a 0.193 km (0.120 mi) mini-oval and 0.241 km (0.150 mi) karting course. It also formerly had a 2.092 km (1.300 mi) road course which has since ceased to be used. It is located in Saint-Pie, Quebec. It hosted the Molson Indy Montreal from 1984 to 1986. The dragstrip previously hosted the NHRA's Le Grandnationals Molson until 1992, when Canadian fuel regulations, prohibiting leaded race fuel, forced the NHRA to quit holding a national event in the country. It currently hosts races in the American Canadian Tour Sèrie ACT Castrol.

== Track history ==
=== Lap records ===
The fastest official race lap records at Sanair Super Speedway are listed as:

| Category | Time | Driver | Vehicle | Event |
Tri-Oval (1983–present): 1.329 km (0.826 mi)
| Can-Am | 0:23.534 | Horst Kroll | Frissbee KR3 | 1987 Canadian American Thundercars Sanair |
Road Course (1972–present): 2.092 km (1.300 mi)
| Trans-Am (TO) | 0:54.300 | Warren Agor | Chevrolet Camaro | 1973 Sanair Trans-Am round |
| Trans-Am (TU) | 1:00.300 | Bert Everett | Alfa Romeo GTA | 1972 Sanair Trans-Am round |

=== Trans Am Series ===
| Year | Driver | Vehicle |
|---|---|---|
| 1972 | (United States) Warren Tope | Ford Mustang |
| 1973 | (United States) Warren Agor | Chevrolet Camaro |

=== Molson Indy Montreal winners (1984–1986) ===
| Season | Winning driver | Chassis | Engine | Team |
|---|---|---|---|---|
| 1984 | (United States) Danny Sullivan | Lola | Cosworth | Doug Shierson Racing |
| 1985 | (United States) Johnny Rutherford | March | Cosworth | Alex Morales Autosports |
| 1986 | (United States) Bobby Rahal | March | Cosworth | Truesports |

- During practice for the 1984 race, Rick Mears suffered serious foot and leg injuries after a crash on the mainstretch.
- The 1985 race is known for a highly controversial finish involving Johnny Rutherford and Pancho Carter. Under caution on the final lap, Rutherford led second place Carter, and appeared on his way to victory. As the field came out of the final corner, the pace car suddenly exited to pit lane, and the field unexpectedly started racing the final straightaway to the finish line. Carter got the jump on Rutherford, and edged his nose just ahead at the finish line, appearing to steal the victory. Officials deemed Carter the winner, and Carter celebrated in victory lane. Rutherford's team protested the finish because no green flag waved, and CART later restored the win to Rutherford. Under most motorsport rules, when a race is still under caution with one lap to go, there is no further opportunity for green-flag racing, and the leader takes the yellow and checkered flags as the winner.

=== NASCAR North Series ===
Sanair International Speedway

- 1979 (May): Beaver Dragon
- 1979 (July): Robbie Crouch
- 1980 (May): Bobby Dragon
- 1980 (July): Bobby Dragon
- 1981 (May): Robbie Crouch
- 1981 (July): Dick McCabe
- 1982 (May): Dick McCabe
- 1982 (August): Chuck Bown

Sanair Super Speedway

- 1983: Beaver Dragon
- 1984 (May): Randy LaJoie
- 1984 (August): Claude Leclerc
- 1985 (May): Bobby Dragon
- 1985 (August): Robbie Crouch

=== ASA National Tour ===
- 1987: Butch Miller

== See also ==
- List of auto racing tracks in Canada
- Other Montreal area race tracks
  - Circuit Gilles Villeneuve
  - Circuit ICAR
  - Circuit Mont-Tremblant
- American Canadian Tour
