= Frissbee GR2/GR3 =

American sports prototype racing cars

Frissbee GR3
- Category: Can-Am
- Constructor: Frissbee
- Designer(s): Trevor Harris
- Predecessor: Lola T332

Technical specifications
- Engine: Chevrolet 5,000 cc (305.1 cu in) V8 engine naturally-aspirated mid-engined
- Transmission: 5-speed manual
- Power: 550 hp (410 kW); 503 lb⋅ft (682 N⋅m)
- Weight: 1,550–1,800 lb (703.1–816.5 kg)
- Tyres: Goodyear or Hoosier

Competition history
- Notable entrants: Galles Racing, Canadian Tire Racing, Kroll Auto Service, Mosquito Autosport
- Notable drivers: Danny Sullivan, Al Unser Jr., Robert Meyer, Jacques Villeneuve, Horst Kroll, Rick Miaskiewicz
- Debut: 1981 Can-Am Mosport
Races	Wins
31	11
- Drivers' Championships: 3: (1982 Can-Am, 1983 Can-Am, 1985 Can-Am)

The Frissbee GR2 and Frissbee GR3 were American sports prototype racing cars, built by Frissbee in 1981 and 1982, respectively, for the Can-Am series. Originally built by Lola Cars as a Lola T332 Formula 5000 car; and featured a 5-liter Chevrolet V8 engine. It was then converted into the Spyder Can-Am car in California, raced for Newman-Freeman racing, and was driven by Keke Rosberg among others. It eventually evolved into its current iteration, and was later driven by Danny Sullivan, Robert Meyer, Al Unser Jr., Jacques Villeneuve, Sr., Horst Kroll and Rick Miaskiewicz, between 1982 and 1985. It was later sold to Colin Poole of Plum Tree Racing in England and competed there between 1987 and 1989.
