= Reynard 01I =

Racing car designed and built by Reynard Racing Cars

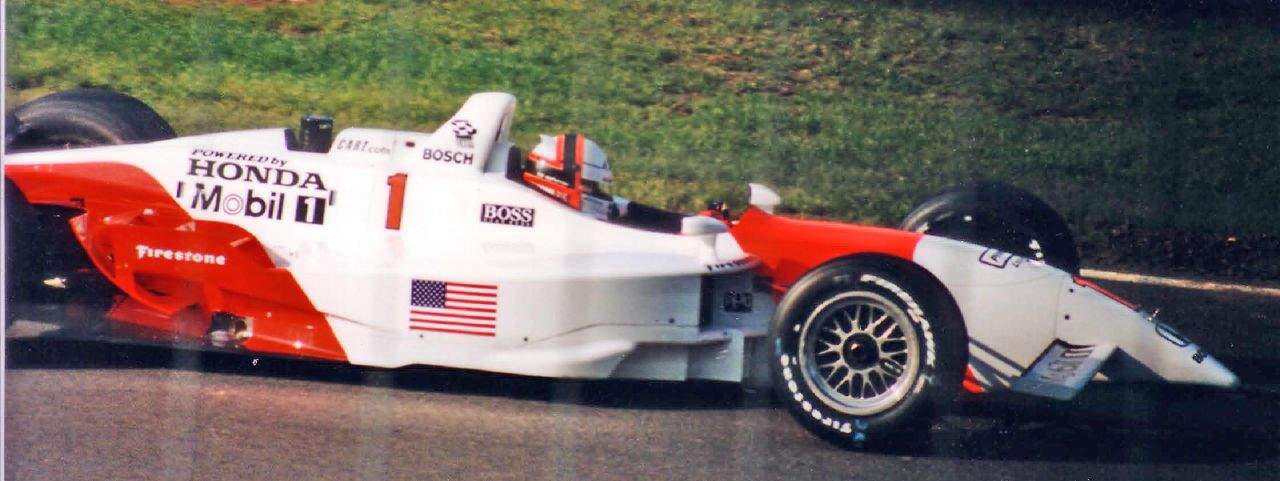
- Category: CART IndyCar
- Constructor: Reynard Racing Cars
- Predecessor: Reynard 2KI
- Successor: Reynard 02I

Technical specifications
- Length: 190 in (4,826 mm)
- Width: 78–80 in (1,981–2,032 mm)
- Height: 37 in (940 mm)
- Axle track: 68 in (1,727 mm) (Front); 68 in (1,727 mm) (Rear)
- Wheelbase: 116 in (2,946 mm)
- Engine: Honda Indy V8 turbo Toyota RV8F; Ford/Cosworth XD 2.65 L (2,650 cc; 162 cu in) V8 mid-engined
- Transmission: 6-speed sequential manual
- Weight: 1,550 lb (700 kg)
- Fuel: Methanol
- Tyres: Firestone Firehawk

Competition history
- Debut: 2001 Tecate/Telmex Grand Prix of Monterrey; Monterrey, Mexico
Races	Wins
21	11

The Reynard 01I is an open-wheel racing car chassis designed and built by Reynard Racing Cars that competed in the 2001 IndyCar season. Gil de Ferran won the drivers' title in the car, and Team Penske won the constructors' title.
