= Frissbee KR4 =

American racing car

- Category: Can-Am
- Constructor: Frissbee
- Predecessor: Lola T330
- Successor: Frissbee KR4

Technical specifications
- Engine: Chevrolet 5,000 cc (305.1 cu in) V8 engine naturally-aspirated mid-engined
- Transmission: 5-speed Manual
- Power: 600 hp (447 kW); 590 lb⋅ft (800 N⋅m)
- Weight: 670 kg (1,477.1 lb)
- Tyres: Goodyear and Hoosier

Competition history
- Notable entrants: Horst Kroll Racing
- Notable drivers: Horst Kroll
- Debut: 1984 Can-Am Mosport Park
Races	Wins
4	1
- Drivers' Championships: 2: (1986 Can-Am, 1986 Canadian-American Thundercars Championship)

The Frissbee KR4 was an American sports prototype racing car, built by Frissbee in 1984 for the Can-Am series. Originally built by Lola Cars as a Lola T330, it featured a 5-liter Chevrolet V8 engine, and was used by Horst Kroll Racing between 1986 and 1987. Paul Tracy and Bill Adam both drove the car in Can-Am in 1986, and Jacques Villeneuve and Mike Engstrand drove the car in the Canadian American Thundercars Championship in 1987.
