= Reynard 02I =

Racing car designed and built by Reynard Racing Cars

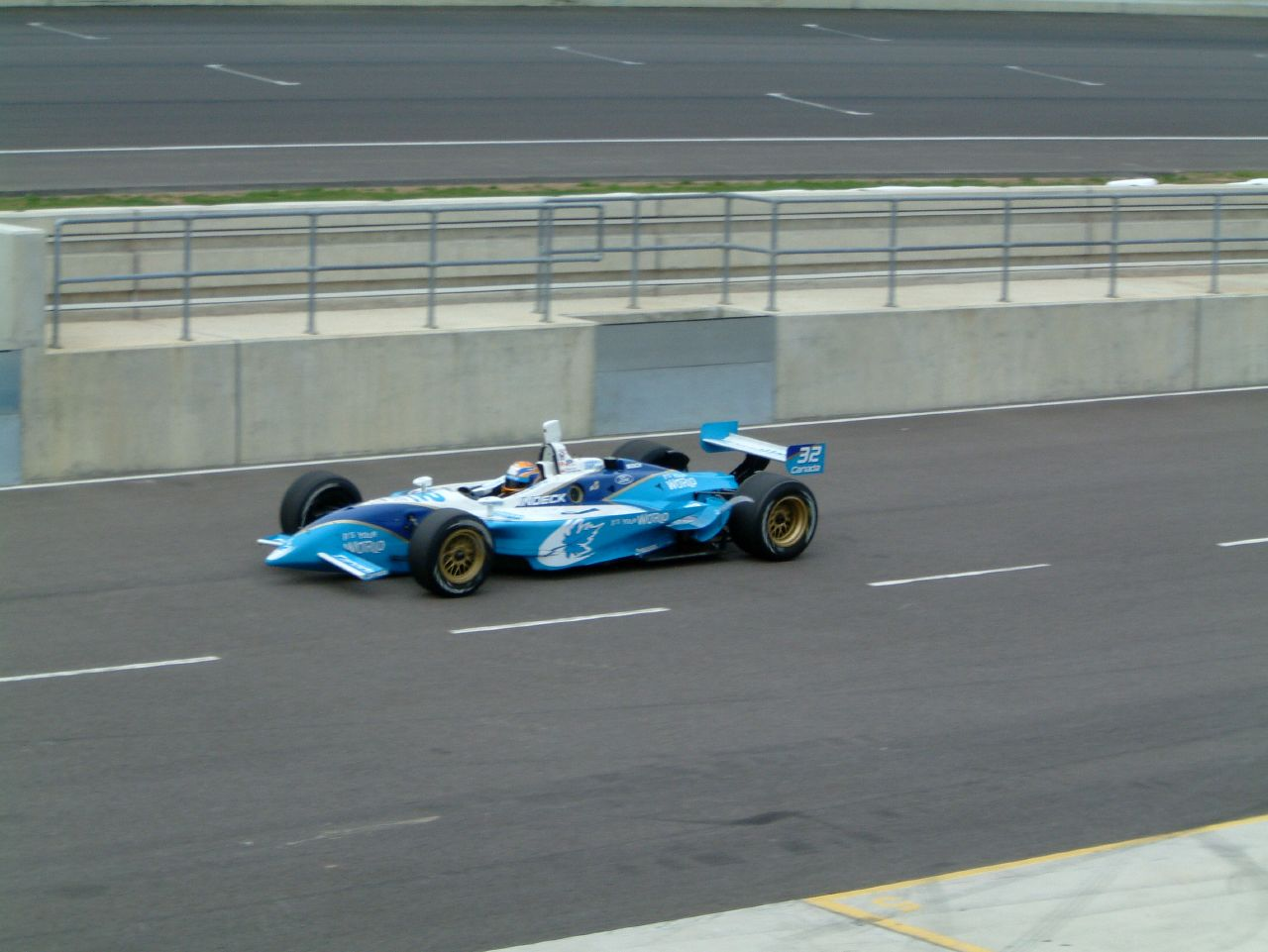
- Category: CART IndyCar
- Constructor: Reynard Racing Cars
- Predecessor: Reynard 01I
- Successor: None

Technical specifications
- Length: 190 in (4,826 mm)
- Width: 78–80 in (1,981–2,032 mm)
- Height: 37 in (940 mm)
- Axle track: 68 in (1,727 mm) (Front); 68 in (1,727 mm) (Rear)
- Wheelbase: 116 in (2,946 mm)
- Engine: Honda Indy V8 turbo Toyota RV8G; Ford/Cosworth XD 2.65 L (2,650 cc; 162 cu in) V8 mid-engined
- Transmission: 6-speed sequential manual
- Weight: 1,550 lb (700 kg)
- Fuel: Methanol
- Tyres: Bridgestone

Competition history
- Debut: 2002 Tecate/Telmex Monterrey Grand Prix; Monterrey, Mexico
Races	Wins	Poles	F/Laps
51	5	1	4

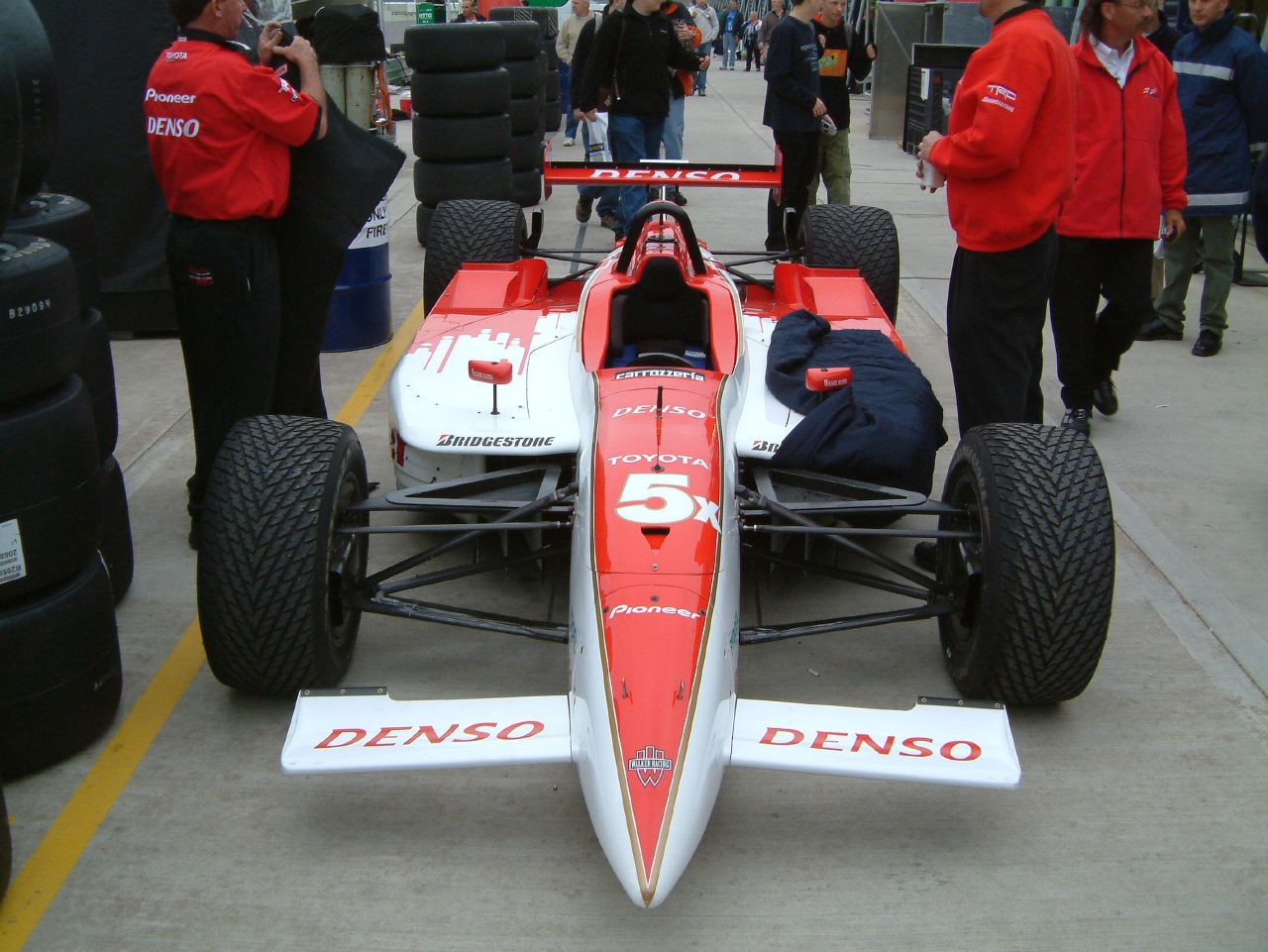
Chassis close-up

The Reynard 02I is an open-wheel racing car chassis designed and built by Reynard Racing Cars that competed in the 2002 IndyCar season. Development continued and its life was extended, and it saw competition in the Champ Car series, between 2003 and 2004.
