= Rick Miaskiewicz =

American racing driver

- Nationality: American
- Born: March 22, 1953 (age 73) Pittsburgh, Pennsylvania, U.S.
- Retired: 1987

CART World Series
- Years active: 1986-1987
- Teams: Mosquito Racing; Machinists Union
- Starts: 9
- Wins: 0
- Poles: 0
- Best finish: 32nd in 1986

Previous series
- 1985: Can-Am

Championship titles
- 1985: Can-Am Championship

Rick Miaskiewicz (born March 22, 1953) is an American former race car driver from Pittsburgh, Pennsylvania. He won the Can-Am championship in 1985, the series' next to last year of operations, and then moved to the CART series for 1986. He competed in five races in a Cosworth-powered March chassis. He returned the following year with a 1986 March and competed in four more races. His best CART finish was an 11th place at Cleveland in 1986, one of the best finishes for any rookie that season. Miaskiewicz also raced AMA Motocross and was an Alpine Ski racer.

== Racing results ==
=== CART PPG Indy Car World Series ===
PPG Indy Car World Series results
| Year | Team | Chassis | Engine | 1 | 2 | 3 | 4 | 5 | 6 | 7 | 8 | 9 | 10 | 11 | 12 | 13 | 14 | 15 | 16 | 17 | Pos. | Pts | Ref |
|---|---|---|---|---|---|---|---|---|---|---|---|---|---|---|---|---|---|---|---|---|---|---|---|
| 1986 | Mosquito Autosport | March 85C | Cosworth DFX | PHX | LBH; 21 | INDY; DNQ | MIL; 16 | POR | MEA; 15 | CLE; 11 | TOR; 13 | MCH | POC | MDO | SAN | MCH | | | | | 32nd | 2 | |
| 1986 | Machinists Union Racing | March 86C | Cosworth DFX | | | | | | | | | | | | | | ROA; DNQ | LAG | PHX | MIA | 32nd | 2 | |
| 1987 | WENS | March 86C | Cosworth DFX | LBH | PHX | INDY; DNQ | MIL | | | | | | | | | | | | | | 36th | 1 | |
| 1987 | Machinists Union Racing | March 86C | Cosworth DFX | | | | | POR; 22 | MEA | | TOR; 12 | MCH | POC | ROA | MDO; 16 | NAZ | LAG | MIA | | | 36th | 1 | |
| 1987 | Machinists Union Racing | March 87C | Cosworth DFX | | | | | | | CLE; 14 | | | | | | | | | | | 36th | 1 | |

Sporting positions
| Preceded by Michael Roe | Can-Am Champion; 1985 | Succeeded by Horst Kroll |
