= Horst Kroll =

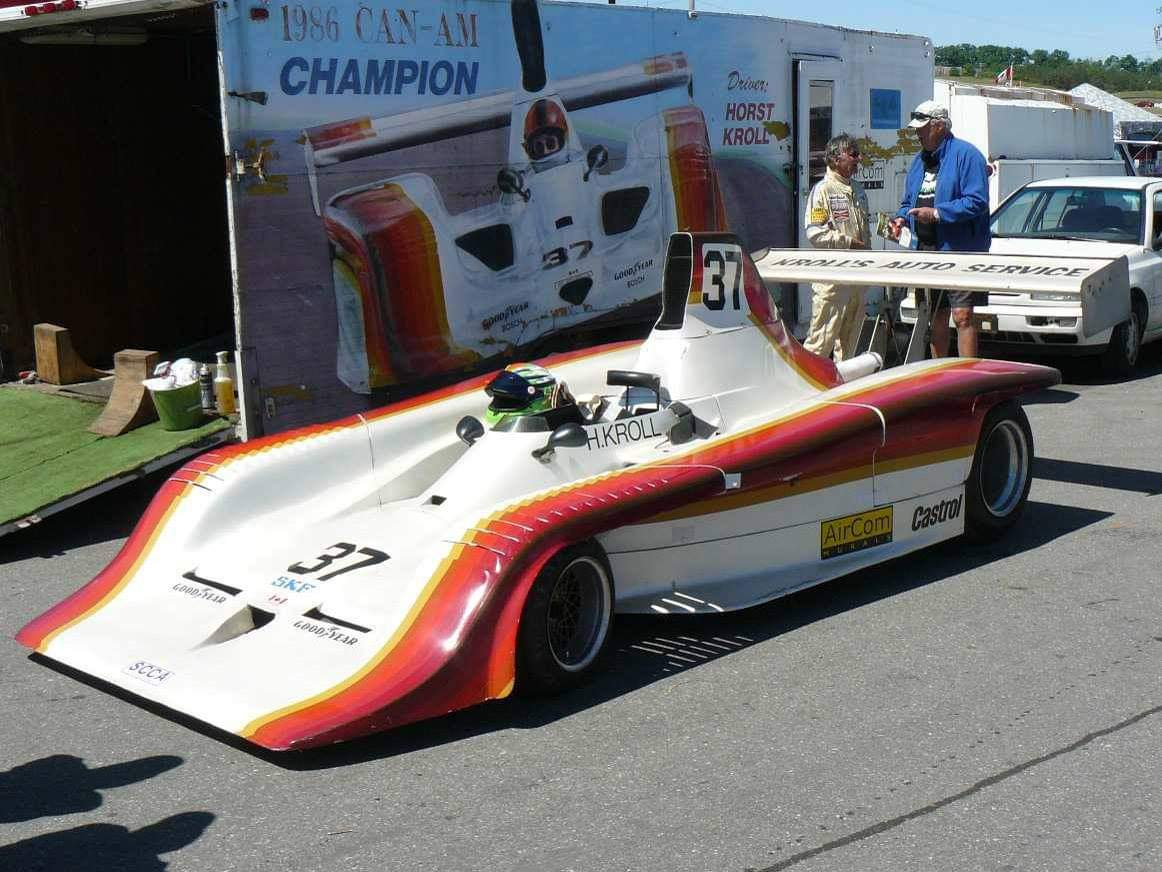
Chipwich Charger returns to Mosport

Horst Kroll (May 16, 1936 - October 26, 2017) was a German-born Canadian race driver who won the final Can-Am racing championship in 1986. At age 50 he was the second Canadian winner of the Canadian-American Challenge Cup series The Sports Car Club of America's pro racing sanctioning body had dropped the original Can-Am series in 1974, only to revive it three years later when Kroll led the first race at Mont-Tremblant, QC, but finished third. Kroll was inducted into the Canadian Motorsport Hall of Fame in 1994.

== Early life ==
Kroll left his mother and siblings in East Germany in 1954 and made his way to Stuttgart Zuffenhausen where Porsche hired him as an apprentice.

Promoted from assembling 356 sports cars to servicing cars owned by favoured clients and Porsche family members, he developed his interest in racing by donning his company overalls to gain admission to major races and offer his help in the pits.

His move into racing himself followed Porsche arranging employment as a technical specialist with Volkswagen Canada, where fellow Porsche specialist Ludwig Heimrath already was winning races in a Porsche 356. A third-place finish in another 356 in his first race at Ste. Eugene, a circuit on a deserted airfield in eastern Ontario, hooked him on the sport in 1961 and he soon added ice racing and hill climbing to his resume.

== Career ==
Formula Vee, the low-cost starter series, yielded his first championship in 1964.

Wins in a 356 Carrera at Mosport, the road course since named Canadian Tire Motorsport Park, and Harewood Acres, another airport circuit, led to Quebec star Jacques Duval inviting Kroll to co-drive his Porsche 904 GTS in long-distance races.

Duval entered them in the 1967 Sebring 12 Hours, then the major endurance event in North America, after the duo finished third in their first outing, Mosport's 6-Hour Sundown Grand Prix. Success at Sebring - second in class, 16th overall - prompted a return in 1968 in Duval's Porsche 911 S for third in class, 9th overall.

"Horst was as accomplished behind the wheel as he was under the hood of a Porsche," Duval wrote in his memoir, crediting Kroll for preparing the cars for the endurance races as well as setting the pace.

Mike Rahal, whose son Bobby would become an Indy car champion, recruited Kroll to co-drive a Porsche 906 in the 1971 Watkins Glen, NY, 6-Hour. Despite failing to finish they partnered again in Rahal's Lotus 47 in the 1972 Glen 500-km and the 250-mile Daytona Finale where they stood 5th in GTU, 11th overall.

Kroll's best Sebring result came in 1979, second in GTU and seventh overall, driving a Porsche 911 Carrera RSR with Rudi Bartling, a fellow member in Toronto's Deutscher Automobil Club. Kroll won the Sundown Grand Prix with the DAC's Harry Bytzek in the Bytzek RSR in 1975

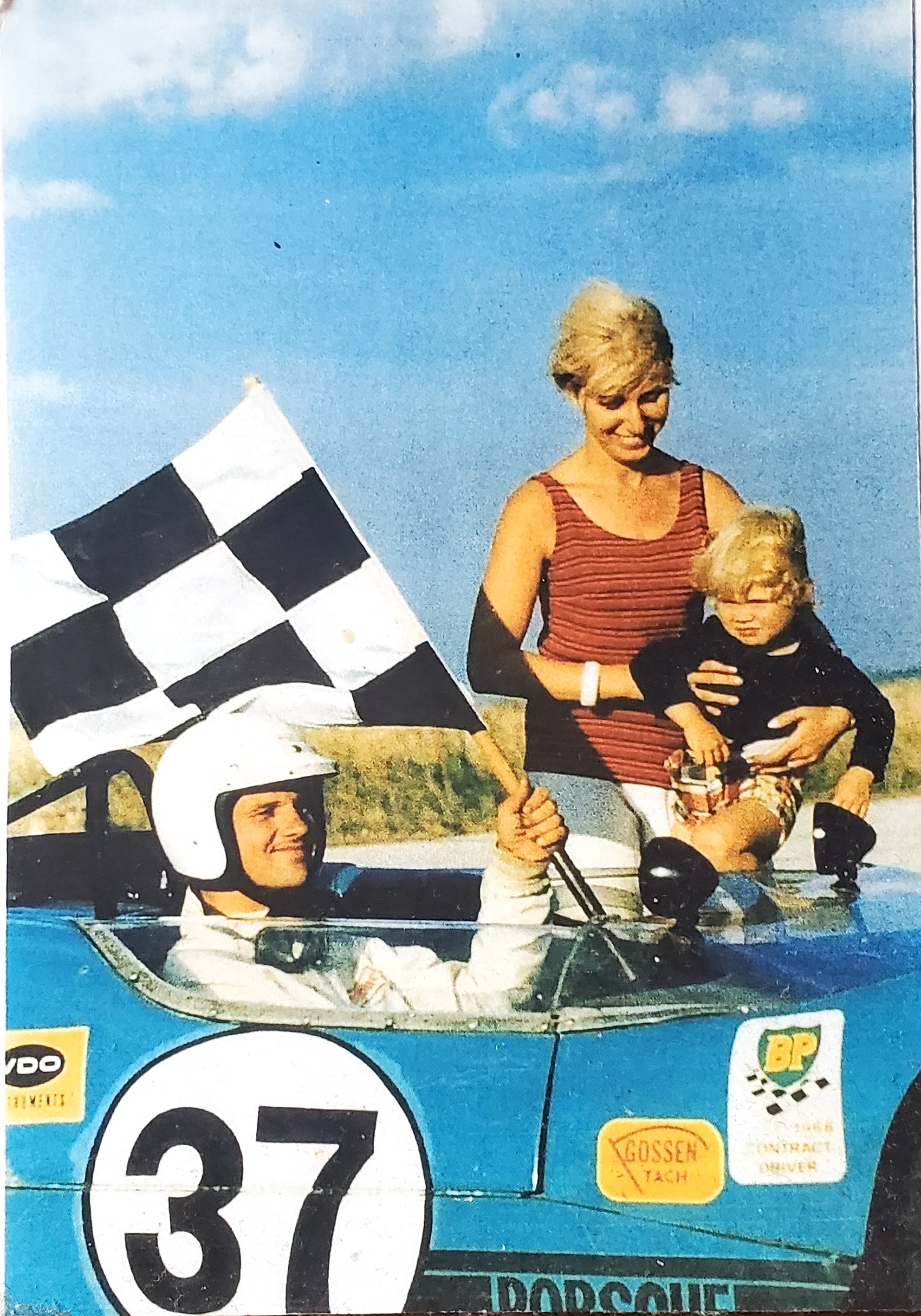
Wife Hildegard and two-year-old Birgit share the moment.

He captured the Canadian Road Racing Championship in 1968 driving the Kelly Porsche, a clone of the Lotus 23B sports racing car engineered by his friend Wayne Kelly. He put the honour in perspective with his oft-quoted remark after the awards banquet, "I got a busted trophy and a handshake.At least my mechanic won a set of tools."

He also raced the Kelly Porsche against first-generation Can-Am cars in four races of the 1968 United States Road Racing Championship that featured Can-Am regulars prior to their series commencing in the fall. Although the Kelly's Porsche engine was less than half the size of the American V-8's, Kroll scored a 9th at Watkins Glen and 12th at Mid-Ohio, both races won by Mark Donohue in the Penske McLaren M6A."

The Canadian drivers' championship switched to open-wheeled cars - called Formula A in Canada and Formula 5000 in the U.S - for 1969. Intent on defending his title, Kroll flew to England that April and bought a new Lola T142. But Eppie Wietzes dominated the Gulf Canada series; Kroll finished second behind him in four consecutive races and the first two in 1970, making him runner-up in the championship in successive years. His only win came when Wietzes failed to finish at Harewood Acres.

Racing was tougher south of the border. Underlining the high standard in the SCCA Continental Formula 5000 Championship, Jody Scheckter, Alan Jones and Mario Andretti all advanced to Formula One world titles.

Kroll persevered, complaining that inadequate prize money awarded mid-field finishers made it difficult to improve. Whereas the top three in the 1972 season opener at Laguna Seca, CA, shared $27,060, eighth-place Kroll's reward was $600.

Worse, car breakdowns at Lime Rock Park, CT and Road Atlanta, GA produced $225 checks. Kroll's most successful F5000 campaign followed in 1976 when he stood twelfth in championship points with a fifth at Watkins Glen his best finish.

=== Can-Am years ===
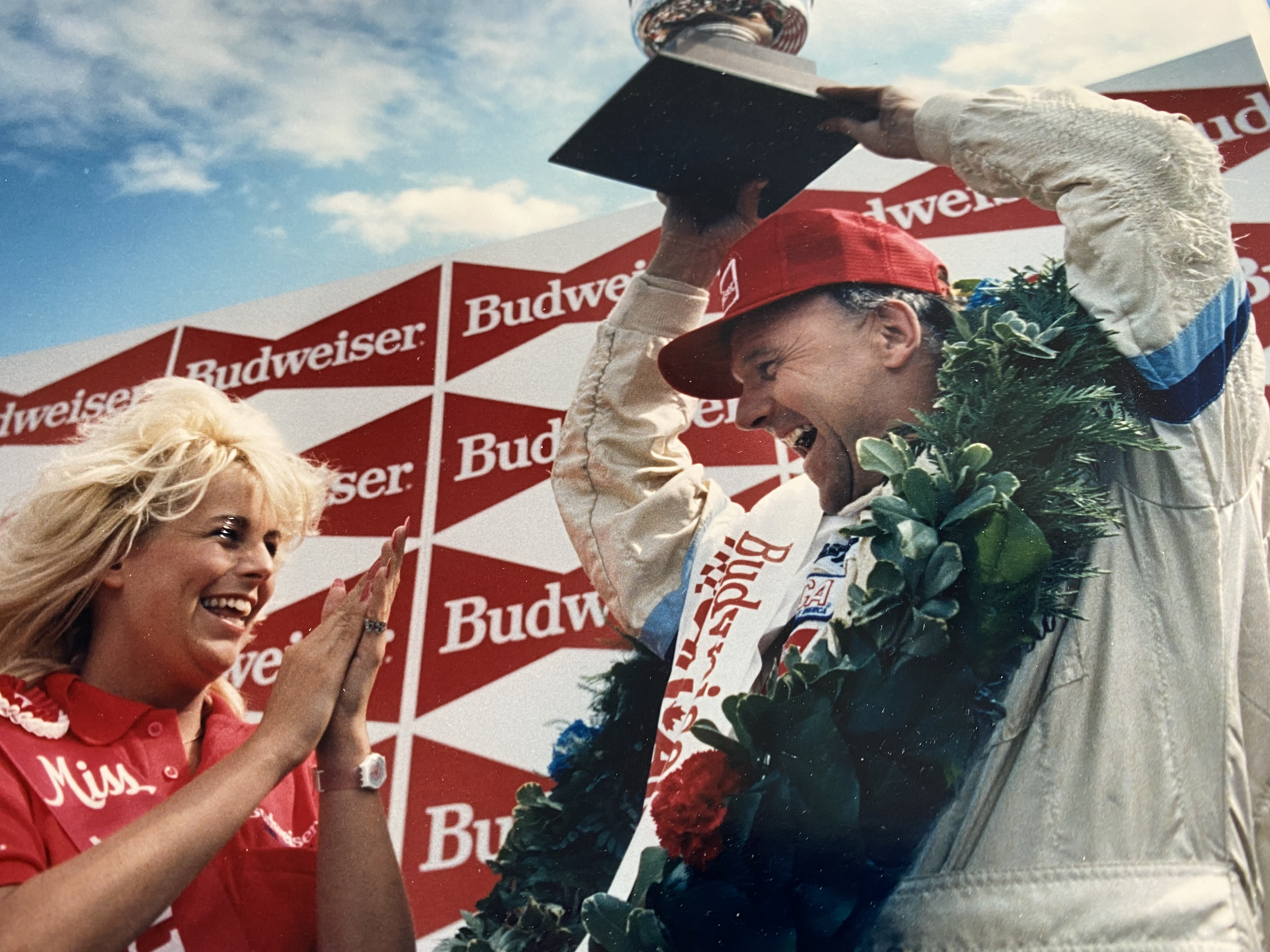
Mounting the top step of Mosport's victory stand followed years of frustration

For 1977 the SCCA called on its teams to rebuild their F5000 cars enclosing the wheels to resemble the legendary Can-Am machines that had commanded international attention from 1966 through 1974. In so doing Kroll gained a fresh start in the Lola T300 in which he'd contested 26 F5000 outings, with a new body crafted by fellow Canadian Roy Hayman.

He led the first race of the 'new' Can-Am at rain-slicked Mont-Tremblant, QC, June 6, 1977, as other drivers pitted for slick tires better suited to the drying pavement.

Staying on rain tires put Kroll in front but slowed his pace so he finished third - it would be his best result over the first eight years of the revived Can-Am.

He counted three top-five finishes among 19 top-10's in his next 39 races. His Volkswagen-Porsche repair shop funded his racing, but left him perennially short. His daughter, Birgit, described how he'd tour tracks' paddocks the night before races searching other teams' garbage bins for parts like camshafts. Although cast off as overly worn, they were good for a second life in Kroll's car.

He became newly competitive in 1983 when his first major sponsorship enabled him to re-body his Lola T330 as a near clone to the Galles Frissbee that Al Unser Jr. drove to the 1982 championship and acquire a 550-horsepower VDS-built Chevrolet engine. This was Lola HU2, a F5000 car in which Alan Jones had won at Brands Hatch a decade earlier.

Also working in Kroll's favour, front-running teams moved to Indy Car racing. Four-time champion Carl Haas departed in 1982; VDS, Rick Galles and Paul Newman followed in 1983, levelling the Can-Am playing field by their absence.

While fellow-Canadian Jacques Villeneuve Sr. raced the ex-Unser Galles Frissbee to the 1983 championship, Kroll wasn't far behind in the Chipwich Charger (so named promoting the sponsor's new ice cream sandwich, but officially dubbed the Frissbee KR3). He counted fourths at Trois-Rivieres, QC and Sears Point, CA along with fifths at Mosport and a second Sears Point race for fifth in the championship.

Kroll won the 1985 season opener at Mosport, his first victory in eight years and 62 starts. American newcomer Rick Miaskiewicz led off the start in the same Galles Frissbee Unser Jr. and Villeneuve Sr. drove to their championships, but Kroll took over when Miaskiewicz spun off at Turn One. Making the day even more celebratory, Joe DeMarco took third in another Horst Kroll Racing entry.

Miaskiewicz scored three victories and the 1985 championship with Kroll second behind him each time for second in points. In Mosport's 1986 opener he topped his first win by qualifying fastest and leading from the start, with IMSA star Bill Adam second in another Kroll entry, a Frissbee KR4.

After the SCCA announced the series would fold after four races, Kroll became its final champion by adding to the season-opening victory with a fourth at Summit Point, WV, second at St. Louis, MO and another second at Mosport's fall race. Paul Tracy took the Can-am finale in the Kroll team's KR4; it was the 17-year-old's first step beyond the starter formulas on the way to Indy Car stardom.

The Can-Am competitors tried salvaging their brand of racing by forming a new organization, Championship Auto Teams, adding a single race at Hallet, OK to the Can-Am races to create the CAT Thunder Car Championship. Kroll took its title along with his Can-Am laurels by finishing sixth at Hallett.

He committed to defending his CAT title in 1987 while offering his team cars to guest drivers to create larger starting fields, as he had with young Tracy at Mosport's Can-Am finale. Villeneuve Sr. drove the KR4 to second behind Bill Tempero in CAT's visit to Canada's best-known oval, Sanair Super Speedway, QC with Kroll fourth in KR3 and John Macaluso sixth in KR5.

Kroll also took third behind Tempero at Milwaukee and eighth at Phoenix for third in points behind the American oval racing veteran.

=== Retirement ===
With Can-Am cars finally relegated to the sidelines in 1988 by Tempero introducing the American Indycar Series for superannuated Indy cars, Kroll retired from professional racing at the age of 52.

He returned to Mosport for a handful of endurance races co-driving with friends and in his final appearance fired up KR3 for parade laps at the Vintage Automobile Racing Association of Canada (VARAC) festival in 2007.
