= March 86A =

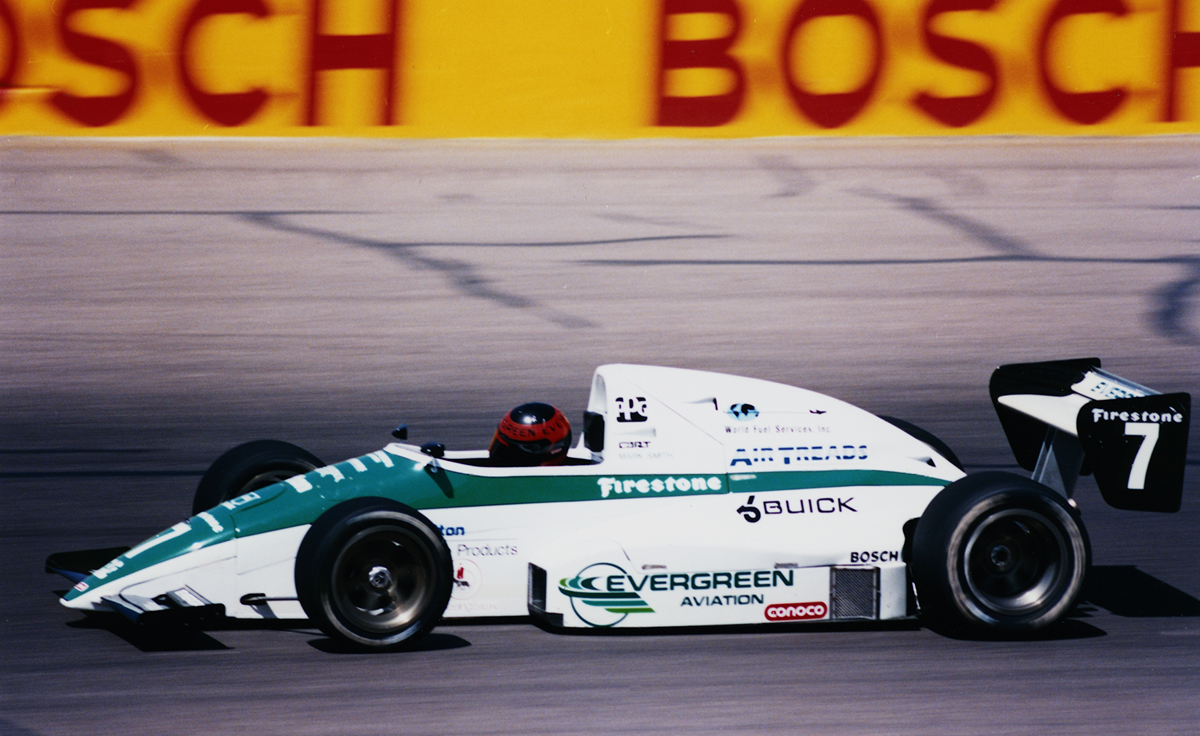
- Category: Indy Lights
- Constructor: March

Technical specifications
- Chassis: Aluminum/carbon fiber monocoque with rear sub-frame covered in fiberglass body
- Suspension (front): Double wishbones, Coil springs over shock absorbers, Anti-roll bar
- Suspension (rear): Twin lower links, Single top links, twin trailing arms, Coil springs over shock absorbers, Anti-roll bar
- Wheelbase: 3,000 mm (118 in)
- Engine: Buick, mid-engined, longitudinally mounted, 4.2 L (256.3 cu in), 90°, V6, OHV, NA
- Transmission: Hewland FT-200 5/6-speed manual
- Power: 429–500 hp (320–373 kW) >400 lb⋅ft (540 N⋅m)
- Weight: 1,230 lb (560 kg)
- Brakes: Disc brakes (front & rear)

Competition history
- Debut: 1986

The March 86A, also designated as the March 86/A, was an open-wheel formula race car, designed, developed and built by British manufacturer March Engineering, for the American Racing Series (later Indy Lights), between 1986 and 1992. It was essentially a rebadged March 85B or 86B Formula 3000 chassis, using the name Wildcat, and all used identical Buick V6 engines.
