= March Engineering =

Former Formula One constructor

(United Kingdom) March
- Full name: March Engineering
- Base: United Kingdom
- Founder(s): Max Mosley; Alan Rees; Graham Coaker; Robin Herd
- Noted drivers: (New Zealand) Chris Amon (Switzerland) Jo Siffert (Austria) Niki Lauda (Sweden) Ronnie Peterson (Italy) Vittorio Brambilla (France) Henri Pescarolo

Formula One World Championship career
- First entry: 1970 South African Grand Prix
- Races entered: 205 (195 starts)
- Engines: Ford, Alfa Romeo, Judd, Ilmor
- Constructors' Championships: 0
- Drivers' Championships: 0
- Race victories: 2
- Pole positions: 2
- Fastest laps: 4
- Final entry: 1992 Australian Grand Prix

March as a Formula One chassis constructor
Formula One World Championship career
- Entrants: Tyrrell Racing, Frank Williams Racing Cars, Hesketh Racing, Williams, several minor teams and privateers
- First entry: 1970 South African Grand Prix
- Last entry: 1992 Australian Grand Prix
- Races entered: 209
- Race victories: 3
- Constructors' Championships: 0
- Drivers' Championships: 0
- Pole positions: 5
- Fastest laps: 7

March Engineering was a British racing car constructor and team based in Bicester, Oxfordshire, United Kingdom. Although only moderately successful in Formula One, March racing cars enjoyed much better success in other categories of competition, including Formula Two, Formula Three, IndyCar and IMSA GTP sportscar racing.

== 1970s ==
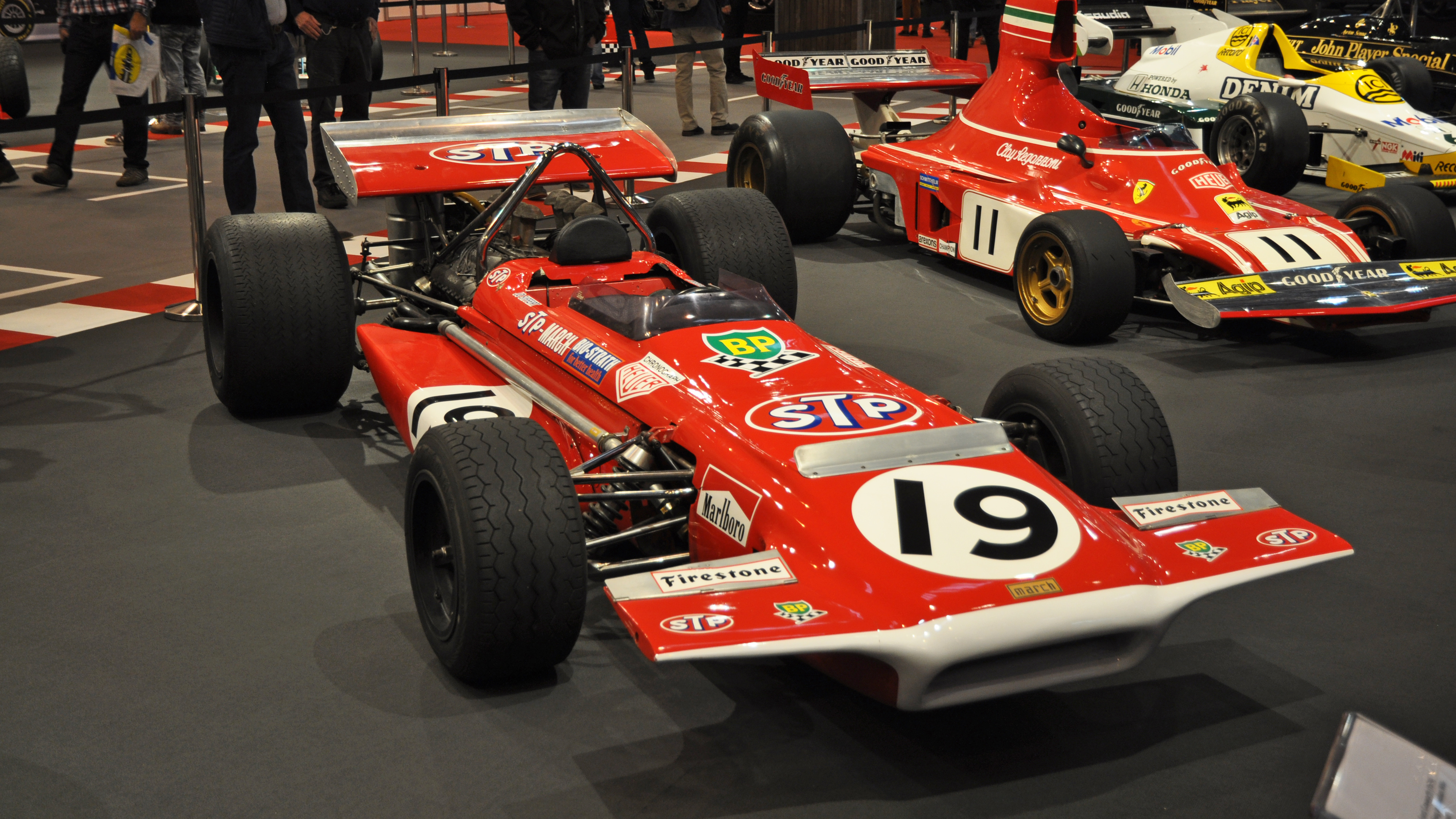
March 701

March Engineering began operations in 1969. Its four founders were Max Mosley, Alan Rees, Graham Coaker and Robin Herd. The company name is an acronym of their initials. They each had a specific area of expertise: Mosley looked after the commercial side, Rees managed the racing team, Coaker oversaw production at the factory in Bicester, Oxfordshire, and Herd was the designer.

The history of March is dominated by the conflict between the need for constant development and testing to remain at the peak of competitiveness in F1, and the need to build simple, reliable cars for customers in order to make a profit. Herd's original F1 plan was to build a single-car team around Jochen Rindt, but Rindt became dismayed at the size of the March programme and elected to continue at Team Lotus.

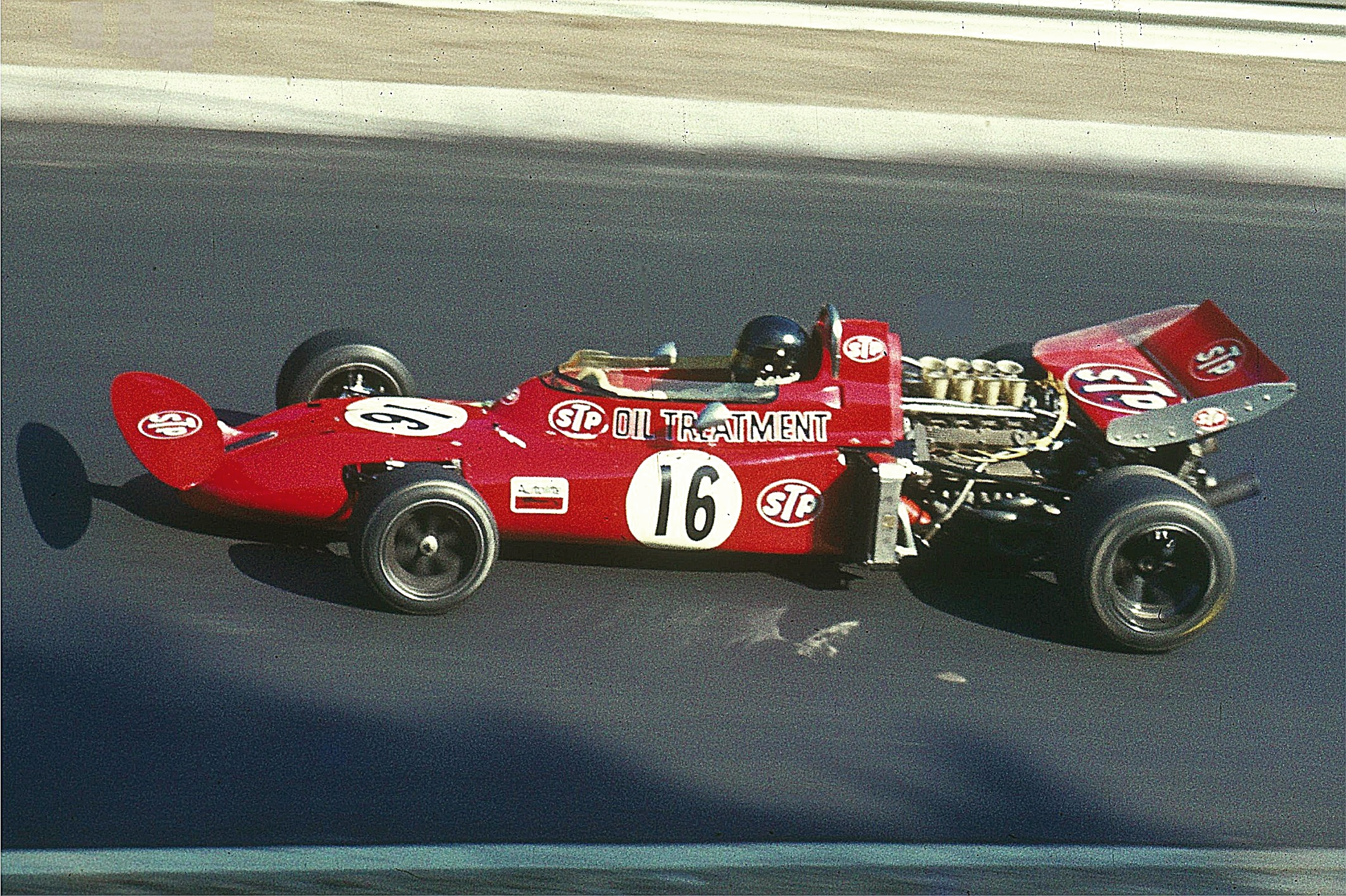
Andrea de Adamich driving a March-Alfa Romeo 711 at the 1971 German Grand Prix

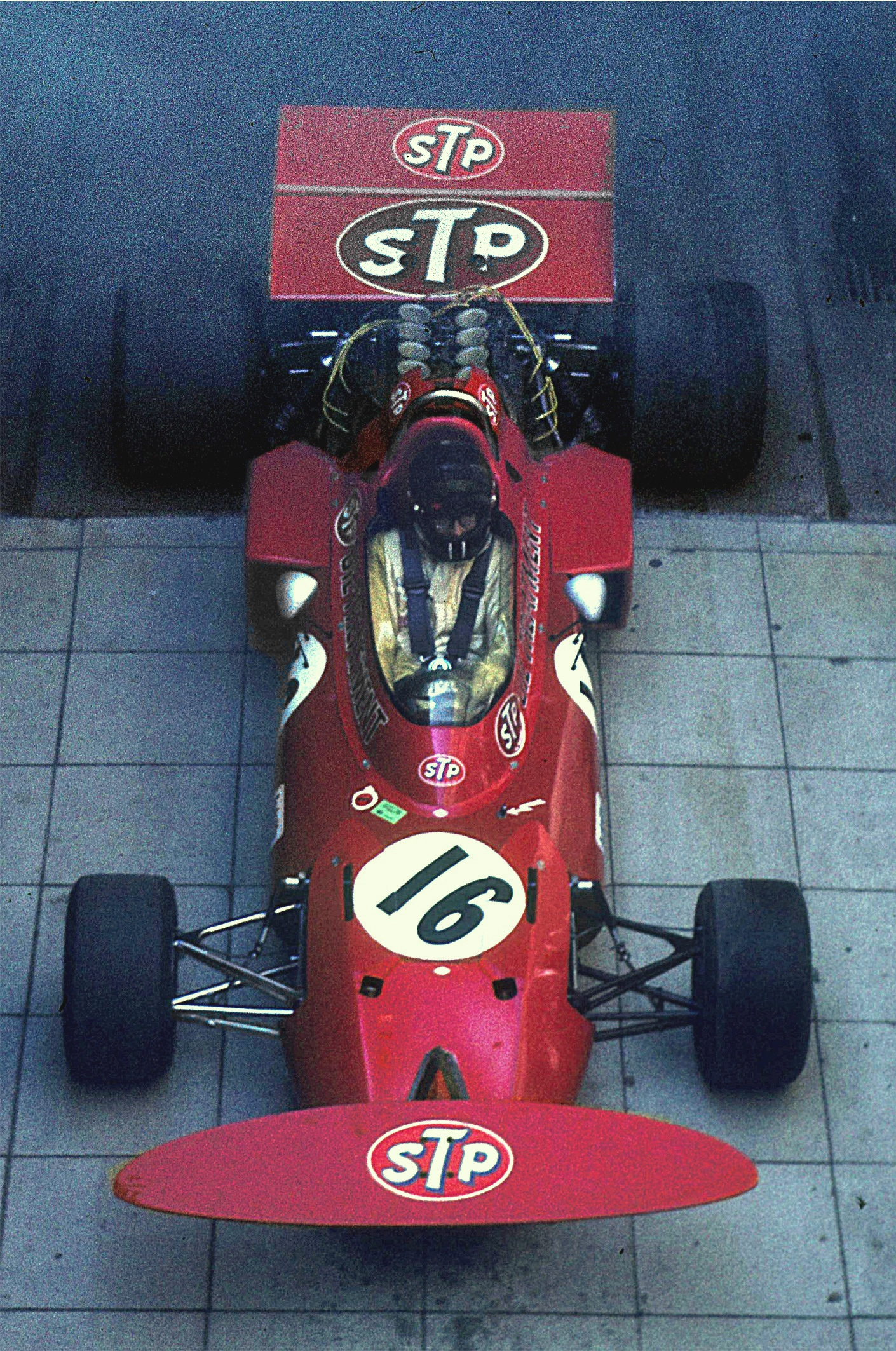
De Adamich going to practice in a March 711

March's launch was unprecedented in its breadth and impact. After building a single Formula Three car in 1969, March announced that they would be introducing customer cars for F1, F2, F3, Formula Ford and Can-Am in 1970, as well as running works F1, F2 and F3 teams.

The Formula One effort initially looked promising, with March supplying its 701 chassis to Tyrrell for Jackie Stewart. These cars were merely a stopgap for Tyrrell, who no longer had the use of Matra chassis and were in the process of constructing their own car; March was the only option available given clashing fuel contracts. In addition, the factory ran two team cars for Jo Siffert (Porsche were paying for his drive) and Chris Amon sponsored by STP. A third STP car, entered by Andy Granatelli for Mario Andretti, appeared on several occasions. Ronnie Peterson appeared in a semi-works car for Colin Crabbe when his works Formula Two commitments allowed; various other 701s went to privateers. The team constructed ten Formula One chassis that year, in addition to Formula Two, Formula Three, Formula Ford and Can-Am chassis. Stewart gave the March its first Formula One victory, at the 1970 Spanish Grand Prix, and both Amon and Stewart took a non-championship race victory, but the works team did not win a Grand Prix. The 701 had distinctive aerofoil-profile fuel tanks at the sides of the car designed by Peter Wright of Specialised Mouldings; Wright had been involved with BRM's abortive ground-effect programme in the late sixties and later worked on the groundbreaking Lotus 78. The 701's tanks lacked endplates and skirts to help generate any meaningful ground effect. Herd (in Mike Lawrence's history of the team Four Guys and a Telephone) described the 701 as essentially a good 1969 car and not what he would have done had he been able to run a small team for a star like Rindt - the 701 was designed and built very quickly and he claims he would have built something more like the 711.

For the 1971 Formula One season March Engineering came up with the remarkable 711 chassis, which had aerodynamics by Frank Costin and an ovoid front wing described as the Spitfire (for its shape) or "tea-tray" (for its elevation from the car) wing. The car took no wins, but Peterson finished second on four occasions, ending as runner-up in the World Championship. Alfa Romeo V8 powered cars were occasionally entered, to little avail (following on from an equally unsuccessful Alfa program with McLaren).

The 1972 Formula One season completely failed to capitalise on the promise March showed in 1970–71. Three distinct models of the car were used, beginning with the 721, which was a development of the 711. Peterson and Niki Lauda then drove the disappointing experimental 721X factory cars (using an Alfa Romeo transverse gearbox and intended to have a low polar-moment, anticipating in some ways the much more successful Tyrrell 005/006 series). Frank Williams ran regular 711 and 721 customer cars for Henri Pescarolo and Carlos Pace. The 721X was deemed to be a disaster and abandoned, but the team saw a way out; customer Mike Beuttler and his backers ordered an F1 car, and the team produced the 721G in nine days (the G stood for Guinness Book Of Records as the car was built so quickly) by fitting a Cosworth DFV and larger fuel tanks to the 722 F2 chassis (not as desperate an experiment as it may have sounded -- John Cannon commissioned a Formula 5000 car which was built to a very similar scheme). The 721G was light and quick, and the works team soon built their own chassis. The 721G set the trend for future March F1 cars, which for the rest of the 1970s were essentially scaled-up F2 chassis. Meanwhile, March was going from strength to strength in Formula Two and Formula Three.

Also, the German team Eifelland entered under its own name a 721 much-modified with distinctive and eccentric bodywork by designer Luigi Colani for its driver Rolf Stommelen. This car was extremely unsuccessful, and later reverted mostly to conventional 721 form and was used by John Watson to make his F1 debut for John Goldie's Goldie Hexagon Racing team.

March's only notable result was Peterson's third place in Germany.

1973 was the low point for March in Formula One. The four extant 721Gs were re-bodied and fitted with nose-mounted radiators and the crash-absorbing deformable structures that became mandatory that season; although no new chassis were built, they were re-designated 731s. Without significant STP money, the March factory team was struggling, running an almost unsponsored car for Jean-Pierre Jarier (who mainly concentrated on F2, winning the championship in a works March-BMW), while Hesketh bought a car for James Hunt to race. Jarier was replaced by Tom Wheatcroft's driver Roger Williamson, who suffered a fatal accident in Zandvoort (at which race March privateer David Purley attempted to rescue Williamson from his burning car). The Hesketh team, after an initial non-championship outing using a Surtees, bought a March which was heavily re-developed by Harvey Postlethwaite and became a regular points-scorer, again hinting that there was little wrong with the basic concept of the 721G/731. 1973 marked the first year that F2 became more important to March than F1, with the new two-litre rules heralding the beginning of a long relationship with Paul Rosche at BMW. March undertook to buy a quantity of BMW engines each year in exchange for works units for their own team; the BMW unit was standard-issue for the 732 F2 car and to use up the rest of the units March also manufactured a two-litre prototype until 1975. Some of these had an unusually long life and were still competing (albeit much-modified) in Japan in the early 1980s.

In 1974, the factory team ran Howden Ganley until he left, having signed with Maki as their number-one driver. Then March ran Hans-Joachim Stuck in a Jägermeister-sponsored car and Vittorio Brambilla in a Beta Tools-sponsored car. Both drivers were exuberant and occasionally quick, but proved expensive in terms of accident damage. BMW was starting to exert pressure on March to quit F1 and concentrate on F2. Patrick Depailler took the F2 championship in an Elf-sponsored March-BMW, the marque's last title for several years as the Elf sponsorship programme and (in 1976) the arrival of Renault engines turned the formula into a French benefit. Some discontent arose in the March customer ranks in F2 since the works appeared after the first couple of F2 races with cars that differed significantly from the customer vehicles.

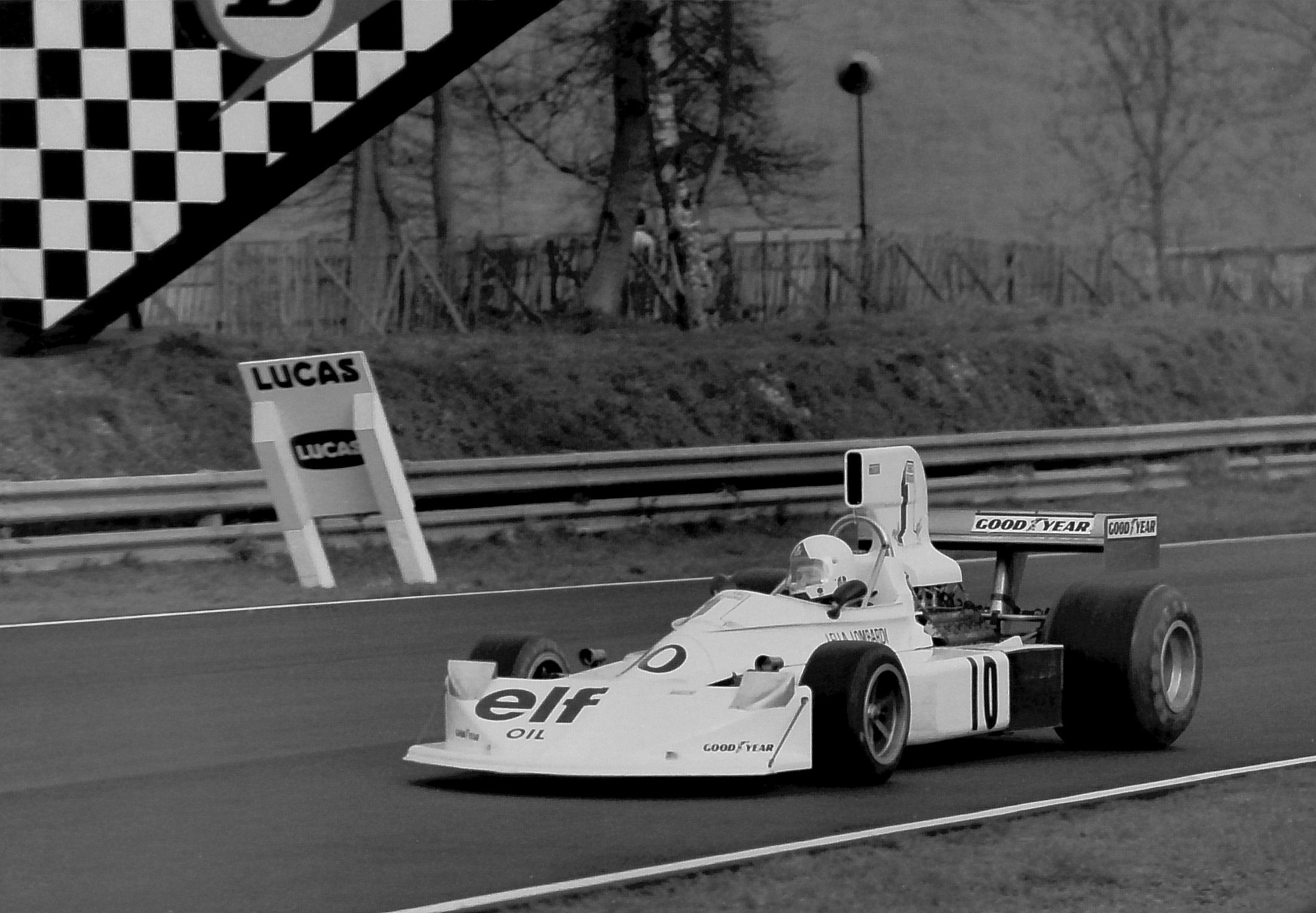
Lella Lombardi at the 1975 Race of Champions in a March 751

In the following year Brambilla and Lella Lombardi made March Engineering history. At the 1975 Spanish Grand Prix Lombardi became the first woman to score a championship point in Formula One while Brambilla scored a surprise victory at the 1975 Austrian Grand Prix, giving the team its maiden win. (As both races were rain-shortened, all participants received only half of the points). During the same weekend of the Austrian Grand Prix, Mark Donohue died after a practice accident in a Penske-owned March. Penske had abandoned their own car and bought a March to allow them to continue competing. Through the mid-1970s, March provided privateers with simple, fast, and economical cars; at one point Frank Williams bought an allegedly brand new 761B only to discover that it still had orange paint on it from its time as a 751 with Brambilla driving.

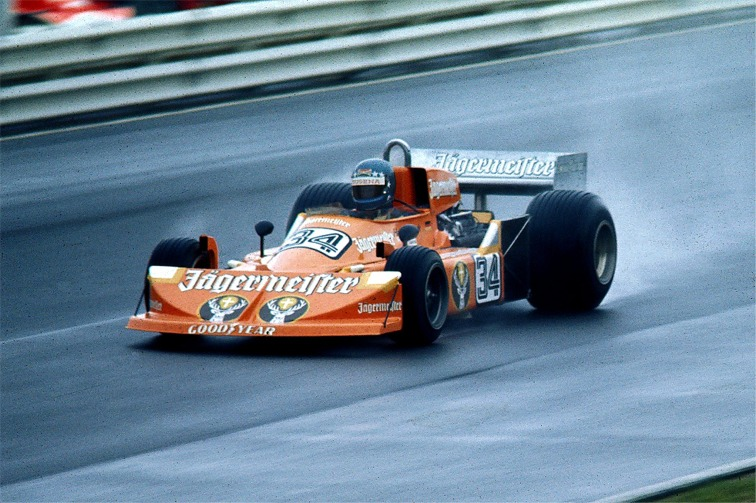
Hans-Joachim Stuck driving a March 761 at the Nürburgring in 1976

In 1976, Peterson, unhappy with the uncompetitive Lotus, left the team early and returned to March for whom he scored the team's second and last win at Monza. The 761 was fast but fragile, with the F2 components starting to show the strain; by this point the F1 effort was being run on a small budget with a two-car works effort featuring Peterson and Brambilla, the cars tending to turn up in different liveries as race-by-race sponsorship deals were signed, and a B-team entered under the March Engines banner for Stuck and Arturo Merzario. By now the F1 effort as a whole was under fairly severe pressure from BMW, which wanted Herd to concentrate entirely on the works' Formula Two effort, which was starting to be outpaced by French constructors (Martini and Elf) and the new Ralt marque.

That year Peterson scored only one other point in 1976 before being brokered back into a deal with Tyrrell for 1977. Although he felt most at home at March, it was clear that the team did not have the resources to do Formula One properly.

In the off-season of 1976–77, March engineer Wayne Eckersley constructed a rear end for the 761 chassis that had four driven wheels (designated the March 2-4-0) to Robin Herd's design. Unlike the six-wheeled Tyrrell P34, the 2-4-0 had four 16-inch driven wheels at the rear (the same size as the front wheels). The theory behind the design was that this arrangement would offer improved traction and reduced aerodynamic drag (compared to the Tyrrell, which used ultra-small front wheels and normally sized rears). The chassis was tested at Silverstone circuit in early 1977 by both Howden Ganley and Ian Scheckter but the project was curtailed in favour of further development of the conventional chassis. The car made March more profit than many of its successful racing cars as it was licensed by Scalextric and became one of their most popular models. The 2-4-0 rear end was later used in hillclimbing by various drivers including Roy Lane.

A token F1 effort with Rothmans sponsorship was run in 1977 for Alex Ribeiro and Ian Scheckter, but nothing worthwhile was achieved. Yet, as the works were fading from F1 the 761, by virtue of being cheap, simple and readily available, became the tool of choice for privateers, notably Frank Williams who after his acrimonious split with Walter Wolf needed a car to get back into racing before his own vehicle was ready.

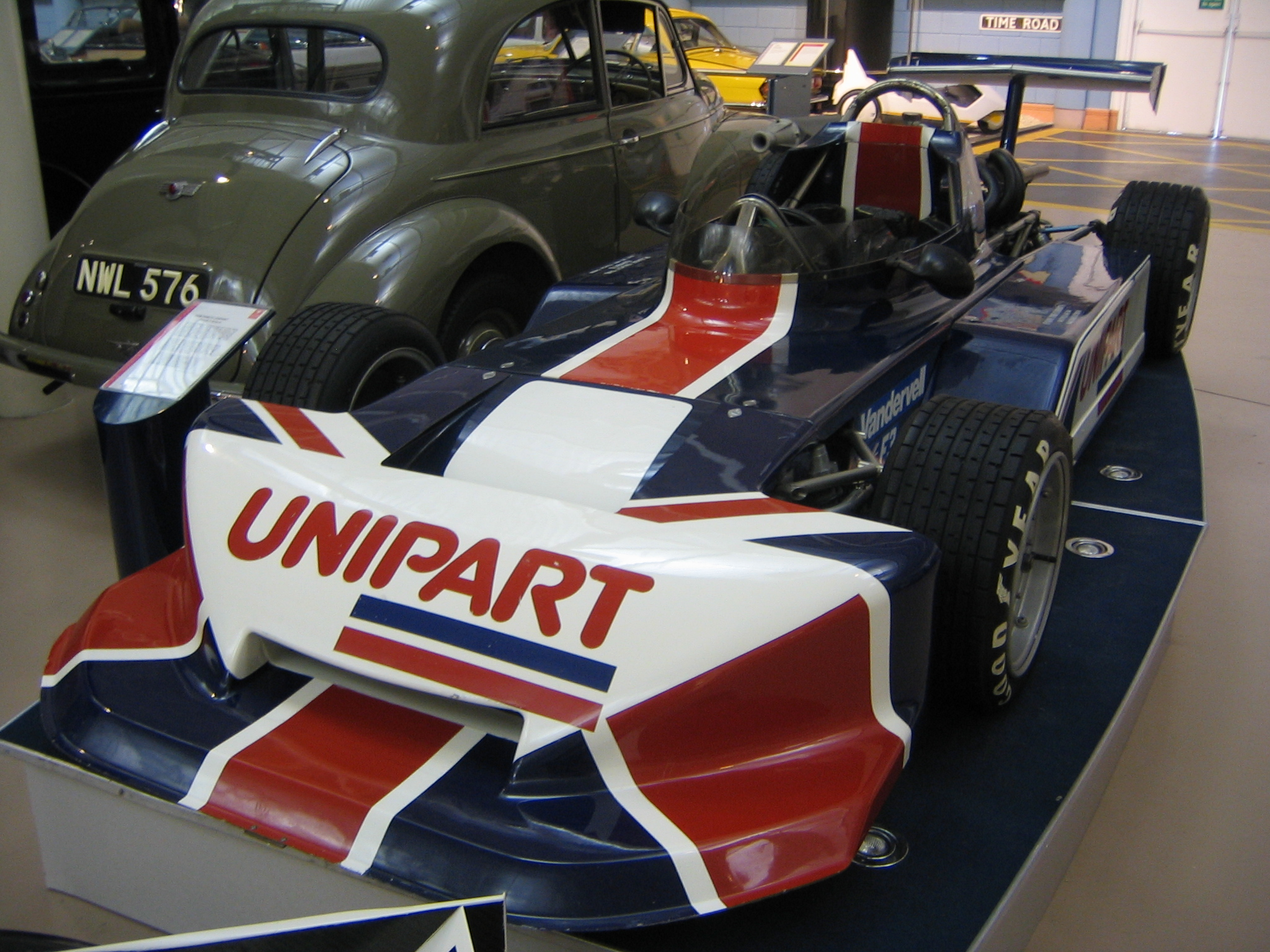
1978 March-Triumph F3 car, as raced by Nigel Mansell, on display at the British Motor Museum, Gaydon

Merzario later built his own unsuccessful F1 car based on his old 761, which he and Simon Hadfield attempted to develop into a ground effect car. This programme was completely unsuccessful.

At the end of the 1977 season, the F1 team's assets and FOCA membership were sold to ATS (who had bought the Penske cars); Herd was retained by them as a consultant and was hence in the curious position of developing a development of his own 1975 car - and the 1978 ATS had some features reminiscent of contemporary March thinking. Mosley left the company to concentrate on FOCA matters. The F2 car had reached the end of a train of development that had started with the 732 and was becoming seriously uncompetitive; the works team abandoned the evolutionary 772 in favour of a smaller, neater car built around an old Formula Atlantic monocoque, the 772P. This was more than a match for the Martini opposition and formed the basis of the next year's dominant 782.

From 1978, March concentrated on Formula Two, running the works BMW team. A 781 chassis was occasionally campaigned in the minor Aurora F1 series. March also assisted in the production of the Group 4 and Group 5, racing versions of the BMW M1 sports car, which as well as running in mainstream endurance races also ran in the one-make Procar series as supporting events in many F1 races. The F2 cars of this era, particularly the 782, were often superb, and March regained its dominance of the formula - Bruno Giacomelli took the F2 title.

Ground effects came to F2 in 1979 but were widely misunderstood; for a while it looked like Rad Dougall in the Toleman team's conventional 782 would beat not only Brian Henton in Toleman's own car but also March's new 792 to the title. In the end, however, Marc Surer prevailed for the works.

== 1980s ==
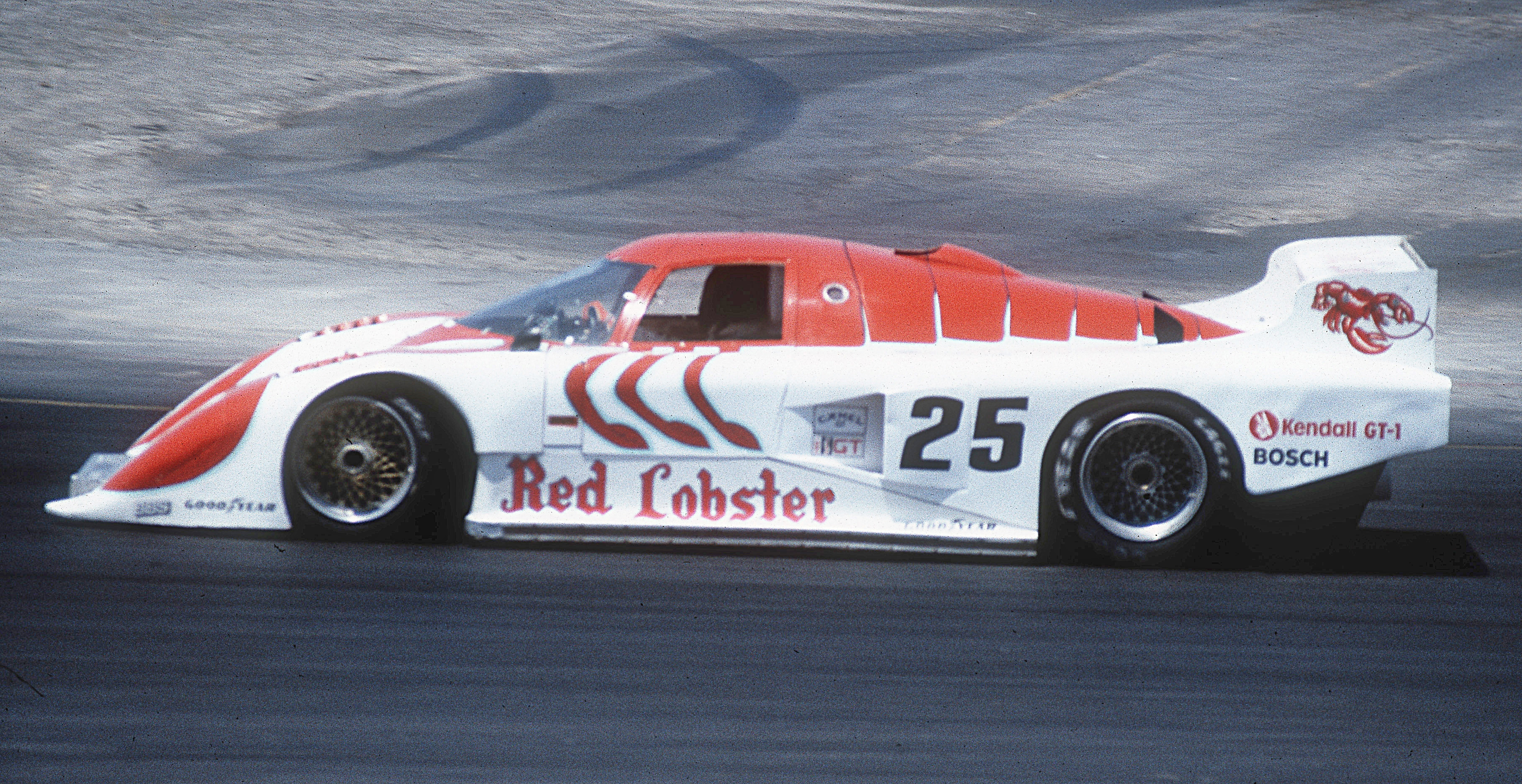
A March 83G-Chevy driven by David Cowart and Kenper Miller takes part in a 1983 Camel GT race at Sears Point.

In 1981 March made a half-hearted and ill-financed effort to return to F1, building cars that were little more than heavy and insufficiently stiff copies of the Williams FW07 for Mick Ralph and John McDonald's RAM Racing. The car was driven initially by Eliseo Salazar, but he soon quit for Derek Daly to take over. The team acquired a major sponsorship deal from Rothmans in 1982, but the money came too late for Herd or Adrian Reynard (who was working as chief engineer) to improve the performance of the cars. In 1983, McDonald started building his own cars and March was left outside F1 once more. The RAM-March effort was at armslength from March proper, with the cars being built at a separate factory and the only real link with March being Robin Herd.

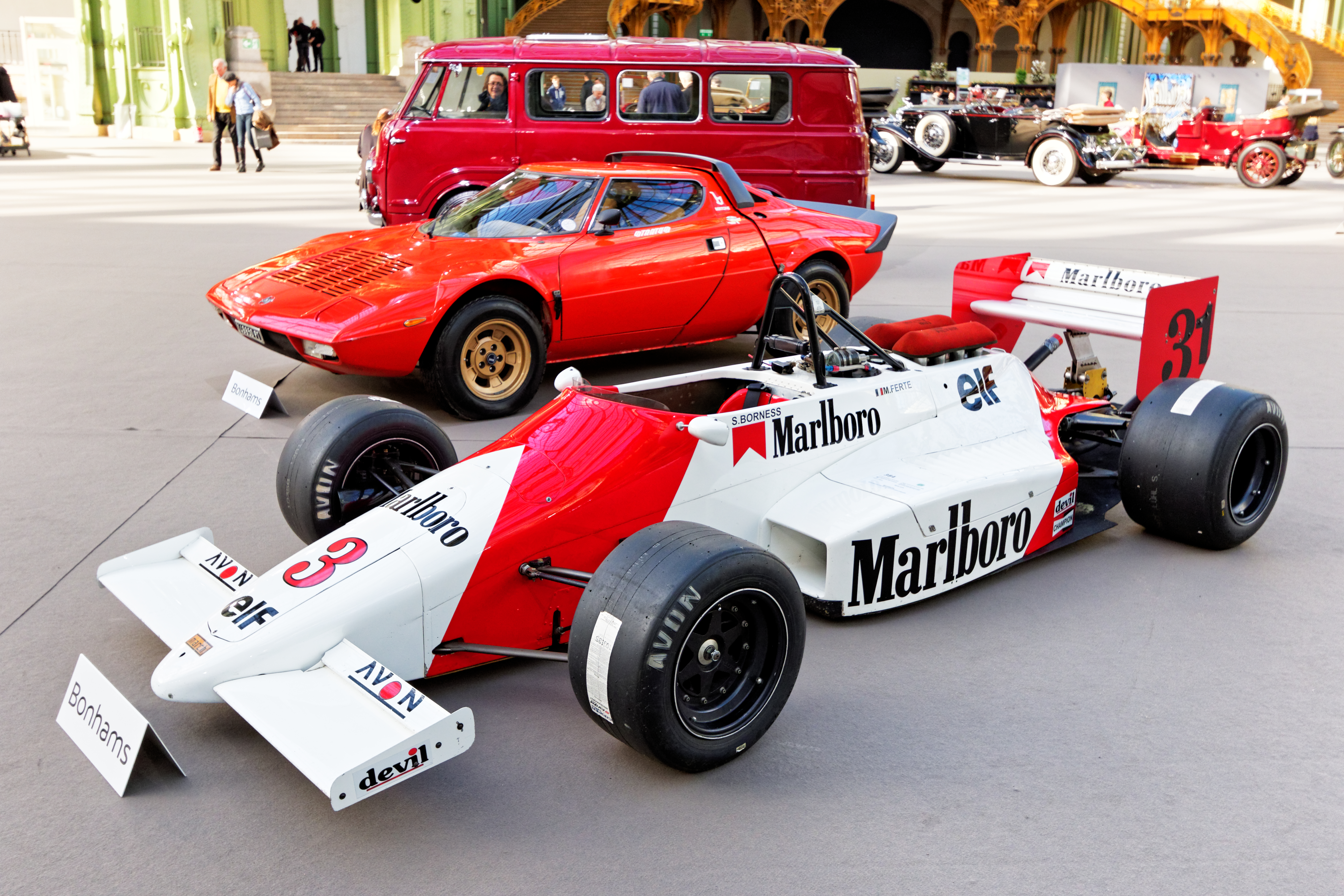
March 85B Formula 3000

During this phase, March Engines (a separate company within the group) undertook a number of bespoke customer projects - a highly modified BMW M1 (which was highly unsuccessful but provided some input into the later GTP/Group C cars) and an equally unsuccessful Indycar (the Orbitor) based around the 792 chassis.

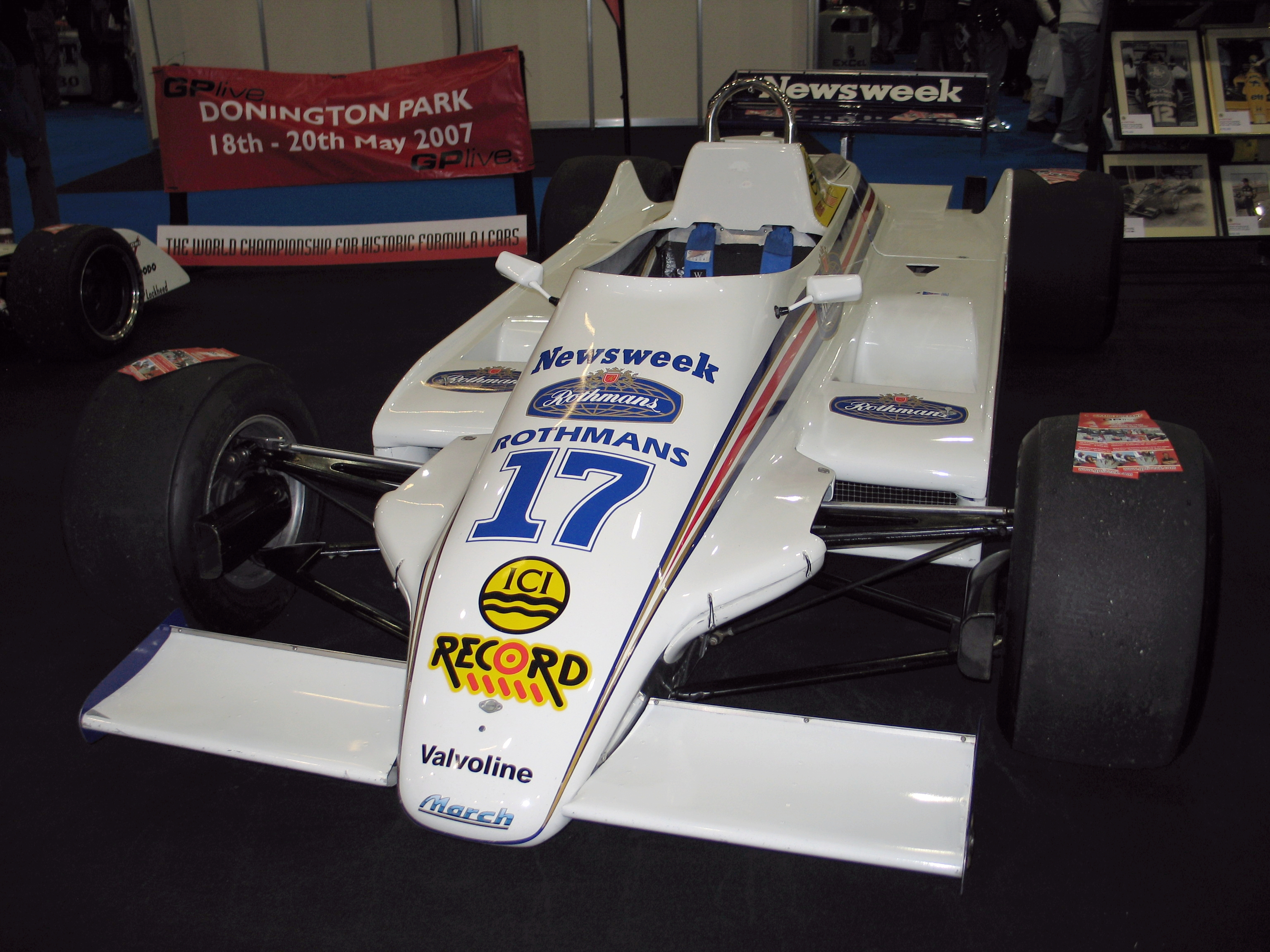
The March 821 from the 1982 season on display.

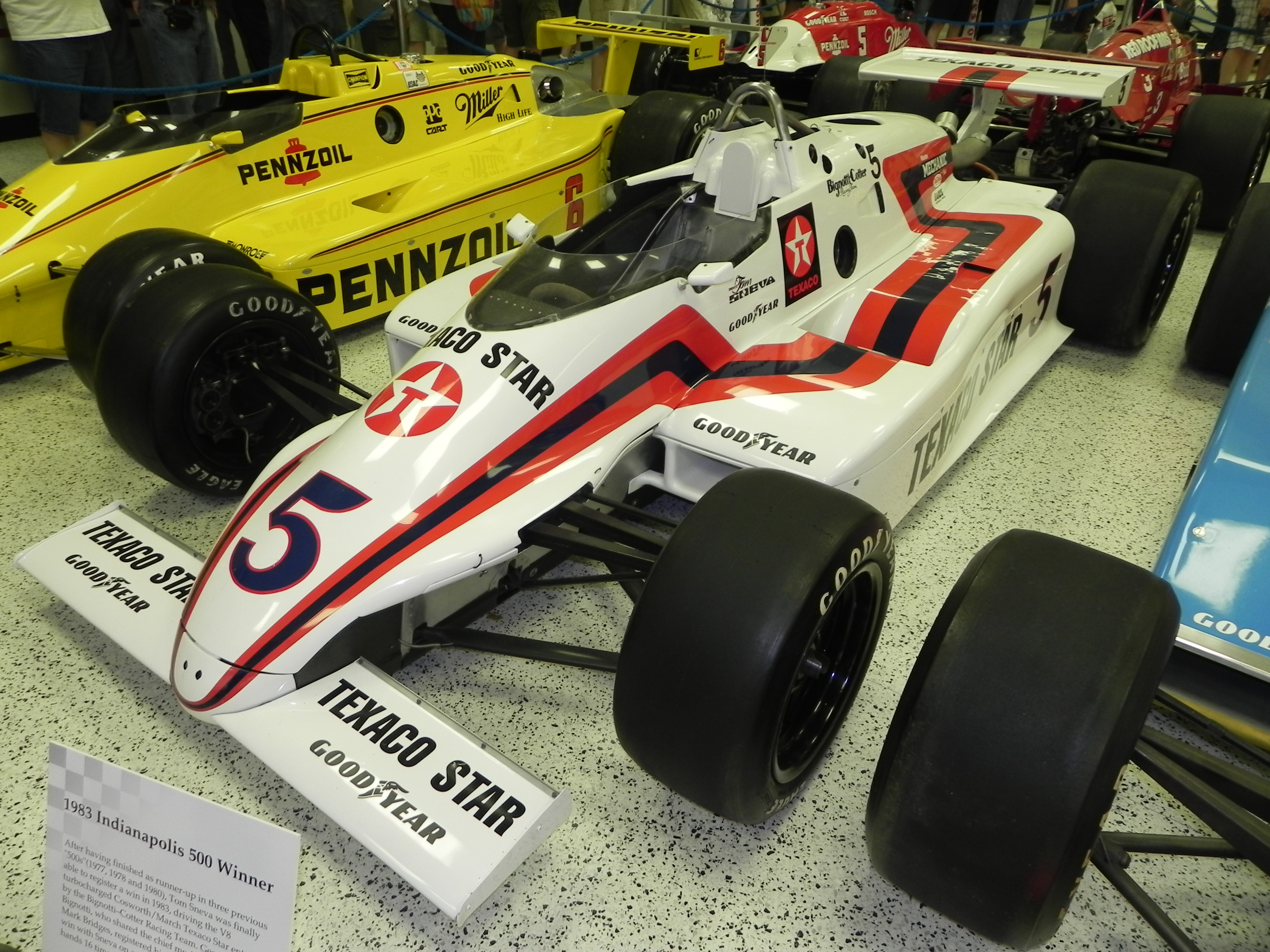
1983 March 83C Indy 500 winning chassis (driven by Tom Sneva)

March's attention in the early 1980s was mainly split between F2 and breaking into the Indy car market. It is a curious irony that although March's FW07 copy bombed in Formula One, when developed into the 81C Indycar it was instantly successful (largely down to George Bignotti's direct involvement in developing the car). Cosworth-powered Marches won the Indianapolis 500 five straight times between 1983 and 1987. The March 86C actually won the race twice in a row, 1986-1987. On the other hand, when Williams directly licensed the FW07 design to Bobby Hillin, the resultant Longhorn cars were a failure.

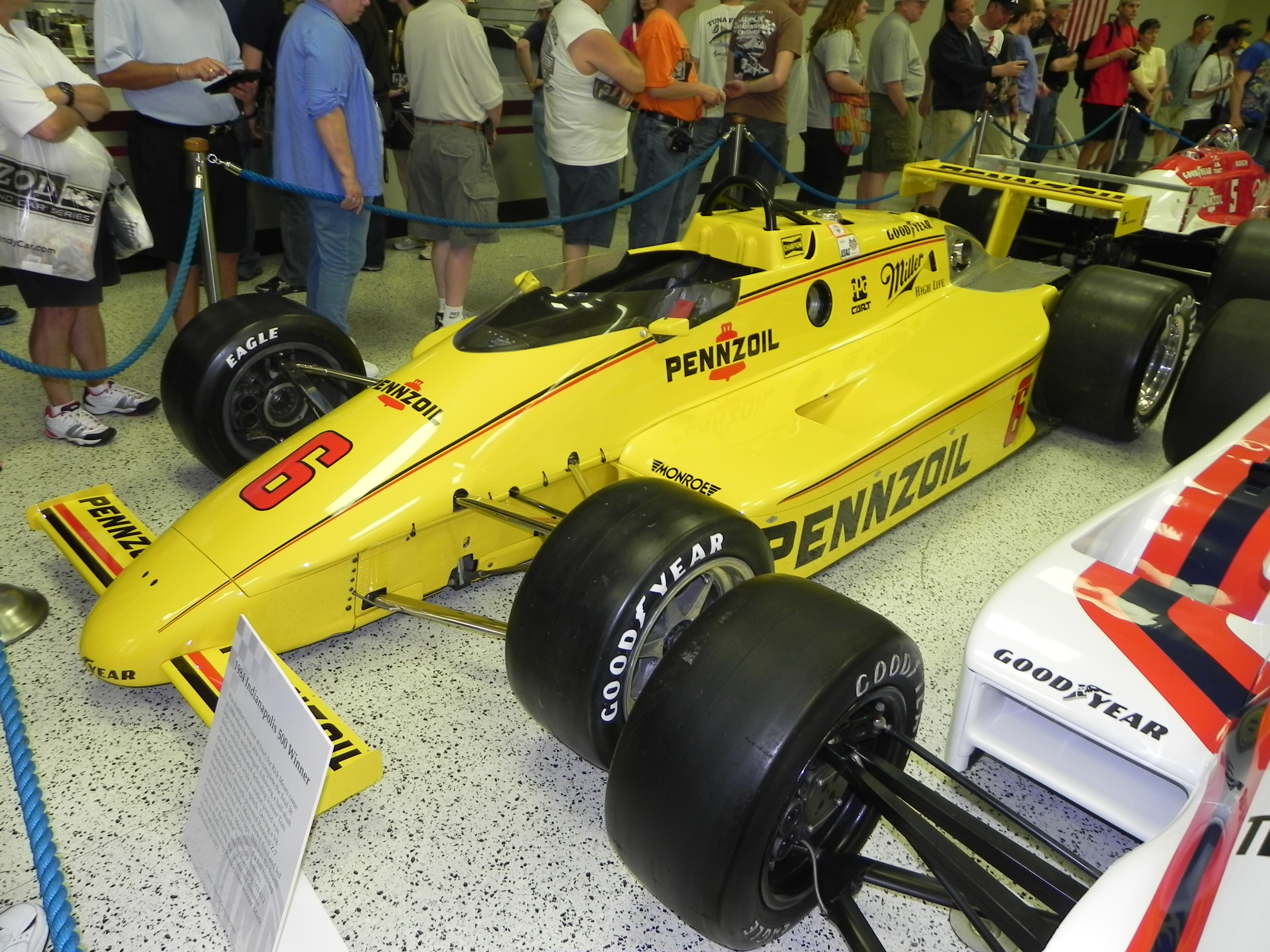
1984 March 84C Indy 500 winner of Rick Mears

An important sideline appeared when Group C and IMSA GTP racing started; March built a line of sports-prototypes descended from the unsuccessful BMW M1C, which, fitted with Porsche or Chevrolet engines, enjoyed considerable success in America (but less in Europe). The biggest success for March in sportscar racing was victory in the 1984 24 Hours of Daytona. A works BMW deal in IMSA suffered from engine problems but the cars were intermittently very fast.

In 1982, Corrado Fabi took March's last Formula Two title; the formula was being increasingly dominated by the works Ralt-Hondas. March abandoned the Formula Three market at the end of the 1981 season; they had enjoyed periods of dominance in the category, but this had faded in favour of Ralt, though. The margins on an F3 car were low and the factory could be more productively occupied building F2s and Indycars.

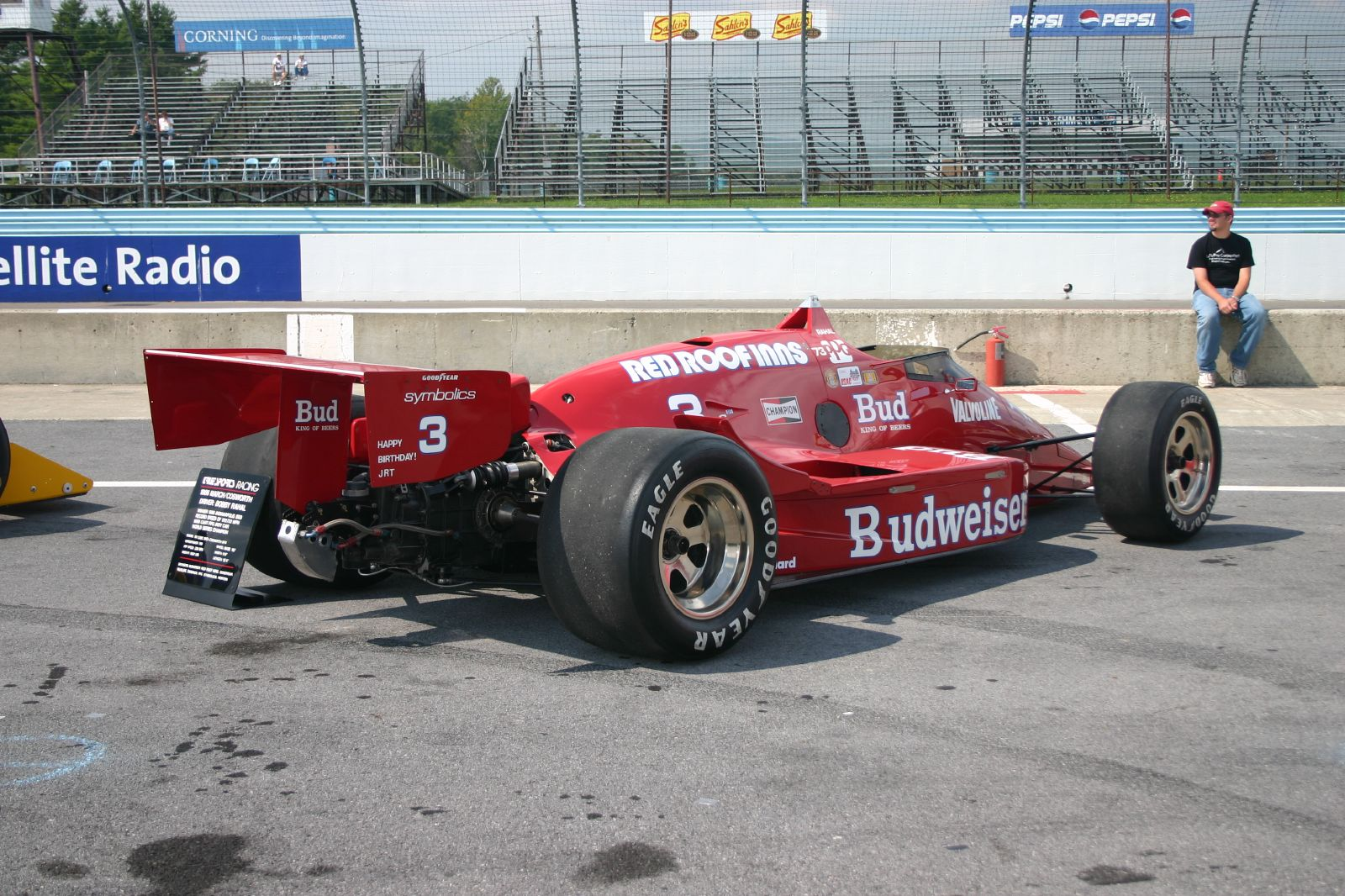
The Truesports March 86C driven by Bobby Rahal to the 1986 Indy 500 and CART championships

The new Formula 3000 in 1985 gave March much more success for the first few years of the formula, with Christian Danner being the first champion in a March chassis. He was followed in 1986 by Ivan Capelli and in 1987 by Stefano Modena. These early F3000s were little more than developments of the 842 F2 car (as were the Japanese F2 cars in 1985–86). In 1986, the 86G was modified into the BMW GTP by BMW North America for use in the IMSA GT Championship, but saw little success. Meanwhile, March became by far the dominant marque in Indycar racing, reaching the point where 30 out of 33 starters in the Indianapolis 500 were Marches. Into the late 1980s, the F3000 programme started to be eclipsed by Lola and Ralt, and was virtually obliterated by Reynard Motorsport's entry to the market.

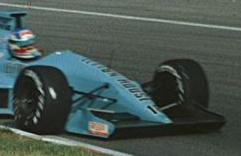
Ivan Capelli driving a March 881 at the 1988 Canadian Grand Prix.

March began a new Formula One program in 1987 with the Ford-engined 871 which was sponsored by Japanese real estate company Leyton House and driven by Ivan Capelli, who had brought his F3000 sponsor to the team (in fact, for the first race an F3000/F1 hybrid called the 87P had to be used as the 871 was not ready). In August 1987, Adrian Newey came to March F1 and designed the March-Judd 881 for Capelli and Maurício Gugelmin to drive. The car was a real success, scoring 22 points in 1988, including a second place at the 1988 Portuguese Grand Prix. It was the only normally aspirated car to lead a race in anger (Nigel Mansell in the Willams Judd had led away at the Brazilian Grand Prix after inheriting pole position - although was second by the first corner) - albeit briefly - during the season when Capelli passed the all-powerful McLaren-Honda turbo of Alain Prost on lap 16 during the Japanese Grand Prix (Prost missed a gear out of the chicane which allowed Capelli to lead over the line. Honda power told though as the Judd V8 could not match it for straight line speed). This was the first time since 1983 that a naturally-aspirated powered car had led a Grand Prix. The aerodynamics and ultra-slim monocoque of the 881 were copied by most of the grid in 1989 and the car launched Newey as a superstar designer.

In April 1987, March went public. Herd remained the biggest shareholder, and a block of shares was made over to key employees who had stayed with the company through thick and thin. March Group plc was initially valued at £14.5 million. But things were not going well in America, and when the dollar plunged against the pound that market dried up. In other formulae, too, March was no longer flavour of the month. Taken out of the hands of the racers, the company went downhill. The situation was resolved in early 1989 when Akira Akagi's Leyton House bought March Racing, including both the F1 operation and F3000 production facilities, leaving Herd to embark on other ventures.

== 1990s ==
March concentrated on high-value partnership deals, such as Porsche and Alfa Romeo Indycar (the Porsche deal led to some success; the Alfa project was unsuccessful), consultancy work on the Panther Solo supercar, composites, and wind tunnel businesses. The wind tunnel was a disaster, with the insulation being far too efficient - it was effectively a pressure cooker that generated useless results and this destroyed the competitiveness of various teams that used it, including Lotus. The economic downturn of the late 80s affected March's market severely and the management recognised that they were producing poor customer cars; the logical move was to merge with Ralt, with March becoming the brand for industry partnership deals, leaving Ralt to look after the production categories. This duly took place, although the businesses were never efficiently integrated.

=== Leyton House Racing ===
The F1 team raced as Leyton House Racing in 1990 and 1991, acquiring Ilmor V10 power. The team nearly caused a massive upset at the 1990 French Grand Prix with Capelli and Gugelmin capitalising on their superior aerodynamics and smooth race track to attempt the race on a single set of tyres while everyone else stopped for tyres mid-race. Engine problems claimed Gugelmin and slowed Capelli allowing Prost to slip by with three laps left. By the end of 1991, Akagi was immersed in the Fuji Bank scandal and Leyton House withdrew from racing. The team was bought by Ken Marrable, an associate of Akagi, and resumed the name March for the 1992 season but with little funding and results fell far short of expectations. The Leyton House Racing operation closed down as the team (now unconnected to the March group) attempted to assemble a project for the beginning of the 1993 season.

=== Demise ===
A complex series of buyouts and sales saw the March group (now essentially a financial services outfit) divest itself of its racing interests; after a management buyout, March and Ralt were subsequently sold to Andrew Fitton and Steve Ward in the early 1990s. Fitton later wound March up and Ward continued Ralt at a lower level. In the late 1990s the engineering assets of March were sold to Andy Gilberg. This consisted of over 30,000 engineering drawings and design rights for the customer cars, works F1 cars from the 1970s and other projects produced at the Murdock Road facility. These records are currently available to car owners, racing services providers and historians through www.marchives.com.

== 2000s ==
March Racing Organisation Ltd made an application to compete in the 2010 Formula One season under the March Racing Organisation banner, in May 2009. The entry was made when a forty-five million Euros budget cap was being considered for Formula One, to allow less well-funded teams to be competitive with the frontrunners. MRO's entry consisted of just the name; with the March team inactive since 1992 a factory and team would have had to be assembled in the eight months before the start of the season.

== Car designations ==
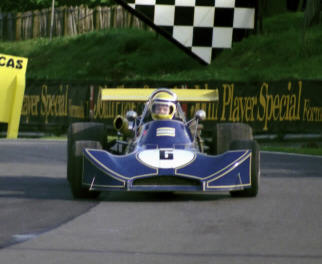
March 73B Formula Atlantic

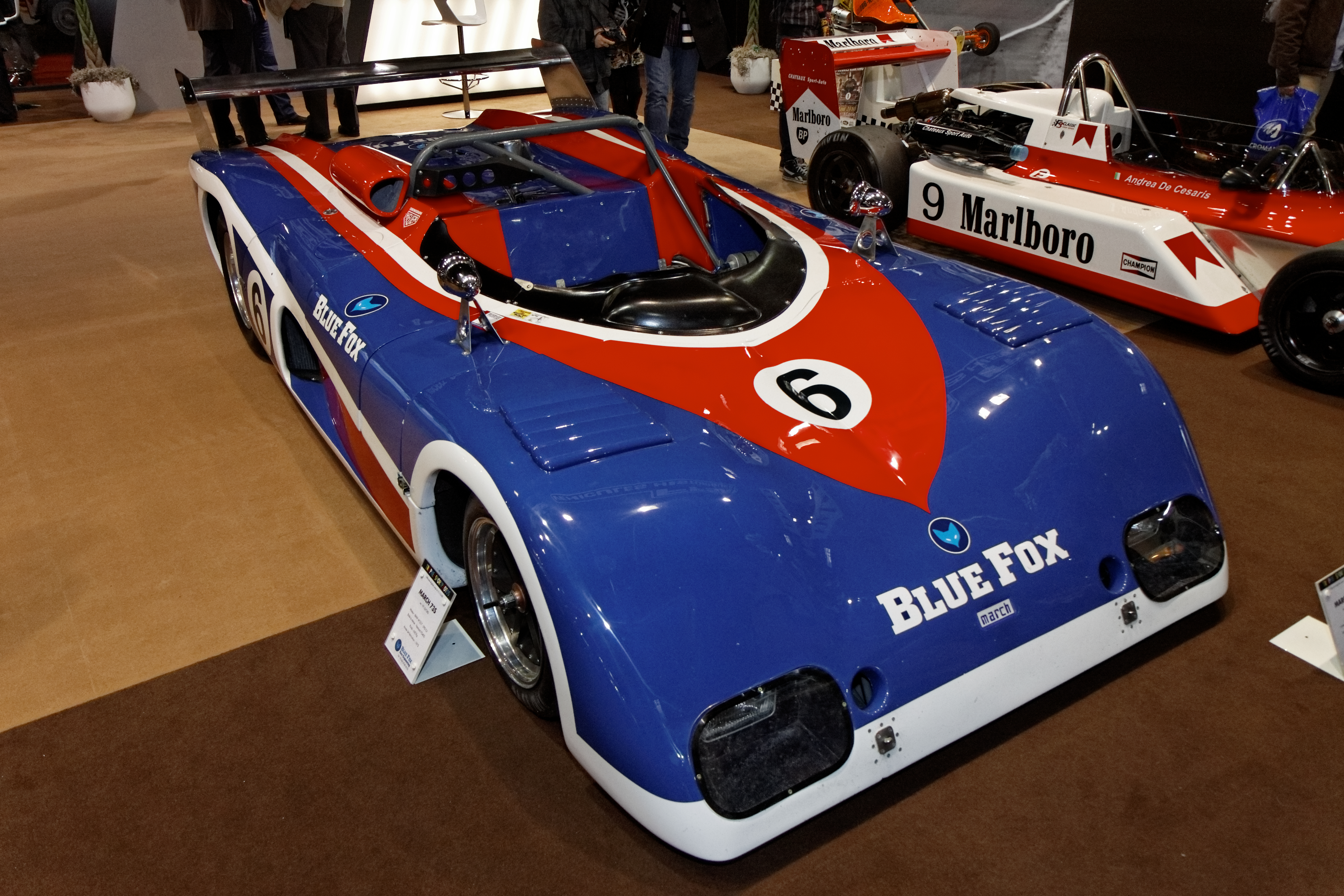
March 73S Group 5/6 2-litre sports prototype

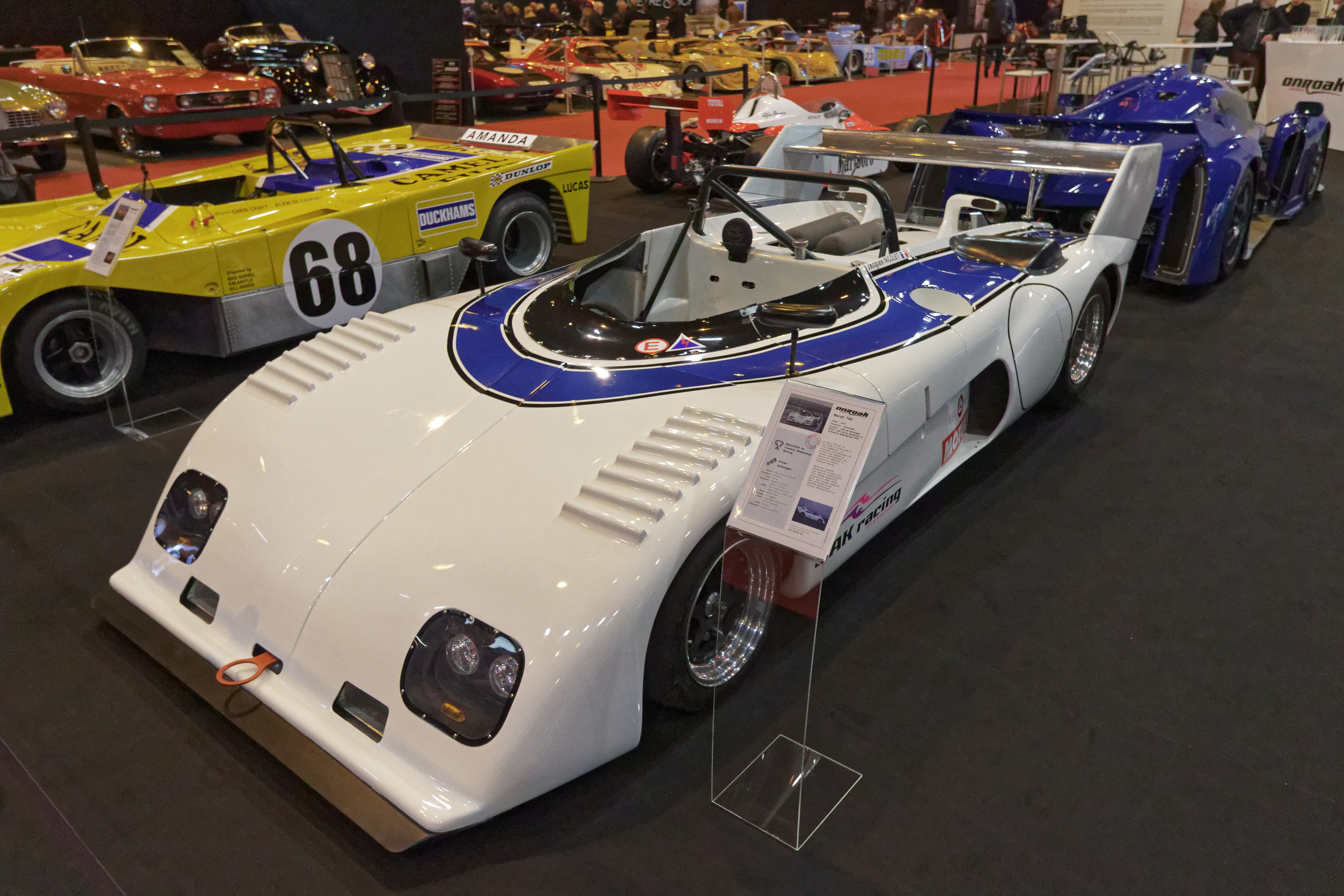
March 74S Group 5

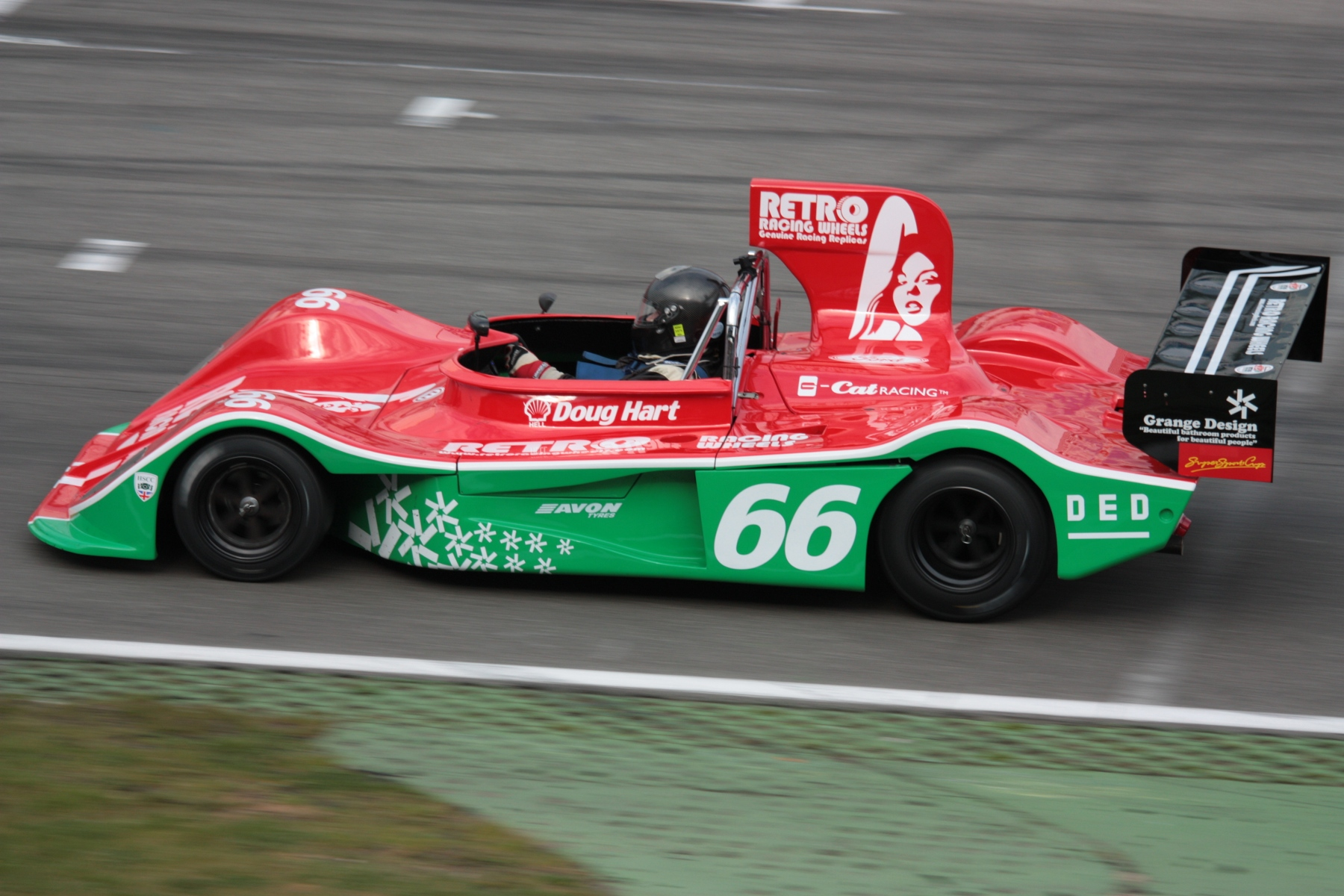
March 75S Group 5

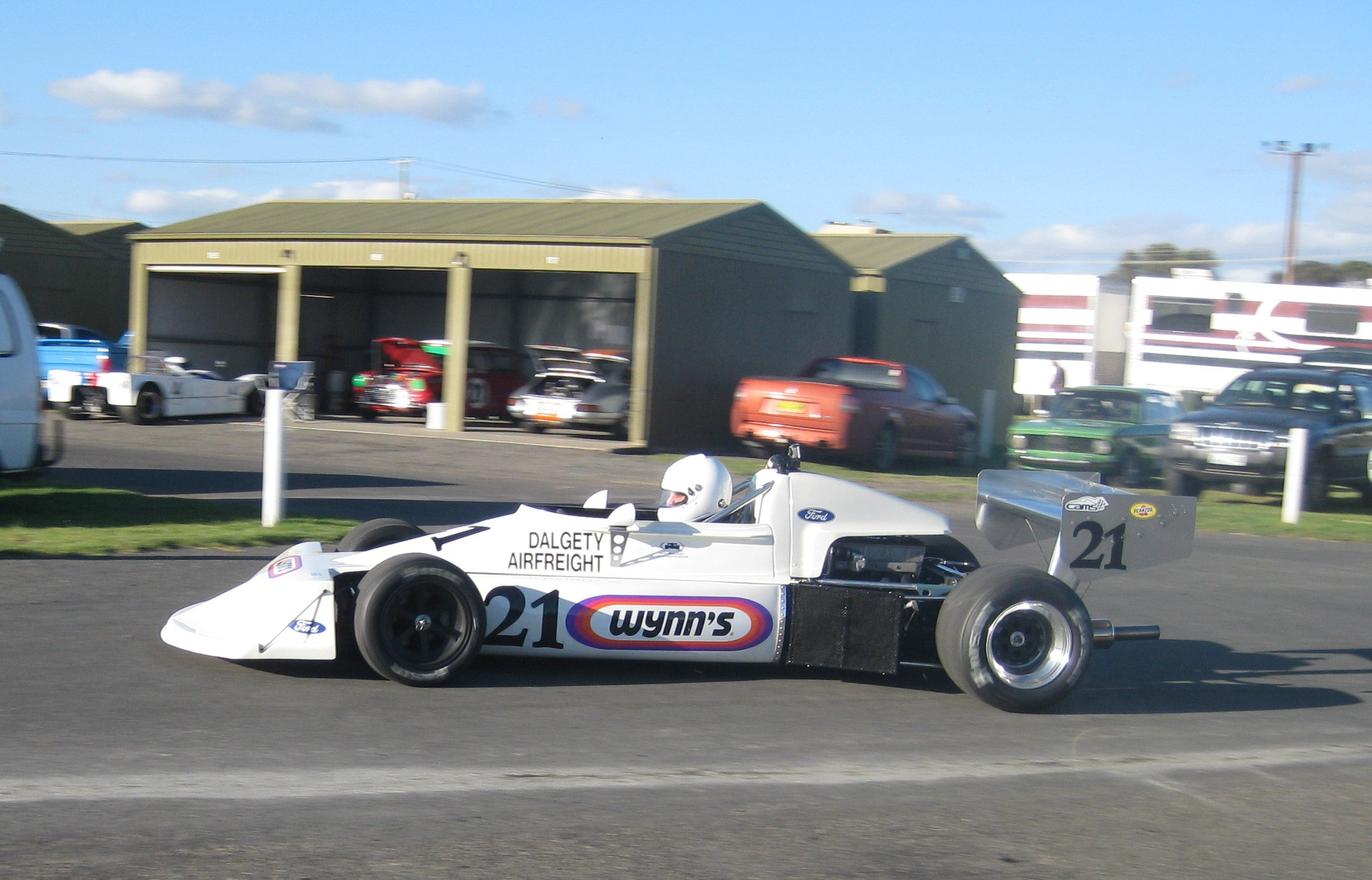
March 77B Formula Atlantic

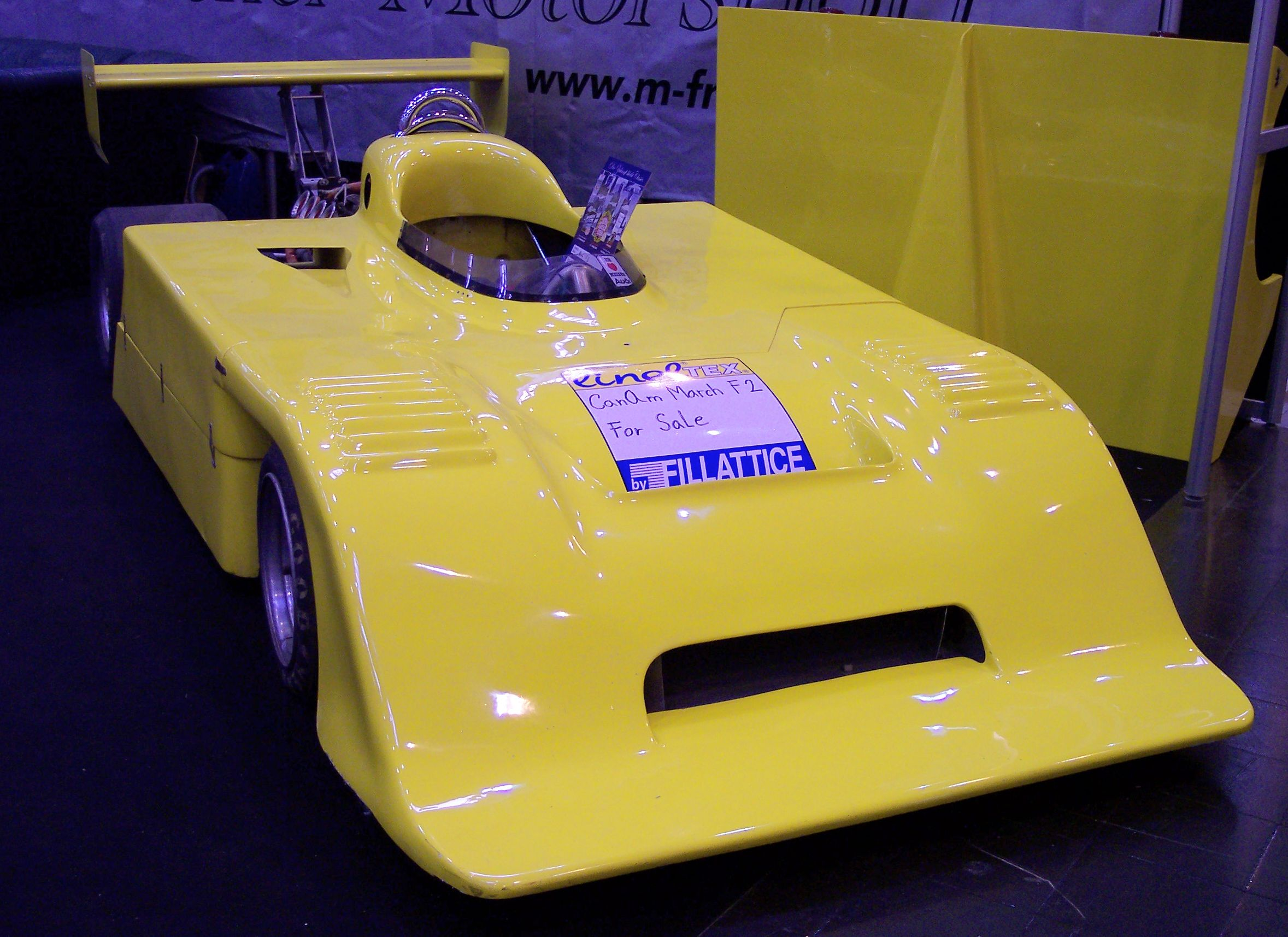
March F2 Can-Am

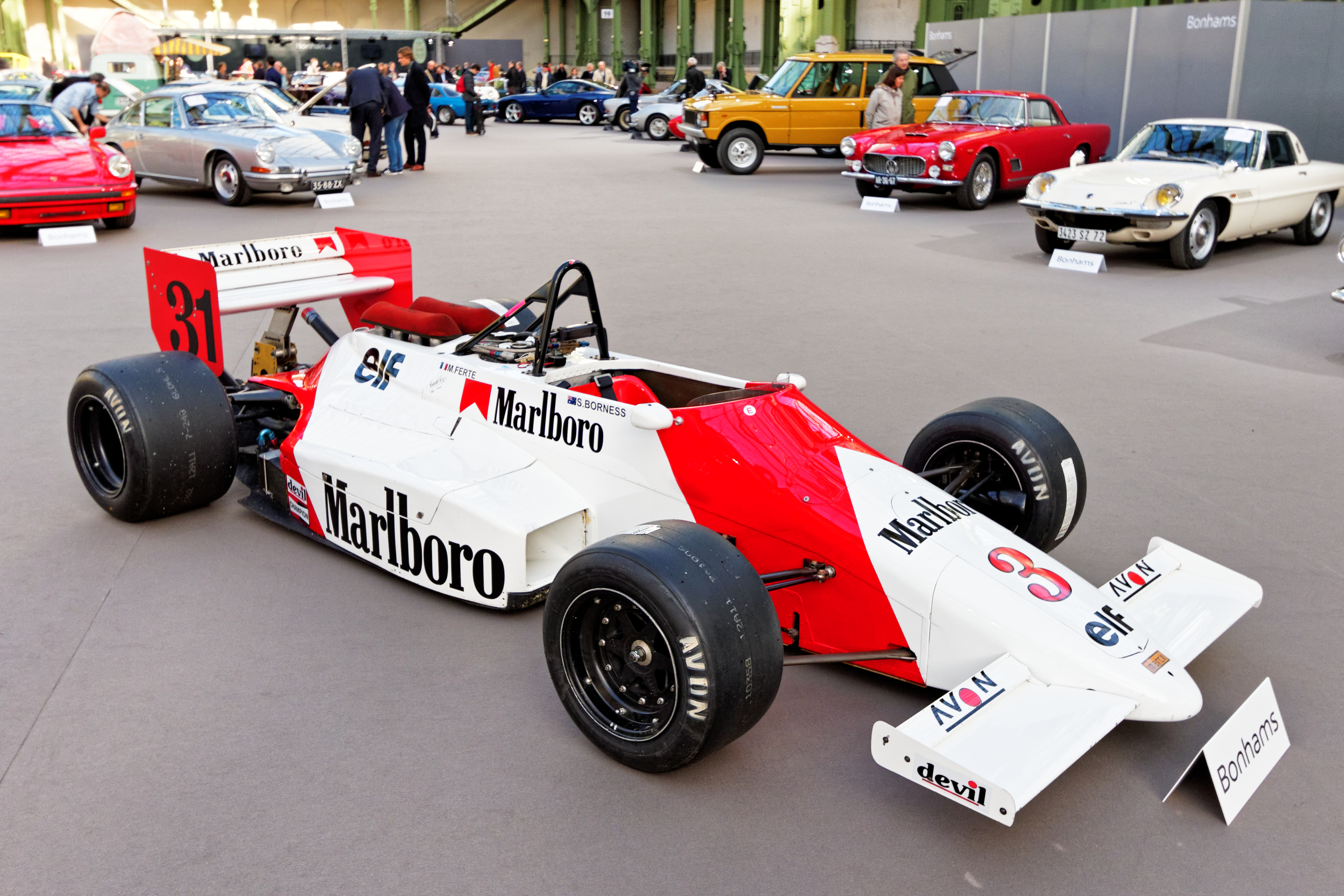
March 85B Formula 3000

March's cars generally followed a simple designation scheme in which the first two digits correspond to the year (69–91), and the third digit or letter corresponds to the formula. Some peculiarities emerged, which are documented below. There were some minor exceptions to these rules, for example xx5 designated both some very early Formula B/Atlantic cars, some early F5000s and some early 2-litre sports cars.

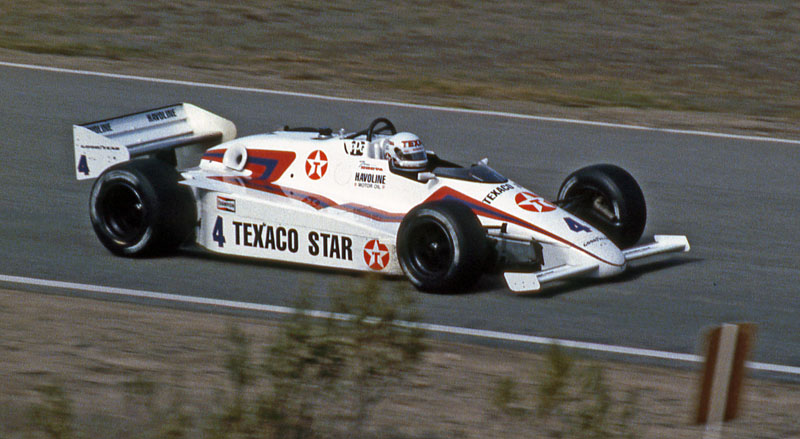
March 83C CART IndyCar

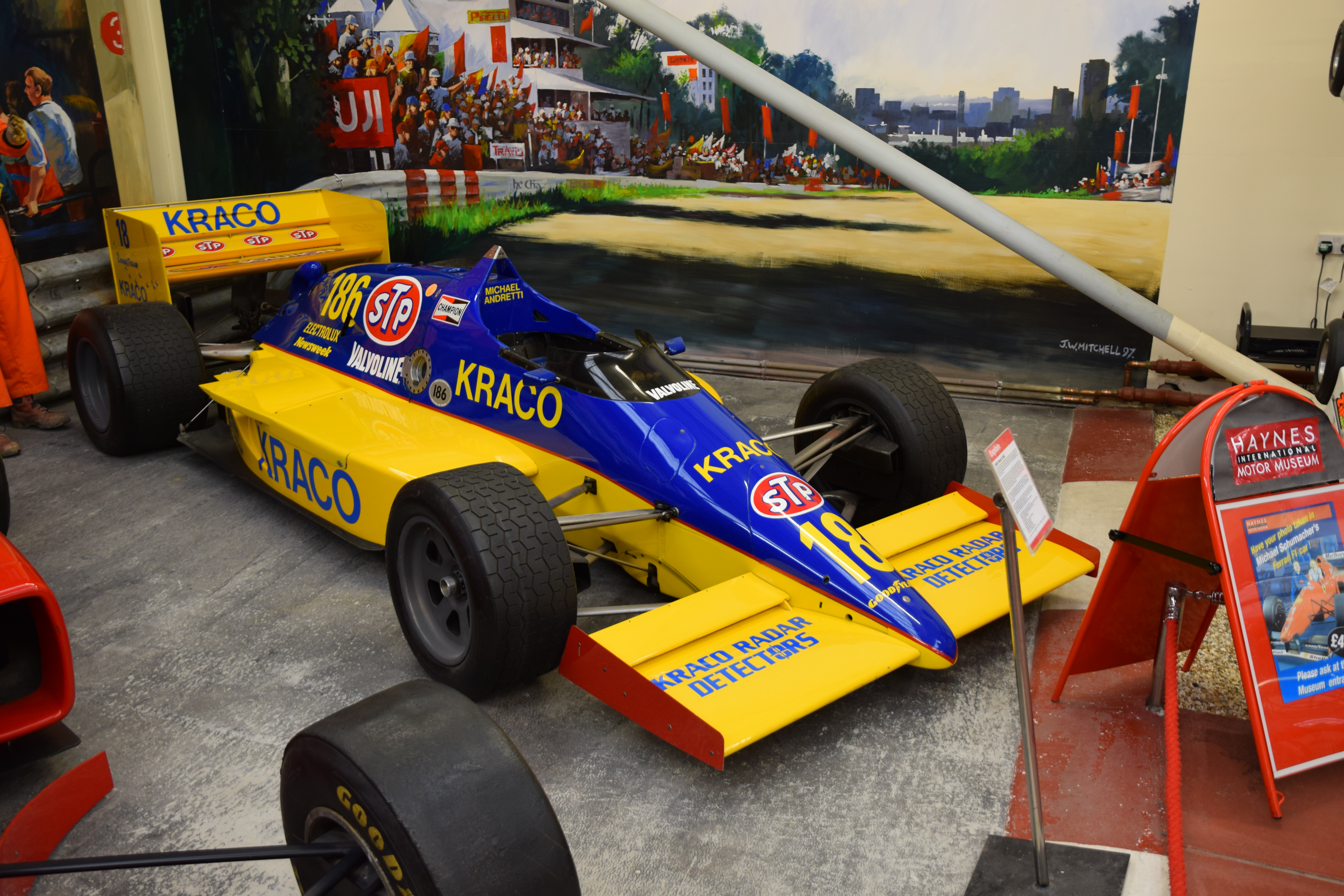
March 86C CART IndyCar

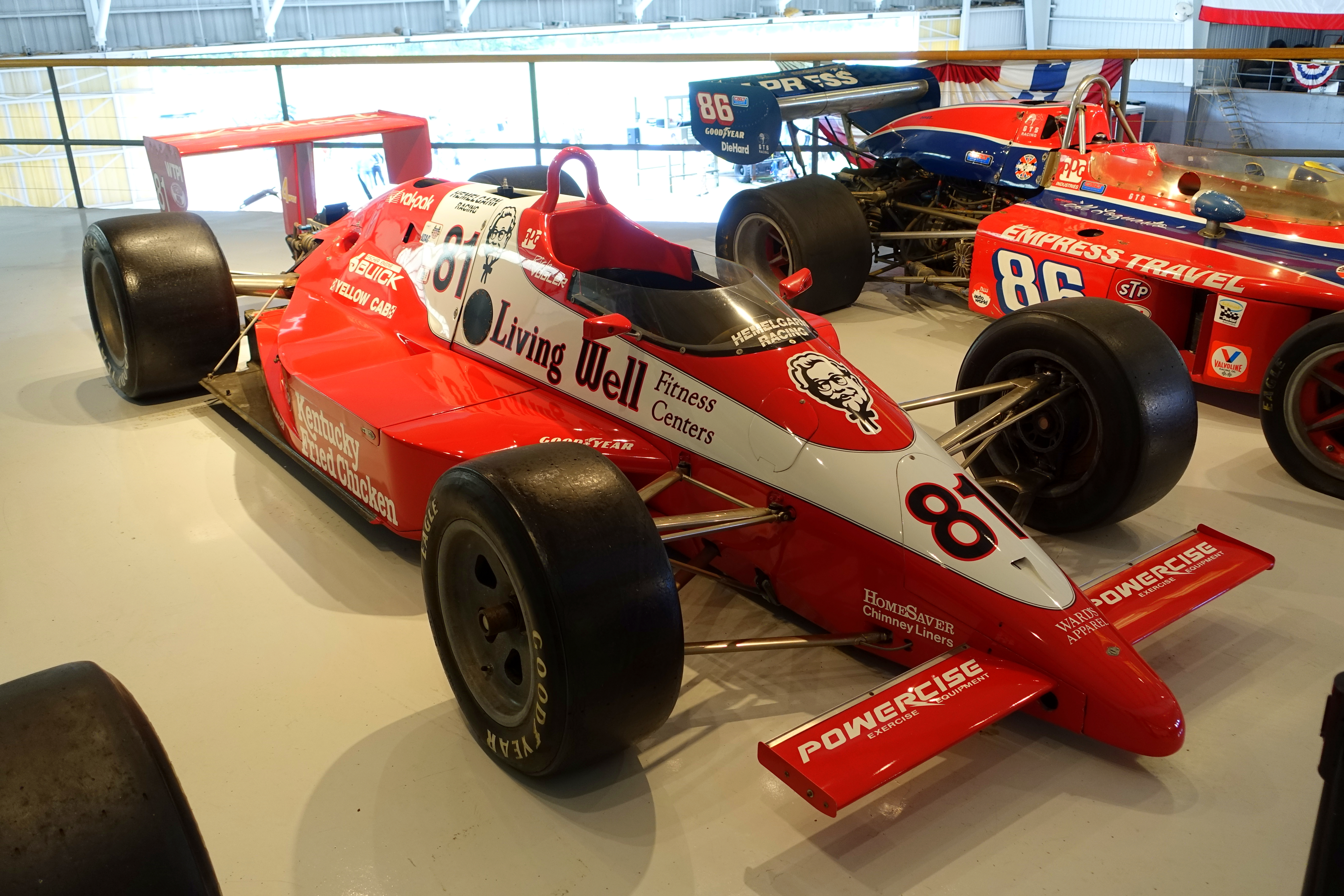
March 87C CART IndyCar

- Formula One – 701–781, 811–821, 871–881. Subsequent March F1 cars took the CG prefix after Cesare Gariboldi, a Leyton House March team manager who was killed in a road accident in 1989: CG891, CG901, CG911. Note that, during 1972, three distinct F1 cars appeared: 721, 721X (low-polar-moment) and 721G (F2-based). At the start of the 1987 season, the team ran the 87P/87B, a hybrid F1/F3000 car.
- Formula Two – 702–842. Japanese F2 cars in 1985-86 were designated 85J and 86J. A 772P appeared in 1977 based on an old Atlantic chassis as a prototype for the 782.
- Formula 3000 – 85B - 89B
- Formula Three – 693–813. In 1971, two types of F3 car were made, a spaceframe and a monocoque, these were designated 713S and 713M.
- Can-Am/Interserie Group 7 – 707, 717, 817, 827, 832, 847
- 2-litre sports prototypes – 73S - 77S; Sports 2000 81S-84S
- Indy car/Championship car – 81C - 89C. Bespoke cars for Porsche took the 89P and 90P designations; bespoke cars for Alfa Romeo took the 89CE designation.
- Formula 5000 – 72A - 76A
- Formula Atlantic – 73B - 79B
- Formula Ford (UK) – 708 - 718
- Formula Ford (US) – 709 - 729
- Formula Renault – 75R
- IMSA GTP/Group C – 80G - 87G, 88S, 92S. 'N' and 'S' designations used for Nissan cars.

== Racecars ==
| Year | Car | Category |
|---|---|---|
| 1969 | March 693 | Formula Three |
| 1970 | March 701 | Formula One |
| 1970 | March 702 | Formula Two |
| 1970 | March 703 | Formula Three |
| 1970 | March 707 | Group 7 |
| 1971 | March 711 | Formula One |
| 1971 | March 712 | Formula Two |
| 1971 | March 713 | Formula Three |
| 1971 | March 717 | Group 7 |
| 1972 | March 72A | Formula 5000 |
| 1972 | March 721 | Formula One |
| 1972 | March 721X | Formula One |
| 1972 | March 721G | Formula One |
| 1972 | March 722 | Formula Two; Formula Atlantic |
| 1972 | March 723 | Formula Three |
| 1973 | March 73A | Formula 5000 |
| 1973 | March 73B | Formula Atlantic |
| 1973 | March 73S | Group 5 |
| 1973 | March 731 | Formula One |
| 1973 | March 732 | Formula Two |
| 1973 | March 733 | Formula Three |
| 1974 | March 74A | Formula 5000 |
| 1974 | March 74B | Formula Atlantic |
| 1974 | March 74S | Group 5 |
| 1974 | March 741 | Formula One |
| 1974 | March 742 | Formula Two |
| 1974 | March 743 | Formula Three, FJ1300 |
| 1975 | March 75A | Formula 5000 |
| 1975 | March 75S | Group 5 |
| 1975 | March 751 | Formula One |
| 1975 | March 752 | Formula Two |
| 1975 | March 753 | Formula Three, FJ1300 |
| 1976 | March 2-4-0 | Unraced F1 Prototype |
| 1976 | March 76A | Formula 5000 |
| 1976 | March 76B | Formula Atlantic |
| 1976 | March 76S | Group 6 |
| 1976 | March 761 | Formula One |
| 1976 | March 762 | Formula Two |
| 1976 | March 763 | Formula Three |
| 1977 | March 77S | Group 6 |
| 1977 | March 771 | Formula One |
| 1977 | March 772 | Formula Two |
| 1977 | March 773 | Formula Three |
| 1978 | March 781 | Formula One |
| 1978 | March 782 | Formula Two |
| 1978 | March 783 | Formula Three |
| 1979 | March 79B | Formula Atlantic |
| 1979 | March 792 | Formula Two |
| 1979 | March 793 | Formula Three |
| 1980 | March 802 | Formula Two |
| 1980 | March 803 | Formula Three |
| 1981 | March 81C | IndyCar |
| 1981 | March 81S | Sports 2000 |
| 1981 | March 811 | Formula One |
| 1981 | March 813 | Formula Three |
| 1981 | March 817 | Can-Am |
| 1982 | Dome RC82 | Group C |
| 1982 | March 82A | Formula Atlantic |
| 1982 | March 82C | IndyCar |
| 1982 | March 82G | Group C |
| 1982 | March 82S | Sports 2000 |
| 1982 | March 821 | Formula One |
| 1982 | March 822 | Formula Two |
| 1982 | March 827 | Can-Am |
| 1983 | March 83C | IndyCar |
| 1983 | March 83G | Group C |
| 1983 | March 83S | Sports 2000 |
| 1983 | March 832 | Formula Two |
| 1984 | March 84C | IndyCar |
| 1984 | March 84G | Group C |
| 1984 | March 84S | Sports 2000 |
| 1984 | March 842 | Formula Two |
| 1984 | March 847 | Can-Am |
| 1985 | March 85B | Formula 3000 |
| 1985 | March 85C | IndyCar |
| 1985 | March 85G | Group C |
| 1985 | March 85J | Formula Two |
| 1986 | March 86A | Indy Lights |
| 1986 | March 86B | Formula 3000 |
| 1986 | March 86C | IndyCar |
| 1986 | March 86G | Group C |
| 1986 | March 86J | Formula Two |
| 1987 | March 87B | Formula 3000 |
| 1987 | March 87C | IndyCar |
| 1987 | March 87P | Formula One |
| 1987 | March 871 | Formula One |
| 1987 | Nissan R87E | Group C |
| 1988 | March 88B | Formula 3000 |
| 1988 | March 88C | IndyCar |
| 1988 | March 881 | Formula One |
| 1988 | Nissan R88C | Group C |
| 1989 | March 89C | IndyCar |
| 1989 | March 89CE | IndyCar |
| 1989 | March 89P | IndyCar |
| 1989 | March CG891 | Formula One |
| 1990 | March 90P | IndyCar |
| 1991 | Leyton House CG911 | Formula One |

== Formula One results ==
Results achieved by the 'works' March team.

| Season | Entrant | Car | Tyres | Engine | Drivers | Constructors Championship |
|---|---|---|---|---|---|---|
| 1970 | March Engineering | March 701 | F | Cosworth DFV | Chris Amon; Jo Siffert | 3rd (48 pts) (see Note 1) |
| 1971 | STP March Racing Team | March 711 | F | Alfa Romeo; Cosworth DFV | Ronnie Peterson; Alex Soler-Roig; Andrea de Adamich; Nanni Galli; Niki Lauda; Jean-Pierre Jarier; Mike Beuttler | 4th (33 pts) |
| 1972 | March Racing Team | March 721; March 721X; March 721G | G | Cosworth DFV | Ronnie Peterson; Niki Lauda | 6th (15 pts) (see Note 2) |
| 1973 | March Racing Team | March 731 (actually rebuilt 721G) | G | Cosworth DFV | Jean-Pierre Jarier; Henri Pescarolo; Roger Williamson | 5th (14 pts) (see Note 3) |
| 1974 | March Engineering | March 741 | G | Cosworth DFV | Hans-Joachim Stuck; Howden Ganley; Vittorio Brambilla; Reine Wisell | 9th (6 pts) |
| 1975 | March Engineering; Beta Team March; Lavazza March | March 751; March 741 | G | Cosworth DFV | Lella Lombardi; Vittorio Brambilla; Hans-Joachim Stuck | 8th (7.5 pts) (see Note 4) |
| 1976 | March Engineering Beta Team March | March 761 | G | Cosworth DFV | Ronnie Peterson; Hans-Joachim Stuck; Vittorio Brambilla | 7th (19 pts) |
| 1977 | Team Rothmans International; Hollywood March Racing | March 761B; March 771 | G | Cosworth DFV | Ian Scheckter; Alex Ribeiro; Hans-Joachim Stuck; Brian Henton | NC (0 pts) |
| 1981 | March Grand Prix Team | March 811 | A M | Cosworth DFV | Eliseo Salazar; Derek Daly | NC (0 pts) |
| 1982 | March Grand Prix; Rothmans March Grand Prix Team; LBT Team March | March 821 | A P | Cosworth DFV | Raul Boesel; Jochen Mass; Rupert Keegan; Emilio de Villota | NC (0 pts) |
| 1987 | Leyton House March Racing Team | March 87P (1st race only); March 871 | G | Cosworth DFZ | Ivan Capelli | 13th (1 pt) |
| 1988 | Leyton House March Racing Team | March 881 | G | Judd | Ivan Capelli; Maurício Gugelmin | 6th (22 pts) |
| 1989 | Leyton House March Racing Team | March 881; March CG891 | G | Judd | Ivan Capelli; Maurício Gugelmin | 12th (4 pts) |
| 1990 | Competed as Leyton House Racing | | | | | |
| 1991 | Competed as Leyton House Racing | | | | | |
| 1992 | March F1 | March CG911B | G | Ilmor | Paul Belmondo; Karl Wendlinger; Emanuele Naspetti; Jan Lammers | 9th (3 pts) |

- Note 1: 1970 total includes points gained by Jackie Stewart, Johnny Servoz-Gavin and François Cevert in Tyrrell Racing Organisation entries
- Note 2: 1972 total includes points gained by Carlos Pace in a Team Williams Motul entry
- Note 3: 1973 total includes points gained by James Hunt in a Hesketh Racing entry
- Note 4: 1974 total includes points gained by Mark Donohue in a Penske Cars entry

== Bibliography ==
- Four Guys And A Telephone, Mike Lawrence, MRP
- March: The Grand Prix and Indy Cars, Alan Henry, Hazleton

== Related links ==
- Extensive March Engineering history site
- Article about the March 2-4-0
- March 711 History
- March Engineering - At IMDb
