= March 713 =

March 713S March 713M
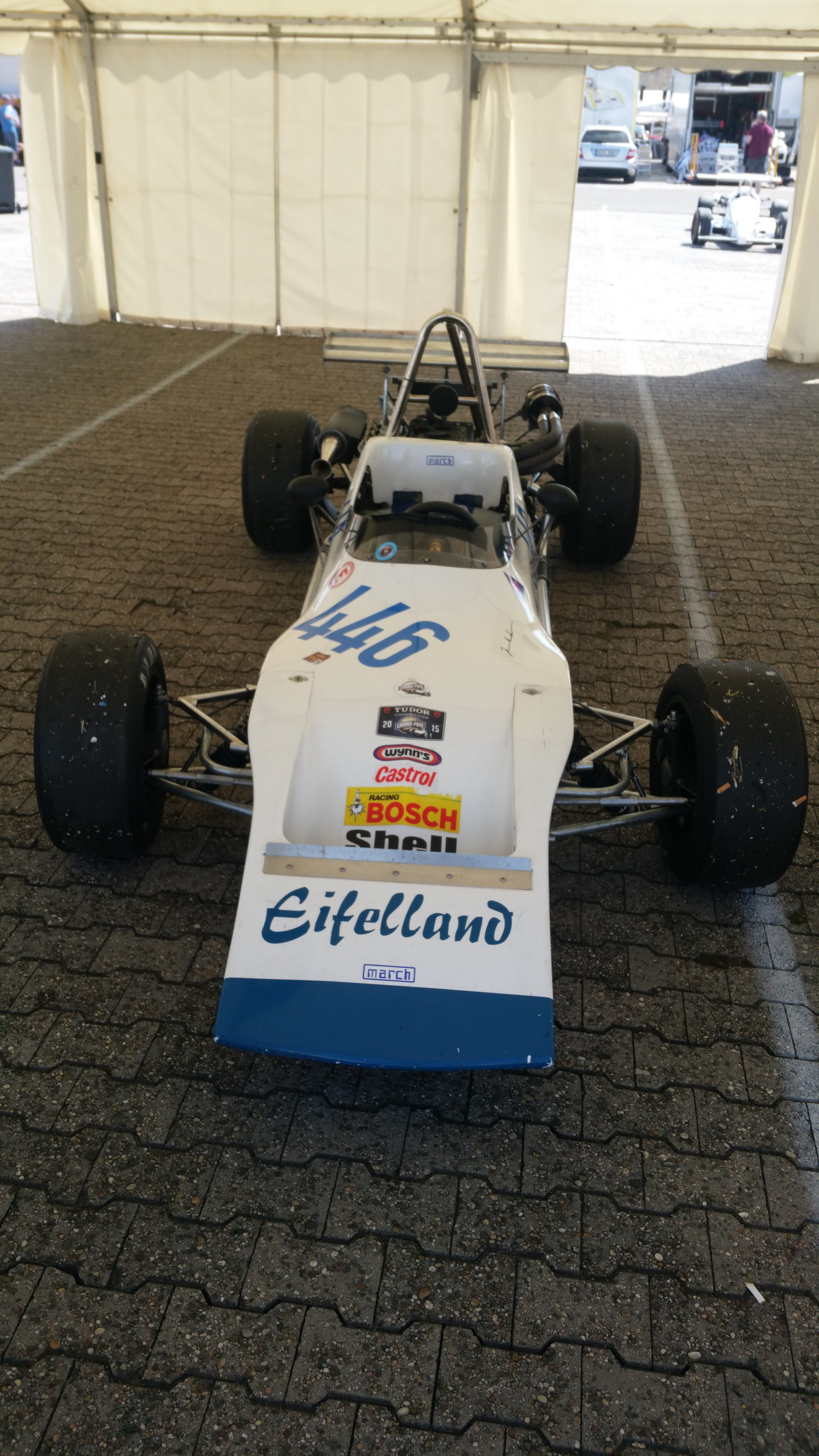
- Predecessor: March 703
- Successor: March 723

Technical specifications
- Chassis: Monocoque (713M); Space frame (713S)
- Transmission: Hewland 4-speed manual

Competition history
- Notable drivers: (United Kingdom) James Hunt (United Kingdom) Roger Williamson

The March 713 was a Formula 3 racing car designed, developed, and built by March Engineering in 1970, and used from 1971.

== Development ==
For the first time, the tubular space frame was replaced by a GRP monocoque, which initially caused some stability problems. The vehicles were equipped with Toyota and BMW engines, the latter being inferior to the double camshaft engines of the Japanese due to the single camshaft principle.

Even the inexpensive use of mass-produced parts such as the central throttle valve of the BMW 3.0 CSi did not necessarily contribute to the competitiveness of the straight engine from the BMW 2002, which had its problems primarily in terms of torque. Flanged to this was a 5-speed Hewland Mk.IV gearbox, which initially sent power to the rear wheels via Hardy discs on the driveshafts (which were often later replaced by CV joints).

Just like its successor, the 723, the vehicle was not very successful; it was only with the 733 that the type became more mature and successful.
