= March 817 =

- Category: Can-Am
- Constructor: March Engineering
- Successor: March 827

Technical specifications
- Engine: Chevrolet 5,000 cc (305.1 cu in) V8 engine naturally-aspirated mid-engined
- Tyres: Goodyear

Competition history
- Notable entrants: Paul Newman Racing
- Notable drivers: Teo Fabi; Al Unser; Bobby Rahal
- Debut: 1981 Can-Am Mosport Park
Races	Wins
10	4
- Teams' Championships: 1: (1981 Can-Am)

The March 817 was a British sports prototype racing car, built by March Engineering in 1981 for the Can-Am series. As with all other full-size Can-Am cars of the time, it used a mid-mounted 5-litre, naturally-aspirated Chevrolet V8 engine. Two cars are known to have been built. Paul Newman Racing won the Team's championship of the Can-Am series in 1981 with the March 817, whilst their main driver, Teo Fabi took second in the driver's standings.

== Racing history ==
Both March 817s were bought by Paul Newman Racing, with Al Unser and Teo Fabi initially being selected to drive them. The car made its first appearance in the first round of the 1981 Can-Am season, held at Mosport Park; Unser retired due to brake failure after 12 laps, but Fabi won the race. Unser wasn't present at Mid Ohio, but Fabi won again in a close race. Unser returned at Watkins Glen, but the weekend proved to be unsuccessful; damage to the rear end of his car forced Unser out after 16 laps, and Fabi retired with a blown engine five laps later. Road America saw Unser finish third, for his first podium of the season; however, Fabi crashed in practice and was unable to compete in the race. Edmonton was another unsuccessful event; Unser blew his engine after 25 laps, and Fabi span out after 48 laps. Unser left the team before the Trois-Rivières, and Fabi brought his March 817 home in fourth place. The series then returned to Mosport Park, and Bobby Rahal joined the team; the pair took a one-two finish, with Fabi finishing just five-hundredths of a second ahead of Rahal. Riverside saw Paul Newman Racing suffer another pair of retirements; Rahal suffered suspension failure after 19 laps, and Fabi's car lost a wheel two laps later. The penultimate round of the Can-Am season was held at Laguna Seca Raceway, where Fabi won the race, and Rahal finished in ninth place. Caesars Palace held the final round of the season, where Fabi finished second, and Rahal finished fourth. Despite taking two more wins than Geoff Brabham, Fabi was only able to finish second to him in the driver's standings; whilst Rahal finished eighth, and Unser in 13th. Paul Newman Racing did, however, manage to win the Team's championship. The car was not used again, and was replaced by the March 827 for 1982.
