= March 783/793 =

Formula Three cars

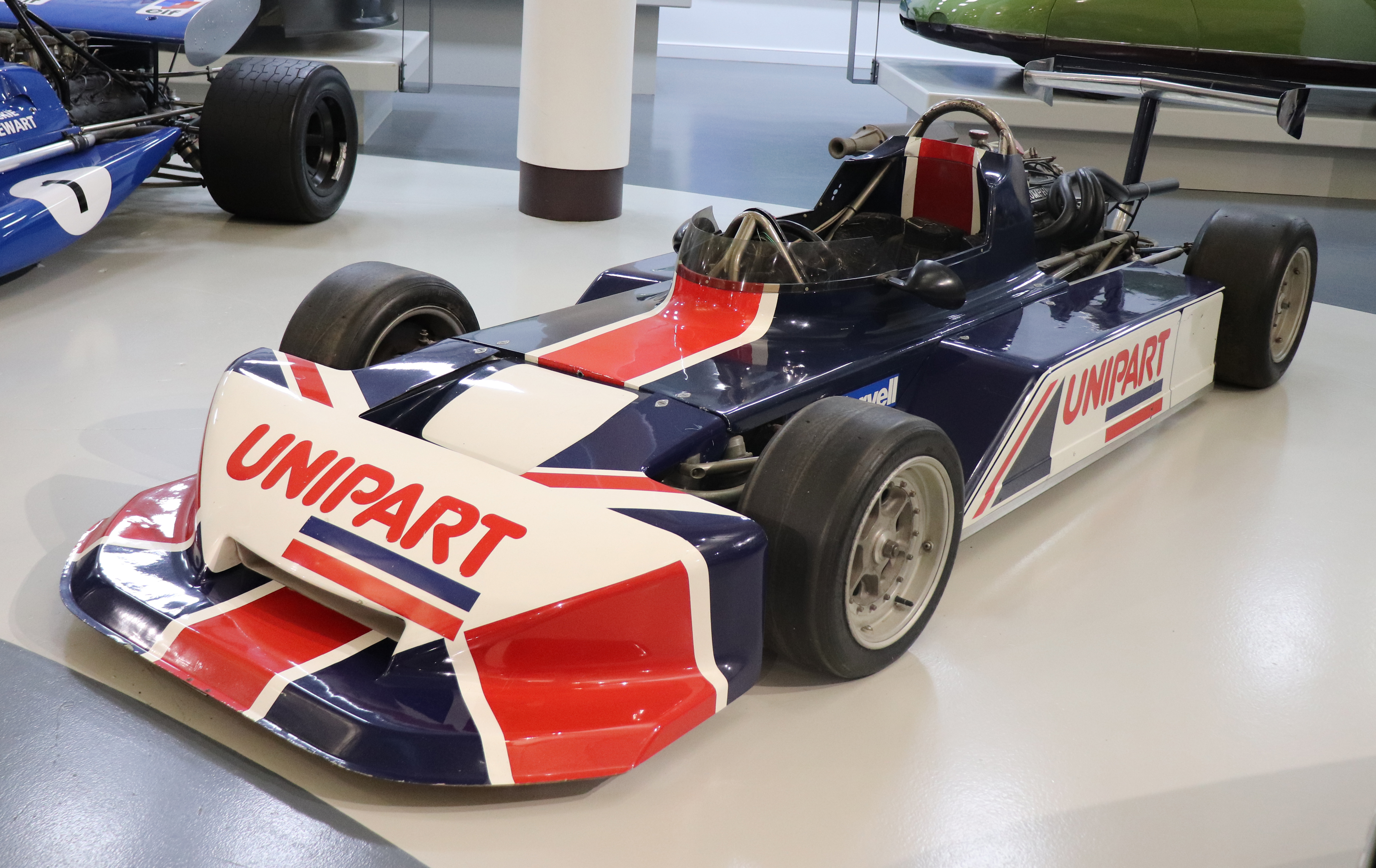
1978 March-Triumph 783

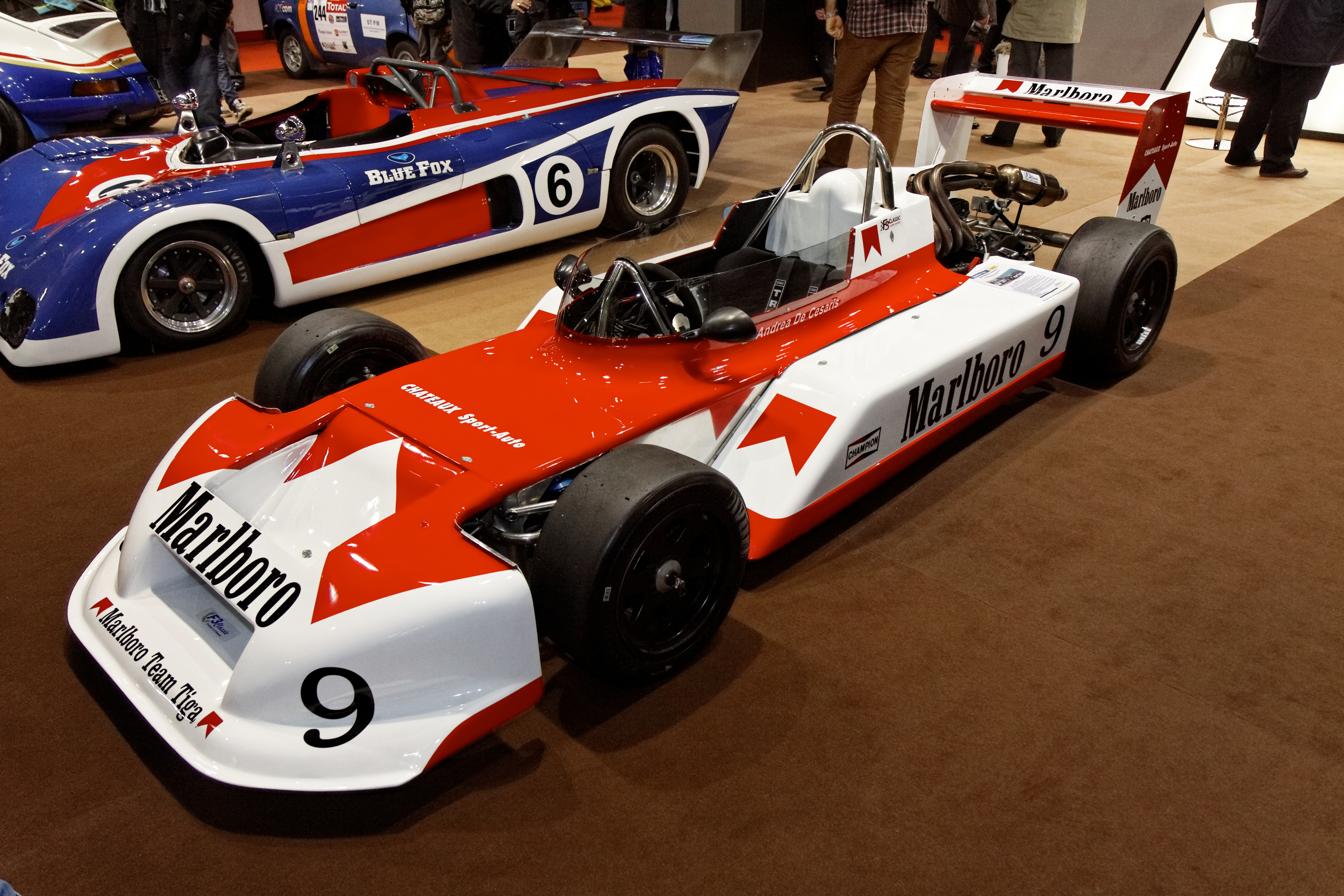
1979 March 793

The March 783 and March 793 are open-wheel Formula 3 race car chassis, designed, developed, and built by March Engineering between 1978 and 1979. They are very similar in design, with the 793 essentially being a ground effect version of the 783; with lower side pods and skirts. Between them, they won a total of 24 races, including three non-championship races in 1979, with Kenny Acheson. The 793 chassis in particular was extremely successful, and completely dominated the 1979 season, with Brazilian Chico Serra clinching the 1979 British Formula Three Championship, after winning 5 out of the 20 races. Italian Andrea de Cesaris was runner-up, placing second in the championship; having also won 5 races with the March 793. New Zealander Mike Thackwell placed third in the championship, having won 4 races with the March 793 chassis. They were powered by either a Toyota or Triumph four-cylinder engine.
