= March 847 =

- Category: Can-Am
- Constructor: March Engineering
- Successor: None

Technical specifications
- Engine: Chevrolet 5,000 cc (305.1 cu in) V8 engine naturally-aspirated mid-engined
- Tyres: Goodyear

Competition history
- Notable entrants: Newman/Budweiser Racing
- Notable drivers: Jim Crawford
- Debut: 1984 Can-Am Mosport Park
Races	Wins
10	3

The March 847 was a British sports prototype racing car, built by March Engineering in 1984 for the Can-Am series. As with all other full-size Can-Am cars of the time, it used a mid-mounted 5-litre, naturally-aspirated Chevrolet V8 engine. It was driven by Jim Crawford for RK Racing/United Breweries, scoring 3 wins. Jim Crawford and the March 847 chassis would both successfully finish the championship as runner-up at the end of the season.
