= March 86B =

Open-wheel race car designed and built by March Engineering

- Category: Formula 3000
- Constructor: March

Technical specifications
- Chassis: Aluminum monocoque with rear sub-frame covered in fiberglass body
- Suspension (front): Double wishbones, Coil springs over shock absorbers, Anti-roll bar
- Suspension (rear): Twin lower links, Single top links, twin trailing arms, Coil springs over shock absorbers, Anti-roll bar
- Wheelbase: 3,000 mm (118 in)
- Engine: Ford-Cosworth DFV, mid-engined, longitudinally mounted, 3.0 L (183.1 cu in), 90°, V8, DOHC, NA
- Transmission: Hewland 6-speed manual
- Power: 470 hp (350 kW)
- Weight: 545 kg (1,202 lb)

Competition history
- Debut: 1986

The March 86B was an open-wheel formula race car, designed, developed and built by British manufacturer March Engineering, for Formula 3000 racing categories, in 1986.
