= March 717 =

British sports prototype race car

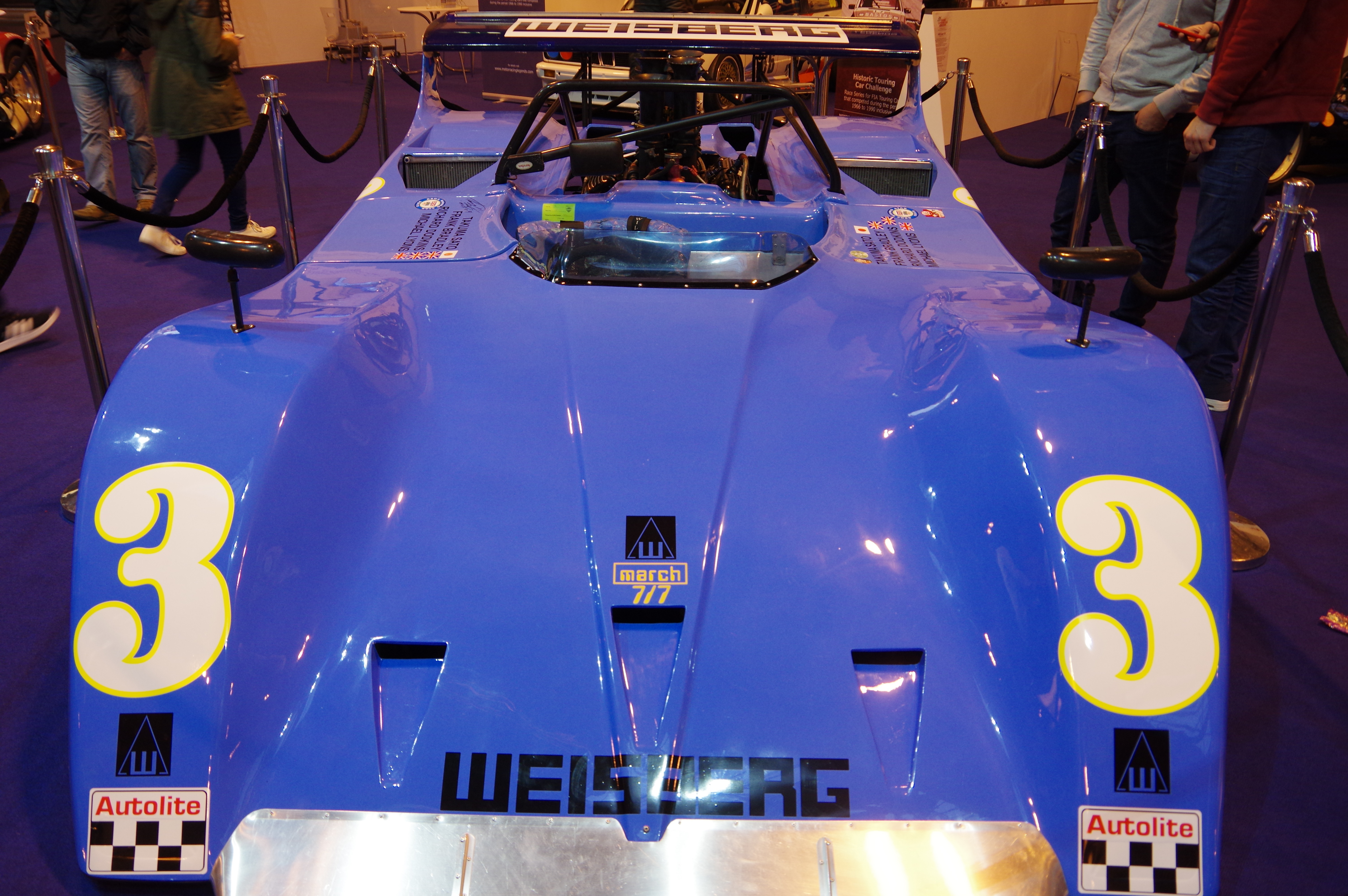
- Front of the March 717
- Category: Can-Am
- Designer: Robin Herd
- Production: 1970 - 1971
- Predecessor: March 707

Technical specifications
- Wheelbase: 2,460 mm (96.9 in)
- Engine: Chevrolet big-block V8 engine
- Transmission: Hewland LG600 5-speed manual

Competition history
- Notable drivers: (New Zealand) Chris Amon
Wins	Podiums	Poles
0	1	0

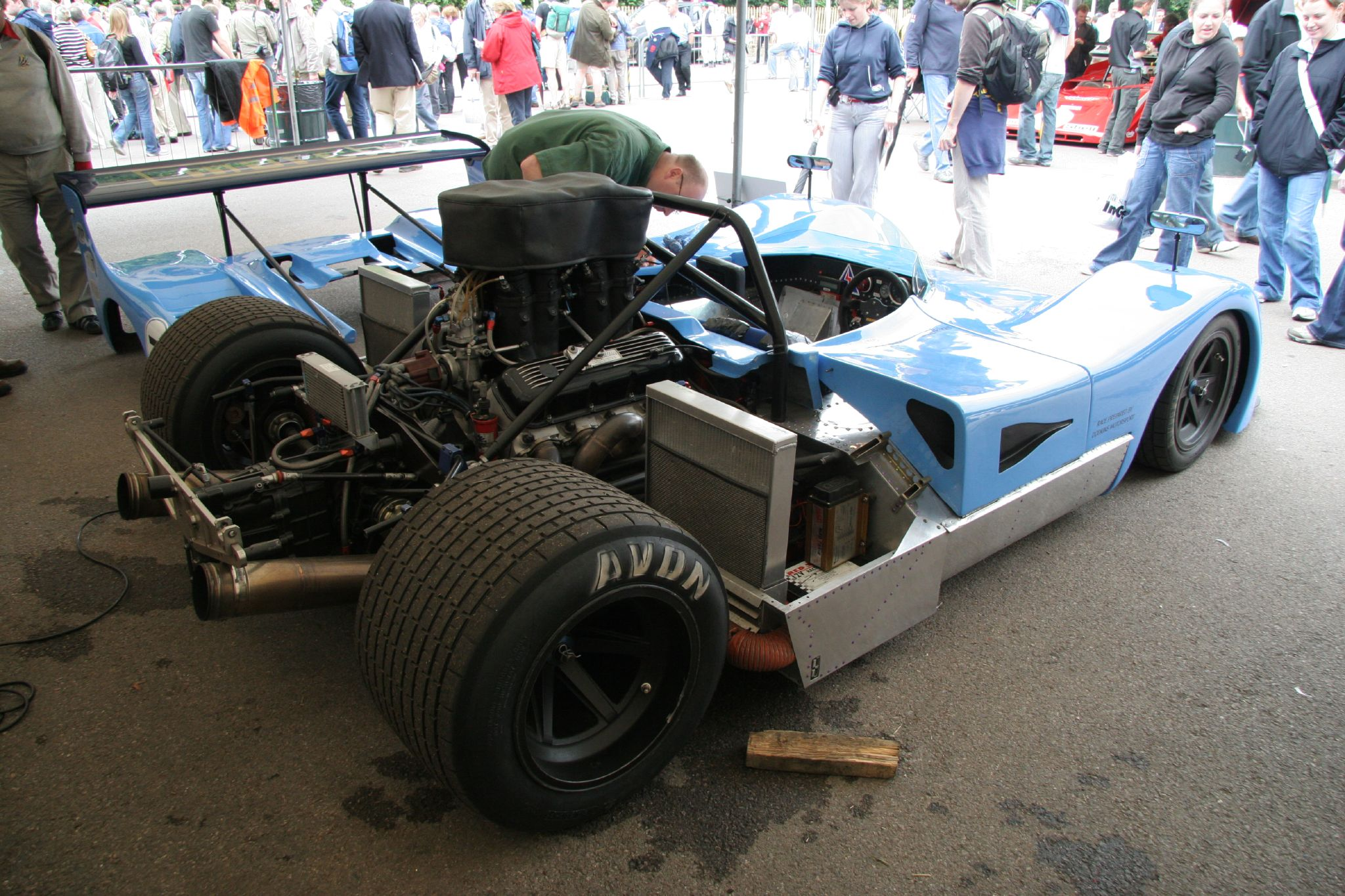
March 717 rear exposed

The March 717 was a British Group 7 sports prototype racing car, built by March Engineering in 1970 for the Can-Am series. As with all other full-size Can-Am cars of the time, it used a large-displacement, mid-mounted, 537 cu in (8.80 L), naturally-aspirated, Chevrolet big-block V8 engine, making 800 hp (600 kW). Like its predecessor, it was driven by New Zealand racing driver, Chris Amon.
