= Graham Coaker =

British engineer and businessman (1932–1971)

- Graham Coaker, with his wife Carol, pictured at an early test of the March 693 car in 1969.
- Born: 1932
- Died: 12 April 1971 (aged 38-39)

Graham Victor Coaker (1933 – 19 May 1971) was a British engineer and businessman, who was one of the four founders of the March Engineering motor racing manufacturer.

== Biography ==
Coaker was trained as an accountant and mechanical engineer, and had been a keen amateur Formula Three competitor during the mid- to late-1960s. During this time he became friendly with fellow racers Max Mosley and Alan Rees, and racing car designer Robin Herd. The four created March Engineering in mid-1969, the name of the team being derived from their initials: Max Mosley, Alan Rees, Graham Coaker, and Robin Herd. Coaker was responsible for the workshop and manufacturing side of the new company, drawing on many years of experience as general manager of one of Hawker Siddeley's automotive subsidiaries, and was the driving force behind March's move into the customer-car market. The company's first manufacturing premises were actually in Coaker's own garage and it was here that the first March racing car, the March 693P, was constructed.

Coaker left March in early 1971, and received a March 712M Formula Two car as part of his settlement package. He died that May from sepsis caused by injuries sustained when he crashed the car during practice for a Formule Libre race at Silverstone Circuit.
