= March 707 =

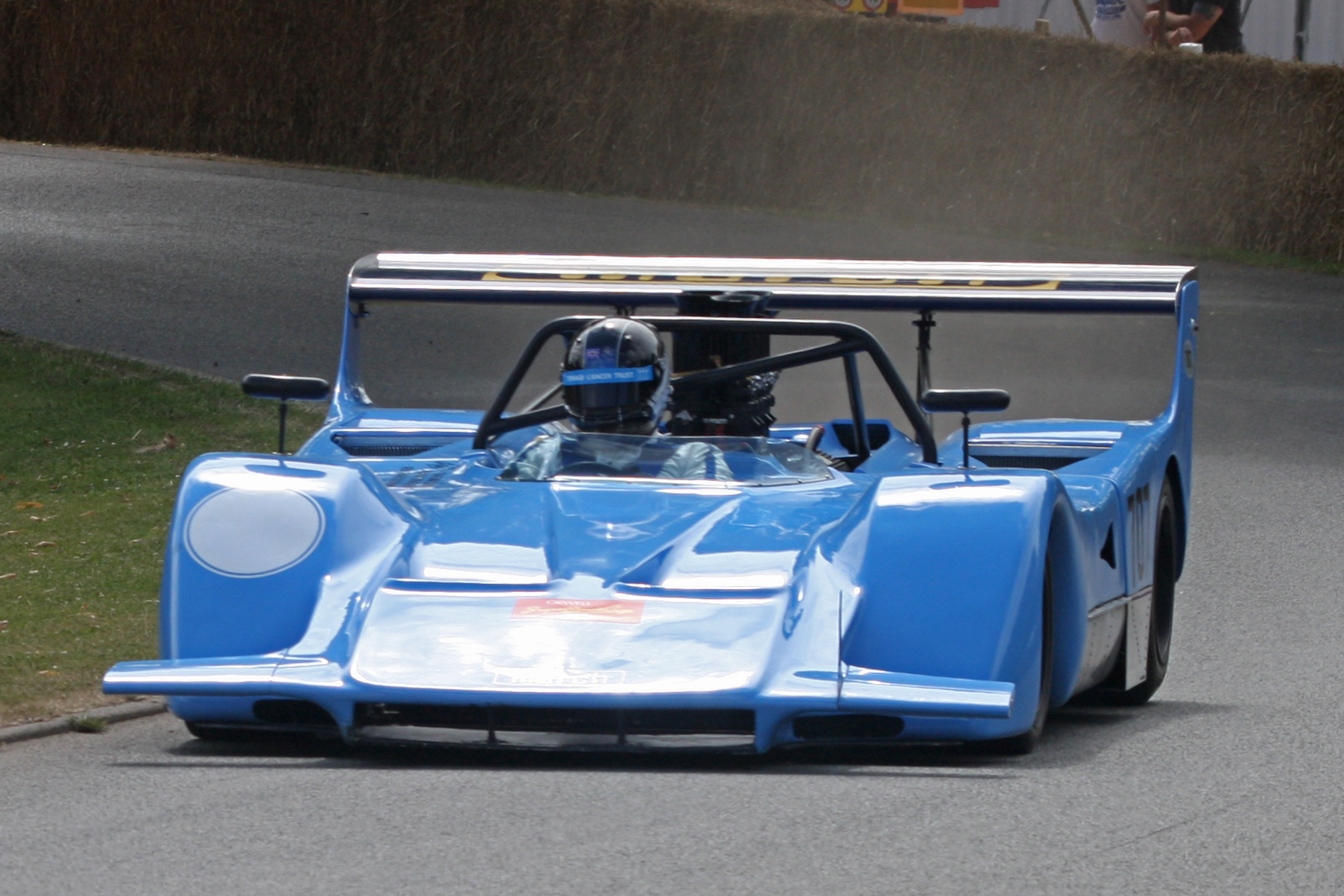
- Designer(s): Robin Herd
- Successor: March 717

Technical specifications
- Suspension: Double Wishbone
- Wheelbase: 2,460 mm (96.9 in)
- Engine: Chevrolet Big Block 457–502 cu in (7,489–8,226 cc) V8 Naturally aspirated RMR layout
- Transmission: Hewland LG600 5-speed Manual
- Power: 680–800 hp (507–597 kW); 650–740 lb⋅ft (881–1,003 N⋅m)
- Weight: 700–850 kg (1,543–1,874 lb)
- Fuel: 265 L (58.3 imp gal; 70.0 US gal)

Competition history
- Notable drivers: (New Zealand) Chris Amon (Germany) Helmut Kelleners; Gordon Dewar
Wins	Podiums	Poles
5	6	4

The March 707 was a British Group 7 sports prototype racing car, built by March Engineering in 1970 for the Can-Am series. As with all other full-size Can-Am cars of the time, it used a large-displacement, mid-mounted, 457–502 cu in (7.49–8.23 L), naturally-aspirated, Chevrolet big-block V8 engine, generating between 680–800 hp (510–600 kW). It was driven by New Zealand racing driver, Chris Amon.
