= March 723 =

The March 723 was a Formula 3 racing car built by March Engineering in 1972.

== Development ==
The March 723 was the successor to the March 713, the 1971 season Formula 3 racing car which was the basic design for all March Formula 3 cars through 1978. The 723 was used in the British Formula 3 Championship by the factory team and many private drivers. The 723 was far from the fastest car of the year and many drivers switched to competing products from GRD and Ensign mid-season. The Formula Atlantic version, which dominated this racing series in Great Britain and the USA, was successful.

In 1973, the far more successful March 733 replaced the 723.
