= March 827 =

- Category: Can-Am
- Constructor: March Engineering
- Successor: March 832

Technical specifications
- Engine: Chevrolet 5,000 cc (305.1 cu in) V8 engine naturally-aspirated mid-engined
- Tyres: Goodyear

Competition history
- Notable entrants: Newman/Budweiser Racing
- Notable drivers: Danny Sullivan
- Debut: 1982 Can-Am Mosport Park
Races	Wins	Podiums	Poles
9	1	7	3

The March 827 was a British sports prototype racing car, built by March Engineering in 1982 for the revived Can-Am series. As with all other full-size Can-Am cars of the time, it used a mid-mounted 5-litre, naturally-aspirated Chevrolet V8 engine. It was driven by Danny Sullivan for Newman/Budweiser racing. It won only 1 race in 1982, at Caesars Palace.
