= Formula 3000 =

Former category of open-wheel single-seater racing

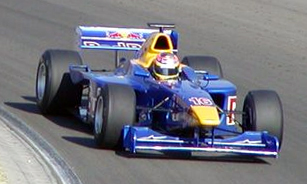
Formula 3000 car in 2003

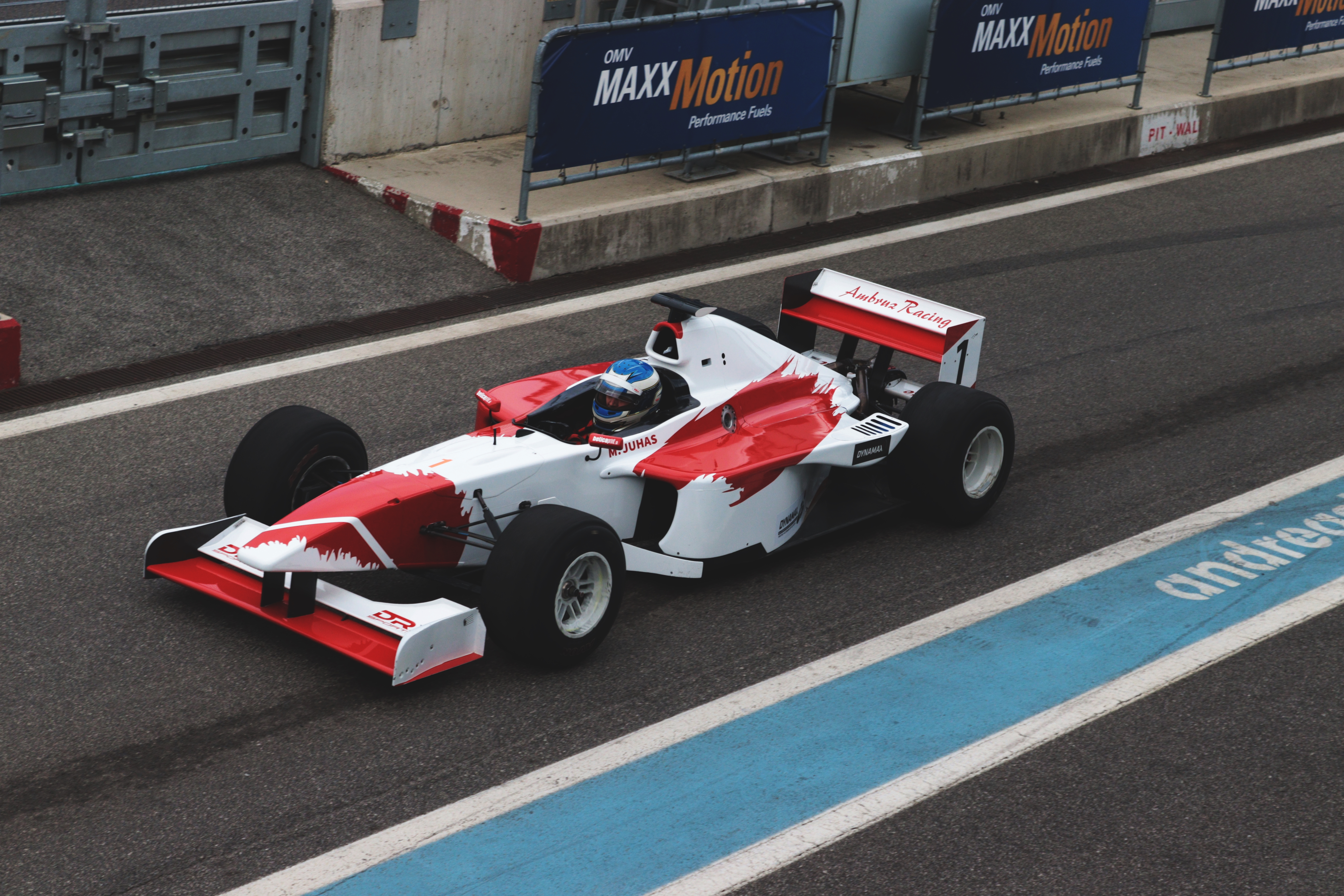
Formula 3000 car in 2022, Slovak hillclimb championship

Formula 3000 (F3000) was a type of open wheel, single seater formula racing, occupying the tier immediately below Formula One and above Formula Three. It was so named because the cars were powered by 3.0 L engines.

== Formula 3000 championships ==
=== FIA International Formula 3000 Championship ===
The most prestigious F3000 series, International Formula 3000, was introduced by the Fédération Internationale de l'Automobile (FIA) in 1985 to replace Formula Two, and was itself replaced by the GP2 Series in 2005. While the International series is usually synonymous with F3000, other series racing to F3000 specification have existed.

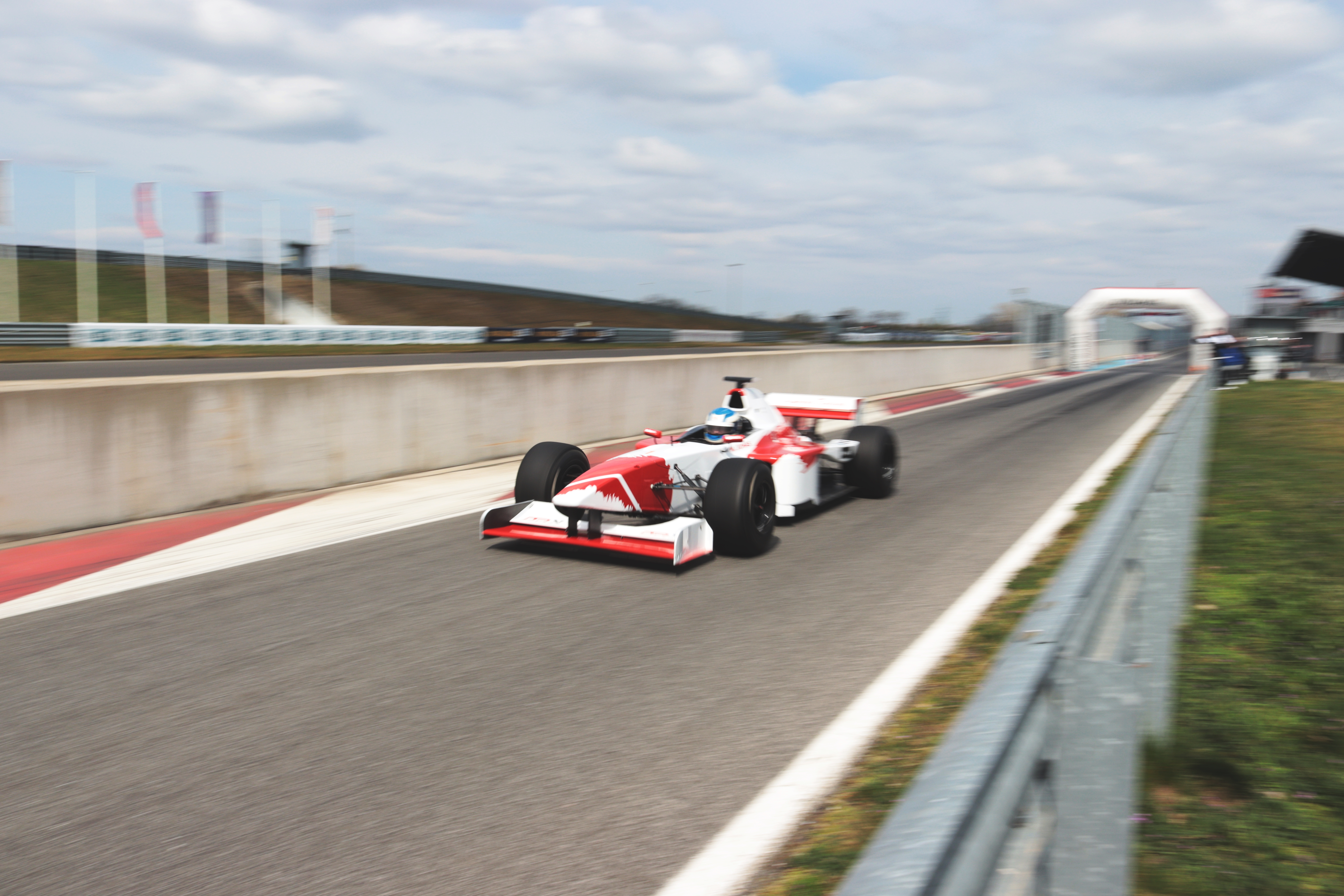
Formula 3000 car moments after start.

=== British Formula 3000/F2 Championship ===
A small British Formula 3000 series ran for several years in the late 1980s and early 1990s, usually using year-old cars. Founded in 1989 as the British Formula 3000 Championship, the series was renamed the British Formula Two Championship in 1992, but grids diminished quickly and it was ended after the 1994 season. It was restarted in 1996 and cancelled once more the following year, after one race had been held with only three cars. Two other attempts at restarting F3000 racing in the UK failed.

=== Euro Formula 3000/Euroseries 3000 ===
An Italian series evolved into a second-level one, Euro Formula 3000 (now Euroseries 3000), running the previous generation of spec Lolas. An Italian national series started in 2005 with the arrival of the GP2 Series, but has now been merged with Euroseries 3000, running both B02/50 and B99/50 cars. As of 2010, it is renamed Auto GP, using old A1 Grand Prix cars and engines in place of F3000 regulations.

=== American Racing Series ===
The American Racing Series, a predecessor of Indy Lights, ran with March F3000 chassis (called Wildcats) and Buick V6 engines, before turning to Lolas some years later.

=== Japanese F3000/Formula Nippon ===
Japan persisted with Formula Two rules for a couple of years after the demise of F2 in Europe, but then adopted basically F3000 rules in 1987. Unlike European F3000, the Japanese Championship featured much competition between tyre companies, and tended to feature highly paid drivers (both local and European) in cars tending to be more developed and tested than those in the European series. The Mugen engine dominated this series, and was also competitive in European F3000. Japanese F3000 was renamed Formula Nippon in 1996, and completely split off from European racing in 2009 with the new Swift chassis.

=== Formula Holden/Formula 4000 ===
In Australia Formula 4000 continued to use old F3000 chassis (predominantly Reynard) until 2006, as had its predecessors Formula Brabham and Formula Holden.
