= 1982 Michigan 500 =

Coordinates: 42°03′58.68″N 84°14′29.18″W

(United States) 1982 Michigan 500
Race details
- Race 5 of 11 in the 1982 CART season
- Date: July 18, 1982
- Official name: 1982 Norton Michigan 500
- Location: Michigan International Speedway, Brooklyn, Michigan, United States
- Course: Permanent racing facility 2.000 mi / 3.219 km
- Distance: 250 laps 500.000 mi / 804.672 km
- Weather: Cloudy with temperatures up to 82 °F (28 °C); wind speeds reaching up to 10 miles per hour (16 km/h)

Pole position
- Driver: (United States) Mario Andretti (Patrick Racing)
- Time: 205.233 mph (330.290 km/h)

Podium
- First: (United States) Gordon Johncock (Patrick Racing)
- Second: (United States) Mario Andretti (Patrick Racing)
- Third: (United States) Bobby Rahal (Truesports)

The 1982 Michigan 500, the second running of the event, was held at the Michigan International Speedway in Brooklyn, Michigan, on Sunday, July 18, 1982. Branded as the 1982 Norton Michigan 500 for sponsorship reasons, the event was race number 5 of 11 in the 1982 CART PPG Indy Car World Series. The race was won by Gordon Johncock, two months after his victory in the 1982 Indianapolis 500, giving him wins in the first two legs of Indy car's Triple Crown.

== Background ==
In the 1981 Michigan 500, A. J. Foyt suffered serious arm injuries when he crashed into the guardrail in turn two. In response, Michigan International Speedway replaced its metal guardrails with concrete walls around the race track, with the exception of the backstretch which retained its guardrail.

== Practice and Time Trials ==
Mario Andretti led the opening day of practice on Wednesday, July 14. Andretti's speed of 206.3 mph was followed by Rick Mears at 205.7 mph and Al Unser at 204.5 mph.

Mario Andretti won the pole on Thursday with a speed of 205.233 mph. Joining Andretti on the front row was Rick Mears at 203.816 mph and Gordon Johncock at 202.572 mph. The fourth-fastest qualifier, Don Whittington, was the only other car to qualify at over 200 mph with a speed of 202.350 mph.

Friday's practice session was marked by numerous on track incidents. George Snider spun but hit nothing. Josele Garza and Ken Hamilton crashed, with Garza needing to use a backup car. Scott Brayton spun and lightly hit the wall. Johnny Rutherford suffered damage to his car when his left front wheel fell off and he was able to avoid the wall.

George Snider recovered from his practice spin to post the fastest speed in Friday's qualifying session. At 196.942 mph, Snider earned the 22nd starting spot.

During the final day of practice on Saturday, Andretti crashed his pole-winning car in turn two. The car spun around and impacted the concrete wall with the left side. Andretti was unhurt, but the car could not be repaired in time for the race the following day. Andretti quickly got in the team's backup car and continued practicing, reaching speeds of 199 mph. Because he was no longer racing the car he qualified with, Andretti had to start from the last position.

Roger Penske exercised the "promoter's option" and added Ken Hamilton to the field as the 34th starter.

== Race ==
From his starting spot in the middle of row one, Gordon Johncock took the lead from Rick Mears entering turn one. The first caution came out on lap eight when Herm Johnson, Josele Garza, and Tony Bettenhausen spun in turn four. Only Johnson was unable to continue.

Rick Mears passed Johncock to take the lead on lap 20. The caution came out again on lap 23 when Tom Sneva suffered an engine failure.

Mario Andretti had climbed from his 33rd starting position to the seventh spot by lap 30 and was running third by lap 37. Mario's progress was slowed when he lost a lap in the pits after stalling the engine.

On lap 54, the caution came out when Mike Mosley's car lost a side pod and it landed on the backstretch. Tom Bigelow spun on lap 97 but recovered to finish fifth.

With 143 laps complete, Josele Garza brought out a caution when he spun in turn four. Garza was able to continue but retired shortly thereafter with engine failure.

On the restart following the Garza spin, Hector Rebaque, running 80 laps behind the leaders, spun in avoidance of the Spike Gehlhausen car that had mechanical problems. He spun across the track directly in front of A. J. Foyt. The cars collided with great force, with Foyt then being thrown into the outside wall. Foyt was carried to a stretcher and brought the infield hospital. He was treated for a puncture wound in his left leg and released. "I feel pretty good," Foyt said, "but I think I got the same hole in my leg I had last year."

The race evolved into a battle between Patrick Racing teammates Gordon Johncock and Mario Andretti. Running third on lap 182, Rick Mears hit debris and cut a tire in turn two. The car drifted up the track and hit the wall, sustaining relatively minor damage but ending his race. Mears had led 80 laps. Johncock took the lead for the final time on lap 194.

During a caution for debris on lap 218, Andretti entered the pits hoping to make a front wing adjustment. Carrying too much speed, he overshot his pit stall and had to return to the track without the adjustment. Andretti was unable to catch his faster teammate and Johncock won by over 24 seconds. Bobby Rahal finished third, five laps behind the Patrick cars.

Johncock led 117 laps and won $89,371 in prize money. The victory allowed Johncock to pass Mears for the Indycar points lead. It also gave Johncock the ability to become only the second man in Indy car racing to sweep the Triple Crown of 500 mile races if he could win Pocono a month later, something he did not do.

Similar to the inaugural race in 1981, attrition was high and only 12 of the 34 starters were running at the finish. 11 cautions slowed the field to an average speed of 153.925 mph.

== Box score ==
Finish	Grid	No	Name	Entrant	Chassis	Engine	Laps	Time/Status	Led	Points
1	2	20	(United States) Gordon Johncock	Patrick Racing	Wildcat Mk8B	Cosworth	250	3:14:54.000	117	63
2	3	40	(United States) Mario Andretti	Patrick Racing	Wildcat Mk8B	Cosworth	250	+24.720	35	51
3	9	19	(United States) Bobby Rahal	Truesports	March 82C	Cosworth	245	+5 Laps	0	42
4	12	10	(United States) Al Unser	Longhorn Racing	Longhorn LR03	Cosworth	245	+5 Laps	0	36
5	19	72	(United States) Tom Bigelow	HBK Racing	Eagle 81	Chevrolet	241	+9 Laps	0	30
6	21	56	(United States) Gary Bettenhausen	Gohr Racing	Penske PC-7	Chevrolet	241	+9 Laps	0	24
7	13	21	(Australia) Geoff Brabham	Bignotti-Cotter Racing	March 82C	Cosworth	241	+9 Laps	0	18
8	10	18	(United States) Mike Mosley	Kraco Racing	March 82C	Cosworth	239	+11 Laps	0	15
9	20	42	(United States) Jim Hickman	Rattlesnake Racing	March 82C	Cosworth	236	+14 Laps	0	12
10	24	6	(United States) Tony Bettenhausen Jr.	Bettenhausen Motorsports	March 82C	Cosworth	234	+16 Laps	0	9
11	31	37	(United States) Scott Brayton	Brayton Racing	Penske PC-7	Cosworth	225	Stalled	0	6
12	18	30	(United States) Howdy Holmes	Doug Shierson Racing	March 82C	Cosworth	218	+32 Laps	0	3
13	28	2	(United States) Bill Alsup	Alsup Racing	Penske PC-9C	Cosworth	213	+37 Laps	0	3
14	7	4	(United States) Kevin Cogan	Penske Racing	Penske PC-10	Cosworth	191	Water leak	0	3
15	1	1	(United States) Rick Mears	Penske Racing	Penske PC-10	Cosworth	184	Crash	80	3
16	23	34	(United States) Johnny Parsons	Wysard Motor Co.	March 82C	Cosworth	184	Engine	0	3
17	16	31	(United States) Roger Mears	Machinists Union Racing	Penske PC-7	Cosworth	165	Engine	0	3
18	6	3	(United States) Pancho Carter	Alex Morales Motorsports	March 82C	Cosworth	159	Wheel bearing	9	3
19	22	35	(United States) George Snider	Fletcher Racing Team	March 82C	Cosworth	148	Gearbox	0	3
20	8	14	(United States) A. J. Foyt	A. J. Foyt Enterprises	March 82C	Cosworth	147	Crash	6	3
21	30	22	(United States) Dick Simon	Leader Card Racers	Watson	Cosworth	138	Piston	0	0
22	25	55	(Mexico) Josele Garza	Garza Racing	March 81C	Cosworth	130	Engine	0	0
23	15	49	(United States) Spike Gehlhausen	Spike Gehlhausen	Eagle 81	Cosworth	127	Shift lever	0	0
24	26	46	(United States) Jerry Karl	McCray Racing	Penske PC-7	Cosworth	103	Gearbox	0	0
25	29	32	(Mexico) Héctor Rebaque	Forsythe Racing	March 82C	Cosworth	67	Crash	0	0
26	4	91	(United States) Don Whittington	Whittington Racing	March 82C	Cosworth	63	Engine	3	0
27	34	17	(United States) Ken Hamilton	Hamilton Racing	Vollstedt	Offenhauser	55	Oil pressure	0	0
28	11	5	(United States) Johnny Rutherford	Chaparral Racing	March 82C	Cosworth	54	Piston	0	0
29	27	36	(United States) Patrick Bedard	Brayton Racing	Wildcat Mk8	Cosworth	49	Engine	0	0
30	33	65	(United States) Phil Krueger	Luxury Racers	King	Chevrolet	48	Fueling	0	0
31	17	12	(United States) Chip Ganassi	Rhoades Racing	Wildcat Mk8	Cosworth	37	Engine	0	0
32	5	7	(United States) Tom Sneva	Bignotti-Cotter Racing	March 82C	Cosworth	23	Engine	0	0
33	32	77	(United States) Tom Frantz	Tom Frantz	Coyote 80	Chevrolet	20	Vibration	0	0
34	14	28	(United States) Herm Johnson	Team Menard	Eagle 82	Chevrolet	7	Crash	0	0

=== Race Statistics ===
- Average Speed: 153.925 mph (247.718 km/h)
- Lead changes: 28 among 6 drivers

Lap Leaders
From Lap	To Lap	Total Laps	Leader
1	19	19	Gordon Johncock
20	22	3	Rick Mears
23	25	3	Don Whittington
26	28	3	Rick Mears
29	31	3	Gordon Johncock
32	41	10	Rick Mears
42	45	4	A.J. Foyt
46	50	5	Pancho Carter
51	57	7	Rick Mears
58	60	3	Gordon Johncock
61	78	18	Rick Mears
79	83	5	Gordon Johncock
84	87	4	Pancho Carter
88	98	11	Rick Mears
99	101	3	Gordon Johncock
102	113	12	Rick Mears
114	138	25	Mario Andretti
139	141	3	Rick Mears
142	143	2	A.J. Foyt
144	156	13	Rick Mears
157	160	4	Mario Andretti
161	175	15	Gordon Johncock
176	176	1	Mario Andretti
177	179	3	Gordon Johncock
180	183	4	Mario Andretti
184	192	9	Gordon Johncock
193	193	1	Mario Andretti
194	250	57	Gordon Johncock

== Standings after the race ==
Drivers' Championship standings

Pos	Driver	Points
1	(United States) Gordon Johncock	157
2	(United States) Mario Andretti	123
3	(United States) Rick Mears	119
4	(United States) Bobby Rahal	104
5	(United States) Al Unser	89

== Broadcasting ==
For the second straight year, the Michigan 500 was broadcast live by NBC. Paul Page and Charlie Jones did the play-by-play coverage in the broadcast booth. Gary Gerould and Bruce Jenner served as pit reporters.
