= 1982 CART PPG Indy Car World Series =

American motorsport season

1982 CART season
- PPG Indy Car World Series

Season
- Races: 11
- Start date: March 28
- End date: November 6

Awards
- Drivers' champion: (United States) Rick Mears
- Constructors' Cup: (United Kingdom) March
- Manufacturers' Cup: (United Kingdom) Cosworth
- Nations' Cup: United States
- Rookie of the Year: (United States) Bobby Rahal

The 1982 CART PPG Indy Car World Series season, the fourth in the CART era of U.S. open-wheel racing, consisted of 11 races, beginning in Avondale, Arizona on March 28 and concluding at the same location on November 6. The PPG Indy Car World Series Drivers' Champion was Rick Mears. Rookie of the Year was Bobby Rahal.

Though it was not officially part of the CART calendar, most of the teams and drivers also competed at the USAC-sanctioned 66th Indianapolis 500. Gordon Johncock was victorious at Indy.

Jim Hickman was fatally injured in a practice crash for the Tony Bettenhausen 200 at Milwaukee, he was 39 years old.

== Drivers and constructors ==
The following teams and drivers competed in the 1982 CART World Series.

Team/Car Owner	No	Drivers	Rounds
Alex Morales Motorsports	3	(United States) Pancho Carter	All
Alsup Racing	2	(United States) Bill Alsup	All
Alsup Racing	27	(United States) Spike Gehlhausen	7
Arciero Racing	66	(United States) Pete Halsmer	8-9, 11
Armstrong Mould Racing Team	43	(United States) Greg Leffler	2
Bettenhausen Racing	8	(United States) Gary Bettenhausen	6, 11
Bettenhausen Racing w/ H&R Racing	6	(United States) Tony Bettenhausen Jr.	1-3, 5-11
Bignotti-Cotter Racing	7	(United States) Tom Sneva	All
Bignotti-Cotter Racing	21	(Australia) Geoff Brabham	All
Brayton Racing	36	(United States) Patrick Bedard	1-2, 5
Brayton Racing	36	(United States) Scott Brayton	3, 7, 10
Brayton Racing	37	(United States) Scott Brayton	1, 5
BVC Racing	75	(Australia) Dennis Firestone	1
Caliva Racing	38	(United States) Phil Caliva	8, 11
Chaparral Racing	5	(United States) Johnny Rutherford	1-9, 11
Circle Bar Auto Racing	39	(United States) Chet Fillip	11
Doug Shierson Racing	30	(United States) Howdy Holmes	All
Fletcher Racing	35	(United States) Gordon Smiley	2
Fletcher Racing	35	(United States) George Snider	5, 7
Forsythe Racing	32	(Mexico) Héctor Rebaque	2-5, 8-9
Forsythe Racing	33	(United States) Danny Sullivan	2-3
Forsythe Racing	33	(United States) Al Unser Jr.	8
Frantz Racing w/ Burger King	77	(United States) Tom Frantz	1, 5, 8
Garza Racing	55	(Mexico) Josele Garza	All
Gilmore Racing	14	(United States) A. J. Foyt	3-5, 7, 10
Gohr Racing	56	(United States) Joe Saldana	3-4
Gohr Racing	56	(United States) Gary Bettenhausen	5, 7-10
Grant King Racers	65	(United States) Todd Tuttle	4
GTS Racing	86	(United States) Al Loquasto	1, 7
Hamilton Racing	17	(United States) Ken Hamilton	5
HBK Racing	72	(United States) Tom Bigelow	3-7, 10
HBK Racing	72	(United States) Bill Whittington	9
Hodgson-Curb	29	(United States) Bobby Olivero	1
Hoffman Racing	69	(United States) Jerry Sneva	10
Hoffman Racing w/ Rattlesnake Racing	42	(United States) Jim Hickman	2-6
Jamieson Racing	49	(United States) Chip Mead	1, 3
Jamieson Racing	49	(United States) Spike Gehlhausen	3, 5
Jet Engineering	64	(United States) Steve Chassey	1
Jet Engineering	64	(United States) Bob Frey	3
Jet Engineering	64	(United States) Greg Leffler	6, 8-11
Joe Hunt Magneto	89	(United States) Phil Krueger	1-2
Joe Hunt Magneto	89	(United States) Dick Ferguson	8
Joe Hunt Magneto	89	(United States) Jerry Sneva	11
Joel McCray Racing	46	(United States) Leroy van Conett	1
Joel McCray Racing	46	(United States) Jerry Karl	4-8
Kraco Enterprises	18	(United States) Dick Ferguson	1-2
Kraco Enterprises	18	(United States) Bill Vukovich II	3
Kraco Enterprises	18	(United States) Mike Mosley	5-7, 10-11
Kraco Enterprises	99	(Australia) Vern Schuppan	4, 8-9
Leader Card Racers	22	(United States) Dick Simon	1-8, 10-11
Leader Card Racers	24	(United States) Bill Vukovich II	7
Longhorn Racing	10	(United States) Al Unser	1-10
Luxury Racers	65	(United States) Bob Brutto	1
Luxury Racers	65	(United States) Phil Krueger	5, 7, 9-11
Machinists Union Racing	31	(United States) Roger Mears	All
McElreath Racing	23	(United States) Jim McElreath	1, 7-8
Menard Racing	28	(United States) Herm Johnson	1-6, 8-9
Metametrix	47	(United States) Chris Kneifel	8-9
Metametrix	47	(Canada) Jacques Villeneuve Sr.	11
Newman Freeman Racing	68	(United States) Mike Chandler	8, 11
Patrick Racing	20	(United States) Gordon Johncock	All
Patrick Racing	40	(United States) Mario Andretti	All
Rattlesnake Racing	11	(United States) Dick Ferguson	10-11
Ray W Lipper Racing	73	(United States) Ray Lipper	1
Rhoades Racing	12	(United States) Chip Ganassi	1-2, 4-5, 7, 10
Team Penske	1	(United States) Rick Mears	All
Team Penske	4	(United States) Kevin Cogan	All
Tempero Racing	15	(United States) Bill Tempero	1, 4, 6, 8-9, 11
Truesports	19	(United States) Bobby Rahal	1, 3-11
Whittington Racing	91	(United States) Don Whittington	5
Wysard Racing	34	(United States) Hurley Haywood	1-2
Wysard Racing	34	(United States) Johnny Parsons	3-5, 7-8, 10
Wysard Racing	34	(United States) John Paul Jr.	9
Wysard Racing	34	(Republic of Ireland) Derek Daly	11

== Schedule ==
New to the schedule was the temporary circuit at Burke Lakefront Airport, and the permanent road course named Road America. Returning to the schedule after a one year absence (1981 was a USAC race) was Pocono Raceway, the 2.5 mile superspeedway would host a 500-mile race in 1982.

The schedule was originally set to feature a doubleheader with Formula One at Las Vegas on October 17. After the F1 Grand Prix on Saturday, the track would be converted to an oval for an Indy car race on Sunday. This was cancelled after FISA rescheduled the Grand Prix for September and instituted a rule that banned two open-wheel series with engines over two liters from competing at the same venue on the same weekend.

A race in Mexico City on October 31 was also cancelled.

Icon	Legend
O	Oval/Speedway
R	Road course
S	Street circuit
NC	Non-championship race

Rd	Date	Name	Circuit	Location
1	March 28	(United States) Kraco Car Stereo 150	O Phoenix International Raceway	Avondale, Arizona
2	May 1*	(United States) Stroh's 200	O Atlanta Motor Speedway	Hampton, Georgia
NC	May 30	(United States) Indianapolis 500	O Indianapolis Motor Speedway	Indianapolis, Indiana
3	June 13	(United States) Gould Rex Mays Classic	O Milwaukee Mile	West Allis, Wisconsin
4	July 4	(United States) Budweiser Cleveland 500	S Burke Lakefront Airport	Cleveland, Ohio
5	July 18	(United States) Norton Michigan 500	O Michigan International Speedway	Brooklyn, Michigan
6	August 1	(United States) Tony Bettenhausen 200	O Milwaukee Mile	West Allis, Wisconsin
7	August 15	(United States) Domino's Pizza Pocono 500	O Pocono International Raceway	Long Pond, Pennsylvania
8	August 29	(United States) AirCal 500K	R Riverside International Raceway	Riverside, California
9	September 19	(United States) Road America 200	R Road America	Elkhart Lake, Wisconsin
10	September 26	(United States) Detroit News Grand Prix	O Michigan International Speedway	Brooklyn, Michigan
11	November 6	(United States) Miller High Life 150	O Phoenix International Raceway	Avondale, Arizona

* The Stroh's 200 was scheduled for April 25, but postponed a week due to rain. NBC planned to cover on April 25, but did not return for the May 1 running.

== Results ==
Rd	Race	Pole position	Winning driver	Winning team	Race time	Report
1	Phoenix 1	(United States) Rick Mears	(United States) Rick Mears	(United States) Team Penske	1:15:48	Report
2	Atlanta	(United States) Rick Mears	(United States) Rick Mears	(United States) Team Penske	1:13:10	Report
NC	Indianapolis 500	(United States) Rick Mears	(United States) Gordon Johncock	(United States) Patrick Racing	3:05:09	Report
3	Milwaukee 1	(United States) Gordon Johncock	(United States) Gordon Johncock	(United States) Patrick Racing	1:10:52	Report
4	Cleveland	(United States) Kevin Cogan	(United States) Bobby Rahal	(United States) Truesports	3:03:44	Report
5	Michigan 1	(United States) Rick Mears / Mario Andretti	(United States) Gordon Johncock	(United States) Patrick Racing	3:14:54	Report
6	Milwaukee 2	(United States) Rick Mears	(United States) Tom Sneva	(United States) Bignotti-Cotter Racing	1:49:57	Report
7	Pocono	(United States) Rick Mears	(United States) Rick Mears	(United States) Team Penske	3:25:39	Report
8	Riverside	(United States) Kevin Cogan	(United States) Rick Mears	(United States) Team Penske	2:42:14	Report
9	Road America	(United States) Rick Mears	(Mexico) Héctor Rebaque	(United States) Forsythe Racing	1:49:56	Report
10	Michigan 2	(United States) Rick Mears	(United States) Bobby Rahal	(United States) Truesports	1:04:03	Report
11	Phoenix 2	(United States) Rick Mears	(United States) Tom Sneva	(United States) Bignotti-Cotter Racing	1:21:05	Report

Mario Andretti was credited with winning the pole position for the Michigan 500, although he started 33rd due to a pre-race practice accident. Rick Mears started on the pole and both he and Andretti were credited with pole positions.

=== Final points standings ===
Pos	Driver	PHX1 (United States)	ATL (United States)	INDY (United States)	MIL (United States)	CLE (United States)	MIS1 (United States)	MIL (United States)	POC (United States)	RIV (United States)	ROA (United States)	MIS2 (United States)	PHX2 (United States)	Pts
1	(United States) Rick Mears	**1***	**1***	**2***	3	4	**15***	**12***	**1***	1*	**5**	**25**	**2**	294
2	(United States) Bobby Rahal RY	18		11	20	1	3	2	3	15	3*	1*	5	242
3	(United States) Mario Andretti	2	11	31	9	2	**2**	3	14	23	14	2	3	188
4	(United States) Gordon Johncock	5	2	1	**1***	5	1	11	6	26	22	15	23	186
5	(United States) Tom Sneva	7	17	4	4	20	32	1	19	2	9	19	1*	144
6	(United States) Kevin Cogan	3	18	30	5	**10***	14	5	2	**10**	25	22	4	136
7	(United States) Al Unser	21	8	5	17	3	4	DNS	23	17	2	18		125
8	(Australia) Geoff Brabham	15	15	28	7	6	7	10	4	28	15	3	20	110
9	(United States) Roger Mears	8	4	32	22	21	17	14	9	4	8	8	7	103
10	(United States) Tony Bettenhausen Jr.	12	19	26	12		10	20	5	18	7	4	6	80
11	(United States) Bill Alsup	11	5	DNQ	16	12	13	9	13	8	16	6	8	70
12	(United States) Johnny Rutherford	4	DNS	8	15	23	28	17	12	3	12	DNS	21	62
13	(United States) Howdy Holmes	16	DNS	10	10	16	12	4	27	16	10	5	10	56
14	(Mexico) Josele Garza	13	16	29	8	14	22	8	15	13	4	9	18	56
15	(Mexico) Héctor Rebaque R		13	13	Wth	18	25			20	1			48
16	(United States) Gary Bettenhausen			12			6	13	8	DNQ	20	17	9	48
17	(United States) Pancho Carter	6	10	3	13	19	18	6	28	19	11	12	11	47
18	(United States) Johnny Parsons			20	6	9	16		7	25		26		41
19	(United States) Mike Mosley			DNQ			8	7	16			7	12	37
20	(United States) Tom Bigelow			18	18	DNQ	5	22	25			20		32
21	(United States) Al Unser Jr. R									5				30
22	(United States) Danny Sullivan R		3	14	21									28
23	(United States) Phil Krueger	DNQ	12	DNQ			30	DNQ	11		6	11	17	27
24	(United States) Greg Leffler		DNQ	DNQ			DNQ	21		6	13	24	13	27
25	(United States) Dick Simon	DNQ	Wth	DNQ	19	17	21	15	22	7	Wth	13	19	26
26	(United States) Herm Johnson	19	6	9	23	13	34	16		22	17			24
27	(United States) Jim Hickman R		7	7	Wth	24	9	DNQ						24
28	(United States) A. J. Foyt			19	2	22	20		20			23		22
29	(United States) Bill Tempero	DNQ				8		19		14	18		DNQ	22
30	(Australia) Vern Schuppan			DNQ		7				27	24			18
31	(United States) Jerry Karl			DNQ		15	24	18	10	12				17
32	(United States) Mike Chandler			17						9			16	13
33	(United States) Scott Brayton	14		Wth	14		11		24			10		11
34	(United States) Chip Ganassi R	22	DNS	15		11	31		17			16		10
35	(United States) Gordon Smiley		9	DNQ										8
36	(United States) Chris Kneifel R									11	23			6
37	(United States) Chip Mead	9		DNQ	Wth									4
38	(United States) Hurley Haywood	10	DNQ											3
39	(United States) Jim McElreath	Wth		DNQ					18	DNQ				3
40	(United States) George Snider			21			19		21					3
41	(United States) Bill Vukovich II			DNQ	11				29					2
42	(United States) Patrick Bedard	DNQ	14	DNQ			29							2
43	(United States) Pete Halsmer R			25						24	19		24	2
44	(United States) Jerry Sneva			23								14	DNQ	1
45	(Canada) Jacques Villeneuve Sr. R												14	1
46	(United States) Chet Fillip R			23					Wth				15	1
47	(United States) Dick Ferguson	17	DNS							21		21	22	1
48	(Australia) Dennis Firestone	20		27										1
49	(United States) John Paul Jr. R										21			0
50	(United States) Spike Gehlhausen			DNQ	DNQ		23		30					0
51	(Republic of Ireland) Derek Daly R												25	0
52	(United States) Al Loquasto	DNQ							26					0
53	(United States) Don Whittington			6			26							0
54	(United States) Ken Hamilton R			Wth			27							0
55	(United States) Tom Frantz	DNQ		Wth			33			DNQ				0
–	(United States) Bill Whittington			33							DNS			-
–	(United States) Rich Vogler				DNQ								Wth	-
–	(United States) Bob Frey			DNQ	DNQ	DNQ								-
–	(United States) Joe Saldana			DNQ	DNQ	DNQ								-
–	(United States) Phil Caliva			Wth						DNQ			DNQ	-
–	(United States) Rick DeLorto							DNQ			DNQ			-
–	(United States) Richard Hubbard										DNQ		Wth	-
–	(United States) Steve Chassey	DNQ		DNQ										-
–	(United States) Bob Brutto	DNQ												-
–	(United States) Ray Lipper	DNQ												-
–	(United States) Bobby Olivero	DNQ												-
–	(United States) Tod Tuttle					DNQ								-
–	(United States) Danny Ongais		Wth	22										-
–	(United States) Leroy van Conett	Wth		Wth										-
–	(South Africa) Desiré Wilson			DNQ										-
–	(United States) Steve Krisiloff			DNQ										-
–	(United States) Roger Rager			DNQ										-
–	(United States) John Martin			DNQ										-
–	(United States) Salt Walther			DNQ										-
–	(United States) Billy Scott			DNQ										-
–	(United States) John Mahler			DNQ										-
–	(United States) Bob Lazier			Wth										-
–	(United States) Billy Engelhart			Wth										-
–	(United States) Rusty Schmidt			Wth										-
–	(Belgium) Teddy Pilette			Wth										-
–	(United States) Dean Vetrock			Wth										-
–	(United States) Bob Harkey			Wth										-
–	(United States) Gary Irvin			Wth										-
–	(United States) Jan Sneva			Wth										-
Pos	Driver	PHX1 (United States)	ATL (United States)	INDY (United States)	MIL (United States)	CLE (United States)	MIS1 (United States)	MIL (United States)	POC (United States)	RIV (United States)	ROA (United States)	MIS2 (United States)	PHX2 (United States)	Pts

Color	Result
Gold	Winner
Silver	2nd place
Bronze	3rd place
Green	4th & 5th place
Light Blue	6th-10th place
Dark Blue	Finished (Outside Top 10)
Purple	Did not finish
Red	Did not qualify (DNQ)
Brown	Withdrawn (Wth)
Black	Disqualified (DSQ)
White	Did not start (DNS)
Blank	Did not participate (DNP)
Blank	Not competing

**In-line notation**
**Bold**	Pole position
Italics	Ran fastest race lap
*	Led most race laps
RY	Rookie of the Year
R	Rookie

== See also ==
- 1981–82 USAC Championship Car season
- 1982 Indianapolis 500
- 1982–83 USAC Championship Car season
