= 1982 Pocono 500 =

(United States) 1982 Pocono 500
Race details
- 7th round of the 1982 CART PPG Indy Car World Series season
- Date: August 15, 1982
- Official name: 1982 Domino's Pizza Pocono 500
- Location: Long Pond, Pennsylvania
- Course: Permanent racing facility 2.5 mi / 4.023 km
- Distance: 200 laps 500 mi / 804.672 km
- Weather: Temperatures up to 80 °F (27 °C); wind speeds up to 10 miles per hour (16 km/h)

Pole position
- Driver: (United States) Rick Mears (Team Penske)
- Time: 200.948 mph

Podium
- First: (United States) Rick Mears (Team Penske)
- Second: (United States) Kevin Cogan (Team Penske)
- Third: (United States) Bobby Rahal (Truesports)

The 1982 Pocono 500, the 12th running of the event, was held at the Pocono Raceway in Long Pond, Pennsylvania, on Sunday, August 15, 1982. Branded as the 1982 Domino's Pizza Pocono 500 for sponsorship reasons, the race was won by Rick Mears, his first Pocono 500 win.

== Background ==
In 1979, Indy car racing split into the two separate sanctioning bodies of USAC and CART. The Pocono 500 remained a USAC race and was boycotted by CART teams. Because of a lack of entries from major teams, attendance for the Pocono 500 plummeted and the track lost millions of dollars. After the 1981 Pocono 500, Pocono filed a lawsuit against CART saying their boycott violated antitrust laws and was guilty of "conspiracy to monopolize" Indy car racing. They sought $9 million in damages. In addition to CART, defendants included Team Penske, Roger Penske, Patrick Racing, Pat Patrick, and Gould Inc. They alleged that the defendants "knew about the financial difficulties suffered by the track and they hoped that they could acquire the property at a 'distress' price."

In December 1981, Pocono added a second NASCAR Winston Cup race to their schedule and dropped the Indy Car Pocono 500. However, it was acknowledged that if the lawsuits against CART could be settled, a date in August 1982 was a possibility for Pocono on the CART schedule.

On May 1, 1982, an announcement was made that the Pocono 500 would be a late addition to the 1982 CART season, scheduled for August 15, previously an off-weekend for CART. As part of the agreement, all litigation between Pocono and CART was dropped and CART agreed to lease and promote the Pocono 500 for a period of five years.

On June 28, Domino's Pizza CEO Tom Monaghan announced the pizza chain would sponsor the Pocono 500.

It was also announced that a ten-lap, consolation race for cars that failed to qualify would take place on Saturday, one day before the 500 mile event. However, as only 30 cars entered the race, short of the 33 starting positions, this race was canceled.

Gordon Johncock won the Indianapolis 500 and the Michigan 500, giving him the first two legs in Indy Car's Triple Crown. He entered the Pocono 500 with an opportunity to become the first driver to win all three 500 mile race since Al Unser in 1978.

== Practice and time trials ==
=== Practice - Tuesday, August 10 ===
In the Tuesday, August 10, practice session, Rick Mears had the fastest speed at 197.027 mph. Mario Andretti was second fastest at 191.730 mph.

Chet Fillip crashed in turn one and suffered a broken heel and severe bruises to both legs and ankles, he would not return to racing until the season finale at Phoenix. Spike Gehlhausen lost a wheel in turn two and crashed into the wall. Gehlhausen's car was damaged beyond repair and he borrowed Bill Alsup's backup car.

=== Practice - Wednesday, August 11 ===
Qualifying was rained out on Wednesday afternoon and rescheduled for Friday, giving teams an extra practice day on Thursday. In a brief practice session on Wednesday afternoon, Rick Mears ran the fastest speed at 197.338 mph.

=== Practice - Thursday, August 12 ===
In a three-hour Thursday practice, Kevin Cogan set the pace at 195.644 mph. Mario Andretti was second fastest at 195.448 mph. Mears tested a backup car at 194.632 mph.

=== Qualifying - Friday, August 13 ===
Qualifying was held on Friday, August 13. For the first time, the lineup was set by the single best time of two laps, not an average speed of the two laps. Rick Mears won the pole with a speed of 200.983 mph. Mears' lap broke the single lap record that Peter Revson set in 1973 of 191.367 mph. It was the fifth time in 1982 that Mears broke a track record. Mears' Team Penske teammate, Kevin Cogan, was second fastest at 196.541 mph. Johnny Rutherford was third at 194.843 mph.

Gordon Johncock spun and hit the wall on his second qualifying lap. He had just posted the fifth fastest qualifying speed when his car spun in turn one and backed into the wall.

Entering the race, news spread through the garage that Rick Mears was using an experimental turbocharger manufactured by Borg-Warner in Japan and was partially the reason for his four mph advantage over the second fastest car. It was the only turbo of its kind, with a second not being made until September. Mears admitted the turbocharger was untested and "definitely a risk" to run it in the race as an unproven part.

== Race ==
For the first time, the Pocono 500 started with the cars aligned in rows of two instead of three-wide. Rick Mears led the field to green and led the first five laps.

On lap 6, Mario Andretti passed Mears in turn two to take the lead. Johnny Rutherford passed Mears in turn three to drop him to third. Andretti extended his streak of leading laps in his last nine Pocono 500s. On lap 12, Rutherford passed Andretti for the lead entering turn one. A caution for debris came out one lap later. Under yellow, Gordon Johncock's crew was able to fix a problem that kept him from having brakes for the first 15 laps. The race went back to green on lap 17 and Tom Sneva passed Rutherford on the restart.

On lap 27, a caution came out when Howdy Holmes blew an engine and stopped on track. Rutherford pitted, which gave the lead back to Mears.

Seeking the Triple Crown, Gordon Johncock led for the first time on lap 66. He held it for four laps before pit stops cycled the lead back to Mears.

Sneva dropped out of the race on lap 70 with ignition troubles. A. J. Foyt retired with handling problems after completing 70 laps. Mario Andretti fell out of the race with gearbox issues on lap 114.

On lap 138, the third-place car of Johnny Rutherford blew a right-rear tire entering turn one and spun 360 degrees, impacting the wall hard with the right side of the car. The car split in half, with the engine and gearbox torn loose from the chassis. With assistance, Rutherford walked to the ambulance. Rutherford was airlifted by helicopter to a local hospital where his only injury was a broken metacarpal bone leading to the pinky finger on his right hand. He was released from the hospital later that afternoon. In his first nine starts in the Pocono 500, Rutherford had never finished worse than seventh, and had an average finish of 3.8.

Running second with seven laps to go, Johncock fell out of the race with a broken gearbox and brought out the ninth caution flag of the day. That set up a two-lap shootout to the finish with Mears holding off Kevin Cogan by two seconds.

Rick Mears led 142 laps and won $66,435. It was his first Pocono 500 victory and the fourth for Team Penske. The win allowed Mears to overcome a 36-point deficit to Johncock and take the points lead. Mears would not relinquish the lead and won his third CART championship.

== Box score ==
Finish	Grid	No	Name	Entrant	Chassis	Engine	Laps	Time/Status	Led	Points
1	1	1	(United States) Rick Mears	Penske Racing	Penske PC-10	Cosworth	200	3:25:39.000	142	66
2	2	4	(United States) Kevin Cogan	Penske Racing	Penske PC-10	Cosworth	200	+2.000	10	48
3	7	19	(United States) Bobby Rahal	Truesports	March 82C	Cosworth	197	+3 Laps	1	42
4	12	21	(Australia) Geoff Brabham	Bignotti-Cotter Racing	March 82C	Cosworth	197	+3 Laps	0	36
5	18	6	(United States) Tony Bettenhausen Jr.	Bettenhausen Motorsports	March 82C	Cosworth	195	+5 Laps	0	30
6	5	20	(United States) Gordon Johncock	Patrick Racing	Wildcat Mk8B	Cosworth	193	Gearbox	14	24
7	10	34	(United States) Johnny Parsons	Wysard Motor Co.	March 82C	Cosworth	191	+9 Laps	0	18
8	23	56	(United States) Gary Bettenhausen	Gohr Racing	Penske PC-7	Chevrolet	188	+12 Laps	0	15
9	22	31	(United States) Roger Mears	Machinists Union Racing	Penske PC-7	Cosworth	181	+19 Laps	0	12
10	24	46	(United States) Jerry Karl	McCray Racing	Penske PC-7	Cosworth	161	Engine	0	9
11	27	65	(United States) Phil Krueger	Luxury Racers	King	Chevrolet	149	+51 Laps	0	6
12	3	5	(United States) Johnny Rutherford	Chaparral Racing	March 82C	Cosworth	137	Crash	24	3
13	17	2	(United States) Bill Alsup	Alsup Racing	Penske PC-9C	Cosworth	129	Engine	0	3
14	4	40	(United States) Mario Andretti	Patrick Racing	Wildcat Mk8B	Cosworth	114	Gearbox	6	3
15	19	55	(Mexico) Josele Garza	Garza Racing	Penske PC-9	Cosworth	106	Transmission	0	3
16	6	18	(United States) Mike Mosley	Kraco Racing	March 82C	Cosworth	100	Engine	0	3
17	16	12	(United States) Chip Ganassi	Rhoades Racing	Wildcat Mk8	Cosworth	98	Engine	0	3
18	26	23	(United States) Jim McElreath	McElreath Racing	Eagle	Offenhauser	79	Clutch	0	3
19	9	7	(United States) Tom Sneva	Bignotti-Cotter Racing	March 82C	Cosworth	70	Ignition	2	3
20	13	14	(United States) A. J. Foyt	A. J. Foyt Enterprises	March 82C	Cosworth	70	Suspension	0	3
21	29	35	(United States) George Snider	Fletcher Racing Team	March 82C	Cosworth	64	Engine	0	0
22	21	22	(United States) Dick Simon	Leader Card Racers	Watson	Cosworth	59	Engine	0	0
23	8	10	(United States) Al Unser	Longhorn Racing	Longhorn LR03B	Cosworth	45	Electrical	1	0
24	15	36	(United States) Scott Brayton	Brayton Racing	Wildcat Mk8	Cosworth	39	Engine	0	0
25	20	72	(United States) Tom Bigelow	HBK Racing	Eagle 81	Chevrolet	38	Engine	0	0
26	28	86	(United States) Al Loquasto	GTS Racing	Eagle	Offenhauser	37	Fuel pressure	0	0
27	14	30	(United States) Howdy Holmes	Doug Shierson Racing	March 82C	Cosworth	26	Engine	0	0
28	11	3	(United States) Pancho Carter	Alex Morales Motorsports	March 82C	Cosworth	19	Engine	0	0
29	25	24	(United States) Bill Vukovich II	Leader Card Racers	Watson	Cosworth	17	Oil cooler	0	0
30	30	27	(United States) Spike Gehlhausen	Alsup Racing	Penske PC-7	Cosworth	3	Magneto	0	0

=== Race Statistics ===
- Average Speed: 145.879 mph (234.769 km/h)
- Lead changes: 26 among 8 drivers

Lap Leaders
From Lap	To Lap	Total Laps	Leader
1	5	5	Rick Mears
6	11	6	Mario Andretti
12	16	5	Johnny Rutherford
17	18	2	Tom Sneva
19	27	9	Johnny Rutherford
28	29	2	Rick Mears
30	30	1	Al Unser
31	45	15	Rick Mears
46	46	1	Kevin Cogan
47	47	1	Bobby Rahal
48	64	17	Rick Mears
65	65	1	Kevin Cogan
66	69	4	Gordon Johncock
70	73	4	Johnny Rutherford
74	89	16	Rick Mears
90	92	3	Johnny Rutherford
93	97	5	Kevin Cogan
98	111	14	Rick Mears
112	114	3	Johnny Rutherford
115	130	16	Rick Mears
131	132	2	Gordon Johncock
133	146	14	Rick Mears
147	152	6	Gordon Johncock
153	173	21	Rick Mears
174	175	2	Gordon Johncock
176	178	3	Kevin Cogan
179	200	22	Rick Mears

== Standings after the race ==
Drivers' Championship standings

Pos	Driver	Points
1	(United States) Rick Mears	191
2	(United States) Gordon Johncock	185
3	(United States) Bobby Rahal	178
4	(United States) Mario Andretti	154
5	(United States) Kevin Cogan	112

== Broadcasting ==
For the first time, the Pocono 500 was broadcast by NBC's Sportsworld. Paul Page was the lead broadcaster, joined by Bruce Jenner. Gary Gerould reported from the pits. A one-hour delayed broadcast was aired two weeks after the race on August 29, paired with the Arlington Million horse race.
