= Dale Whittington =

American racing driver (1959–2003)

- Born: Dale Lindsey Whittington; September 23, 1959; Farmington, New Mexico, U.S.
- Died: June 14, 2003 (aged 43); Fort Lauderdale, Florida, U.S.
- Relatives: Don Whittington (brother); Bill Whittington (brother)

24 Hours of Le Mans career
- Years: 1980 – 1981
- Teams: Whittington Bros. Racing; Joest Racing
- Best finish: 37th (1980)
- Class wins: 0

Dale Lindsey Whittington (September 23, 1959 – June 14, 2003) was an American racing driver. Born in Farmington, New Mexico, he was the youngest of four sons born to 1950s race car owner Dick Whittington. Dale Whittington had three sons: R.D Whittington, Dale Lindsey Whittington Jr, Blake Whittington. Dale Whittington has one grandson Dale Whittington III. Whittington was not married at the time of his death.

== Indy 500 ==
Despite having little oval experience, Whittington entered the 1982 Indianapolis 500, joining his brothers Bill and Don to become the only trio of siblings to qualify for the same race at Indy. He qualified 23rd, on the eighth row.

On race day, Whittington found himself caught up in the infamous Kevin Cogan crash. During the final pace lap, just before the green flag was to drop on the frontstretch, Kevin Cogan struck A. J. Foyt, and then Mario Andretti. As the field checked up to avoid the carnage, Whittington locked his brakes and spun into Roger Mears, a driver in the sixth row. All four drivers were eliminated from the race. Dale was out of the race having never taken the green flag, and never again managed to qualify at Indy.

=== Later years ===
Whittington was not involved with the 1980s IMSA Camel GT drug smuggling scandal which involved his brothers (Bill and Don) as well as Randy Lanier, John Paul Sr., and John Paul Jr. Both of his brothers received prison time.

Whittington transitioned to endurance racing, competing in the ALMS series, as well as competing at the 24 Hours of Daytona in 1999 and 2000. He competed in Grand-Am in 2001 often racing with his brother, Don.

Whittington was a developer responsible for developing Tampa Bay Golf and Tennis and later worked at World Jet owned by his brother Don at Fort Lauderdale Executive Airport (FXE). He died on June 14, 2003. He was found dead by his oldest son.

== Motorsports career results ==
=== American Open Wheel racing results ===
(key)

==== Complete USAC Mini-Indy Series results ====
Year	Entrant	1	2	3	4	5	6	7	8	Pos	Points
1979		TEX1	IRP	MIL1	POC	TEX2; 6	MIL2; 12	MIN1; 3	MIN2; 21	14th	233

==== Indianapolis 500 ====
Year	Chassis	Engine	Start	Finish	Entrant
1982	March Engineering	Cosworth DFX	23	33	Whittington Bros. Racing

=== Complete 24 Hours of Le Mans results ===
(key)

Year	Team	Co-Drivers	Car	Class	Laps	Pos.	Class Pos.
1980	(United States) Whittington Bros. Racing	(United States) Don Whittington (United States) Hurley Haywood	Porsche 935	IMSA	151	37th	11th
1981	(Germany) Joest Racing	(Germany) Reinhold Joest (Germany) Klaus Niedzwiedz	Porsche 908	S+2.0	60	39th	10th
