= Kremer Racing =

German auto racing team

(Germany) Kremer Racing
- Founded: 1962
- Founder(s): Erwin Kremer; Manfred Kremer
- Former series: Deutsche Rennsport Meisterschaft; Interserie; BPR Global GT Series; Veranstaltergemeinschaft Langstreckenpokal Nürburgring; World Sportscar Championship
- Noted drivers: (Germany) Klaus Ludwig (Germany) Rolf Stommelen (France) Bob Wollek (Germany) Stefan Bellof (United States) Bill Whittington (United States) Don Whittington (Germany) Hans-Joachim Stuck (Germany) Jürgen Lässig (France) Christophe Bouchut (Germany) Marco Werner (Italy) Giovanni Lavaggi (United Kingdom) Nick Tandy
- Website: https://www.kremer-racing.de/

Kremer Racing is a motorsports team based in Cologne, Germany, founded by racing driver Erwin Kremer and his brother Manfred. They have competed internationally with Porsches for nearly all of their existence, and were even one of the factory-backed squads for many years. Besides running Porsches, the team was also known for their tuned Porsche race cars that they both raced and sold to other teams who could not gain the best equipment from the factory.

== History ==
Among Kremer's greatest achievements were: Winning the 1979 24 Hours of Le Mans with their own 935 K3 with Klaus Ludwig and American brothers Don and Bill Whittington. Kremer Racing later won the 24 Hours of Daytona in a K8 Spyder in 1995 with drivers Jürgen Lässig, Christophe Bouchut, Giovanni Lavaggi and Marco Werner.

After surviving a heart attack two years earlier, the company's founder Erwin died in 2006 and the managing director Uwe Sauer is at the helm of the team, even when younger brother Manfred Kremer bought it back in 2008, before selling it to Eberhard Baunach in 2010.

== Tuned Porsches ==
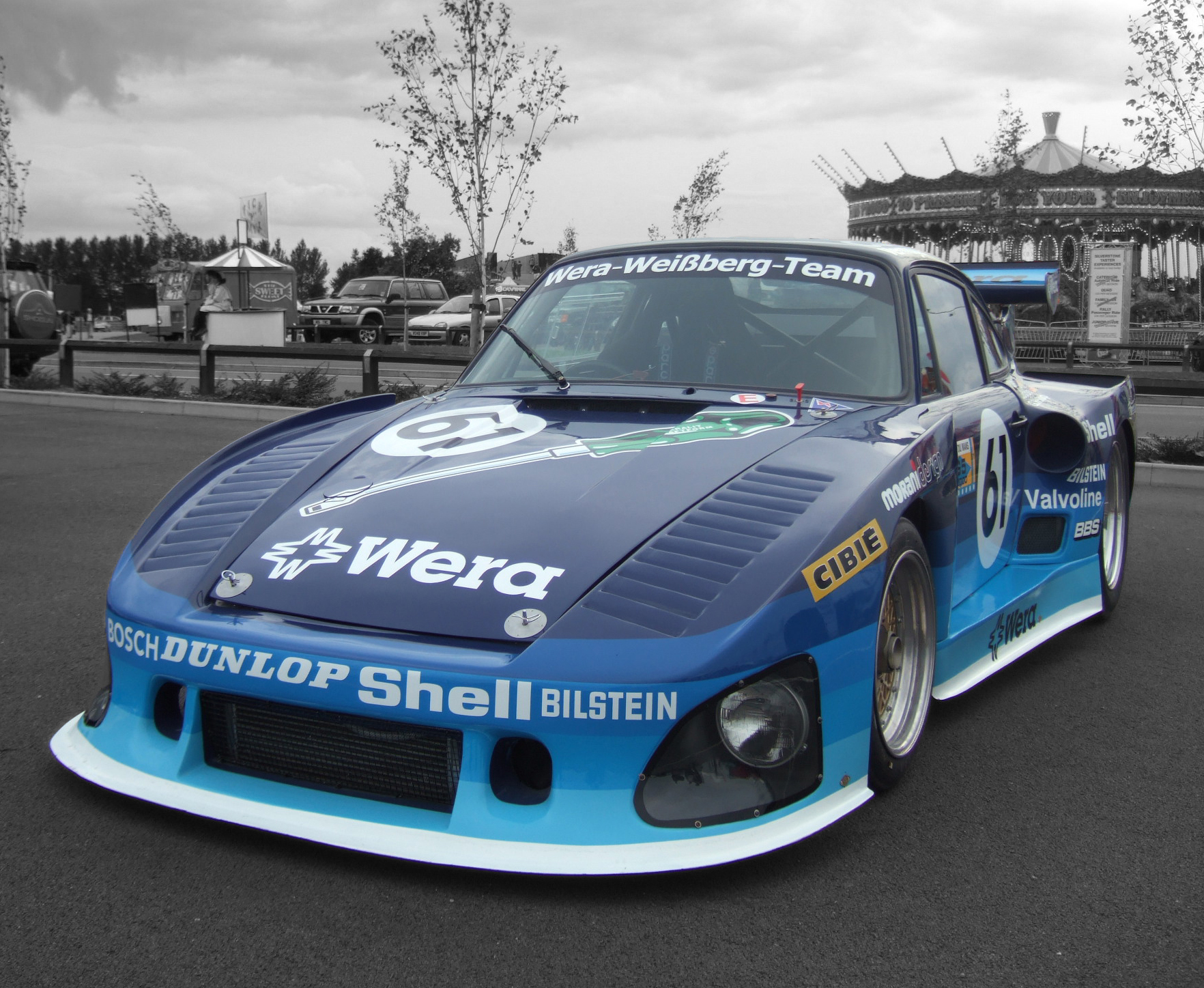
A Kremer 935 K3.

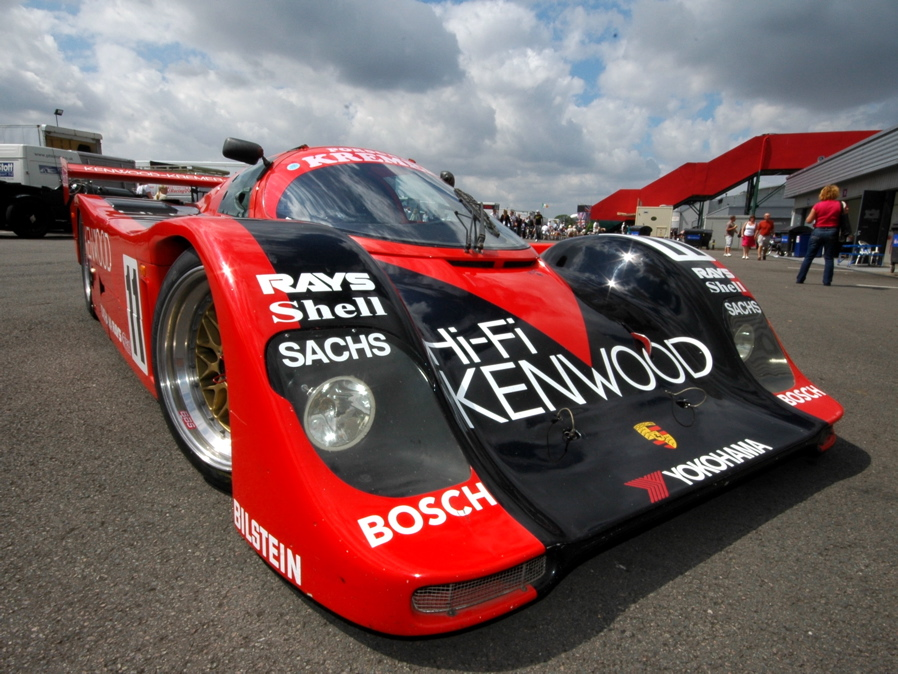
A Kremer 962CK6.

In the 1970s, Kremer initially tuned 911s, 914-6 GTs, and 934s. However, with the Porsche 935, Kremer began designating their tuned models with the letter K, followed by a number in order of construction. Eight cars were designated as such:

- 935 K1 - Their first privately built 935 in 1976
- 935 K2 - An improvement on K1 in 1977.
- 935 K3 - An attempt to mimic the Evolution bodywork on the factory 935/78s. The most successful 935 variant, due to its technical advantage running an air/air intercooler instead of the air/water units used by the Porsche factory. Winner of Le Mans 24 Hours in 1979.
- 935 K4 - An all-new variant of the 935 for the early 1980s, featuring a space frame
- 917K/81 - A 917 for lookalike for the 1981 24 Hours of Le Mans.
- CK5 - A custom-built Group C prototype based on a 936 meant as a temporarily replacement until the 956 was available for customers in 1983.
- 962 CK6 - After two fatal crashes involving the Porsche 956 and 962C at Mosport and Le Mans, Kremer built stiffer chassis to improve on safety. Further models were built.
- CK7 Spyder - An open-cockpit prototype using 962 mechanicals used in Interserie
- K8 Spyder - An improved version of the K7 for use in the International Sports Racing Series and 24 Hours of Le Mans.

Kremer would also make improvements on the 911 GT1-96 and GT2 in the 1990s.

== Bibliography ==
- Michael Cotton, Ulrich Trispel & Robert Weber (18 September 2020). Porsche Kremer Racing – The Complete Team History – Collector's Edition. Sportfahrer Verlag. ISBN 978-3945390016.
