= Bill Whittington =

American racing driver (1949–2021)

- Nationality: (United States) American
- Born: William Marvin Whittington; September 11, 1949 Lubbock, Texas, U.S.
- Died: April 23, 2021 (aged 71) Near Winslow, Arizona, U.S.
- Relatives: Don Whittington (brother); Dale Whittington (brother)

24 Hours of Le Mans career
- Years: 1978 – 1979, 1981 – 1982
- Teams: Whittington Bros. Racing; Porsche Kremer Racing
- Best finish: 1st (1979)
- Class wins: 1 (1979)

William Marvin Whittington (September 11, 1949 – April 23, 2021) was an American racing driver from Lubbock, Texas, who won the 24 Hours of Le Mans and competed five times in the Indianapolis 500.

== Career ==
Whittington, together with his brother Don Whittington and the German professional Klaus Ludwig, multiple winner at Le Mans and elsewhere, competed in the 1979 24 Hours of Le Mans in a Porsche 935. As the brothers did not have substantial racing experience prior to the late 1970s. Bill's brother Dale Whittington also competed in open wheel racing. Together with Randy Lanier they owned the Blue Thunder Racing Team in 1984, with Marty Hinze. Whittington also raced in the Indianapolis 500 five times with a best finish of fourteenth in 1985.

Whittington made two NASCAR Winston Cup starts in 1980, earning an eighth in his debut at Riverside International Raceway (besting brother Don by one spot) and then 32nd in the Daytona 500.

The Whittingtons raced aircraft prior to cars, Bill having won races at Reno between 1978 and 1983. They were the owners of the Road Atlanta circuit.

In 1986, Whittington pleaded guilty to income tax evasion and conspiracy to smuggle marijuana into the United States from Colombia and was sentenced to fifteen years in prison and ordered to surrender $7 million in property and other assets. In 1987, his brother Don Whittington pleaded guilty to money laundering charges in association with his brother's activities. In addition to Bill and Don Whittington, Lanier, John Paul Sr. and John Paul Jr. were part of the IMSA drug smuggling scandal of the 1980s, where a number of drivers financed their racing activities with the proceeds from drug smuggling.

== Death ==
Bill Whittington plane crash
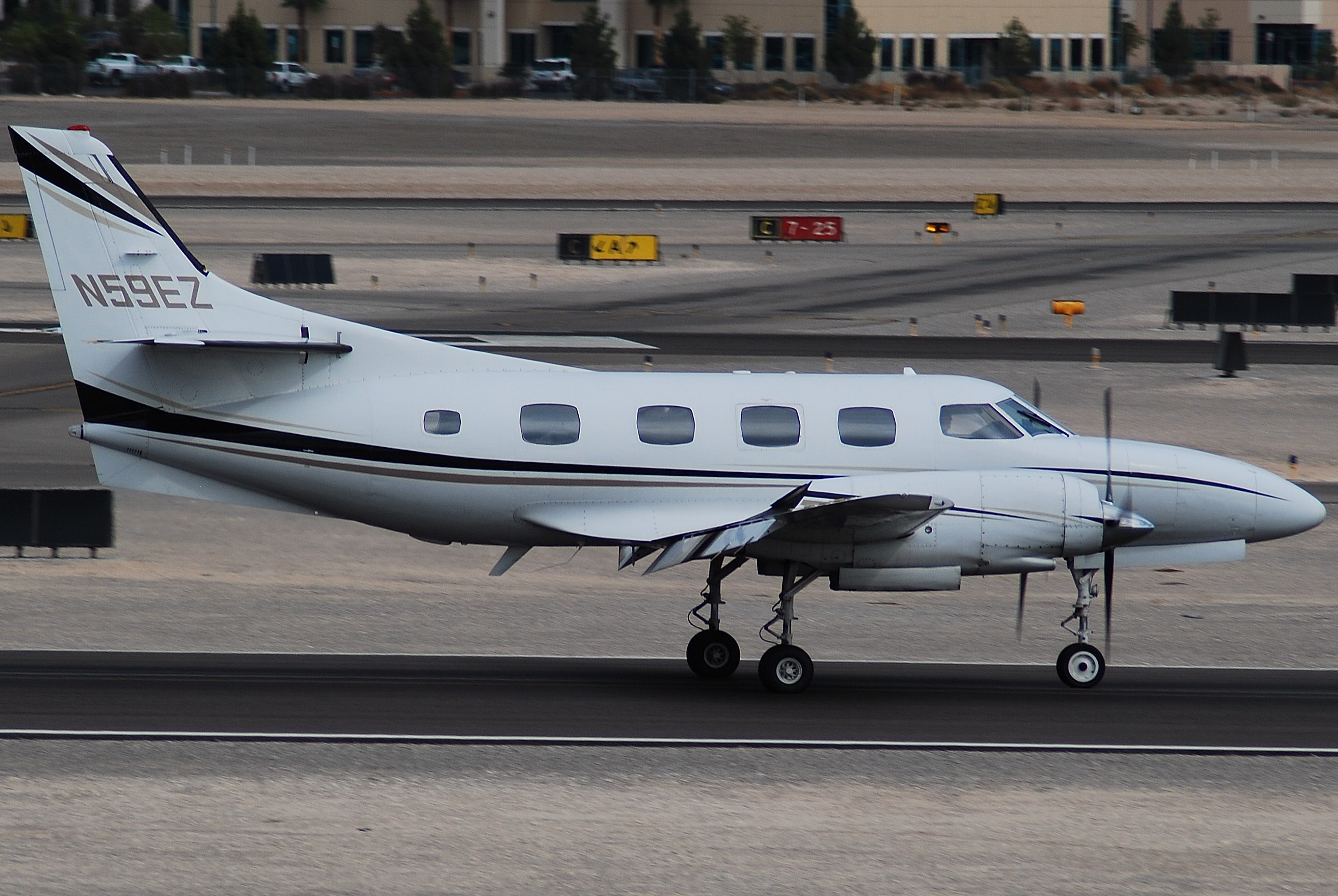
- N59EZ, the Swearingen SA226-T(B) Merlin IIIB involved in the accident, picture taken on October 31, 2008

Accident
- Date: April 23, 2021
- Summary: Engine failure, loss of control
- Site: Navajo County, Arizona, United States

Aircraft
- Aircraft type: Swearingen SA226-T(B) Merlin IIIB
- Operator: Global Air LLC
- Registration: N59EZ
- Flight origin: Scottsdale Airport, Maricopa County, Arizona, United States
- Occupants: 2
- Passengers: 1
- Crew: 1
- Fatalities: 2
- Survivors: 0

At the age of 71, Whittington died in an airplane crash near Winslow, Arizona, on April 23, 2021. According to Randy Lanier and other acquaintances contacted by Autoweek, Whittington owned the aircraft, and was the pilot on the accident flight. Lanier said that Whittington was giving a ride to an unidentified friend who "was terminally ill with cancer and had lost his pilot's license," and that he "wanted to give him an experience of flying again."

The accident aircraft was a Swearingen SA226-T(B) Merlin IIIB, aircraft registration N59EZ; it was destroyed when it impacted terrain under unknown circumstances. The accident was reviewed by the Federal Aviation Administration and the National Transportation Safety Board (NTSB). In their report published in September 2023, the NTSB determined that the primary cause of accident was a loss of right engine power for unknown reasons, while a contributing factor was Whittington's failure to maintain control of the airplane.

== Indianapolis 500 results ==
Year	Chassis	Engine	Start	Finish
1980	Parnelli	Cosworth	27th	30th
1981	March	Cosworth	27th	21st
1982	March	Cosworth	6th	16th
1983	March	Cosworth	15th	18th
1985	March	Cosworth	12th	14th

== 24 Hours of Le Mans results ==
Year	Team	Co-Drivers	Car	Class	Laps	Pos.	Class Pos.
1978	(United States) Whittington Bros. Racing	(Austria) Franz Konrad (United States) Don Whittington	Porsche 935/77	Gr. 5 +2.0	41	DNF	DNF
1979	(Germany) Porsche Kremer Racing	(Germany) Klaus Ludwig (United States) Don Whittington	Porsche 935 K3	Gr. 5 +2.0	307	1st	1st
1981	(Germany) Porsche Kremer Racing	(United States) Ted Field (United States) Don Whittington	Porsche 935 K3	Gr. 5	57	DNF	DNF
1982	(Germany) Porsche Kremer Racing	(United States) Ted Field (United States) Danny Ongais	Porsche-Kremer CK5	C	25	DNF	DNF

Sporting positions
Preceded by Jean-Pierre Jaussaud; Didier Pironi	Winner of the 24 Hours of Le Mans; 1979 with: Klaus Ludwig; Don Whittington	Succeeded by Jean Rondeau; Jean-Pierre Jaussaud
