= Roger Mears =

American off-road racer

- Mears in 2026
- Nationality: (United States) American
- Born: April 24, 1947 (age 79); Wichita, Kansas, U.S.
- Achievements: 20 off-road world championships at Riverside; Two HDRA/SCORE championships Four Baja 1000 class victories Five Pikes Peak International Hill Climb class victories

Champ Car career
- Years active: 1979–1980, 1982–1984
- Team(s): Machinist Union Racing Team; American Dream Racing
- Best finish: 9th (1982)
- First race: 1979 California 500 (Ontario)
- Last race: 1984 Dana Jimmy Bryan 150 (Phoenix)
Wins	Podiums	Poles
0	0	0

NASCAR FedEx Freight Truck Series career
- 4 races run over 1 year
- Best finish: 46th (1995)
- First race: 1995 Skoal Bandit Copper World Classic (Phoenix)
- Last race: 1995 Spears Manufacturing 200 (Mesa Marin)
Wins	Top tens	Poles
0	0	0
- Statistics up to date as of May 18, 2013.

Roger Mears (born April 24, 1947 in Wichita, Kansas) is an American former racing driver. Best known for his career in off-road racing, he also drove in the USAC and CART Champ Car series from 1978 to 1984. He made 31 combined career starts, including at the Indianapolis 500 in 1982 and 1983. He finished in the top-ten 17 times, with a best of fourth place on three occasions.

Following his IndyCar career, Mears returned to off-road racing. Late in his career, he raced in four events during the 1995 NASCAR SuperTruck Series season, racing for Hendrick Motorsports, including the inaugural series race at Phoenix. His best career finish, however, was a 16th at Mesa Marin.

Mears is the father of NASCAR driver Casey Mears, and the older brother of four-time Indianapolis 500 winner Rick Mears. Since his retirement from racing, Mears has been heavily involved in his son's career. He ran an Indy Lights team, with Casey as the driver, before working as a consultant with both Ganassi and Hendrick Motorsports.

Mears is an atheist. He played himself in the 1994 film Desert Steel.

== Racing record ==
=== American open–wheel racing results ===
(key)

=== Complete USAC Mini-Indy Series results ===
Year	Entrant	1	2	3	4	5	6	7	8	9	10	Pos	Points
1978		PIR1	TRE1	MOS	MIL1; 26	TEX	MIL2; 22	OMS1; 15	OMS2	TRE2	PIR2	**51st**	**10**

==== USAC ====
Year	Team	Chassis	Engine	1	2	3	4	5	6	7	8	9	10	11	12	13	14	15	16	17	18	Rank	Points
1978	Beith Racing	Eagle 72	Offenhauser L4t	PHX1	ONT1	TXS1	TRE1	INDY	MOS	MIL1	POC	MIS1	ATL	TXS2	MIL2	ONT2; 6	MIS2	TRE2	SIL	BRH	PHX2; DNS	**25th**	**400**

==== CART ====
Year	Team	Chassis	Engine	1	2	3	4	5	6	7	8	9	10	11	12	13	14	15	16	Rank	Points	Ref
1979	Patrick Racing	Penske PC-6	Cosworth DFX V8t	PHX	ATL1	ATL2	INDY	TRE1	TRE2	MIS1	MIS2	WGL	TRE3	ONT; 13	MIS3	ATL3	PHX2			NC	0	
1980	Hodgdon Racing	McLaren M24	Cosworth DFX V8t	ONT; 9																24th	272	
1980	Grant King Racers	Kingfish 73	Chevrolet V8		INDY; DNQ	MIL	POC	MDO; 4	MIS	WGL; 16	MIL; 26	ONT2	MIS2	MEX	PHX					24th	272	
1982	Machinists Union Racing Team	Penske PC-9B	Cosworth DFX V8t	PHX; 8		MIL; 22	CLE; 21													9th	103	
1982	Machinists Union Racing Team	Penske PC-7	Cosworth DFX V8t		ATL; 4			MIS; 17	MIL2; 14	POC; 9	RIV; 4	ROA; 8	MIS2; 8							9th	103	
1982	Machinists Union Racing Team	Penske PC-10	Cosworth DFX V8t											PHX2; 7						9th	103	
1983	Machinists Union Racing Team	Penske PC-10	Cosworth DFX V8t	ATL; 7	INDY; 28	MIL; 8	CLE; 6	MIS; DNQ	ROA; 8	POC; 16	RIV; 9	MDO; 12	MIS2; 16	CEA; 7	LS; 6	PHX; 16				12th	43	
1984	Caliva Racing	March 84C	Cosworth DFX V8t	LBH; DNQ	PHX; 26															NC	0	
1984	Machinists Union Racing Team	Penske PC-10	Cosworth DFX V8t			INDY; DNQ	MIL	POR	MEA	CLE	MIS	ROA	POC	MDO	SAN	MIS2	PHX2	LS	CEA	NC	0	

==== Indianapolis 500 ====
Year	Chassis	Engine	Start	Finish	Team
1980	Kingfish 73	Chevrolet V8	DNQ		Grant King Racers
1981	Penske PC-7	Cosworth DFX V8t	DNQ		Agajanian
1982	Penske PC-9B	Cosworth DFX V8t	19	32	Machinists Union Racing Team
1983	Penske PC-10	Cosworth DFX V8t	8	28	Machinists Union Racing Team
1984	Penske PC-10	Cosworth DFX V8t	DNQ		Machinists Union Racing Team

=== NASCAR ===
(key) (Bold – Pole position awarded by qualifying time. Italics – Pole position earned by points standings or practice time. * – Most laps led.)

==== SuperTruck Series ====
NASCAR SuperTruck Series results
Year	Team	No.	Make	1	2	3	4	5	6	7	8	9	10	11	12	13	14	15	16	17	18	19	20	NCTC	Pts	Ref
1995	Hendrick Motorsports	25	Chevy	PHO; 21	TUS	SGS	MMR; 16	POR	EVG	I70	LVL	BRI	MLW	CNS	HPT	IRP; 24	FLM	RCH	MAR	NWS	SON			46th	382	
1995	Hendrick Motorsports	5	Chevy																			MMR; 29	PHO	46th	382	
