= Gordon Smiley =

American racing driver (1946–1982)

- Born: Gordon Eugene Smiley; April 20, 1946; Omaha, Nebraska, U.S.
- Died: May 15, 1982 (aged 36); Speedway, Indiana, U.S.

Champ Car career
- 3 (2 starts) races
- Years active: 1980–1982
- Teams: Valvoline, Intermedics
- First race: 1980 Indianapolis 500
- Last race: 1982 Indianapolis 500

Gordon Eugene Smiley (April 20, 1946 – May 15, 1982) was an American race car driver who was killed in a single-car crash at the Indianapolis Motor Speedway. He was inducted into the Nebraska Auto Racing Hall of Fame in 2000.

== SCCA and road racing career ==
Driving his first race at the age of 19, Smiley was an accomplished road racer. He raced SCCA Formula Ford, Formula Atlantic, Formula 1000, Can-Am, Formula 5000 and Formula Super Vee, winning in each series while setting 25 track records, winning the SCCA Midwest Divisional Championship four times. He recorded two pole positions at the SCCA National Championship Runoffs, with a best finish of second in Formula Ford in 1971.

In 1979, Smiley raced in the British Formula One Championship (sometimes called the "Aurora Formula One Championship") for the Surtees Team, and in 11 races he had eight top-ten finishes, including a win at Silverstone in 1979. He also disputed the F1 non-championship 1979 Race of Champions in Brands Hatch, finishing tenth with a Tyrrell.

== Indy career ==
Smiley raced in the Indianapolis 500 twice, in 1980 and 1981, and was killed while trying to qualify for a third in 1982 as part of the Fletcher Racing Team.

In the 1980 Indianapolis 500, Smiley qualified Patrick Racing's Valvoline Phoenix/Cosworth in 20th position. His race ended when the turbocharger blew on lap 47, causing him to finish 25th. In the 1981 Indianapolis 500, Smiley qualified the Patrick Racing Intermedics Wildcat VIII/Cosworth, qualifying eighth and led one lap, but finishing 22nd after a crash on lap 141. His crash set up the controversial finish to the Indy 500 between teammate Mario Andretti and Bobby Unser.

After the 1981 CART season ended, Smiley was released from Patrick Racing, but was essentially traded to a Patrick-affiliated ride, Fletcher Racing.

== Death ==
In 1982, record speeds were being set during qualification for the 1982 Indianapolis 500. Both Kevin Cogan and Rick Mears set new single lap and 4-lap records in their attempts. Smiley went out for a qualifying attempt an hour later. On the second warm up lap, his car began to oversteer while rounding the third turn, causing the car to slightly slide. When Smiley steered right to correct this, the front wheels gained grip suddenly, sending his car directly across the track and into the wall nose first at nearly 200 mph (320 km/h). The impact shattered the March chassis, which completely disintegrated, causing the fuel tank to explode, and sent debris, including Smiley's exposed body, into the catch fence and then back onto the track, tumbling hundreds of feet across the short-chute connecting turns 3 and 4. Smiley died instantly from massive trauma inflicted by the severe impact. His death was the first at Indy since 1973 when Art Pollard and Swede Savage were killed and, to date, the last driver to die during qualifying.

CART medical director Steve Olvey, who was on staff at the time, discussed the crash in his 2006 autobiography, Rapid Response: My Inside Story as a Motor Racing Life-Saver:

During an attempt to qualify for the Indy 500, Gordon Smiley, a cocky young driver from Texas, was determined to break 200mph or die trying. Several veteran drivers ... had warned him that he was in way over his head, driving all wrong for the Speedway. Smiley was a road racer and was used to counter-steering his car to avoid a crash if the rear wheels broke traction. While rushing to the car, I noticed small splotches of a peculiar gray substance marking a trail on the asphalt leading up to the driver. When I reached the car, I was shocked to see that Smiley's helmet was gone, along with the top of his skull. He had essentially been scalped by the debris fence. The material on the race track was most of his brain. His helmet, due to massive centrifugal force, was literally pulled from his head on impact ... I rode to the care center with the body. On the way in I performed a cursory examination and realized that nearly every bone in his body was shattered. He had a gaping wound in his side that looked as if he had been attacked by a large shark. I had never seen such trauma."

Olvey later said in his book that in the aftermath of the wreck, he and the IndyCar paramedic team declared Smiley to have died at the scene, which subsequently led to other IndyCar medical personnel standardizing the procedure of not declaring a driver dead at the track unless he is incinerated or decapitated. Smiley's team-mate Desiré Wilson was in the pit garage when the remains of his car were brought back. In 2010, she recounted:

They brought the remains of Gordon's car back to our garage, and the biggest piece was a little ball of engine. There was nothing else except shattered bits, a bit of gearbox, a bit of a wheel, not even a seat. It was very ugly. The refuse truck turned up and they threw the remains on the back of the truck and took it away.

Fletcher Racing took the backup car and hired George Snider, who qualified for the race the next week.

Smiley's funeral was held on May 20, 1982, and he was buried in his birthplace in Nebraska.

== Racing record ==
=== SCCA National Championship Runoffs ===
Year	Track	Car	Engine	Class	Finish	Start	Status
1967	Daytona	Porsche	Porsche	C Production	15	13	Retired
1969	Daytona	Triumph Spitfire	Triumph	G Production	3	9	Running
1970	Road Atlanta	Triumph Spitfire	Triumph	G Production	14	1	Retired
1971	Road Atlanta	Merlyn Mk.21	Cosworth	Formula B	13	6	Retired
1971	Road Atlanta	Merlyn Mk.20	Ford	Formula Ford	2	1	Running
1972	Road Atlanta	Merlyn Mk.21	Cosworth	Formula B	15	4	Retired
1975	Road Atlanta	Titan Mk.9B	Ford	Formula Ford	24	11	Retired
1977	Road Atlanta	Lola T326	Volkswagen	Formula Super Vee	14	3	Running

=== Indianapolis 500 results ===
Year	Car	Start	Qual	Rank	Finish	Laps	Led	Retired
1980	70	20	186.848	9	25	47	0	Turbocharger
1981	60	8	192.988	13	22	141	1	Crash T4
1982	35	-	-	-	-	-	-	Wrecked qualifying (fatal)
Totals						188	15	

Starts	2
Poles	0
Front Row	0
Wins	0
Top 5	0
Top 10	0
Retired	2

=== Complete Formula One Non-Championship results ===
(key)

Year	Entrant	Chassis	Engine	1	2	3
1979	Melchester Racing	Tyrrell 008	Ford Cosworth DFV 3.0 V8	ROC; 10	GNM	DIN

== See also ==
- List of fatalities at the Indianapolis Motor Speedway
