= Don Whittington =

American racing driver (born 1946)

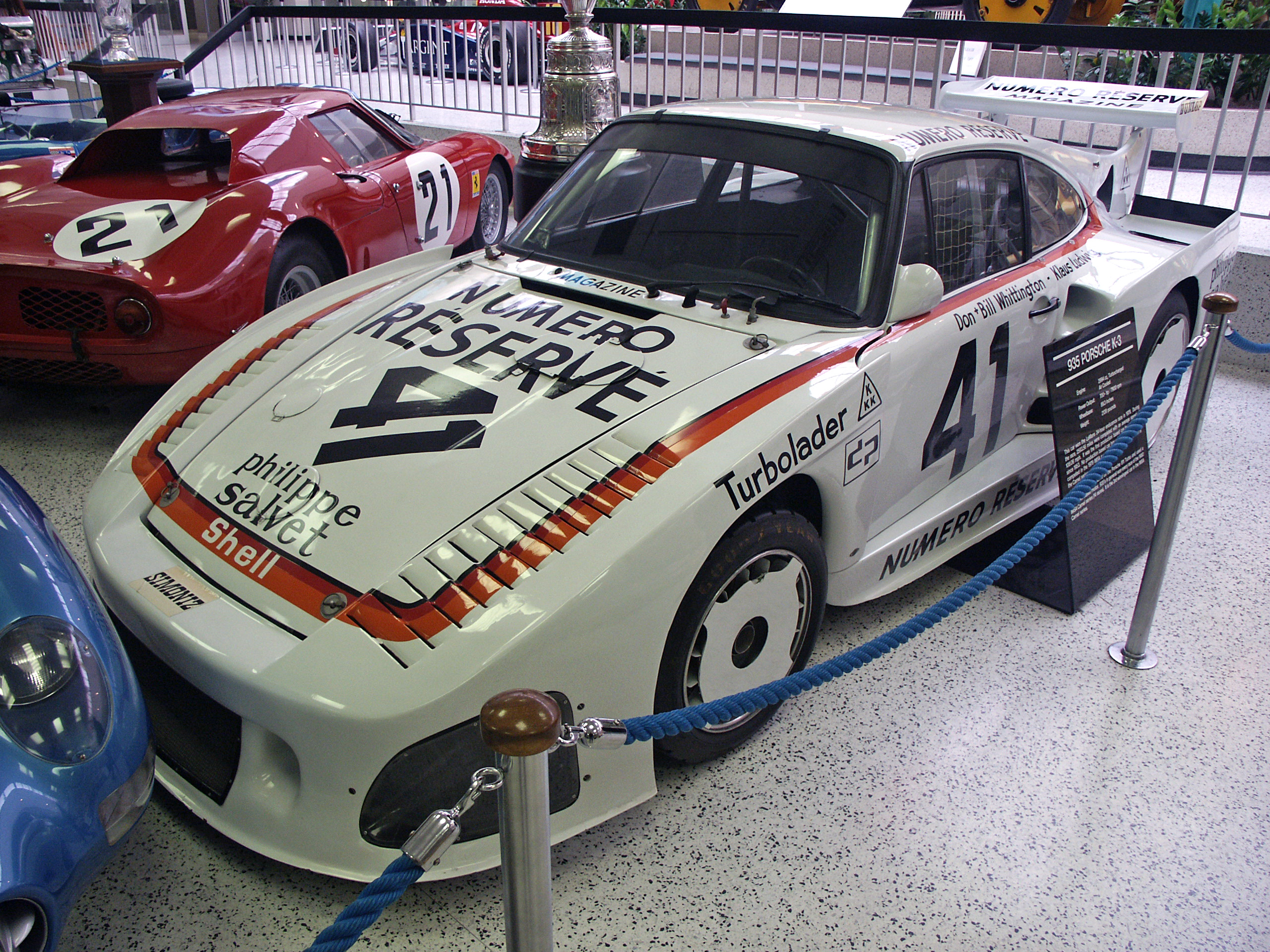
- Whittington's 1979 24 Hours of Le Mans-winning car
- Nationality: (United States) American
- Born: Reginald Donald Whittington; January 23, 1946 (age 80) Lubbock, Texas, U.S.
- Relatives: Bill Whittington (brother); Dale Whittington (brother)

Champ Car career
- 12 races run over 6 years
- Years active: 1979–1983, 1985
- Teams: No. 91 (Whittington Bros. Racing); No. 20 (Patrick Racing)
- Best finish: 48th (1980)
- First race: 1979 California 500 (Ontario)
- Last race: 1985 Dana 150 (Phoenix)
Wins	Podiums	Poles
0	0	0

24 Hours of Le Mans career
- Years: 1978–1981
- Teams: Whittington Bros. Racing, Kremer Racing
- Best finish: 1st (1979)
- Class wins: 1 (1979)

NASCAR Cup Series career
- 10 races run over 2 years
- Best finish: 46th (1980)
- First race: 1980 Winston Western 500 (Riverside)
- Last race: 1981 Winston Western 500 (Riverside)
Wins	Top tens	Poles
0	1	0

Reginald Donald Whittington (born January 23, 1946) is an American former racing driver from Lubbock, Texas, who won the 1979 24 Hours of Le Mans together with his brother Bill Whittington and Klaus Ludwig in a Porsche 935, although Ludwig, a multiple winner at Le Mans and elsewhere, did most of the driving in the heavy rain as the brothers did not have any real racing experience prior to the late 1970s. Don's brother Dale also competed in open wheel racing. His father, Don Whittington, Sr., was also an American racing driver in the USAC National Championship from 1957 to 1959.

== Racing career ==
Whittington also raced in five Indianapolis 500s, with a best finish of sixth. He also made ten NASCAR Winston Cup starts in 1980 and 1981. He earned a top-ten in the sport in his debut at Riverside. He also participated in the 1980 International Race of Champions.

In 1978, the brothers purchased and operated the Road Atlanta road-racing circuit, reportedly utilizing the secluded backstretch of the course as a landing strip for aircraft.

In 1984, Don's brother Bill co-owned, with Randy Lanier and Marty Hinze, the Blue Thunder Racing Team. Don raced for the team on occasion.

The Whittington brothers also raced aircraft at the Reno Air Races, including the highly modified P-51D "Precious Metal", which set a qualifying record of 438.018 mph (704.922 km/h) in 1976. Between 1976 and 1995, they raced four different P-51 Mustangs (including a rare H model and a Rolls-Royce Griffon powered P-51XR), an F8F Bearcat and a P-63 King Cobra. While they never scored a victory, Don in Precious Metal earned three podium finishes and was top qualifier twice.

The brothers were heavily involved in the 1970s 'warbird' movement, and participated in preservation groups like the Confederate Air Force and Valiant Air Command. They restored numerous aircraft over the years, including an FG-1D Corsair, HA-1112 (Spanish-built Bf 109), several P-51 Mustangs, and two B-17 Flying Fortresses (including a rare B-17E recovered in Bolivia).

In 1986, Whittington pleaded guilty to money laundering charges in association with his brother Bill's guilty plea to income tax evasion and conspiracy to smuggle marijuana into the United States from Colombia. Don Whittington received an 18-month prison sentence. Along with Randy Lanier, John Paul Sr. and John Paul Jr., the Whittington brothers were part of the IMSA drug smuggling scandal of the 1980s, where a number of drivers financed their racing activities with the proceeds from drug smuggling.

In 2009, Whittington sued the Indianapolis Motor Speedway Foundation over possession of the 1979 24 Hours of Le Mans winning Porsche 935. The car was given to the Speedway's museum in the early 1980s. Whittington claimed it was a loan and wanted to reclaim possession. The Speedway maintained it was a donation. On April 13, 2010, the United States Court of Appeals for the Seventh Circuit sided with the museum and found the evidence pointed to the car being a donation.

Currently, Whittington owns World Jet, a fixed-base operator at the Ft. Lauderdale Executive Airport.

== Motorsports career results ==
=== Complete 24 Hours of Le Mans results ===
Year	Team	Co-drivers	Car	Class	Laps	Pos.	Class pos.
1978	(United States) Whittington Bros. Racing	(United States) Bill Whittington (Austria) Franz Konrad	Porsche 935/77A	Gr.5+2.0	41	DNF	DNF
1979	(Germany) Kremer Racing	(United States) Bill Whittington (Germany) Klaus Ludwig	Porsche 935 K3	Gr.5+2.0	307	**1st**	**1st**
1980	(United States) Whittington Bros. Racing	(United States) Dale Whittington (United States) Hurley Haywood	Porsche 935 K3	IMSA	151	DNF	DNF
1981	(Germany) Kremer Racing	(United States) Ted Field (United States) Bill Whittington	Porsche 935 K3/81	Gr. 5	57	DNF	DNF

=== American open-wheel racing ===
(key) (Races in bold indicate pole position)

==== CART PPG Indy Car World Series ====
CART PPG Indy Car World Series results
Year	Team	Chassis	Engine	1	2	3	4	5	6	7	8	9	10	11	12	13	14	15	Pos.	Pts	Ref
1979	Team McLaren	McLaren M24B	Cosworth DFX V8t	PHX	ATL	ATL	INDY	TRE	TRE	MCH	MCH	WGL	TRE	ONT; 8	MCH	ATL	PHX		NC	0	
1980	Whittington Racing	Penske PC-7	Cosworth DFX V8t	ONT	INDY; 13	MIL	POC	MDO	MCH	WGL	MIL	ONT	MCH	MEX	PHX				47th	25	
1982	Whittington Racing	March 81C	Cosworth DFX V8t	PHX	ATL	MIL	CLE	MCH; 26	MIL	POC	RIV	ROA	MCH	PHX					NC	0	
1983	Whittington Racing	March 83C	Cosworth DFX V8t	ATL	INDY; 27	MIL	CLE	MCH; 20	ROA	POC; 33	RIV	MDO	MCH	CPL	LAG	PHX			NC	0	
1985	Patrick Racing	March 85C	Cosworth DFX V8t	LBH	INDY; 24	MIL; DNQ	POR	MEA	CLE	MCH; 20	ROA	POC	MDO	SAN	MCH; 20	LAG	PHX; 24	MIA	NC	0	

===== Indianapolis 500 =====
Year	Chassis	Engine	Start	Finish	Team
1980	Penske	Cosworth	18	13	Whittington Racing
1981	March	Cosworth	26	31	Whittington Racing
1982	March	Cosworth	8	6	Whittington Racing
1983	March	Cosworth	27	27	Whittington Racing
1985	March	Cosworth	6	24	Patrick Racing

=== NASCAR ===
(key) (Bold – Pole position awarded by qualifying time. Italics – Pole position earned by points standings or practice time. * – Most laps led.)

==== Winston Cup Series ====
NASCAR Winston Cup Series results
Year	Team	No.	Make	1	2	3	4	5	6	7	8	9	10	11	12	13	14	15	16	17	18	19	20	21	22	23	24	25	26	27	28	29	30	31	NWCC	Pts	Ref
1980	DiGard Motorsports	55	Chevy	RSD; 9	DAY; DNQ	RCH	CAR																												41st	67	
1980	Hamby Motorsports	17	Chevy		DAY; 16																														41st	67	
1980	A. J. Foyt Enterprises	51	Olds					ATL; 38	BRI	DAR	NWS	MAR																							41st	67	
1980	Whittington Bros. Racing	51	Olds										TAL; 34	NSV	DOV	CLT	TWS																		41st	67	
1980	Whittington Bros. Racing	64	Chevy															RSD; 35	MCH																41st	67	
1980	Whittington Bros. Racing	93	Olds																	DAY; 22	NSV	POC	TAL	MCH	BRI										41st	67	
1980	Smith Racing	93	Chevy																							DAR; 38	RCH	DOV	NWS	MAR	CLT	CAR	ATL	ONT	41st	67	
1981	Smith Racing	93	Chevy	RSD; 14																															54th	300	
1981	Smith Racing	93	Olds		DAY; 14	RCH	CAR	ATL	BRI	NWS	DAR	MAR	TAL	NSV	DOV	CLT	TWS	RSD	MCH	DAY	NSV	POC	TAL	MCH	BRI	DAR	RCH	DOV	MAR	NWS	CLT	CAR	ATL	RSD; 35	54th	300	

===== Daytona 500 =====
Year	Team	Manufacturer	Start	Finish
1980	DiGard Motorsports	Chevy	DNQ	
1980	Hamby Motorsports	Chevy	23	16
1981	Smith Racing	Oldsmobile	13	14

==== Winston West Series ====
NASCAR Winston West Series results
Year	Team	No.	Make	1	2	3	4	5	6	7	8	9	10	11	NWWC	Pts	Ref
1980	DiGard Motorsports	55	Chevy	RSD; 9	ONT	S99	RSD	LAG	EVG	POR	SON	MMR	ONT	PHO	NA	-	

=== International Race of Champions ===
(key) (Bold – Pole position. * – Most laps led.)

International Race of Champions results
Season	Make	Q1	Q2	Q3	1	2	Pos.	Pts	Ref
1979–80	Chevy	MCH	MCH	RSD; 3	RSD; 12	ATL; 5	8th	15	

Sporting positions
Preceded by Jean-Pierre Jaussaud; Didier Pironi	Winner of the 24 Hours of Le Mans; 1979 with: Klaus Ludwig; Bill Whittington	Succeeded by Jean Rondeau; Jean-Pierre Jaussaud
