= 1982 Indianapolis 500 =

American motor race

66th Indianapolis 500
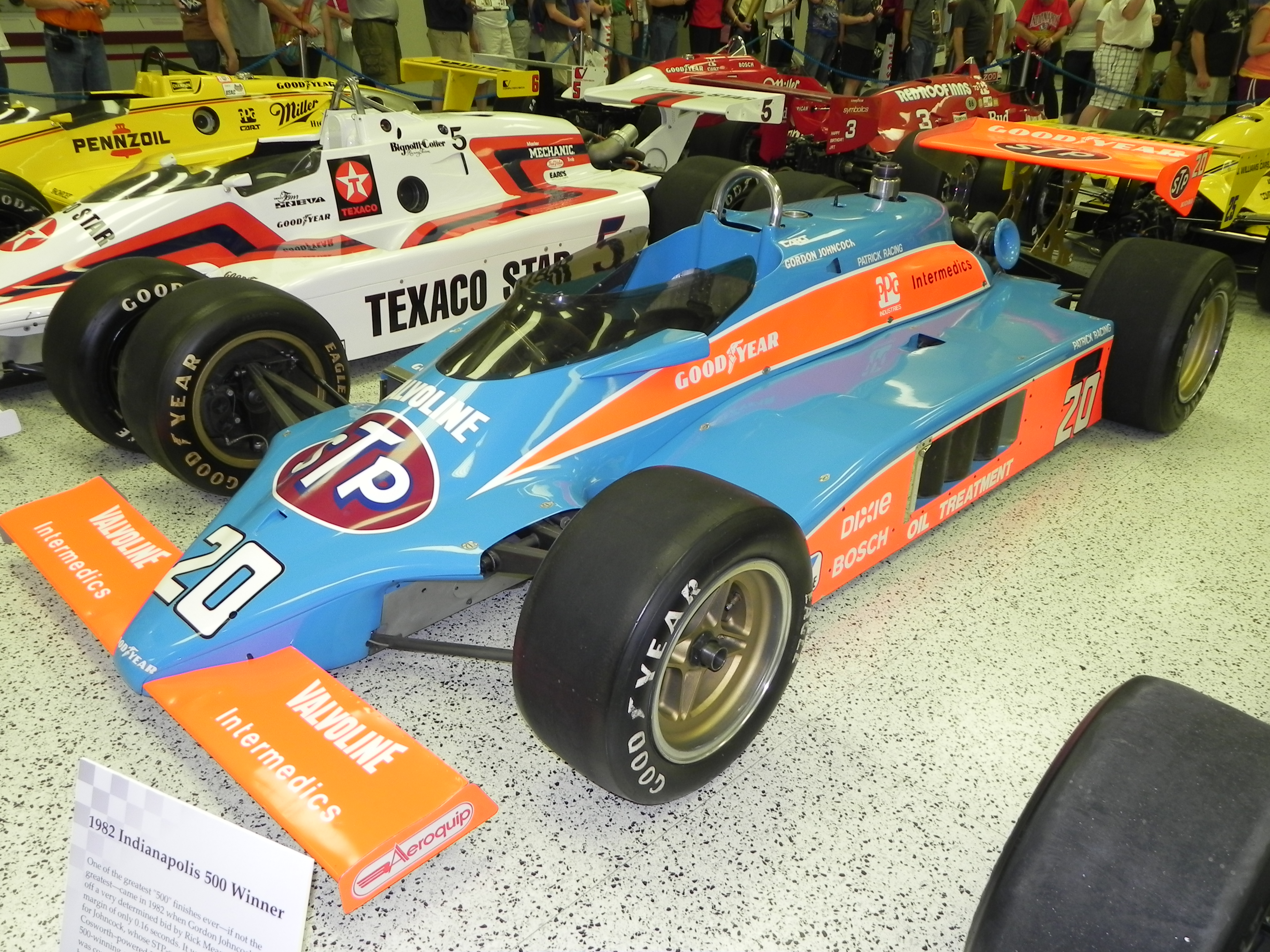

Indianapolis Motor Speedway

Indianapolis 500
- Sanctioning body: USAC
- Season: 1981-82 USAC season 1982 CART season
- Date: May 30, 1982
- Winner: (United States) Gordon Johncock
- Winning team: Patrick Racing
- Winning Chief Mechanic: George Huening
- Time of race: 3:05:09.14
- Average speed: 162.029 mph (260.760 km/h)
- Pole position: (United States) Rick Mears
- Pole speed: 207.004 mph (333.141 km/h)
- Fastest qualifier: (United States) Rick Mears
- Rookie of the Year: (United States) Jim Hickman
- Most laps led: (United States) Rick Mears (77)

Pre-race ceremonies
- National anthem: Louis Sudler
- "Back Home Again in Indiana": Louis Sudler
- Starting command: Mary F. Hulman
- Pace car: Chevrolet Camaro Z28 coupé
- Pace car driver: Jim Rathmann
- Starter: Duane Sweeney
- Estimated attendance: 350,000

Television in the United States
- Network: ABC
- Announcers: Host: Jackie Stewart; Lap-by-lap: Jim McKay; Color Analyst: Sam Posey
- Nielsen ratings: 12.3 / 25

Chronology
Previous	Next
1981	1983

The 66th Indianapolis 500 was held at the Indianapolis Motor Speedway in Speedway, Indiana on Sunday, May 30, 1982. Gordon Johncock, who had previously won the rain-shortened 1973 race, was the winner. Polesitter Rick Mears finished second by a margin of 0.16 seconds, just over a car length. It was the closest finish in Indy 500 history to that point.

In racing circles, the 1982 race is largely considered one of the best 500s in history. Johncock and Mears dueled over most of the final forty laps. Johncock pulled out to a sizeable lead after his final pit stop on lap 184 (of 200). But Mears dramatically began closing the gap in the waning laps. Johncock held off Mears on the final lap in a historic victory, as the raucous crowd drowned out the loud roar of the engines. The race is also remembered for a controversial crash at the start triggered by Kevin Cogan, which took out Mario Andretti, damaged the car of A. J. Foyt, and resulted in the crash of two other cars.

For the first and only time in Indy 500 history, a trio of brothers qualified for the same race. Don, Bill, and Dale Whittington all made the field, with Don finishing a strong 6th. Dale crashed out before the start, and never completed a single lap in his career. Four-time Indy winner A. J. Foyt started on the front row, celebrating his record 25th career Indy 500 start. Though he was caught up in the Cogan incident, his car was hastily repaired and he went on to lead 32 laps. On lap 95, his car suffered from a failed transmission linkage. Foyt famously climbed from the car and started working on it himself, but to no avail.

Officially the race was part of the 1981-82 USAC season, however, most of the entrants took part in the 1982 CART PPG Indy Car World Series. Championship points for the 1982 Indy 500 were not awarded towards the CART title and the race was considered a non-championship race in that series. Despite its historic reputation, the month of May 1982 was marred by the fatal crash of Gordon Smiley during time trials – the second of four fatal motorsports accidents in major series during the calendar year.

== Race schedule ==
Race schedule — April 1982
Sun	Mon	Tue	Wed	Thu	Fri	Sat
4	5	6	7 ROP	8 ROP	9 ROP	10; ROP
Race schedule — May 1982
						1
2	3	4	5	6	7	8 Practice
9 Practice	10; Practice	11; Practice	12; Practice	13; Practice	14; Practice	15; Pole Day
16; Time Trials	17; Practice	18; Practice	19; Practice	20; Practice	21; Practice	22; Time Trials
23; Bump Day	24	25	26	27; Carb Day	28; Mini-Marathon	29; Parade
30; Indy 500	31; Memorial Day					

Color	Notes
Green	Practice
Dark Blue	Time trials
Silver	Race day
Red	Rained out*
Blank	No track activity

* Includes days where track
activity was significantly
limited due to rain

ROP — denotes Rookie
Orientation Program

== Background ==
Among many stories going into the 1982 month of May was the return of A. J. Foyt to the cockpit. In July 1981, Foyt had been involved in a serious crash at the inaugural Michigan 500, suffering a compound fracture to his right arm, and a puncture wound to his leg. Foyt was sidelined for several months for recovery.

The two key fixtures from the controversial 1981 race took different paths for 1982. Bobby Unser did not attempt to qualify, making only a few laps in Josele Garza's car in a "management" role, and would ultimately retire from racing at the end of the year. Mario Andretti on the other hand, was back with Patrick Racing, this time running a full season in the CART series, and scaled back his participation in Formula One. This would be the first time in several years that Andretti would be spending the entire month in Indianapolis, and not traveling back and forth to Europe for his Formula One commitments.

A record 109 entries for the 1982 Indianapolis 500 were received by April 17, when entries closed. Seven former winners and 28 prospective rookies were among the driver entrants.

=== Rule changes ===
One major rule change regarding time trials was implemented for 1982. All cars would be allowed only two warm up laps for qualifying, down from three, which had been the rule since 1946.

After two major pit fires in 1981 (Rick Mears at the Indianapolis 500 and Herm Johnson at the Michigan 500), new safety rules were implemented. High-pressure water hoses were installed the length of the pit lane to aid in extinguishing fires. Significant improvements were also made to the fuel couplings, fuel hoses, vent hoses, and "buckeyes" on the cars themselves. Positive shutoff valves on the pitside fuel tanks (also known as "dead man's valves") were made mandatory. Teams were prohibited from jacking up the pitside fuel tanks (a practice which was used to increase head to make fuel flow faster into the car); the tanks were now required to be anchored to the ground. All pit personnel were required to wear fire-resistant clothing, including not only the over-the-wall crew, but others including scorers, etc. Likewise, it would become the norm that even pit reporters for television and radio began wearing specialized firesuits as well.

During the month of May 1981, word had been buzzing around the garage area that USAC was preparing to drastically change the engine formula for 1982 and beyond. The ruling would effectively ban the popular Cosworth DFX V-8, the engine that had won the Indianapolis 500 the previous four years (1978–1981). The plan was to craft the rules to require (or heavily favor) production-based, "stock block" engines, and reduce turbocharger boost to noncompetitive levels (effectively discouraging their use), or ban turbochargers outright. However, during the summer of 1981 the decision was reversed. The turbocharged overhead cam V-8 engines (namely the Cosworth DFX) would continue to be permitted, only with a smaller turbocharger unit. Teams applauded the decision, and the 1982 race would be contested with mostly the same engine specifications as the previous year.

== Time trials ==
=== Pole Day — Saturday May 15 ===
On pole day, Saturday, May 15, Kevin Cogan, driving for Penske Racing set a new one-lap track record of 204.638 mph (329.333 km/h), and a record four-lap average of 204.082 mph (328.438 km/h). A few minutes later, he was beaten by his Penske teammate Rick Mears. Mears secured the pole position with a four-lap average of 207.004 mph (333.141 km/h). A total of nine cars completed runs, including Gordon Johncock, rookie Bobby Rahal, and Danny Ongais.

==== Gordon Smiley accident ====
At 12:15 p.m., the time trials were marred by the horrifying fatal accident of Gordon Smiley. Smiley left the pits to start his qualifying run. On his second (of two) warm up laps, he approached turn three. The back-end of the #35 Intermedics March 81C-Cosworth became loose, and Smiley over-corrected. The front wheels suddenly gained traction, the car turned and crashed head-on into the concrete wall at about 200 mph (320 km/h). The impact of the March chassis against the wall was so hard and so violent, that the fuel tank exploded with a large fireflash, the car broke into three large sections, and the rest disintegrated into hundreds of pieces. Most of the shattered car went airborne for at least 50 feet (15 m), littering the track with debris. Smiley's exposed body tumbled with the wreck hundreds of feet through the short-chute connecting turns three and four. Pieces of the car were strewn all over the track. Smiley was killed instantly from the massive trauma inflicted by the impact. According to CART medical official Steve Olvey, who was working the event, the impact was so violent that nearly every bone in Smiley's body had been shattered. Olvey also noticed an unusual gray substance on the track, which marked a trail leading to the driver. The substance was later discovered to be most of Smiley's brain. His helmet was pulled from his head during the impact.

Smiley's death was the first at Indy since 1973, and to date, the last during a qualification attempt. Since it occurred in the remote area of turn three, and without video boards or live television, a vast majority of the fans in attendance did not see the crash up close or the immediate aftermath.

Olvey published his autobiography Rapid Response: My Inside Story as a Motor Racing Life-Saver in 2006, where noted numerous drivers advised Smiley that his road racing approach to driving around the Speedway was unsuitable for ovals in a ground-effects car. Smiley had competed in the SCCA National Championship Runoffs, winning two championships and then the Aurora AFX1 Championship, where he won at Silverstone Circuit, the latter of which were in older Formula One cars.

About 33 minutes after the wreck; at precisely 12:48 PM, track announcer Tom Carnegie learned of Smiley's fate for the first time. He immediately informed the fans watching from the grandstands: "Ladies and gentlemen... it is with our deepest regrets that we announce the passing of Gordon Smiley."

The track remained closed for over two hours after the crash. The catch fencing needed repair, debris littered the track, and a patch of asphalt was required to repair a gash in the racing surface.

==== Remainder of the day ====
After over two hours, a couple cars were dispatched by the officials to test the pavement, and they deemed it suitable for qualifying to resume. Several cars went out over the next two hours, but none challenged the speed records set earlier in the morning. A. J. Foyt put his car on the outside of the front row, and Mario Andretti qualified fourth. The original qualifying draw finally exhausted after Jerry Sneva waved off at 4:36 p.m. Geoff Brabham was the next car out; he had pulled in without taking green flag earlier in the morning. This time around, he burned a piston on his warm-up lap, and pulled in before taking the green flag. At that point, no one else was in the qualifying line.

In a solemn mood, qualifying came to a halt around 4:55 p.m., with just over an hour left in the session. At the close of pole day, the field was filled to 20 cars.

=== Second day — Sunday May 16 ===
After the tragic circumstances of the previous day, few drivers took to the track on Sunday, May 16. A very uneventful day saw only a handful of cars even take practice laps. Only a few cars made qualifying attempts and only two were run to completion. Rain ended the session a few minutes early, and the field was filled to 22 cars.

=== Third day — Saturday May 22 ===
The second week of practice saw increased track activity. The third day of time trials was scheduled for Saturday, May 22. A busy day of qualifying saw the field filled to 31 cars. Mike Chandler was fastest of the day at 198.042 mph (318.718 km/h). Notably, George Snider put the backup Bill Fletcher No. 35 Intermedics Innovator that was listed as Smiley's backup car and run with Patrick Racing in the field.

=== Bump Day — Sunday May 23 ===
On Sunday, May 23, the field was left with two empty positions at the start of the day. Several drivers intended to make attempts but few actually took to the track. Josele Garza and Pete Halsmer went out and quickly filled the field. Only two cars were bumped all day, and despite the track being open until 6 p.m., no drivers went out after 4:03 p.m. With two hours left in the day, Desiré Wilson announced she would not make an attempt, and thus would not have a chance to become the second female to qualify at Indy.

== Carburetion Day ==
The final practice was held Thursday May 27. Intermittent showers stretched the session into three segments, and it finally ended at 5:37 p.m. Of the 33 qualified cars, 31 took laps. Kevin Cogan (202.292 mph) was the fastest driver of the day, with Mario Andretti (202.247 mph) close behind in second. No incidents were reported, though Chet Fillip was not able to take any laps due to clutch problems. Dennis Firestone also did not participate, as his crew was still rebuilding their engine.

=== Pit Stop Contest ===
The eliminations rounds for the 6th annual Miller High Life Pit Stop Contest were held on Thursday May 26. A new format was introduced for 1982. For the first time, the top four race qualifiers and their respective pit crews were automatically eligible: Rick Mears, Kevin Cogan, A. J. Foyt, and Mario Andretti. If any of the top four elected not to participate, the slot would be filled by the next-highest race qualifier (5th) and so on. Four additional spots would be available to any race entrant, for a total of eight participants. Qualifying heats were scheduled for the week of May 16–22 in order to fill the four at-large berths. Kevin Cogan, who qualified second, declined the invitation. His spot was taken by Gordon Johncock, who qualified 5th

The eliminations consisted of two rounds. Teams were required to change two tires and simulate a fuel coupling. The preliminary round would feature two teams at a time, racing head-to-head against the clock. The two fastest teams overall - regardless of the individual head-to-head results - would advance to the final round. Rick Mears (14.94 seconds) was the fastest of the eight participants, and advanced to the finals.

Rick Mears defeated A. J. Foyt in the final round to win the event, the second win in a row for Penske Racing.

Preliminary Round
Rank	Car No.	Driver	Team
3	20	Gordon Johncock	Patrick Racing
4	7	Tom Sneva	Bignotti-Carter
5	40	Mario Andretti	Patrick Racing
6	2	Bill Alsup	Alsup Racing
7	19	Bobby Rahal	Truesports
8	64	Bob Frey	Jet Engineering

Finals
1	Rick Mears (Penske Racing)	13.93
14	A. J. Foyt (A. J. Foyt Enterprises)	18.05

== Starting grid ==
Following the Kevin Cogan crash on the pace lap, the cars of Cogan, Mario Andretti, Roger Mears, and Dale Whittington were eliminated. The car of A. J. Foyt was damaged, but his crew was able to make repairs during the red flag that Cogan's crash caused. Foyt returned for the second attempt at the race start. Holes were left in the grid as the eliminated drivers' spots were left vacant. 29 cars took the green flag on the second start attempt.

Row	Inside		Middle		Outside	
1	1	(United States) Rick Mears W	4	(United States) Kevin Cogan	14	(United States) A. J. Foyt W
2	40	(United States) Mario Andretti W	20	(United States) Gordon Johncock W	94	(United States) Bill Whittington
3	7	(United States) Tom Sneva	91	(United States) Don Whittington	25	(United States) Danny Ongais
4	3	(United States) Pancho Carter	12	(United States) Chip Ganassi R	5	(United States) Johnny Rutherford W
5	53	(United States) Danny Sullivan R	28	(United States) Herm Johnson R	52	(Mexico) Héctor Rebaque R
6	10	(United States) Al Unser W	19	(United States) Bobby Rahal R	30	(United States) Howdy Holmes
7	31	(United States) Roger Mears R	21	(Australia) Geoff Brabham	75	(Australia) Dennis Firestone
8	68	(United States) Michael Chandler	95	(United States) Dale Whittington R	42	(United States) Jim Hickman R
9	34	(United States) Johnny Parsons	35	(United States) George Snider	16	(United States) Tony Bettenhausen Jr.
10	69	(United States) Jerry Sneva	39	(United States) Chet Fillip R	8	(United States) Gary Bettenhausen
11	27	(United States) Tom Bigelow	66	(United States) Pete Halsmer	55	(Mexico) Josele Garza

Drivers eliminated during the Cogan crash (placed 30th through 33rd in race standings)
Drivers involved in the Cogan crash, but repaired in time for the second start attempt

=== Alternates ===
- Chip Mead R (#49) - First alternate
- Bill Alsup (#2) - Second alternate

=== Failed to Qualify ===
- Pat Bedard R (#36)
- Tom Bigelow (#56, #73)
- Scott Brayton (#37)
- Phil Caliva R (#38)
- Steve Chassey R (#11, #64)
- Bill Engelhart (#59)
- Dick Ferguson
- Bob Frey R (#64)
- Tom Frantz R (#77)
- Spike Gehlhausen (#47)
- Tom Gloy R (#80)
- Tom Grunnah R
- Ken Hamilton R (#63)
- Bob Harkey (#79)
- Hurley Haywood (#34)
- Gary Irvin R (#90)
- Jerry Karl (#32)
- Sheldon Kinser
- Steve Krisiloff (#34, #72)
- Phil Krueger R (#89)
- Lee Kunzman
- Bob Lazier (#34)
- Greg Leffler (#43)
- Ray Lipper R (#73)
- Al Loquasto (#86)
- John Mahler (#92)
- John Martin (#17)
- Jim McElreath (#98)
- Mike Mosley (#48)
- Teddy Pilette R (#67)
- Roger Rager (#72)
- Larry Rice
- Tim Richmond
- Joe Saldana (#58)
- Rusty Schmidt R (#27)
- Vern Schuppan (#18, #37, #99)
- Billy Scott (#88)
- Dick Simon (#22)
- Jan Sneva R (#92)
- Sammy Swindell R (#64)
- Bobby Unser W (#55)
- Leroy Van Conett R (#46)
- Dean Vetrock R (#71)
- Rich Vogler R
- Bill Vukovich II (#11, #18)
- Desiré Wilson R (#33)
- Gordon Smiley (#35)

NOTE: The #35 Intermedics Innovator/Bill Fletcher team formed an alliance with Patrick Racing; George Snider subsequently qualified the team's backup car into the race.

== Kevin Cogan crash ==
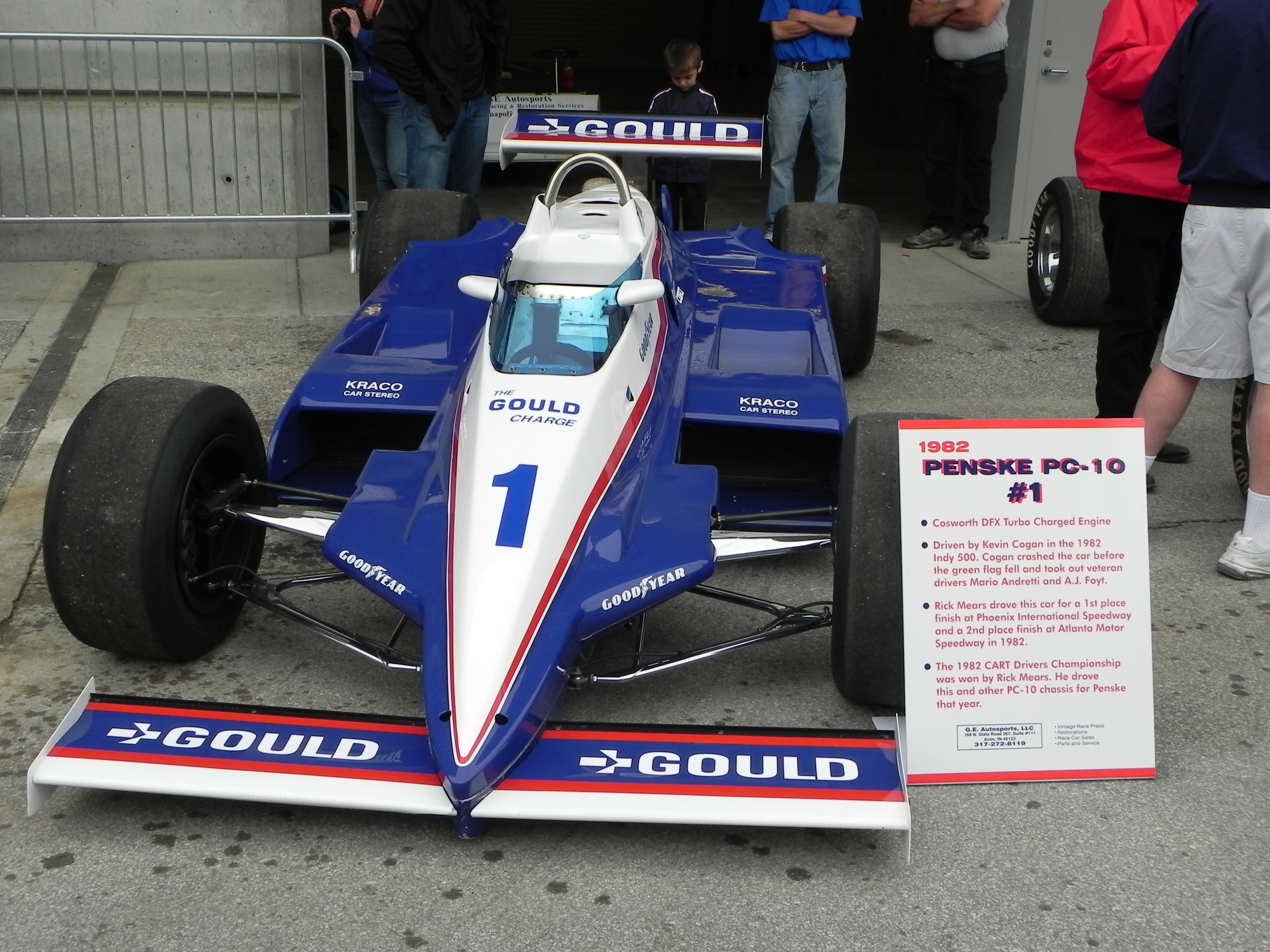
Car of Kevin Cogan on display at Indianapolis in 2013. It was restored to the livery used by Mears during the 1982 season, as the car was first used by Mears in Phoenix and Atlanta.

On race day, Kevin Cogan started from the middle of the front row, next to pole-sitter Mears, and A. J. Foyt. As the field approached the start/finish line to start the race, Cogan suddenly swerved right, touching and bouncing off A.J. Foyt's car. He then slid directly into the path of, and collected, Mario Andretti. Deeper in the field, the cars started to check-up. A fast-moving Dale Whittington nearly collected Geoff Brabham, lost control, spun across the track and ran into the back of Roger Mears. Both cars were eliminated. Bobby Rahal also reported getting hit from behind, but was undamaged. The green flag had not come out, and the race was immediately red-flagged.

Cogan's shocking accident took out four cars, including himself. Foyt's team was able to make repairs, and pushed his car out for the restart attempt; but Andretti was out of the race—his Patrick-prepared car was too badly damaged to continue. Meanwhile, both Andretti and Foyt were furious and outspoken about their displeasure with Cogan. Andretti, who was absolutely livid and perhaps even more angry than Foyt shunned Cogan's attempts to explain himself with a light shove, and Cogan walked with Andretti down the pit lane trying to explain himself but Andretti was having none of it.

Andretti, speaking on live radio, as well to ABC-TV's Bill Flemming, made the exchange:

Flemming: "One more time Mario, I couldn't hear what you said."
Andretti: "I said this is what happens when you have children doing a man's job up front. That's what happens."
Flemming: "Somebody cut right across in front of you?"
Andretti: "Yeah, Cogan, ah...you know, just...I guess, messed up and he's sideways in front of me, and I just had no choice but t-bone him."

Back in the garage area, Andretti complained about Cogan's abilities, claiming that Cogan was "looking for trouble", that he "couldn't handle the responsibilities of the front row," and that the Penske car he was driving was "too good for him".

The commonly outspoken Foyt also chimed in during comments to ABC-TV's Chris Economaki with:

Economaki: "A.J., how'd that start?"
Foyt: "Well I don't know. He ran right square into my goddamned left front."
Economaki: "Who are you talking about?"
Foyt: "Cogan." (mispronouncing Cogan's last name as "Coogin")
Economaki: "A.J. Foyt blames it on Kevin Cogan."

After he had cooled off, Foyt brushed it off a little saying "the guy pulled a stupid trick" and then back in the garage area of the crash and of Cogan that:

"It was a stupid deal. The guy had his head up his ass."

Gordon Johncock, Johnny Rutherford and Bobby Unser later placed some blame of the incident on the polesitter Rick Mears, for bringing the field down at such a slow pace. Unser, who was interviewed by ABC during their telecast was actually quoted as saying that the "start number one was way too slow" and that "it is very very sad that guys with that much experience can't do a better job at starting a race". Director of competition Roger McCluskey mentioned an overwhelming disdain from the drivers about the poor pace set at the start. Mears contended that his intentions were to keep the same pace, rather than radically speed up and slow down. In a 2009 interview, Gordon Johncock pointed out that Andretti had jumped the start, and could have avoided the spinning car of Cogan had he been lined up properly in the second row, stating that "he (Andretti) took himself out". Andretti's response was, "I'm not the one who spun. ... I wish I would have [stayed back with Johncock], but when it comes to the start, I start!"

=== Aftermath ===
Cogan quickly fell out of favor following the humiliation stemming from the accident. It was followed by a noticeable "blacklisting" by fans and press. Cogan nearly had the dubious distinction of taking out two of the most famous American auto racing legends and the two most successful IndyCar drivers of all time (Foyt and Andretti) on the first lap, in one move, in the biggest race of the season. The incident also further rehashed a standing feud between Penske Racing and Patrick Racing. A year earlier, Penske and Patrick had been the key fixtures in the controversial 1981 race.

Cogan did not manage to win a race in 1982, and was possibly fired by Roger Penske because of it and replaced by Al Unser in 1983.

The accident was never explained by the Penske team. Derrick Walker the team manager at the time, claimed that they found "no cause" for the accident. However, several experts had differing opinions. Rodger Ward, working for the IMS Radio Network immediately believed the rear brakes locked up. It was a common practice for drivers in the turbocharged era to "ride the brakes" during warm up laps in order to engage the turbocharger. Others theorized it may have happened due to a broken CV joint (as believed and said by Cogan at the time of the wreck) or halfshaft. Fellow drivers such as Johnny Rutherford and Gordon Johncock suggested that due to the slow start, Cogan may have been in first gear, and when he accelerated, the back end simply came around. Some feel that Sam Posey on ABC-TV inadvertently may have added to the controversy when he proclaimed "absolutely no idea" to the question of how it could have happened, and saying "it was as if he turned the wheel intentionally". The comments led many to conclude that the accident may have been entirely of Cogan's doing. As soon as he climbed from the car, Cogan was observed looking at the rear end axle, suggesting that he thought something broke, which Cogan believes was the problem.

One year later, in an autobiography detailing his career up to that point, Foyt gave a somewhat more analytical account of what occurred than he had before, while still assigning Cogan nearly all of the responsibility. According to Foyt, the slow straightaway pace previously noted by Unser and Rutherford had been beneath the power-amplification threshold of the turbocharger, which provides a progressively higher energy boost to the engine the higher the engine's RPM. Due to the pace, competitors had to run in lower gears much later than they normally did when approaching the start. Foyt in turn maintained that Cogan had intended to jump both Foyt and Mears into the first turn through the 'stupid trick' of using lower gears, via the significantly faster acceleration they provided compared to higher gears. When Mears' insufficient pace precluded this strategy, Foyt accused Cogan of simply 'jump[ing] on it' early, even before the green flag had fully come out, whereby the resulting explosive power increase caused the car to veer sideways and '[get] away from him'. Any broken half shaft, Foyt finally stated, was merely due to the subsequently unavoidable collision with Andretti.

Years later Donald Davidson, the historian for the Indianapolis Motor Speedway, mentioned that team driver, and the more experienced, Rick Mears had a nearly identical accident during private testing at Michigan. In 2009, Roger Penske seemed to brush off ideas, stating "Cogan said something broke, I don't know whether it did or didn't." In 2015, Cogan expressed his two-fold belief in a rare interview that the crash was caused by a broken power-generating CV joint and that Penske team manager Derrick Walker chose to hide the evidence to protect the team from scrutiny.

== Race summary ==
=== First half ===
According to the rules, the cars are required to maintain a minimum fuel economy of 1.8 miles per gallon. To complete two parade laps, one pace lap, and the 200 laps for the race, each car is allotted 280 US gallons (1,100 L) of methanol fuel in their pitside tank. Due to the aborted start, officials took the time to replenish approximately 5.6 US gallons (21 L) of fuel to each team's pitside tank.

Overall, the delay stemming from the Cogan accident lasted over 45 minutes. Only 29 cars lined up for the second start attempt.

A. J. Foyt took the lead at the start. It was the first time in his 25-year Indy career that he led the first lap of the race. After the hasty repairs from the Cogan incident, Foyt's car was precariously unproven, yet Foyt made no effort to "feel his car out" before charging into the lead. Meanwhile, popular second-year driver Josele Garza barely completed the first lap, and dropped out with an oil leak.

Rick Mears soon established himself as the fastest car in the field, and found the lead in the first half.

A. J. Foyt's day ended just short of the halfway point. A failed transmission linkage prevented him from pulling out of the pits. Foyt famously climbed from the cockpit, grabbed a hammer and a screwdriver, and started pounding away at the rear mechanics of the car. His attempts were futile, and the car was wheeled back to the garage area. Foyt revealed, during an interview immediately thereafter, that the Cogan crash had damaged the car's toe in alignment, and that it had been handling poorly all race up to that point. The 1982 race would be the final Indy 500 in which Foyt would lead any laps during the race.

=== Second half ===
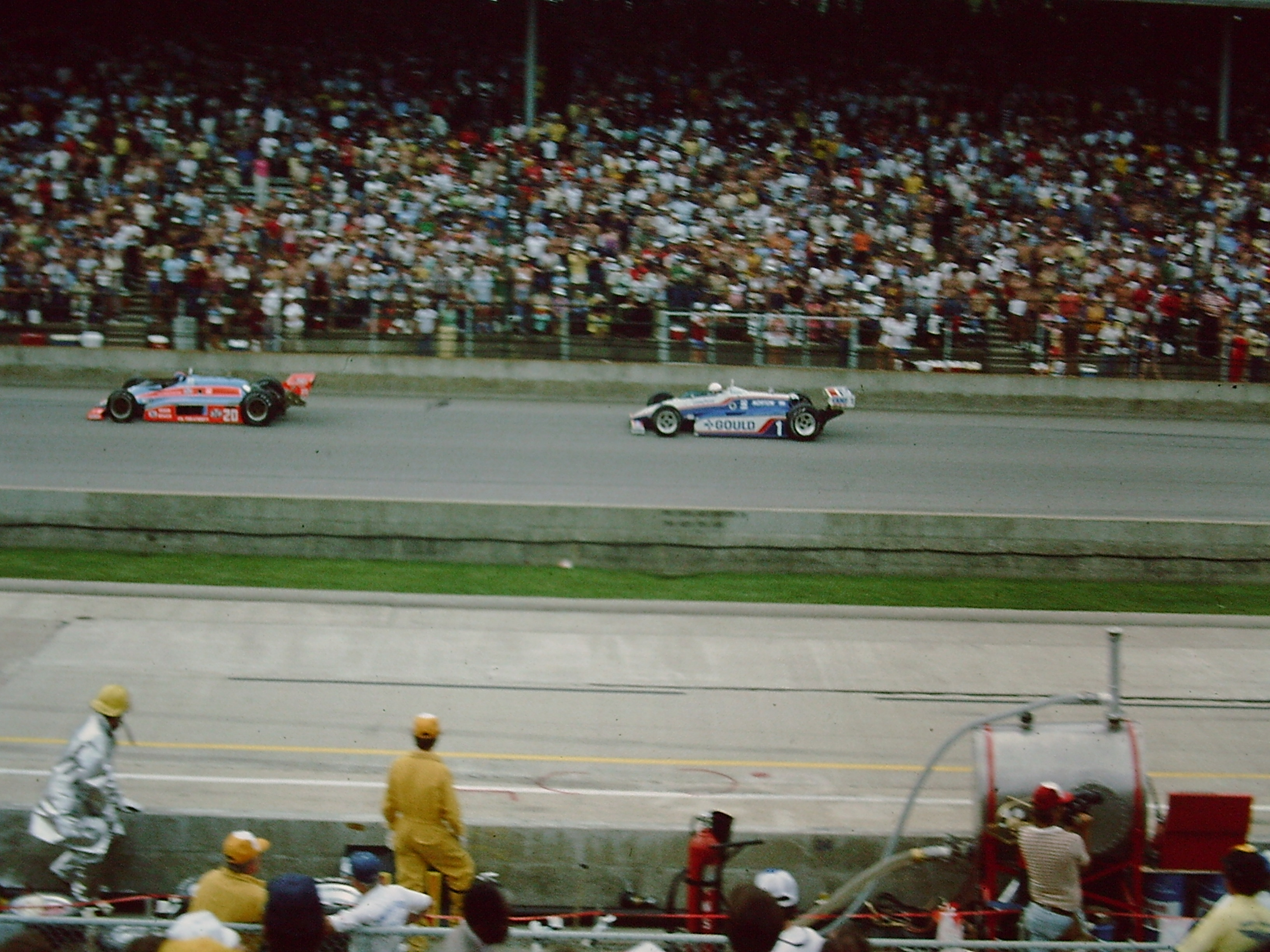
Gordon Johncock leads Rick Mears in the closing stages of the race.

Danny Sullivan brought out the final caution flag crashing in turn 4 on lap 154. On the subsequent restart with 42 laps to go, Gordon Johncock came up to speed faster and passed Rick Mears for the lead on the backstretch. Tom Sneva and Pancho Carter were both about a lap behind, battling for 3rd–4th. Most of the other cars were eliminated, or running several laps behind. Johncock was unable to put much distance between himself and Mears, and the two cars ran nose-to-tail for the next twenty laps. Mears was handling better in the turns, while Johncock had more top-end speed at the ends of the long straightaways. As the laps ticked down, both drivers needed to make one final pit stop for fuel in order to make it to the finish line.

With 18 laps to go Mears was the first driver to head into the pits. Racing down the pit lane, he found himself suddenly trapped behind the slower car of Herm Johnson. Mears locked up the brakes and bumped into Johnson's back wheel. The incident cost Mears several seconds. In his pit box, the Penske crew proceeded to fill his car full with 40 US gallons (150 L) of fuel, more than enough needed to make it to the finish. No tires were changed. The crew inspected the nose, and determined that no damage was sustained from hitting Johnson's car.

Two laps later, Johncock dove into the pits. He precariously diced around the slower car of Jim Hickman and slid into his pit box. The Patrick Racing crew executed a timed pit stop. The team calculated the amount of fuel needed to make it to the finish. When enough fuel had flowed into the car, a pit crew member tapped the fuel man on his back with a stick, and he disengaged. Johncock pulled away, with a pit stop many seconds quicker than that of Mears.

=== Finish ===
Back out on the track, Johncock held a lead of more than eleven seconds over Mears. It seemed that he was cruising to his second Indy victory. However, his car's handling was starting to suffer. The light fuel load he took on was exacerbating a pushing condition. Tom Sneva and Pancho Carter had also made their final pit stops, and were set to battle one another for third.

Mears' fully-fueled car was heavier, and handling much better in the turns. He started closing the gap by more than one second per lap. Johncock started driving very low in the turns, trying to alleviate the pushing condition. It became clear in the waning laps that Mears was dramatically closing in on the lead. Such a circumstance was nearly unprecedented in Indy 500 history, occurring only once before in the 1937 race. With only six other cars left running, traffic was not a factor. Mears closed to under 3 seconds with three laps to go. The crowd became electrified into a frenzy. The raucous crowd began to drown out the load roar of the engines, and observers around the track could tell which corner Johncock and Mears were based on the roar heard off in the distance. With two laps to go, the margin was less than 1 second.

Just in front of the leaders, the car of third place Tom Sneva began smoking. He pulled his car to the inside, and avoided the need for a yellow. Carter slipped by to take third. Sneva limped around the final couple of laps and salvaged fourth place.

With one lap to go, Mears pulled alongside Johncock on the mainstretch. The cars took the white flag side-by-side but Johncock refused to give up the lead. Once again pulling slightly ahead at the end of the straightaway, he "chop-blocked" Mears in the first turn and stayed in front. Mears lost some momentum but began to reel Johncock back in down the backstretch. In turn three, Johncock drove so low that he hit a bump on the inside of the apron and nearly crashed. As they exited turn four, Mears tried to slingshot pass Johncock for the win. Johncock held off the challenge and won by 0.16 seconds, the closest finish in Indy 500 history at the time. Mears lost by just over one car length. It would stand as the closest finish in race history for ten years. As of 2026, it is the 7th-closest finish in race history, behind only those of the 1992, 2006, 2014, 2015, 2023, and 2026 races.

Gordon Johncock's Wildcat 8B-Cosworth, winning car at the 1982 Indianapolis 500.

To Chris Economaki in Victory Lane, Johncock admitted to having been worried about his car's deteriorating handling as he watched Mears get closer and closer in his mirrors. He said that he had had no intention of backing off in turn one on the final lap and was prepared to go through the corner side by side if necessary. Mears, when interviewed by Bill Flemming after the race, seemed less disappointed about finishing second than thrilled to have been a part of the most dramatic finish in Indy history. Mears had noticed that Johncock's handling was going away, quipping that Johncock "had 'er everywhere but straight", and praised him for the ability to overcome such a challenge. Mears also conceded that Johncock's block in turn one was not a dirty move and admitted that "it was [Johncock's] corner." In interviews in later years Mears said that he would not change the result of the race even if he could, although he jokingly claimed to have watched the tape over and over again "to see if this time I get by Gordy".

== Box score ==
Pos	No.	Driver	Team	Chassis	Engine	Laps	Status	Grid	Pts.
1	20	(United States) Gordon Johncock W	Patrick Racing	Wildcat 8B	Cosworth DFX	200	162.026 mph	5	1000
2	1	(United States) Rick Mears W	Team Penske	Penske PC-10	Cosworth-Ford DFX	200	+0.16	1	800
3	3	(United States) Pancho Carter	Morales-Capels	March 82C	Cosworth DFX	199	-1 lap	10	700
4	7	(United States) Tom Sneva	Bignotti-Cotter	March 82C	Cosworth DFX	197	Engine	7	600
5	10	(United States) Al Unser W	Longhorn Racing	Longhorn LR-03	Cosworth DFX	197	-3 laps	16	500
6	91	(United States) Don Whittington	Whittington Brothers	March 82C	Cosworth DFX	196	-4 laps	8	400
7	42	(United States) Jim Hickman R	Rattlesnake Racing	March 81C	Cosworth DFX	189	-11 laps	24	300
8	5	(United States) Johnny Rutherford W	Chaparral Cars	Chaparral	Cosworth DFX	187	Engine	12	250
9	28	(United States) Herm Johnson R	Team Menard	Eagle 81	Chevrolet	186	-14 laps	14	200
10	30	(United States) Howdy Holmes	Doug Shierson Racing	March 82C	Cosworth DFX	186	-14 laps	18	150
11	19	(United States) Bobby Rahal R	Truesports	March 82C	Cosworth DFX	174	Engine	17	100
12	8	(United States) Gary Bettenhausen	Lindsey Hopkins Racing	Lightning	Cosworth DFX	158	Engine	30	50
13	52	(Mexico) Héctor Rebaque R	Forsythe Racing	March 82C	Cosworth DFX	150	Fire	15	25
14	53	(United States) Danny Sullivan R	Forsythe Racing	March 82C	Cosworth DFX	148	Crash T4	13	25
15	12	(United States) Chip Ganassi R	Rhoades Racing	Wildcat	Cosworth DFX	147	Engine	11	25
16	94	(United States) Bill Whittington	Whittington Brothers	March 81C	Cosworth DFX	121	Engine	6	25
17	68	(United States) Michael Chandler	Newman Freeman Racing	Eagle 81	Chevrolet	104	Gearbox	22	20
18	27	(United States) Tom Bigelow	HBK Racing	Eagle 81	Chevrolet	96	Engine	31	20
19	14	(United States) A. J. Foyt W	Gilmore-Foyt Racing	March 82C	Cosworth DFX	95	Transmission	3	20
20	34	(United States) Johnny Parsons	Wysard Racing	March 82C	Cosworth DFX	92	Spin	25	20
21	35	(United States) George Snider	Fletcher Racing	March 82C	Cosworth DFX	87	Engine	26	15
22	25	(United States) Danny Ongais	Interscope Racing	Interscope	Cosworth DFX	62	Crash T2	9	15
23	69	(United States) Jerry Sneva	Hoffman Auto Racing	March 81C	Cosworth DFX	61	Crash T2	28	15
24	39	(United States) Chet Fillip R	Circle Bar Auto Racing	Eagle 81	Cosworth DFX	60	Crash T2	29	15
25	66	(United States) Pete Halsmer	Arciero Racing	Eagle 81	Chevrolet	38	Transmission	32	10
26	16	(United States) Tony Bettenhausen Jr.	H&R Racing	March 82C	Cosworth DFX	37	Crash FS	27	10
27	75	(Australia) Dennis Firestone	B.C.V. Racing	Eagle 81	Milodon	37	Rear end	21	10
28	21	(Australia) Geoff Brabham	Bignotti-Cotter	March 82C	Cosworth DFX	12	Engine	20	10
29	55	(Mexico) Josele Garza	Garza Racing	March 82C	Cosworth DFX	1	Engine	33	5
30	4	(United States) Kevin Cogan	Team Penske	Penske PC-10	Cosworth-Ford DFX	0	Crash FS	2	5
31	40	(United States) Mario Andretti W	Patrick Racing	Wildcat 8B	Cosworth DFX	0	Crash FS	4	5
32	31	(United States) Roger Mears R	Machinists Union Racing	Penske PC-9B	Cosworth DFX	0	Crash FS	19	5
33	95	(United States) Dale Whittington R	Whittington Brothers	March 82C	Cosworth DFX	0	Crash FS	23	5

W Former Indianapolis 500 winner

R Indianapolis 500 Rookie

All cars utilized Goodyear tires.

=== Race statistics ===
Lap Leaders
Laps	Leader
1–22	A. J. Foyt
23	Gordon Johncock
24–25	Don Whittington
26	Danny Ongais
27–35	A. J. Foyt
36–41	Rick Mears
42–59	Tom Sneva
60–63	Rick Mears
64	A. J. Foyt
65–94	Rick Mears
95–108	Gordon Johncock
109–127	Rick Mears
128	Gordon Johncock
129–141	Rick Mears
142–154	Tom Sneva
155–159	Rick Mears
160–200	Gordon Johncock

Total laps led
Driver	Laps
Rick Mears	77
Gordon Johncock	57
A. J. Foyt	32
Tom Sneva	31
Don Whittington	2
Danny Ongais	1

Cautions: 6 for 35 laps
Laps	Reason
Pace lap	Cogan, Andretti, Mears, Whittington, crash on frontstretch (Red flag)
40–45	Tony Bettenhausen on crash frontstretch
63–70	Danny Ongais, Jerry Sneva crash in turn 2
95–102	George Snider stalled on track
132–135	Bill Whittington blown engine
138–141	Johnny Parsons spun in turn 2
154–158	Danny Sullivan crash in turn 4

== Legacy ==
The 1982 Indianapolis 500 is often considered one of the greatest editions of the race by historians, media, and fans. Race winner Gordon Johncock, who also won the tragic and forgettable 1973 race, was able to complement his record by winning one of the most exciting races. The win was bittersweet, however, for Johncock. The day after the race, Johncock's mother Frances died after a lengthy illness. Johncock learned of her death at the 500 Victory Banquet Monday night.

Kevin Cogan, who was a key fixture in the opening lap accident, was fired at the end of the season by Roger Penske and replaced by Al Unser for 1983. Mario Andretti's misfortune strengthened the perceived Andretti curse at Indy.

Despite the historic battle at the finish, and the shocking crash at the start, the horrific fatal crash of Gordon Smiley still put a damper on the month. Smiley's death was one of four fatal motorsport accidents to occur over a span of four months. It came just one week after the fatal crash of Gilles Villeneuve during the first qualifying session at the Belgian Grand Prix at Zolder. About one month later, an accident at the start of the Canadian Grand Prix in Montreal killed Riccardo Paletti. Then about two months later, Jim Hickman, the 1982 Indianapolis 500 Rookie of the Year, was killed at the Milwaukee Mile.

== Broadcasting ==
=== Radio ===
The race was carried live on the IMS Radio Network. Paul Page served as anchor for the sixth year. Lou Palmer reported from victory lane. The broadcast came on air at 10:15 a.m. local time, providing a 45-minute pre-race for the final time. The following year the pre-race coverage was expanded to a full hour. Several assignments were shifted, and a new member was added, Sally Larvick, who served as a roving reporter, interviewing celebrities and other dignitaries. Larvick, wife of Paul Page, was believed to be the second female reporter in the history of the network. At the start of the race, roving reporter Bob Forbes rode in one of the pace cars on the parade lap. Veteran Howdy Bell moved to the backstretch, Doug Zink moved from turn three to turn two, and Larry Henry took over the third turn position.

For 1982, the famous commercial out cue of the network was changed to "Now stay tuned for the Greatest Spectacle in Sports!"

The broadcast crew was critically acclaimed for their collective call of the closing laps of the 1982 race.

Indianapolis Motor Speedway Radio Network
Booth Announcers	Turn Reporters	Pit/garage reporters
Chief Announcer: Paul Page; Driver expert: Rodger Ward; Statistician: John DeCamp; Historian: Donald Davidson	Turn 1: Ron Carrell; Turn 2: Doug Zink; Backstretch: Howdy Bell; Turn 3: Larry Henry; Turn 4: Bob Jenkins	Sally Larvick (interviews) R Bob Forbes (garages)
Chief Announcer: Paul Page; Driver expert: Rodger Ward; Statistician: John DeCamp; Historian: Donald Davidson	Turn 1: Ron Carrell; Turn 2: Doug Zink; Backstretch: Howdy Bell; Turn 3: Larry Henry; Turn 4: Bob Jenkins	Jerry Baker (north pits); Chuck Marlowe (north-center pits); Luke Walton (south-center pits); Lou Palmer (south pits)

=== Television ===
The race was carried in the United States on ABC Sports on a same-day tape delay basis. After controversy the previous year, Jackie Stewart was moved from the booth to a new host position in "ABC Race Central." Sam Posey returned to the booth as driver expert, and Jack Whitaker joined the crew for in-depth features and commentary. Whitaker rode along and reported live from inside the pace car at the start of the race. Clyde Lee, anchorman for WRTV (ABC's affiliate in Indianapolis), was also on hand to report on drivers who happened to drop out of the race, as well as from the infield hospital.

ABC had planned to place an onboard camera on the car of Gordon Smiley for the race, what would have been the first time an onboard camera had been carried in the Indianapolis 500. Smiley's fatal crash in qualifying cancelled those plans and onboard cameras made their debut in 1983.

Producer Mike Pearl would receive a Sports Emmy award for his efforts in the telecast, which won three total.

Pole day time trials on ABC featured Al Michaels, Jackie Stewart, and Sam Posey.

The broadcast has re-aired numerous times on ESPN Classic since April 2000. In May 2004, the broadcast was featured on ESPN Classic's "Big Ticket" series, featuring interviews with Gordon Johncock and Rick Mears, hosted by Gary Miller.

ABC Television
Booth Announcers	Pit/garage reporters
Host: Jackie Stewart; Announcer: Jim McKay; Color: Sam Posey	Chris Economaki; Bill Flemming; Jack Whitaker (features); Clyde Lee (garages, hospital)

== Gallery ==
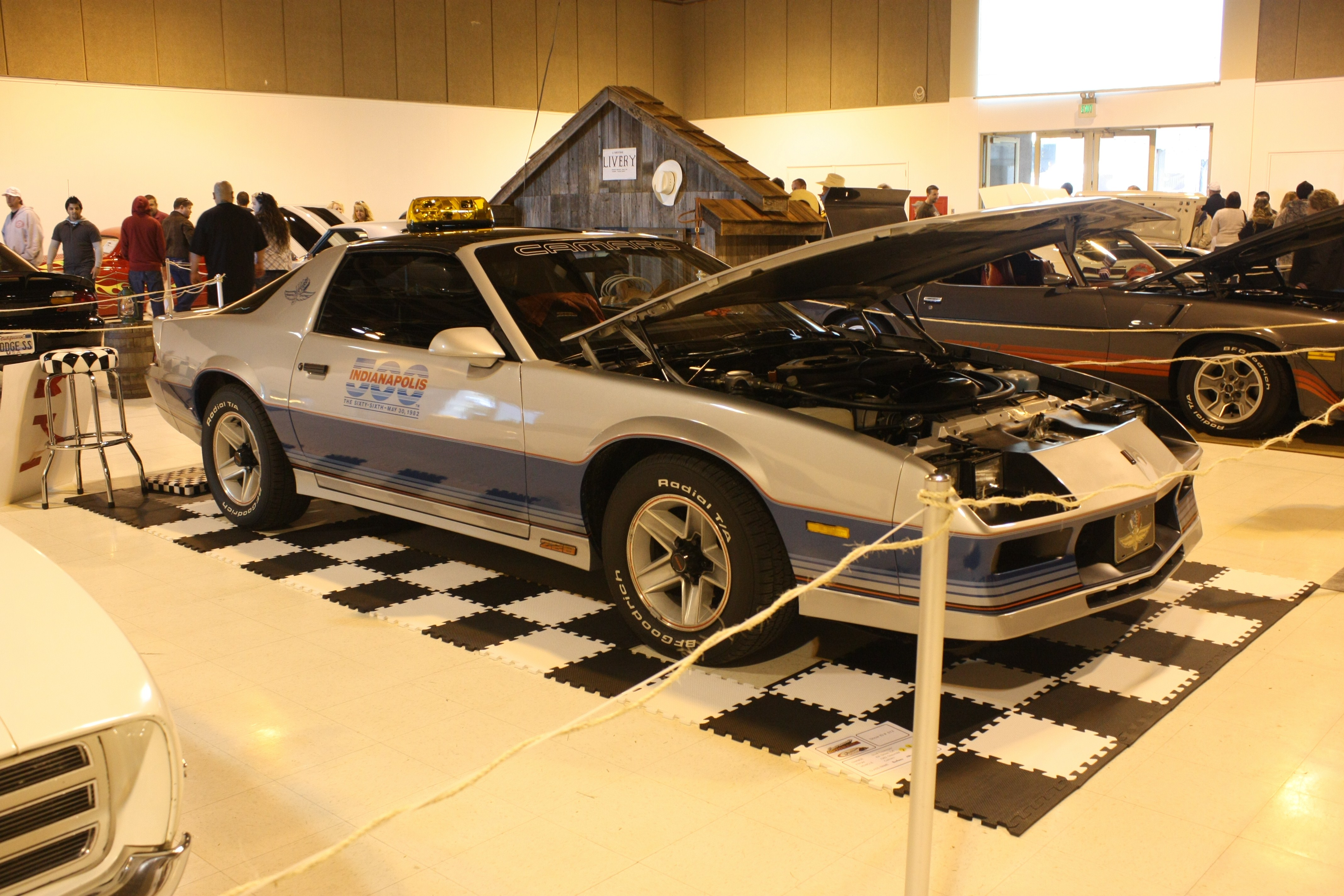
1982 Chevrolet Camaro pace car

== See also ==
- 1981-82 USAC Championship Car season

== Bibliography ==
- 1982 Indianapolis 500 Day-By-Day Trackside Report For the Media
- Indianapolis 500 History: Race & All-Time Stats - Official Site
- 1982 Indianapolis 500 Radio Broadcast, Indianapolis Motor Speedway Radio Network

1981 Indianapolis 500; Bobby Unser	1982 Indianapolis 500; Gordon Johncock	1983 Indianapolis 500; Tom Sneva
