= March 82C =

The March 82C is an open-wheel race car, designed by and built by March Engineering, to compete in the 1982 IndyCar season. The March chassis won 5 out of the 11 races that season, with Bobby Rahal, Tom Sneva, Héctor Rebaque. The March 82C chassis successfully clinched the 1982 Constructors' Championship. It was powered by both the Ford-Cosworth DFX turbo V8 engine, and the Buick Indy V6 engine.
