= Jim Hickman (racing driver) =

James Franklin Hickman, II (May 9, 1943 – August 1, 1982) was an American race car driver known as Jim Hickman.

== Racing career ==
Hickman was a driver in the 1982 CART Indycar series and raced in three CART contests that year as well as the Indianapolis 500, which, that year, was not a CART event. He finished three of his four races in the top-ten and was named Indy 500 Rookie of the Year, where he finished seventh.

=== Death ===
Hickman died in an accident during a practice session at the second Milwaukee Mile race of the 1982 season, the Tony Bettenhausen 200 at Wisconsin State Fair Park. Published reports indicated that CART observers and technical personnel determined that a stuck throttle was the cause of the accident. Driving a 1981 March 81C-Cosworth for Hoffman racing sponsored by Stroh's Beer, his car slammed into the concrete wall in the first turn of the one-mile (1.6 km) oval. It took safety officials about 15 minutes to pry the 39-year-old former Navy fighter pilot out of the wreckage. He was pronounced dead about 12 hours later in a Milwaukee hospital. Dr. Steve Olvey, medical director for CART, said Hickman died of head injuries. The accident occurred with less than five minutes remaining in the final practice session.

== Personal life ==
Hickman was born to Ioma Hickman (1922–2006) and James Franklin (1923–1966), in Panama, Oklahoma. He had two younger brothers, Hercel Harvey Hickman and Terry Lynn Hickman (deceased). He was a 1966 graduate of Oklahoma State University in Stillwater, OK.

== Family ==
Hickman was survived by his wife, Lynda, and two children, Ashley and James Franklin III.

== Racing record ==
=== SCCA National Championship Runoffs ===
Year	Track	Car	Engine	Class	Finish	Start	Status
1980	Road Atlanta	Crosslé 40F	Ford	Formula Ford	20	29	Running
1981	Road Atlanta	Ralt RT5	Volkswagen	Formula Continental	1	1	Running
1981	Road Atlanta	Crosslé 45F	Ford	Formula Ford	20		Running

=== Indianapolis 500 results ===
Year	Chassis	Engine	Start	Finish
1982	March	Cosworth	24th	7th

Sporting positions
Preceded by Josele Garza	Indianapolis 500; Rookie of the Year; 1982	Succeeded by Teo Fabi
