= Phil Krueger =

American racing driver (1951–2026)

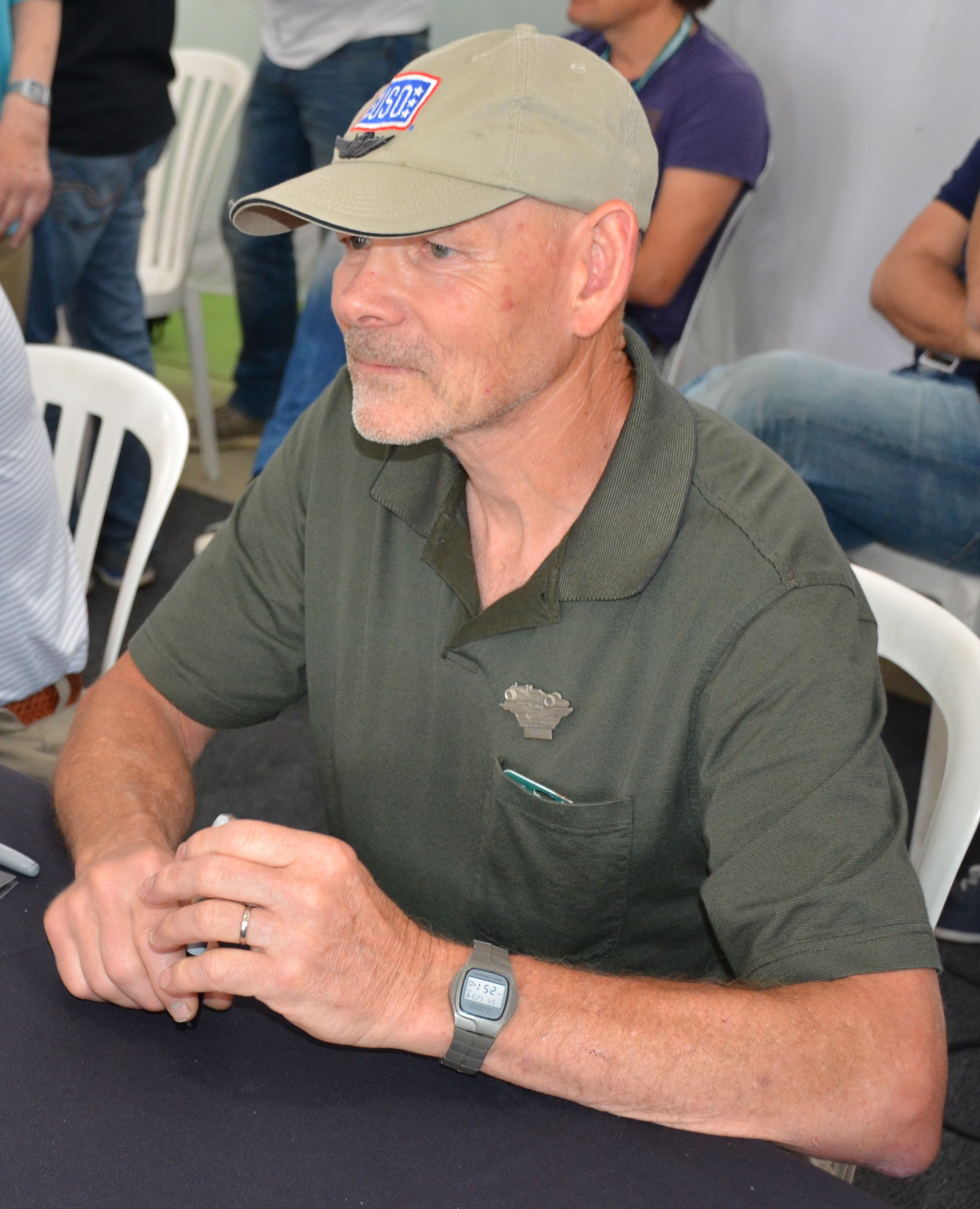
Krueger at the 2015 Indianapolis 500

Phillip Eugene Krueger (June 22, 1951 – February 9, 2026) was a former driver in the CART Indy car series. He raced in nine seasons (1981–1986, 1988–1989, and 1991), with 23 career starts, including the 1986 and 1988 Indianapolis 500. He finished in the top-ten three times, with a best finish of fifth position at the 1988 Michigan 500.

Krueger endured three hard crashes in his open-wheel racing career that left him critically injured: during practice for the 1981 Indianapolis 500, and again in 1984 and 1989, both at the Michigan 500. He would return to racing after every incident.

In 1988, Krueger won the Clint Brawner Mechanical Excellence Award presented annually to the Indianapolis 500 chief mechanic who exemplifies "mechanical and scientific creativity, ingenuity, perseverance, dedication, enthusiasm and expertise". Driving for R. Kent Baker Racing, he essentially served as his own chief mechanic. He qualified a two-year old March 86C-Cosworth in 15th starting position, and finished eighth on race day.

Krueger died on February 9, 2026, aged 74.

== Racing record ==
=== SCCA National Championship Runoffs ===
Year	Track	Car	Engine	Class	Finish	Start	Status
1980	Road Atlanta	LeGrand Mk.27B	Ford	Formula Ford	25	31	Running

=== Complete USAC Mini-Indy Series results ===
Year	Entrant	1	2	3	4	Pos	Points
1977	Eric Lee Drange	TRE	MIL; 6	MOS; 17	PIR; 4	7th	200

=== Indianapolis 500 results ===
Year	Chassis	Engine	Start	Finish
1981	Eagle	Chevrolet	Practice Crash	
1982	Penske	Chevrolet	Practice Crash	
1983	Penske	Cosworth	Failed to Qualify	
1984	March	Cosworth	Failed to Qualify	
1985	March	Cosworth	Failed to Qualify	
1986	March	Cosworth	24th	31st
1987	Lola	Cosworth	Practice Crash	
1988	March	Cosworth	15th	8th
1989	Penske	Cosworth	Failed to Qualify	
1991	Lola	Buick	Failed to Qualify	
