= Spike Gehlhausen =

American racing driver

Daniel William "Spike" Gehlhausen (born November 19, 1954, in Jasper, Indiana), is a former driver in the USAC and CART Championship Car series. He raced in 11 seasons (1975–1982 and 1984–1986), with 79 combined career starts, including the Indianapolis 500 in 1976, 1978–1980, and 1984. He finished in the top-ten 15 times with his best finish in fourth position in 1980 at Ontario.

== Indianapolis 500 results ==
Year	Chassis	Engine	Start	Finish
1976	McLaren	Offy	25th	33rd
1977	McLaren	Offy	Qualifying crash	
1978	Eagle	Offy	16th	29th
1979	Wildcat	Cosworth	31st	10th
1980	Penske	Cosworth	4th	29th
1981	Penske	Cosworth	Failed to qualify	
1982	Penske	Cosworth	Failed to qualify	
1983	Eagle	Cosworth	Failed to qualify	
1984	March	Cosworth	25th	31st
1986	Lola	Cosworth	Failed to qualify	
1987	March	Cosworth	Failed to qualify	
1988	March	Cosworth	Practice crash	

== Other results ==
Gehlhausen finished fourth in a race in Ontario in 1980.
