= 1984 Pocono 500 =

(United States) 1984 Pocono 500
Race details
- 10th round of the 1984 CART PPG Indy Car World Series season
- Date: August 19, 1984
- Official name: 1984 Domino's Pizza 500
- Location: Long Pond, Pennsylvania, U.S.
- Course: Permanent racing facility 2.5 mi / 4.023 km
- Distance: 200 laps 500 mi / 804.672 km
- Weather: Temperatures up to 75 °F (24 °C); wind speeds up to 13 miles per hour (21 km/h)

Pole position
- Driver: (United States) Rick Mears (Team Penske)
- Time: 202.872 mph

Podium
- First: (United States) Danny Sullivan (Doug Shierson Racing)
- Second: (United States) Rick Mears (Team Penske)
- Third: (United States) Bobby Rahal (Truesports)

The 1984 Pocono 500, the 14th running of the event, was held at Pocono Raceway in Long Pond, Pennsylvania, on Sunday, August 19, 1984. Branded as the 1984 Domino's Pizza 500 for sponsorship reasons, the race was won by Danny Sullivan.

== Background ==
Drivers criticized Pocono Raceway's track conditions in 1983. Major bumps on the frontstretch affected cars to the point where the race had to start two-wide instead of three. Before the 1984 season, Pocono repaved the frontstretch.

Rick Mears won the Indianapolis 500. Mario Andretti won the Michigan 500. Domino's Pizza's offer of one million dollars to any driver who could win all three 500 miles races in Indy car's Triple Crown went unclaimed.

== Practice and Time Trials ==
=== Practice - Wednesday, August 15 ===
In practice on Wednesday, August 15, Kevin Cogan spun 360 degrees and crashed in turn two. Cogan suffered broken heels in both feet, a torn Achilles tendon on his left foot, and a shattered Talus bone on his right foot. On Thursday, he was flown to Los Angeles for rehabilitation. Cogan was driving for the Forsythe Racing Team, defending winners of the Pocono 500, replacing Teo Fabi who returned to Formula One.

Ed Pimm also crashed on Wednesday. He was uninjured but needed to go to a backup car.

=== Qualifying - Thursday, August 16 ===
Rick Mears won the pole at a speed of 202.872 mph. It broke the track record he set in 1982. Bobby Rahal was second fastest at 201.496 mph. Mario Andretti qualified third at 200.294 mph.

Tony Bettenhausen Jr. was the slowest qualifier on Thursday with a speed of 172.364 mph, over 30 mph slower than Mears. On Friday morning, Bettenhausen crashed in practice.

=== Qualifying Day 2 - Friday, August 17 ===
Friday's final round of qualifying set the final three starting positions for the race. Pete Halsmer started 31st with a speed of 189.036 mph. Ed Pimm in a backup car qualified at 188.695. Dick Ferguson was the 33rd qualifier at 178.887 mph.

== Race ==
The race start was delayed two hours and eight minutes while the track was dried from a morning rain. Because of the freshly repaved frontstretch at Pocono, the race was able to start lined up in rows of three. Major bumps in the frontstretch had forced the race to start in rows of two in 1982 and 1983.

When the race began, Rick Mears drove off to a quick lead, a lead he held for 14 laps. Tom Sneva took the lead on lap 15. Roberto Guerrero crashed on lap 20. Under caution, Mears cycled back to the lead.

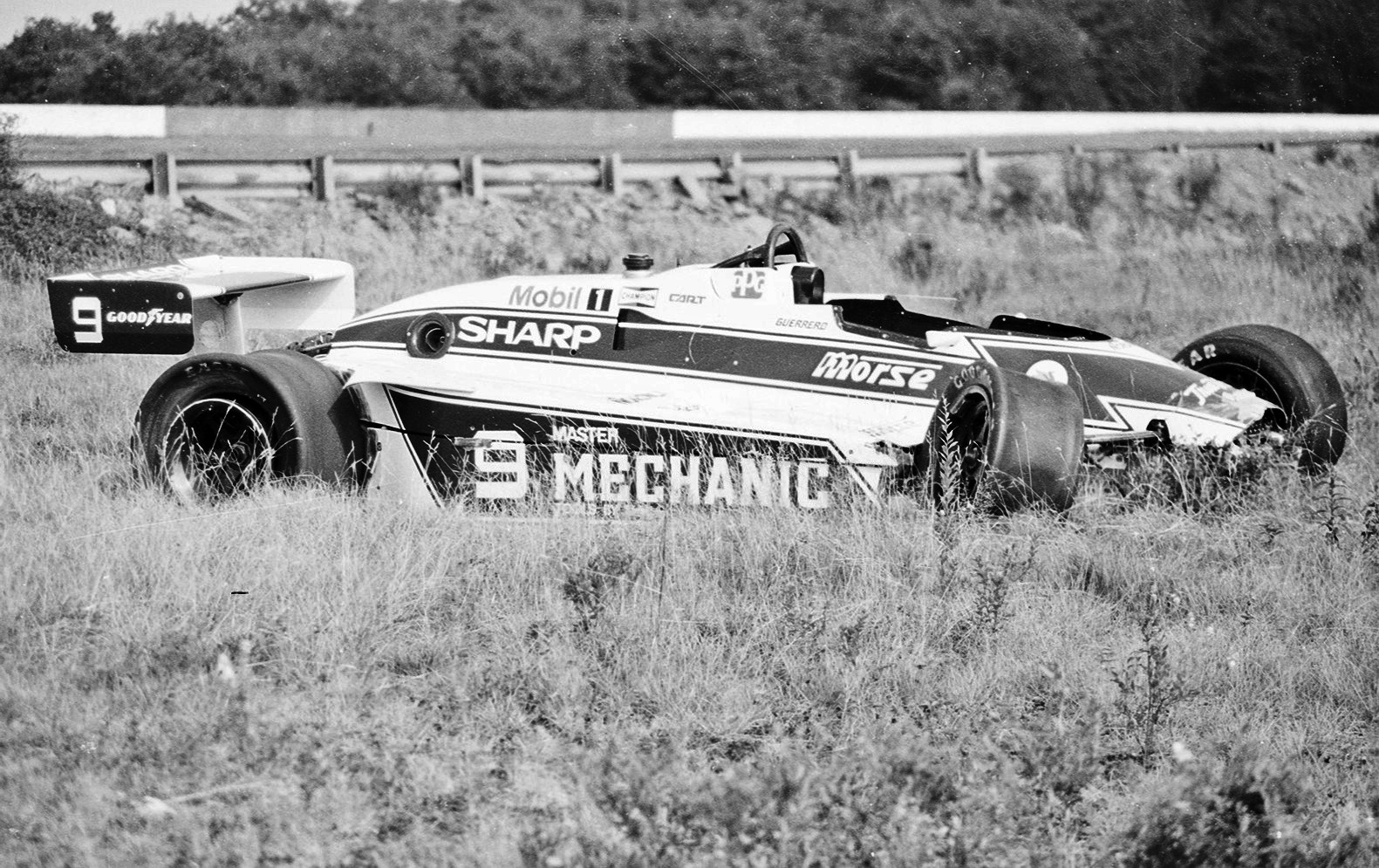
Roberto Guerrero's Wrecked Car

Mario Andretti was running third when the caution flew. At this point, the engine began running on seven cylinders. When he came into the pits, his crew took off the engine cover and replaced a spark plug. A handful of laps later, his crew replaced the spark box.

Danny Sullivan took the lead on lap 44 and led for 15 laps. Sneva returned to the lead on lap 60 and led 34 of the next 43 laps.

Dennis Firestone crashed on lap 93. During the caution, the CART pace car, driven by Roger Mears, experienced engine problems and was switched to a backup car.

Bobby Rahal took the lead on lap 139, and held the lead for the next 44 laps. Mario Andretti suffered an engine failure on lap 163. Al Unser Jr. crashed in turn one on lap 166.

The race saw a record 10 cautions. Bobby Rahal led the field to the final restart on lap 182. One lap after the restart, Rick Mears retook the lead and pulled away by over two seconds.

With 12 laps to go, the low fuel light on Mears' dashboard came on. The Penske driver was forced to run at a lower fuel number to conserve enough to finish. With six laps remaining, Rahal and Sullivan passed Mears for the lead on the frontstretch. Then going into turn two, Sullivan passed Rahal for the lead. Once Mears had saved enough fuel, he returned to full engine boost, but after re-passing Rahal, was almost two seconds behind Sullivan.

As Sullivan entered the last lap, he caught a pack of four lapped cars who spread out four-wide down the frontstretch, creating a blockade impassable to Sullivan. Entering turn three, Mears reached Sullivan's rear wing, but couldn't complete the pass. Sullivan won by 0.27 seconds, the closest finish in Pocono 500 history. Sullivan's win marked two consecutive years where a driver won in their first start at the track, joining Teo Fabi in 1983. It was Sullivan's second CART win and first on an oval.

For the second straight year, Mears won the Triple Crown points championship and the $10,000 prize that came with it.

== Box score ==
Finish	Grid	No	Name	Entrant	Chassis	Engine	Laps	Time/Status	Led	Points
1	9	30	(United States) Danny Sullivan	Doug Shierson Racing	Lola T800	Cosworth	200	3:38:29.690	22	20
2	1	6	(United States) Rick Mears	Penske Racing	March 84C	Cosworth	200	+0.270	74	18
3	2	5	(United States) Bobby Rahal	Truesports	March 84C	Cosworth	200	Running	45	14
4	4	4	(United States) Tom Sneva	Mayer Motor Racing	March 84C	Cosworth	200	Running	51	12
5	8	25	(United States) Danny Ongais	Interscope Racing	March 84C	Cosworth	199	+1 Lap	0	10
6	5	37	(United States) Scott Brayton	Brayton Racing	March 84C	Cosworth	199	+1 Lap	0	8
7	19	77	(United States) Pancho Carter	Galles Racing	March 84C	Cosworth	199	+1 Lap	0	6
8	11	1	(United States) Al Unser	Penske Racing	March 84C	Cosworth	199	+1 Lap	3	5
9	10	41	(United States) Howdy Holmes	Mayer Motor Racing	March 84C	Cosworth	194	+6 Laps	0	4
10	20	82	(United States) Gary Bettenhausen	H&R Racing	March 84C	Cosworth	192	+8 Laps	0	3
11	7	20	(United States) Gordon Johncock	Patrick Racing	March 84C	Cosworth	192	+8 Laps	0	2
12	16	22	(United States) Dick Simon	Dick Simon Racing	March 84C	Cosworth	191	+9 Laps	0	1
13	13	98	(United States) Ed Pimm	Curb Racing	Eagle 84	Pontiac	188	+12 Laps	0	0
14	18	18	(Australia) Geoff Brabham	Kraco Racing	March 84C	Cosworth	188	+12 Laps	0	0
15	24	38	(United States) Chet Fillip	Racing Team VDS	Penske PC-10	Cosworth	187	+13 Laps	0	0
16	29	16	(United States) Tony Bettenhausen Jr.	Bettenhausen Motorsports	March 84C	Cosworth	187	+13 Laps	0	0
17	33	72	(United States) John Paul Jr.	Primus Racing	Primus 84	Cosworth	184	+16 Laps	0	0
18	30	11	(United States) Pete Halsmer	Arciero Racing	March 84C	Cosworth	169	Lost wheel	0	0
19	3	3	(United States) Mario Andretti	Newman/Haas Racing	Lola T800	Cosworth	163	Engine	0	0
20	28	64	(United States) John Morton	Jet Engineering	March 83C	Chevrolet	156	Engine	0	0
21	13	7	(United States) Al Unser Jr.	Galles Racing	March 84C	Cosworth	153	Crash	5	0
22	27	56	(United States) Steve Chassey	Gohr Racing	March 83C	Chevrolet	131	Transmission	0	0
23	15	99	(United States) Michael Andretti	Kraco Racing	March 84C	Cosworth	125	Engine	0	0
24	26	27	(United States) Bill Alsup	Alsup Racing	Argo JM15B	Cosworth	116	Engine	0	0
25	21	55	(Mexico) Josele Garza	Machinists Union Racing	March 84C	Cosworth	97	Wheel bearing	0	0
26	22	36	(Australia) Dennis Firestone	BC Pace Racing	March 83C	Cosworth	83	Crash	0	0
27	17	14	(United States) A. J. Foyt	A. J. Foyt Enterprises	March 84C	Cosworth	79	Ignition	0	0
28	12	84	(United States) Johnny Rutherford	A. J. Foyt Enterprises	March 84C	Cosworth	75	Exhaust	0	0
29	14	21	(United States) Al Holbert	Alex Morales Motorsports	March 84C	Cosworth	49	Magneto	0	0
30	23	59	(United States) Jerry Karl	Machinists Union Racing	March 83C	Cosworth	38	Oil pressure	0	0
31	6	9	(Colombia) Roberto Guerrero	Bignotti-Cotter Racing	March 84C	Cosworth	19	Crash	0	0
32	25	24	(United States) Stan Fox	Pabst Racing	March 83C	Cosworth	13	Turbo fire	0	0
33	32	31	(United States) Dick Ferguson	Hess Racing	Eagle 83	Cosworth	13	Engine	0	0

=== Failed to qualify ===
- (United States) Kevin Cogan (33) – withdrawn, injured in practice crash

=== Race statistics ===
Lap Leaders
Laps	Leader
1–14	Rick Mears
15–20	Tom Sneva
21	Bobby Rahal
22–32	Rick Mears
33–43	Tom Sneva
44–59	Danny Sullivan
60–78	Tom Sneva
79–84	Rick Mears
85–88	Tom Sneva
89	Al Unser
90–92	Al Unser Jr.
93–103	Tom Sneva
104–105	Al Unser
106–107	Al Unser Jr.
108–138	Rick Mears
139–182	Bobby Rahal
183–194	Rick Mears
195–200	Danny Sullivan

== Broadcasting ==
The Pocono 500 was broadcast by NBC's Sportsworld. Paul Page was the lead broadcaster, joined by Bobby Unser. Bruce Jenner and Gary Gerould reported from the pits. A one-hour delayed broadcast was aired two weeks after the race on August 27.

Chip Ganassi served as a color commentator for the CART Radio Network broadcast. Ganassi suffered severe head injuries in a crash at Michigan four weeks earlier.
