= 1984 Michigan 500 =

Coordinates: 42°03′58.68″N 84°14′29.18″W

(United States) 1984 Michigan 500
Race details
- Race 8 of 16 in the 1984 CART season
- Date: July 22, 1984
- Official name: 1984 Michigan 500
- Location: Michigan International Speedway, Brooklyn, Michigan, United States
- Course: Permanent racing facility 2.000 mi / 3.219 km
- Distance: 250 laps 500.000 mi / 804.672 km
- Weather: Cloudy with temperatures up to 89 °F (32 °C); wind speeds reaching up to 8 miles per hour (13 km/h)

Pole position
- Driver: (United States) Mario Andretti (Newman-Haas Racing)
- Time: 211.088 mph (339.713 km/h)

Podium
- First: (United States) Mario Andretti (Newman-Haas Racing)
- Second: (United States) Tom Sneva (Mayer Motor Racing)
- Third: (United States) Rick Mears (Team Penske)

The 1984 Michigan 500, the fourth running of the event, was held at the Michigan International Speedway in Brooklyn, Michigan, on Sunday, July 22, 1984. The event was race number 8 of 16 in the 1984 CART PPG Indy Car World Series. The race was won by Mario Andretti, his first Michigan 500 victory.

== Background ==
After three years, the Michigan 500 had grown to establish itself as the second most significant race on the Indy car schedule, behind the Indianapolis 500. While the United States Auto Club sanctioned the Indy 500, the Michigan 500 was under the control of CART who treated it as their showcase race. By 1984, it had also gained a reputation of being bedeviled in the eyes of the media and fans. After much anticipation, the 1981 Michigan 500 was delayed a week by rain. The 1983 Michigan 500 was delayed two hours by thunderstorms and nearby tornadoes that caused a fatal heart attack for a 64-year-old female spectator and hospitalized eight fans when a canopy blew off the top of the grandstands. The races themselves featured many crashes that hospitalized many drivers.

As was the case in 1983, Domino's Pizza offered a one million dollar bonus to any driver who could win IndyCar's Triple Crown of 500 Mile Races: The Indianapolis 500, Michigan 500, and Pocono 500. Rick Mears won the 1984 Indianapolis 500 and entered Michigan still eligible to win the million dollars.

== Practice and Time Trials ==
Cool weather on Wednesday, July 18, opening day of practice saw fast speeds. Tom Sneva led the way with a lap of 209.595 mph. It was thought that Sneva's track record of 211.392 mph, set in 1978, could be in jeopardy during qualifying the following day. Bobby Rahal was second fastest at 207.930 mph. Mario Andretti was third fastest at 205.614 mph.

On Thursday, Mario Andretti won the pole with a speed of 211.088 mph. Tom Sneva was close behind at 211.051 mph. Bobby Rahal completed the front row with a speed of 208.714 mph. It was Andretti's fourth consecutive pole on the IndyCar schedule, his fifth of the year, and first on an oval.

Jacques Villenueve spun and hit the turn two wall on his qualifying run. Villenueve, who had missed the Indianapolis 500 after suffering a concussion in a practice crash, suffered leg injuries in his Michigan crash. He was hospitalized with a broken left heel, three broken toes on his right foot, and a deep laceration on his right knee. The crash kept him from racing for over a month.

A. J. Foyt posted the 19th fastest speed in qualifying but was disqualified when inspector noticed his rear wing was set back half an inch too far from the rear axle on one side. Rules stated that Foyt could not requalify the car once it had been disqualified, but was allowed to accept a "promoter's option" and be added to the field in the 34th and last position.

Defending Michigan 500 winner, John Paul Jr. was unemployed following the closure of his team in May. Chris Kneifel qualified for the race in 28th position but was suffering from the flu. Kneifel's team offered his seat to Paul for the race. Team VDS, Paul's former team, still had Paul under contract despite not racing and wanted compensation before allowing him to drive for another team. Paul, who drove from his home in Florida to Michigan without stopping, fell asleep at the wheel and crashed his passenger car at 4 a.m. on Friday morning. "I ran off the road and was launched over a guardrail but fortunately the car landed on its wheels. I was pretty embarrassed."

Paul arrived at the track and took practice laps in Kneifel's car but the two teams were unable to come to an agreement on contract terms. On race morning, Kneifel decided he was too sick to race the car and the team withdrew from the event, bringing the starting field back to 33 cars.

== Race ==
An estimated 70,000 spectators were on hand for the race. General Manager of the Cadillac division for General Motors, John Grettenberger, gave the command to start engines.

Mario Andretti led the first five laps of the race but began slowing as the engine lost power in a cylinder. By lap 10, Andretti had fallen to 10th. Steve Chassey spun exiting turn two on lap 16 but was able to continue. During the first caution period of the day, Andretti's crew pulled the engine cover and replaced a spark plug. Andretti lost a lap but corrected the problem.

Phil Krueger spun in turn four to bring out the second caution on lap 39. Less than 40 laps later, Krueger again spun in turn four to bring out the third caution.

Chip Ganassi cut a left-front tire and brought out the fourth caution for debris. Ganassi had a brief fuel fire in the pits. Fueler Butch Meyer was hospitalized with second degree burns to his face and arm.

Two laps after the restart for Ganassi's tire, Phil Krueger crashed very hard in turn four. His car split in half and Krueger was knocked unconscious. Krueger was hospitalized with a concussion, broken right thumb, and possible internal injuries.

Tom Sneva asserted himself as the fastest car by leading 55 of the first 100 laps. Bobby Rahal also spent time in the lead.

A. J. Foyt climbed from the last starting spot to take the lead on lap 118. Foyt was recovering from recent back surgery and despite his strong run, looked like he would need a relief driver. Al Unser, who fell out of the race with engine failure, was summoned to Foyt's pit. Sponsorship problems allegedly prevented Unser from driving Foyt's car. After Danny Ongais fell out of the race, he was asked to relieve Foyt. Seemingly ready for relief, Foyt got out of the car, and changed his mind, returning to the cockpit. Foyt fell out of the race with suspension problems after 206 laps.

Shortly after a restart on lap 148, Al Unser Jr. and Chip Ganassi crashed violently at the exit of turn two. Both cars slid towards the inside retaining wall, impacted it, with Ganassi's car flipping several times. Ganassi was critically injured with a closed head injury. Unser was treated and released from a local hospital for bumps and bruises.

On lap 212, a serious crash occurred in turn four when Gary Bettenhausen spun in the middle of the race track. Howdy Holmes slowed his car but was unable to avoid Bettenhausen's. Holmes' car drove entirely underneath Bettenhausen's before the two cars became stuck together and slid into the outside wall. Behind them, Bobby Rahal and Al Holbert crashed into the outside wall in avoidance. All drivers were uninjured.

Mario Andretti retook the lead on lap 205 and extended his advantage as the race neared the conclusion. With less than 10 laps remaining, Tom Sneva slowly started to catch Andretti in what promised to be a thrilling finish. Several times, Sneva attempted to pass Andretti who took defensive lines. Entering turn one on the final lap, Sneva looked to the inside of Andretti who held him off. Andretti and Sneva raced to the finish line with Andretti winning the race by 0.014 seconds, at the time, the closest finish in Indy car history.

Fighting for third on the backstretch on the last lap, Pancho Carter pulled out of the draft of Rick Mears and lost control. The car spun into the outside guardrail and lost its bodywork. The chassis then slid into the infield grass where it overturned several times. Carter was uninjured.

After the race, Sneva was very outspoken in his belief that Andretti was overly aggressive in blocking him. "(Andretti) tried to kill us both the last four laps. He tried to run me in the infield once and then, after I gave him a head fake and went high, he almost stuffed me in the wall. He couldn't have missed hitting me by inches. It was bush league bullshit."

Andretti said, "We didn't come that close. I knew where he was and I didn't do anything to put him in jeopardy. I know I made my race car pretty wide by using up all the track. But I didn't do anything dangerous. Blocking is legal that close to the end. I did a few things to defend myself and I thought I did it quite nicely... He would have done exactly the same thing I did if he's the racer I know he is. He'll get over it by Wednesday."

Sneva's crew also contended that Andretti was not in the lead but rather at the tail end of the lead lap. Fourth-place finisher, Gordon Johncock's crew maintained that several cars illegally passed him under the final caution period and protested the finish of the race.

== Box score ==
Finish	Grid	No	Name	Entrant	Chassis	Engine	Laps	Time/Status	Led	Points
1	1	3	(United States) Mario Andretti	Newman/Haas Racing	Lola T800	Cosworth	250	3:44:45	51	21
2	2	4	(United States) Tom Sneva	Mayer Motor Racing	March 84C	Cosworth	250	+0.140	82	17
3	4	6	(United States) Rick Mears	Penske Racing	March 84C	Cosworth	250	Running	1	14
4	7	20	(United States) Gordon Johncock	Patrick Racing	March 84C	Cosworth	250	Running	1	12
5	9	9	(Colombia) Roberto Guerrero	Bignotti-Cotter Racing	March 84C	Cosworth	250	Running	2	10
6	8	77	(United States) Pancho Carter	Galles Racing	March 84C	Cosworth	249	Crash	0	8
7	10	84	(United States) Johnny Rutherford	A. J. Foyt Enterprises	March 84C	Cosworth	249	+1 Lap	0	6
8	5	33	(United States) Kevin Cogan	Forsythe Racing	March 84C	Cosworth	249	+1 Lap	6	5
9	19	18	(Australia) Geoff Brabham	Kraco Racing	March 84C	Cosworth	248	+2 Laps	0	4
10	17	30	(United States) Danny Sullivan	Doug Shierson Racing	Lola T800	Cosworth	248	+2 Laps	0	3
11	18	55	(Mexico) Josele Garza	Machinists Union Racing	March 84C	Cosworth	244	+6 Laps	14	2
12	30	22	(United States) Dick Simon	Dick Simon Racing	March 84C	Cosworth	241	+9 Laps	0	1
13	12	37	(United States) Scott Brayton	Brayton Racing	March 84C	Cosworth	241	+9 Laps	0	0
14	32	98	(United States) Pete Halsmer	Curb Racing	Eagle 84	Pontiac	241	+9 Laps	0	0
15	24	16	(United States) Tony Bettenhausen Jr.	Bettenhausen Motorsports	March 84C	Cosworth	235	+15 Laps	0	0
16	28	27	(United States) Bill Alsup	Alsup Racing	Argo JM15B	Cosworth	216	Oil pressure	0	0
17	20	17	(Republic of Ireland) Derek Daly	Bettenhausen Motorsports	March 84C	Cosworth	214	+36 Laps	0	0
18	3	5	(United States) Bobby Rahal	Truesports	March 84C	Cosworth	211	Crash	75	0
19	13	21	(United States) Al Holbert	Alex Morales Motorsports	March 84C	Cosworth	208	Crash	0	0
20	11	99	(United States) Michael Andretti	Kraco Racing	March 84C	Cosworth	207	Engine	0	0
21	6	41	(United States) Howdy Holmes	Mayer Motor Racing	March 84C	Cosworth	207	Crash	0	0
22	33	14	(United States) A. J. Foyt	A. J. Foyt Enterprises	March 84C	Cosworth	206	Suspension	15	0
23	21	82	(United States) Gary Bettenhausen	H&R Racing	March 84C	Cosworth	201	Crash	0	0
24	29	25	(United States) Danny Ongais	Interscope Racing	March 84C	Cosworth	187	Engine	0	0
25	31	57	(United States) Spike Gehlhausen	Indy Auto Racing	March 83C	Cosworth	159	Engine	0	0
26	14	7	(United States) Al Unser Jr.	Galles Racing	March 84C	Cosworth	147	Crash	2	0
27	16	40	(United States) Chip Ganassi	Patrick Racing	March 84C	Cosworth	140	Crash	0	0
28	27	24	(United States) Stan Fox	Pabst Racing	March 83C	Cosworth	111	Oil pressure	0	0
29	22	58	(United States) Phil Krueger	Phil Krueger	March 83C	Cosworth	88	Crash	0	0
30	15	1	(United States) Al Unser	Penske Racing	March 84C	Cosworth	76	Overheating	1	0
31	25	38	(United States) Chet Fillip	Racing Team VDS	Penske PC-10	Cosworth	51	Crash	0	0
32	23	56	(United States) Steve Chassey	Gohr Racing	March 83C	Chevrolet	24	Overheating	0	0
33	26	64	(United States) Ed Pimm	Jet Engineering	March 83C	Chevrolet	22	Pit fire	0	0

=== Failed to qualify ===
- (United States) Dick Ferguson (#31)
- (Australia) Dennis Firestone (#36)
- (United States) Dale Coyne (#45)
- (United States) John Paul Jr. (#72)
- (Canada) Jacques Villeneuve (#76)

=== Race statistics ===
Lap Leaders
Laps	Leader
1–5	Mario Andretti
6–11	Kevin Cogan
12–17	Bobby Rahal
18–31	Josele Garza
32–39	Tom Sneva
40	Bobby Rahal
41	Al Unser
42–88	Tom Sneva
89–116	Bobby Rahal
117	Gordon Johncock
118–132	A. J. Foyt
133	Tom Sneva
134	Al Unser Jr.
135	Tom Sneva
136	Al Unser Jr.
137–160	Tom Sneva
161–187	Bobby Rahal
188–189	Roberto Guerrero
190	Rick Mears
191–203	Bobby Rahal
204	Tom Sneva
205–250	Mario Andretti

Cautions: 12 for 104 laps
Laps	Reason
17–22	Steve Chassey spin backstraight
39–44	Phil Krueger spin turn 4
77–84	Phil Krueger spin turn 4
89–93	Chip Ganassi cut tire turn 1
96–108	Phil Krueger crash turn 4
117–124	Chet Fillip crash turn 3
127–133	Michael Andretti slow on track
139–145	Debris turn 3
148–171	Al Unser Jr. and Chip Ganassi crash backstraight
199–204	Roberto Guerrero off track
212–224	Bobby Rahal, Al Holbert, Howdy Holmes, and Gary Bettenhausen crash turn 4
250	Pancho Carter crash backstraight

== Broadcasting ==
The Michigan 500 was broadcast live on television by NBC. Paul Page was the lead announcer and was joined by Bobby Unser as color commentator. Gary Gerould and Bruce Jenner served as pit reporters.

Previous race: 1984 Budweiser Cleveland Grand Prix	CART PPG Indy Car World Series; 1984 season	Next race: 1984 Provimi Veal 200
Previous race: 1983 Michigan 500	Michigan 500	Next race: 1985 Michigan 500
