= 1983–84 USAC Championship Car season =

Sports season

- USAC Gold Crown Championship
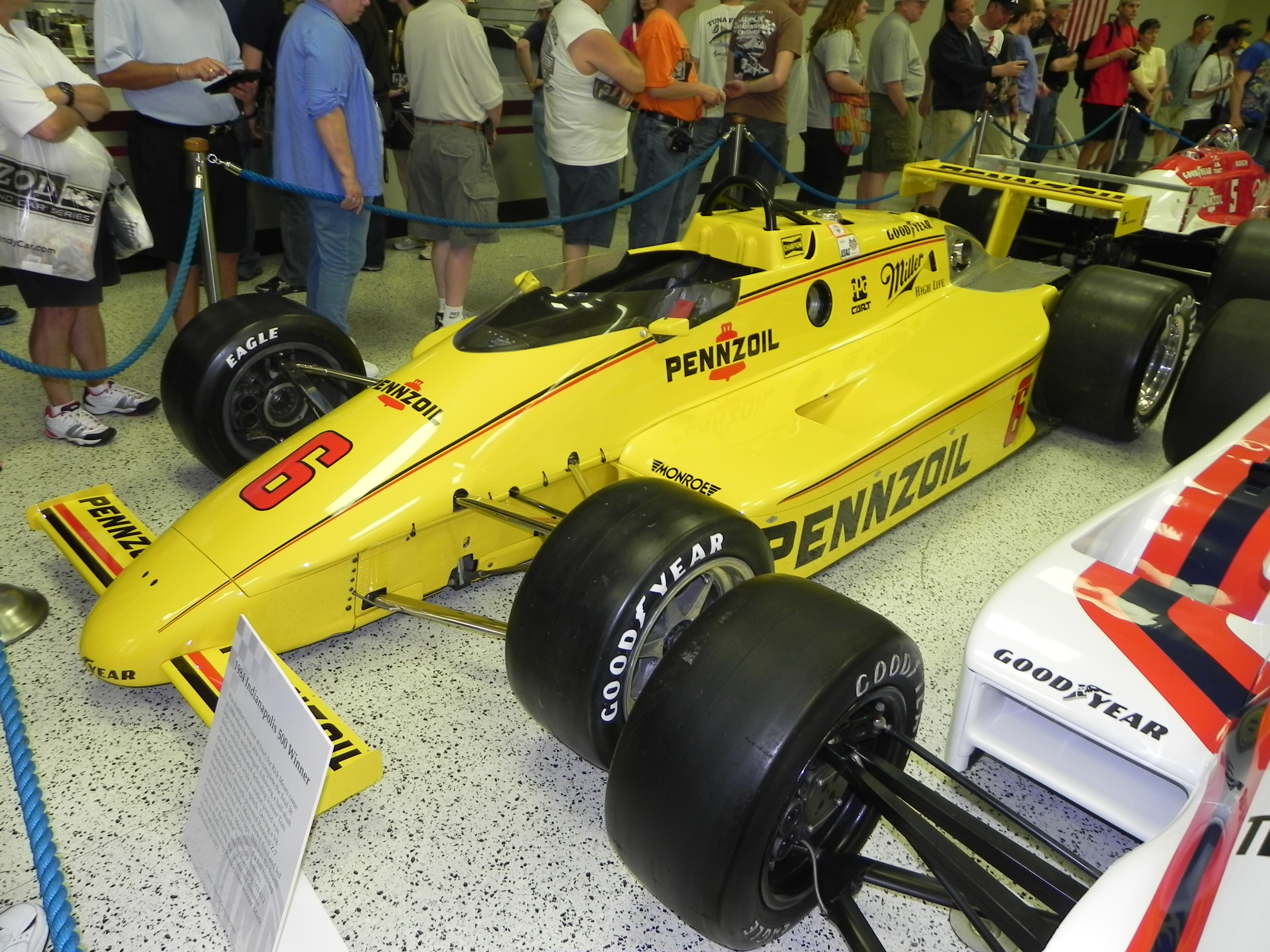

Season
- Races: 2
- Start date: September 5, 1983
- End date: May 27, 1984

Awards
- National champion: (United States) Rick Mears
- Indianapolis 500 winner: (United States) Rick Mears

The 1983–84 USAC Championship Car season consisted of two races, beginning in Du Quoin, Illinois, on September 5, 1983, and concluding in Speedway, Indiana, on May 27, 1984. The USAC National Champion and Indianapolis 500 winner was Rick Mears. This was the last year that the Championship comprised more than one race, and the Ted Horn Memorial was the last ever Indycar race on a dirt or clay surface.

By this time, the preeminent national championship season was instead sanctioned by CART.

== Schedule and results ==
All races were run on Oval/Speedway courses.

| Rnd | Date | Race name | Length | Track | Location | Type | Pole position | Winning driver |
|---|---|---|---|---|---|---|---|---|
| 1 | September 5, 1983 | (United States) Ted Horn Memorial | 100 mi (160 km) | DuQuoin State Fairgrounds | Du Quoin, Illinois | Dirt | (United States) Gary Bettenhausen | (United States) Gary Bettenhausen |
| 2 | May 27, 1984 | (United States) Indianapolis 500-Mile Race | 500 mi (800 km) | Indianapolis Motor Speedway | Speedway, Indiana | Paved | (United States) Tom Sneva | (United States) Rick Mears |

== Final points standings ==
Note: Drivers not entered for the Indianapolis 500 were not eligible for points.

| Pos | Driver | DQSF (United States) | INDY (United States) | Pts |
|---|---|---|---|---|
| 1 | (United States) Rick Mears | | 1* | 1000 |
| 2 | (Colombia) Roberto Guerrero | | 2 | 800 |
| 3 | (United States) Al Unser | | 3 | 700 |
| 4 | (United States) Al Holbert | | 4 | 600 |
| 5 | (United States) Michael Andretti | | 5 | 500 |
| 6 | (United States) Gary Bettenhausen | **1*** | DNQ | 400 |
| 7 | (United States) A. J. Foyt | | 6 | 400 |
| 8 | (United States) George Snider | 4 | 11 | 340 |
| 9 | (United States) Bobby Rahal | | 7 | 300 |
| 10 | (United States) Ken Schrader | 3 | DNP | 280 |
| 11 | (United States) Herm Johnson | | 8 | 250 |
| 12 | (United States) Danny Ongais | | 9 | 200 |
| 13 | (Mexico) Josele Garza | | 10 | 150 |
| 14 | (United States) Larry Rice | 8 | | 100 |
| 15 | (Australia) Dennis Firestone | | 12 | 50 |
| 16 | (United States) Rich Vogler | 11 | DNP | 40 |
| 17 | (United States) Chris Kneifel | | 15 | 25 |
| 18 | (United States) Tom Sneva | | **16** | 25 |
| 19 | (United States) Bill Vukovich II | 12 | DNP | 20 |
| 20 | (United States) Mario Andretti | | 17 | 20 |
| 21 | (United States) Scott Brayton | | 18 | 20 |
| 22 | (United States) Pancho Carter | | 19 | 20 |
| 23 | (United States) Kevin Cogan | | 20 | 20 |
| 24 | (United States) Al Unser Jr. | | 21 | 15 |
| 25 | (United States) Johnny Rutherford | | 22 | 15 |
| 26 | (United States) Dick Simon | | 23 | 15 |
| 27 | (Italy) Teo Fabi | | 24 | 15 |
| 28 | (United States) Sheldon Kinser | 16 | | 10 |
| 29 | (United States) Gordon Johncock | | 25 | 10 |
| 30 | (United States) Tony Bettenhausen Jr. | | 26 | 10 |
| 31 | (Republic of Ireland) Derek Daly | | 27 | 10 |
| 32 | (United States) Chip Ganassi | | 28 | 10 |
| 33 | (United States) Tom Bigelow | 17 | DNQ | 8 |
| 34 | (United States) Steve Chassey | 23 | DNQ | 6 |
| 35 | (United States) Danny Sullivan | | 29 | 5 |
| 36 | (United States) Spike Gehlhausen | | 31 | 5 |
| 37 | (Brazil) Emerson Fittipaldi | | 32 | 5 |
| 38 | (Australia) Geoff Brabham | | 33 | 5 |
| 39 | (United States) Mark Alderson | 26 | DNP | 4 |
| - | (United States) Howdy Holmes | | 13 | 0 |
| - | (United States) Tom Gloy | | 14 | 0 |
| - | (United States) Patrick Bedard | | 30 | 0 |
| - | (United States) Chuck Gurney | 2 | | 0 |
| - | (United States) Bill Engelhart | 5 | | 0 |
| - | (United States) Steve Kinser | 6 | | 0 |
| - | (United States) Ron Shuman | 7 | | 0 |
| - | (United States) Ron Burke | 9 | | 0 |
| - | (United States) Gary Hieber | 10 | | 0 |
| - | (United States) Jerry Nemire | 13 | | 0 |
| - | (United States) Bud Wilmot | 14 | | 0 |
| - | (United States) Steve Siegel | 15 | | 0 |
| - | (United States) Mike Winblad | 18 | | 0 |
| - | (United States) Jack Hewitt | 19 | | 0 |
| - | (United States) Mike Johnson | 20 | | 0 |
| - | (United States) Larry Dickson | 21 | | 0 |
| - | (United States) Larry Martin | 22 | | 0 |
| - | (United States) Bobby Olivero | 24 | | 0 |
| - | (United States) Randy Bateman | 25 | | 0 |
| - | (United States) Joe Saldana | 27 | | 0 |
| - | (United States) Bob Cicconi | 28 | | 0 |
| - | (United States) Jim McElreath | 29 | | 0 |
| - | (United States) Rick Hood | 30 | | 0 |
| - | (United States) Bill Alsup | | DNQ | 0 |
| - | (United States) Chuck Ciprich | | DNQ | 0 |
| - | (United Kingdom) Jim Crawford | | DNQ | 0 |
| - | (United States) Larry Cannon | | DNQ | 0 |
| - | (United States) Mike Chandler | | DNQ | 0 |
| - | (United States) Phil Caliva | | DNQ | 0 |
| - | (United States) Chet Fillip | | DNQ | 0 |
| - | (United States) Dick Ferguson | | DNQ | 0 |
| - | (United States) Stan Fox | | DNQ | 0 |
| - | (Italy) Bruno Giacomelli | | DNQ | 0 |
| - | (United States) Pete Halsmer | | DNQ | 0 |
| - | (United States) Jerry Karl | | DNQ | 0 |
| - | (United States) Phil Krueger | | DNQ | 0 |
| - | (United States) Steve Krisiloff | | DNQ | 0 |
| - | (United States) Al Loquasto | | DNQ | 0 |
| - | (United States) Roger Mears | | DNQ | 0 |
| - | (Canada) Jacques Villeneuve Sr. | | Wth | 0 |
| - | (United States) Ed Primm | | DNQ | 0 |
| - | (United States) John Paul Jr. | | DNQ | 0 |
| - | (United States) Johnny Parsons | DNQ | DNQ | 0 |
| - | (South Africa) Desiré Wilson | | DNQ | 0 |
| - | (United States) Jerry Sneva | | DNQ | 0 |
| - | (United States) Terry Uehling | DNQ | | 0 |
| - | (United States) Steve Cannon | DNQ | | 0 |
| - | (United States) Gary Irvin | DNQ | | 0 |
| - | (United States) Terry Kawell | DNQ | | 0 |
| - | (United States) Larry Gates | DNQ | | 0 |
| - | (United States) Randy Kinser | DNQ | | 0 |
| - | (United States) Kevin Olson | DNQ | | 0 |
| - | (United States) Manny Rockhold | DNQ | | 0 |
| - | (United States) Ron Hughes Jr. | DNQ | | 0 |
| - | (United States) Eddie Leavitt | DNQ | | 0 |
| - | (United States) Steve Long | DNQ | | 0 |
| - | (United States) Chuck Jones | DNQ | | 0 |
| - | (United States) Jerry Weeks | DNQ | | 0 |
| - | (United States) Ron Milton | DNQ | | 0 |
| - | (United States) Jim Moughan Jr. | DNQ | | 0 |
| - | (United States) Rip Williams | DNQ | | 0 |
| - | (United States) Steve Ball | DNQ | | 0 |
| - | (United Kingdom) Kenny Acheson | | DNP | 0 |
| - | (United States) Price Cobb | | DNP | 0 |
| - | (United States) John Morton | | DNP | 0 |
| - | (United States) Jim Hillyer | | DNP | 0 |
| - | (United States) Steve Hostetler | | DNP | 0 |
| - | (United States) Bill Puterbaugh | | DNP | 0 |
| - | (Peru) Jorge Koechlin | | DNP | 0 |
| - | (Netherlands) Arie Luyendyk | | DNP | 0 |
| - | (United States) Willy T. Ribbs | | DNP | 0 |
| - | (United States) Randy Lewis | | DNP | 0 |
| - | (United States) Paul Rochelle | | DNP | 0 |

| Color | Result |
|---|---|
| Gold | Winner |
| Silver | 2nd place |
| Bronze | 3rd place |
| Green | 4th & 5th place |
| Light Blue | 6th-10th place |
| Dark Blue | Finished (Outside Top 10) |
| Purple | Did not finish (Ret) |
| Red | Did not qualify (DNQ) |
| Brown | Withdrawn (Wth) |
| Black | Disqualified (DSQ) |
| White | Did not start (DNS) |
| Blank | Did not participate (DNP) |
| Blank | Not competing |

**In-line notation**
| **Bold** | Pole position |
| Italics | Ran fastest race lap |
| * | Led most race laps |
Rookie of the Year
Rookie

== See also ==
- 1983 Indianapolis 500
- 1983 CART PPG Indy Car World Series
- 1984 CART PPG Indy Car World Series
