= 1984 Champ Car season =

The 1984 Champ Car season may refer to:

- the 1983–84 USAC Championship Car season, which included one race in 1984, the 68th Indianapolis 500
- the 1984 CART PPG Indy Car World Series, sanctioned by CART, who would later become Champ Car
