= 1984 Indianapolis 500 =

American motor race

68th Indianapolis 500
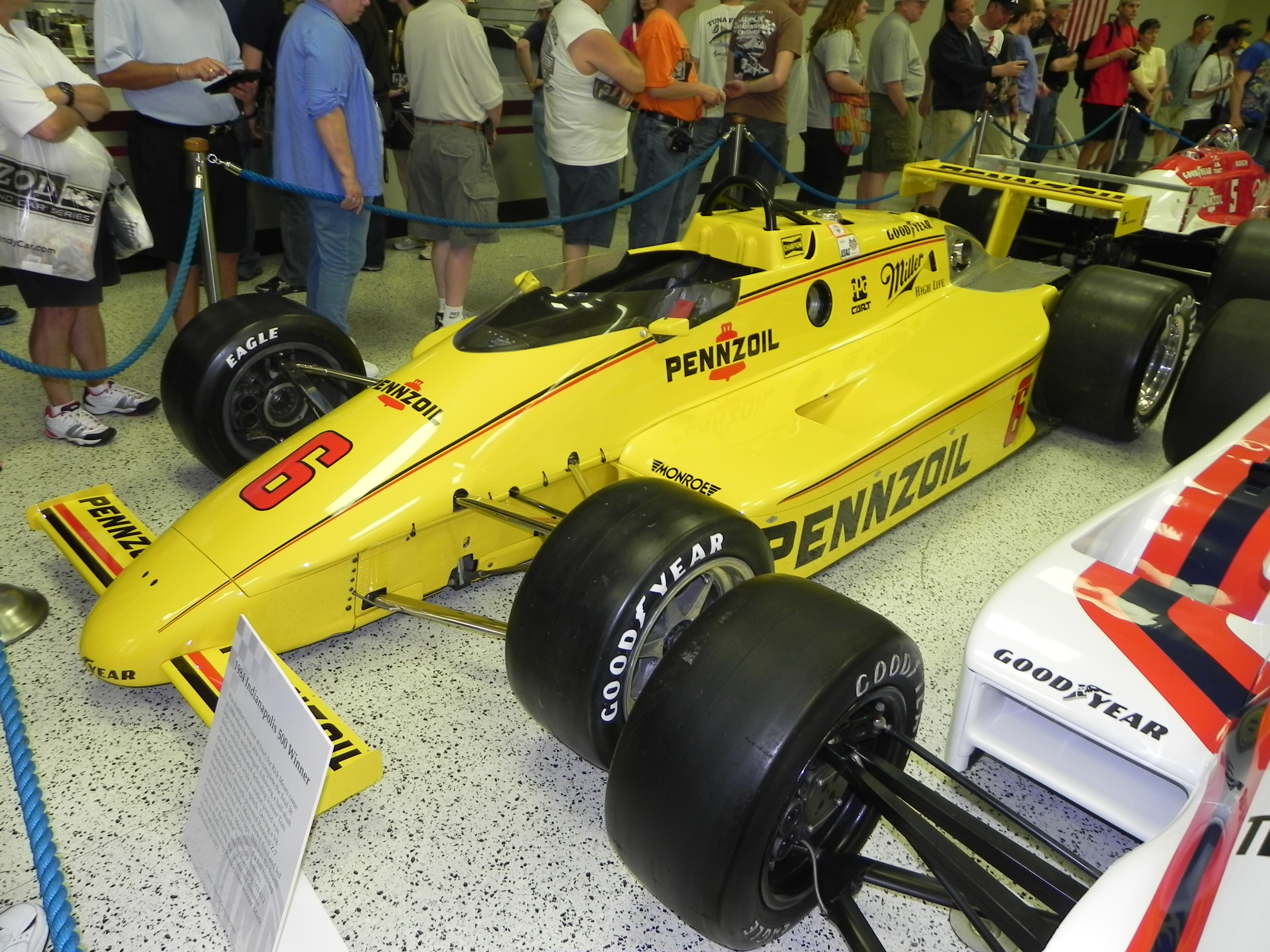

Indianapolis Motor Speedway

Indianapolis 500
- Sanctioning body: USAC
- Season: 1984 CART season 1983-84 Gold Crown
- Date: May 27, 1984
- Winner: (United States) Rick Mears
- Winning team: Penske Racing
- Winning Chief Mechanic: Peter Parrott
- Time of race: 3:03:21.660
- Average speed: 163.612 mph (263.308 km/h)
- Pole position: (United States) Tom Sneva
- Pole speed: 210.029 mph (338.009 km/h)
- Fastest qualifier: (United States) Tom Sneva
- Rookie of the Year: (Colombia) Roberto Guerrero & (United States) Michael Andretti
- Most laps led: (United States) Rick Mears (119)

Pre-race ceremonies
- National anthem: Purdue Band
- "Back Home Again in Indiana": Jim Nabors
- Starting command: Mary F. Hulman
- Pace car: Pontiac Fiero
- Pace car driver: John Callies (Pontiac)
- Starter: Duane Sweeney
- Estimated attendance: 400,000

Television in the United States
- Network: ABC
- Announcers: Host: Jackie Stewart; Lap-by-lap: Jim McKay; Color Analyst: Sam Posey
- Nielsen ratings: 12.9 / 25

Chronology
Previous	Next
1983	1985

The 68th Indianapolis 500 was held at the Indianapolis Motor Speedway in Speedway, Indiana on Sunday May 27, 1984. Rick Mears, who previously won in 1979, won his second (of four) Indy 500 victories driving for Penske. Contenders Tom Sneva and Mario Andretti dropped out of the race in the second half. Sneva broke a CV joint, and Andretti tangled with another car during a pit stop, damaging his nosecone. That left Mears alone two laps ahead of the field, and he cruised to the victory. Mears set a new speed record for 500 miles (163.612 mph), breaking Mark Donohue's 1972 record. It is also tied for the largest margin of victory (two laps) since the "pack-up" rule was adopted in 1979. Three months after the race, Mears would suffer severe leg injuries in a practice crash at Sanair.

Three rookies finished in the top five: Roberto Guerrero (2nd), Al Holbert (4th), and Michael Andretti (5th). Guerrero and Andretti shared the rookie of the year award. The race is well-remembered for the terrible crash of sportswriter-turned-racer Pat Bedard, who tumbled through the infield in turn 4 on lap 58. Another rookie, two-time World Champion and future two-time Indy winner Emerson Fittipaldi made a quiet debut.

The race was sanctioned by USAC, and was included as part of the 1984 CART PPG Indy Car World Series. The 1984 race has the distinction of having the record for most entries (117), and the most cars to actually be seen in the garage (87). Defending race winner Tom Sneva, who broke the 200 mph barrier during time trials in 1977, headlined qualifying on pole day. Sneva made history once again, as he became the first driver to break the 210 mph barrier, en route to his third pole position. This Indy 500 was the last for 33 years that an active Formula One driver (in this case Teo Fabi), qualified for the field. Two-time World Champion Fernando Alonso would be the next, making his "500" debut in 2017.

== Race schedule ==
Race schedule — April/May 1984
Sun	Mon	Tue	Wed	Thu	Fri	Sat
22	23	24	25	26	27; ROP	28; ROP
29; ROP	30	1	2	3	4	5 Practice
6 Practice	7 Practice	8 Practice	9 Practice	10; Practice	11; Practice	12; Pole Day
13; Time Trials	14; Practice	15; Practice	16; Practice	17; Practice	18; Practice	19; Time Trials
20; Bump Day	21	22	23	24; Carb Day	25; Mini-Marathon	26; Parade
27; Indy 500	28; Memorial Day	29	30	31		

Color	Notes
Green	Practice
Dark Blue	Time trials
Silver	Race day
Red	Rained out*
Blank	No track activity

* Includes days where track
activity was significantly
limited due to rain

ROP — denotes Rookie
Orientation Program

== Time trials ==
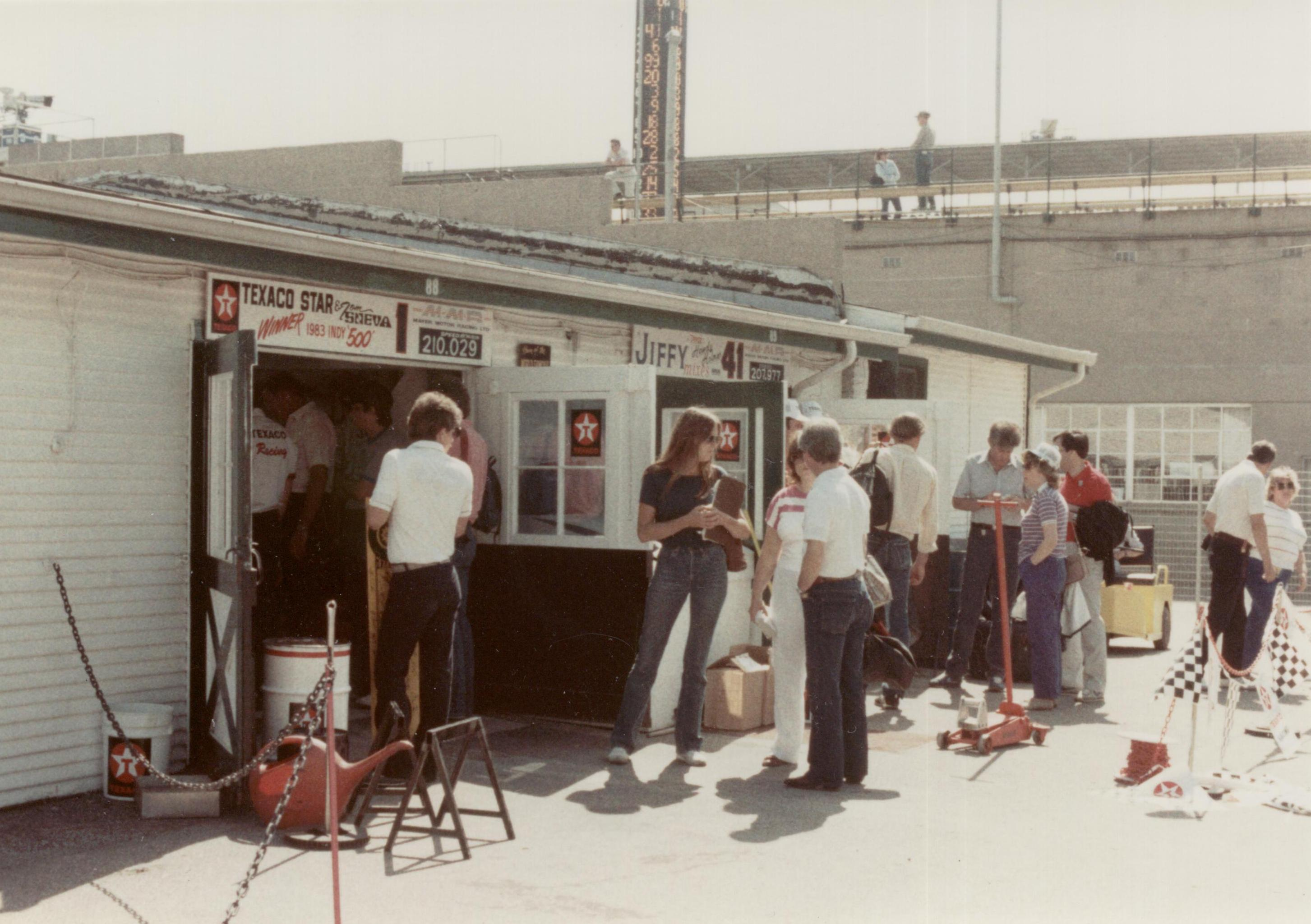
Tom Sneva's garage in Gasoline Alley.

During the offseason, defending "500" winner Tom Sneva notably parted ways with Bignotti-Cotter Racing after a dispute with the team. Sneva and sponsor Texaco eventually landed at Mayer Motor Racing, a new Indy car team formed by former McLaren colleagues Teddy Mayer and Tyler Alexander.

On May 11, Mario Andretti turned a lap of 212.414 mph during practice, the fastest lap ever run at the Speedway. Andretti established himself as a favorite for the pole. Gordon Johncock practiced at over 211 mph, and Tom Sneva was over 208 mph.

=== Pole Day – Saturday May 12 ===
Pole Day was a historic day as Tom Sneva broke the track record with the first lap official over 210 mph at Indianapolis. Sneva was also the first driver to break the 200 mph barrier, which he accomplished during time trials in 1977.

Rick Mears was the first driver in the field, completing his run with an early track record of 207.847 mph. Rookie Michael Andretti was the next car out (207.805 mph), running surprisingly close to Mears. At 12:45 pm, Mario Andretti took to the track with high expectations. His first lap was completed at 209.687 mph, a new one-lap track record. His second and third laps dropped off, however. As he came out of turn four on the fourth and final lap, the car's engine quit. Andretti coasted across the finish line powerless to complete the run. The average speed sank to 207.467 mph. It would be good enough for row 2, but a disappointment compared to his practice speeds earlier in the week.

Shortly before 2 p.m., Tom Sneva took to the track, and electrified the crowd. His third lap was run at 210.423 mph, a new track record, and the first qualifying lap ever at Indy over 210 mph. His fourth lap was the fastest. His four-lap average speed of 210.029 mph was also a new record, and secured him the pole position. It was Sneva's third Indy pole, and fourth time as the overall fastest qualifier.

- Lap 1 – 43.039 seconds, 209.113 mph
- Lap 2 – 42.878 seconds, 209.898 mph (new 1-lap track record)
- Lap 3 – 42.771 seconds, 210.423 mph (new 1-lap track record)
- Lap 4 – 42.717 seconds, 210.689 mph (new 1-lap track record)
- Total – 2:51.405, 210.029 mph (new 4-lap track record)

Later in the day, Howdy Holmes, the teammate of Sneva, squeezed onto the front row with a run of 207.977 mph. It put him in second starting position, and bumped Rick Mears to the outside of the front row. Rookie Michael Andretti out-qualified his father, and would line up in 4th position (Mario qualified 6th). A total of 28 cars qualified on pole day.

=== Second Day – Sunday May 13 ===
Rain kept the track closed until nearly 1 p.m. Only three cars made attempts all afternoon, but none of them were run to completion. Johnny Rutherford went out for his second attempt in a Foyt entry, but never completed a lap due to mechanical problems.

During a practice run, John Paul Jr. wrecked in turn four, suffering leg injuries.

=== Third Day – Saturday May 19 ===
The third day of time trials began with five spots remaining unfilled on the grid. Rain was in the forecast for Sunday, so several teams scrambled to get their cars prepared to qualify on Saturday. Bill Alsup was the first driver to make an attempt, but his crew waved off the run.

George Snider was the first driver to complete his run, putting in a safe speed of 201.860 mph in a Foyt backup car. Later, Steve Chassey wrecked on his qualifying attempt. He would sit out the rest of the month with a concussion.

At 1 p.m. the field was filled to 33 cars. Chris Kneifel (199.831 mph) was on the bubble, the slowest car in the field. Among the drivers still not in the field was three-time winner Johnny Rutherford. He was struggling to get his car up to speed, and exhausted his three allotted attempts in a Foyt Chevy V-6. The team bought a back-up car from Galles, and Rutherford immediately began shaking the car down. Rutherford was in danger of missing the race for the second year in a row. In 1983, Rutherford was sidelined with a broken foot and broken ankle suffered in a practice crash.

At 5:50 p.m., with only ten minutes left before the 6 o'clock gun, Johnny Rutherford took to the track for one last attempt to qualify. His first lap was an impressive 203.156 mph, but the car began smoking as he went through the turns. Rutherford decided to ride it out, and he was not black-flagged. His speed slipped over the final three laps, but his four-lap average of 202.062 mph was fast enough to bump his way into the field.

Spike Gehlhausen (200.478 mph) was now on the bubble. Gary Bettenhausen made a last-ditch effort to bump him out, but he waved off after only two laps.

=== Bump Day – Sunday May 20 ===
As predicted, rain washed out the final day of time trials. Since the field had been filled to 33 cars a day earlier, the field was set, and there would be no further qualifying.

== Carburetion Day ==
The final practice was held Thursday May 24. All of the eligible cars took laps except for Johnny Rutherford. Rick Mears (208.719 mph) was the fastest driver of the day. No incidents were reported.

Jacques Villeneuve, who suffered a crash during practice while using his backup car on May 17, withdrew from the starting field after being ruled medically unfit to drive. The first alternate, Chris Kneifel was re-instated to the field to fill the vacancy. Kneifel became the last driver to start the Indianapolis 500 with a qualifying speed under 200 mph, and the first alternate starter since 1929.

=== Pit Stop Contest ===
The eliminations rounds for the 8th annual Miller Pit Stop Contest were held on Thursday May 24. The top four race qualifiers and their respective pit crews were automatically eligible: Tom Sneva, Howdy Holmes, Rick Mears, and Michael Andretti. Four additional spots would be available, for a total of eight participants. Qualifying heats were scheduled for Thursday May 17 in order to fill the four at-large berths.

On May 17, seven teams took part in qualifying heats. The results were as follows: Al Holbert (14.250 seconds), Dick Simon (15.469 seconds), Teo Fabi (16.832 seconds), and Tom Gloy (19.423 seconds). Mario Andretti posted a time of 13.306 seconds, but was penalized 10 seconds for running over an air hose. Al Unser Jr. and Geoff Brabham also failed to advance.

The eliminations would consist of two rounds. The preliminary round would feature two teams at a time, racing head-to-head against the clock. The two fastest teams overall - regardless of the individual head-to-head results - would advance to the final round. The preliminary pairings were as follows: Sneva vs. Gloy, Holmes vs. Fabi, Mears vs. Simon, and Andretti vs. Holbert.

Rick Mears was issued a 3-second penalty for a loose nut, which dropped him from 2nd to 5th. Tom Gloy was disqualified for stalling his engine and crossing the finish line not under power. Andretti and Holmes registered the two fastest times during the preliminary round, and both advanced to the final round. Andretti and his KRACO Racing team won the finals, the first rookie driver to win the event.

Preliminary Round
Rank	Car No.	Driver	Team	Time (seconds)
1	99	Michael Andretti	KRACO Racing	12.318
2	41	Howdy Holmes	Mayer Motor Racing	13.093
3	33	Teo Fabi	Forsythe Racing	13.786
4	22	Dick Simon	Dick Simon Racing	14.296
5	6	Rick Mears	Penske Racing	15.737
6	1	Tom Sneva	Mayer Motor Racing	16.714
7	77	Tom Gloy	Galles Racing	No time
8	21	Al Holbert	Alex Morales Motorsports	Withdrew

Finals
99	Michael Andretti (KRACO Racing)	18.520
41	Howdy Holmes (Mayer Motor Racing)	18.948

== Starting grid ==
Row	Inside	Middle	Outside
1	(United States) 1 - Tom Sneva W	(United States) 41 - Howdy Holmes	(United States) 6 - Rick Mears W
2	(United States) 99 - Michael Andretti R	(United States) 20 - Gordon Johncock W	(United States) 3 - Mario Andretti W
3	(Colombia) 9 - Roberto Guerrero R	(Australia) 18 - Geoff Brabham	(United States) 28 - Herm Johnson
4	(United States) 2 - Al Unser W	(United States) 25 - Danny Ongais	(United States) 14 - A. J. Foyt W
5	(United States) 77 - Tom Gloy R	(Italy) 33 - Teo Fabi	(United States) 7 - Al Unser Jr.
6	(United States) 21 - Al Holbert R	(United States) 16 - Tony Bettenhausen Jr.	(United States) 5 - Bobby Rahal
7	(United States) 35 - Patrick Bedard	(United States) 22 - Dick Simon	(United States) 10 - Pancho Carter
8	(United States) 40 - Chip Ganassi	(Brazil) 47 - Emerson Fittipaldi R	(Mexico) 55 - Josele Garza
9	(United States) 57 - Spike Gehlhausen	(United States) 37 - Scott Brayton	(United States) 98 - Kevin Cogan
10	(United States) 30 - Danny Sullivan	(Republic of Ireland) 61 - Derek Daly	(United States) 84 - Johnny Rutherford W
11	(United States) 4 - George Snider	(Australia) 50 - Dennis Firestone	(United States) 73 - Chris Kneifel

=== Qualified cars withdrawn ===
- Jacques Villeneuve (#76) – Withdrew qualified car due to practice crash on May 17

=== Alternates ===
- First alternate: Chris Kneifel (#73) - Bumped; Elevated to the starting field on May 24
- Second alternate: none

=== Failed to qualify ===
- Stan Fox R (#24) – Too slow, waved off
- Gary Bettenhausen (#8, #60, #82) – Too slow, waved off
- Tom Bigelow (#75) – Car quit during qualifying attempt
- Pete Halsmer (#11) – Too slow, waved off
- Roger Mears (#55, #76) – Too slow, waved off
- Steve Chassey (#56, #65) – Wrecked during qualifying attempt
- Johnny Parsons (#34, #59) – Incomplete qualifying attempt
- Bill Alsup (#27) – Too slow, waved off
- Ed Pimm (#64) – Incomplete qualifying attempt
- Phil Caliva R (#69) – Incomplete qualifying attempt
- Jim Crawford (#68, #78) – Too slow, waved off
- Mike Chandler (#88) – Practice crash, injured
- John Paul Jr. (#12) – Practice crash, injured
- Steve Krisiloff (#87) – Practice crash, injured
- Jerry Sneva (#66) – Practice crash, injured
- Larry Cannon (#81) – Practice crash
- Chuck Ciprich R (#36)
- Dick Ferguson (#31, #51)
- Chet Fillip (#38)
- Bruno Giacomelli R (#52)
- Jerry Karl (#59)
- Phil Krueger (#85)
- Desiré Wilson R (#34)
- Al Loquasto (#86) – Withdrew; team sold car to GTS Racing for Emerson Fittipaldi R

== Race summary ==
=== Start ===
Race day dawned cool and clear, with temperatures in the 60s. Rain was forecast for later in the afternoon, but was not expected to affect the race. Mary F. Hulman gave the command to start engines just before 11 a.m., and all cars pulled away for the pace laps.

At the start, Rick Mears got the jump and swept across the track to take the lead in turn one. Pole sitter Tom Sneva settled into second, and rookie Michael Andretti went from the inside of row 2 to take third. Mears led the first lap at a speed of 195.610 mph, a new Indy record for the opening lap. Geoff Brabham ducked into the pits after one lap, dropping out with a bad fuel line.

A few laps later, Michael Andretti passed Tom Sneva to take second place. Gordon Johncock also went to the pits for an unscheduled pit stop.

=== First half ===
The first 100 miles were run clean, with no incidents. Tom Sneva led Al Unser Jr., Rick Mears, Mario and Michael Andretti.

After 37 laps, race rookie and future two-time winner Emerson Fittipaldi dropped out due to low oil pressure. The two-time Formula One World Champion had a relatively quiet month of May, acclimating himself gradually to the Indy car circuit. It was a largely unnoticed effort in the underfunded W.I.T. Promotions entry, a pink-painted car. On lap 45, Spike Gehlhausen spun in turn 1, and came to a rest in turn 2 without contact bringing out the race's first caution flag.

Rick Mears took the lead for the second time on lap 54. On lap 58, Patrick Bedard suffered a terrible crash in turn four. The car spun to the inside of the north shortchute, hit the inside wall, flipped over, and barrel-rolled through the grass. The car broke into two pieces, the tub and the engine. Debris littered the track, and a lengthy caution was needed to clean up the incident. Bedard was injured, but the injuries were not life-threatening. Under the caution, Danny Sullivan came up too fast and ran into the car of Roberto Guerrero, hopping up on two wheels, and damaging his right-front suspension. Sullivan dropped out of the race, but Guerrero was able to continue.

The lead traded amongst Mears, Sneva, Mario Andretti, Teo Fabi, and Danny Ongais. After the lengthy caution for Bedard's crash, Tom Sneva came to the lead, and led at the halfway point. Around lap 70, the DataSpeed computer timing and scoring system crashed. The remainder of the race would have to be scored manually, and the scoring serials were at times incomplete. However, at no point was the leader of the race unknown or disputed.

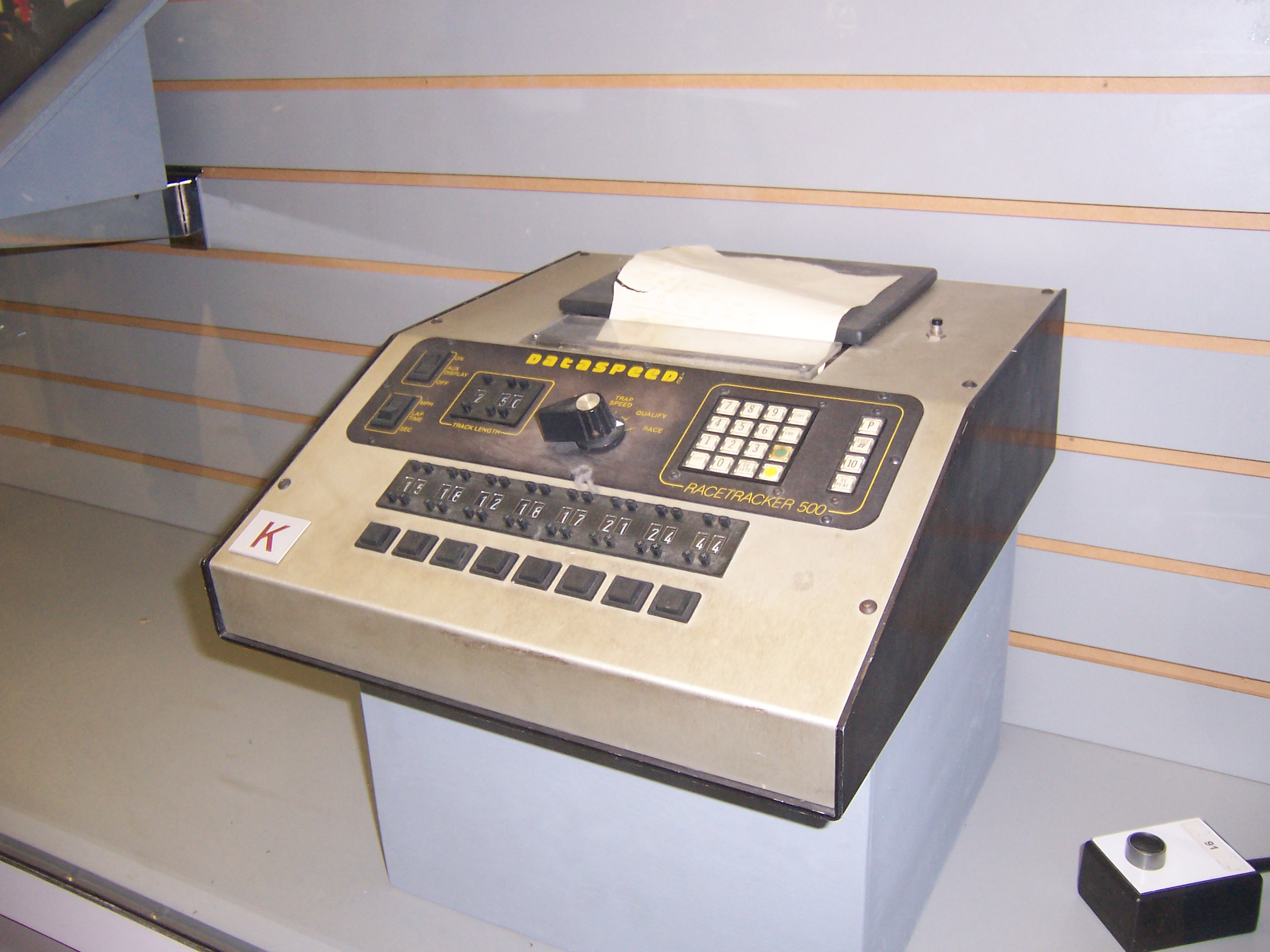
DataSpeed Timing and Scoring System

=== Second half ===
At lap 100, Tom Sneva led, looking for back-to-back wins. Al Unser Jr. was in second, Rick Mears third, Mario Andretti fourth, and Michael Andretti fifth. The rest of the top ten was Bobby Rahal, Roberto Guerrero, Al Holbert, Al Unser Sr., and Teo Fabi. Four laps later, however, Fabi was out with a broken fuel system.

On lap 103, Gordon Johncock hit the wall coming out of turn four. He spun to the inside, hit the pit wall, then spun back across the pits and hit the wall separating the pits from the track. He missed hitting Teo Fabi's car, which was being pushed back to the garage, and somehow missed hitting the crew members that were in the sign board area. Johncock injured his left ankle (he had suffered a right ankle injury at Michigan the previous year), and ultimately took a short retirement from racing.

With Rick Mears now leading, Mario Andretti started slipping in the standings due to a broken exhaust pipe. The engine was losing rpm, but he was still managing to stay in contention. After running in the top five most of the day, Al Unser Jr. dropped out on lap 131 with a broken water pump.

Tom Sneva briefly took the lead on laps 142-143 during a sequence of pit stops. Rick Mears was back in front on lap 144. With 50 laps to go, Rick Mears led Tom Sneva and Roberto Guerrero. Al Unser Sr. had now worked his way into the top five. Michael Andretti and Mario Andretti were also still in contention.

On lap 153, Mario Andretti went into the pits for a routine stop. He was held up in traffic, and the car of Josele Garza cut in front of him down the pit lane. Garza's car made contact, and broke the nosecone of Mario's car. It was too damaged to continue, and Mario was forced to drop out.

=== Finish ===
With several contenders dropping out in quick succession, the race came down to two drivers in the final 100 miles: Rick Mears and Tom Sneva. Scott Brayton stalled on the track on the leader's lap 163, bringing out the final caution of the race. With 33 laps to go, Sneva's crew debated pitting, hoping to make it to the finish on one more stop. They planned on pitting with 30 laps to go. On lap 168, however, sparks came from the back of Sneva's car in turn 3 as the field was preparing to go back to green. Sneva immediately ducked into the pits with a broken CV joint, and he climbed from the car. Mears, post-race, would remark, "I feel bad for him, but it's a relief for me...he was my toughest competitor."

With Sneva out of the race, Rick Mears now held a commanding lead. No other cars were in contention, with Mears now two laps ahead of the entire field. Mears cruised to the finish, and was not challenged the rest of the way. The only battle remained for second place, between Roberto Guerrero and Al Unser Sr.

A light drizzle started entering the area in the final 30 laps or so, threatening to end the race early. The heavy rain did not come, and Mears completed the 200 laps at a race record 163.612 mph. Mears won his second Indy 500, with a margin of victory of over two laps. Due to the ongoing scoring issues from the DataSpeed timing and scoring system, Al Unser Sr. was tentatively hand scored in second, with Roberto Guerrero unofficially third. For a brief period, it was Penske Racing's first 1-2 finish in the Indy 500. However, when scoring was ultimately resolved, Guerrero was rightfully elevated to second, with Unser dropping to third. After an eventful day - nearly being caught up in the Bedard crash, being hit by Sullivan during the ensuring yellow flag, overshooting his pit stall during one of his stops, and spinning in turn two - Guerrero was surprised to find out he finished second, and was voted co-Rookie of the Year with Michael Andretti.

== Box score ==
Finish	Grid	No	Name	Entrant	Chassis	Engine	Qual	Laps	Status
1	3	6	(United States) Rick Mears W	Penske Racing	March 84C	Cosworth DFX	207.847	200	163.612 mph
2	7	9	(Colombia) Roberto Guerrero R	Bignotti–Cotter Racing	March 84C	Cosworth DFX	205.717	198	-2 Laps
3	10	2	(United States) Al Unser W	Penske Racing	March 84C	Cosworth DFX	204.441	198	-2 Laps
4	16	21	(United States) Al Holbert R	Alex Morales Motorsports	March 84C	Cosworth DFX	203.016	198	-2 Laps
5	4	99	(United States) Michael Andretti R	KRACO Racing	March 84C	Cosworth DFX	207.805	198	-2 Laps
6	12	14	(United States) A. J. Foyt W	Gilmore Racing	March 84C	Cosworth DFX	203.860	197	-3 Laps
7	18	5	(United States) Bobby Rahal	Truesports	March 84C	Cosworth DFX	202.230	197	-3 Laps
8	9	28	(United States) Herm Johnson	Meanrd Racing	March 84C	Cosworth DFX	204.618	194	-6 Laps
9	11	25	(United States) Danny Ongais	Interscope Racing	March 84C	Cosworth DFX	203.978	193	-7 Laps
10	24	55	(Mexico) Josele Garza	Machinists Union Racing	March 84C	Cosworth DFX	200.615	193	-7 Laps
11	31	4	(United States) George Snider	Gilmore Racing	March 84C	Cosworth DFX	201.861	193	-7 Laps
12	32	50	(Australia) Dennis Firestone	Pace Racing	March 82C	Cosworth DFX	201.217	186	-14 Laps
13	2	41	(United States) Howdy Holmes	Mayer Racing	March 84C	Cosworth DFX	207.977	185	-15 Laps
14	13	77	(United States) Tom Gloy R	Galles Racing	March 84C	Cosworth DFX	203.758	179	Engine
15	33	73	(United States) Chris Kneifel	Primus Racing	Primus 84	Cosworth DFX	199.831	175	Transmission
16	1	1	(United States) Tom Sneva W	Mayer Racing	March 84C	Cosworth DFX	210.029	168	Left CV Joint
17	6	3	(United States) Mario Andretti W	Newman/Haas Racing	Lola T800	Cosworth DFX	207.466	153	Broken Nosecone
18	26	37	(United States) Scott Brayton	Brayton Racing	March 84C	Buick V-6	203.637	150	Transmission
19	21	10	(United States) Pancho Carter	American Dream Racing	March 84C	Cosworth DFX	201.820	141	Engine
20	27	98	(United States) Kevin Cogan	Forsythe Racing	Eagle 84SB	Pontiac V-8	203.622	137	Frozen Wheel
21	15	7	(United States) Al Unser Jr.	Galles Racing	March 84C	Cosworth DFX	203.404	131	Water Pump
22	30	84	(United States) Johnny Rutherford W	Gilmore Racing	March 84C	Cosworth DFX	202.062	116	Engine
23	20	22	(United States) Dick Simon	Dick Simon Racing	March 84C	Cosworth DFX	201.835	112	In Pits
24	14	33	(Italy) Teo Fabi	Forsythe Racing	March 84C	Cosworth DFX	203.600	104	Fuel System
25	5	20	(United States) Gordon Johncock W	Patrick Racing	March 84C	Cosworth DFX	207.545	103	Crash T4
26	17	16	(United States) Tony Bettenhausen Jr.	Provimi Veal Racing	March 84C	Cosworth DFX	202.814	86	Piston
27	29	61	(Republic of Ireland) Derek Daly	Provimi Veal Racing	March 84C	Cosworth DFX	202.443	76	Handling
28	22	40	(United States) Chip Ganassi	Patrick Racing	March 84C	Cosworth DFX	201.612	61	Engine
29	28	30	(United States) Danny Sullivan	Doug Shierson Racing	Lola T800	Cosworth DFX	203.567	57	Broken Wheel
30	19	35	(United States) Patrick Bedard	Brayton Racing	March 84C	Buick V-6	201.915	55	Crash NC
31	25	57	(United States) Spike Gehlhausen	Indy Auto Racing	March 84C	Cosworth DFX	200.478	45	Spun SC
32	23	47	(Brazil) Emerson Fittipaldi R	GTS Racing	March 84C	Cosworth DFX	201.078	37	Oil Pressure
33	8	18	(Australia) Geoff Brabham	KRACO Racing	March 84C	Cosworth DFX	204.931	1	Fuel Line

W Former Indianapolis 500 winner

R Indianapolis 500 Rookie

All cars utilized Goodyear tires.

=== Statistics ===
Lap Leaders
Laps	Leader
1–24	Rick Mears
25	Tom Sneva
26–47	Mario Andretti
48–49	Tom Sneva
50–53	Mario Andretti
54–59	Rick Mears
60	Tom Sneva
61–63	Mario Andretti
64–70	Teo Fabi
71–73	Danny Ongais
74–80	Teo Fabi
81–82	Tom Sneva
83–86	Al Unser Jr.
87–109	Tom Sneva
110–141	Rick Mears
142–143	Tom Sneva
144–200	Rick Mears

Total laps led
Driver	Laps
Rick Mears	119
Tom Sneva	31
Mario Andretti	29
Teo Fabi	14
Al Unser Jr.	4
Danny Ongais	3

Cautions: 5 for 34 laps
Laps	Reason
48–53	Spike Gehlhausen spin in turn 1
59–68	Patrick Bedard crash in turn 4
107–114	Gordon Johncock crash in pit area
154–158	Roberto Guerrero spin in turn 2
163–167	Scott Brayton stalled

== Broadcasting ==
=== Radio ===
The race was carried live on the IMS Radio Network. Paul Page served as the chief announcer for the eighth year. It was Page's eleventh year overall as part of the network crew. Lou Palmer reported from victory lane. Luke Walton introduced the starting command during the pre-race ceremonies, but did not have on-air duties during the race itself.

Bob Forbes spent the early segments of the race covering the center pits, then spent the second half of the race concentrating on covering the garage area and track hospital. Sally Larvick was once again used in a limited role, conducting interviews. She also reported from the track hospital in the early portions of the race. This was the last year of the Backstretch reporter. The Backstretch reporter would return for a two-year period from 1989 to 1990 but have a very limited role both years.

This would be the final 500 on the crew for Doug Zink, who debuted in 1966. Zink died April 3, 2016.

Indianapolis Motor Speedway Radio Network
Booth Announcers	Turn Reporters	Pit/garage reporters
Chief Announcer: Paul Page; Driver expert: Rodger Ward; Statistician: John DeCamp; Historian: Donald Davidson	Turn 1: Ron Carrell; Turn 2: Doug Zink; Backstretch: Howdy Bell; Turn 3: Larry Henry; Turn 4: Bob Jenkins	Luke Walton (pre-race); Sally Larvick (interviews/hospital)
Chief Announcer: Paul Page; Driver expert: Rodger Ward; Statistician: John DeCamp; Historian: Donald Davidson	Turn 1: Ron Carrell; Turn 2: Doug Zink; Backstretch: Howdy Bell; Turn 3: Larry Henry; Turn 4: Bob Jenkins	Jerry Baker (north pits); Chuck Marlowe (center pits); Bob Forbes (center pits/garages); Lou Palmer (south pits)

=== Television ===
The race was carried in the United States on ABC Sports on a same-day tape delay basis. Jackie Stewart served as the host position in "ABC Race Central" for the final time. Jack Arute joined the crew as a pit reporter, a position he would hold for over 20 years. After 1983, Chris Economaki left ABC, and joined CBS for the Daytona 500 and other NASCAR events. Larry Nuber debuted as a pit reporter in his first Indy assignment, and ABC News and ABC Sports correspondent Ray Gandolf supplied in-depth features.

A new camera angle was introduced for this broadcast, located on the start's stand over the shoulder of the flagman. The angle would be used at the dropping of the green flag as well as the finish.

The race was televised in Brasil for the first time, as the debut of former Formula One champion Emerson Fittipaldi attracted national interest. Record aired the race with Emerson's father Wilson Fittipaldi as announcer.

The broadcast has re-aired on ESPN Classic since May 2011.

ABC Television
Booth Announcers	Pit/garage reporters
Host: Jackie Stewart; Announcer: Jim McKay; Color: Sam Posey	Bill Flemming; Jack Arute; Larry Nuber; Ray Gandolf (features)

== Gallery ==
1984 Pontiac Fiero pace car

== Notes ==
=== See also ===
- 1983-84 USAC Championship Car season

=== Works cited ===
- 1984 Indianapolis Day-To-Day Trackside Report for the Media: Indianapolis Motor Speedway
- 1984 Indianapolis 500 Telecast: ABC-TV, May 27, 1984
- Indianapolis 500 History: Race & All-Time Stats - Official Site
- 1984 Indianapolis 500 Radio Broadcast, Indianapolis Motor Speedway Radio Network

1983 Indianapolis 500; Tom Sneva	1984 Indianapolis 500; Rick Mears	1985 Indianapolis 500; Danny Sullivan
Preceded by 162.962 mph (1972 Indianapolis 500)	Record for the fastest average speed 163.612 mph	Succeeded by 170.722 mph (1986 Indianapolis 500)
