= Lola T800 =

Racing car designed and built by Lola Cars

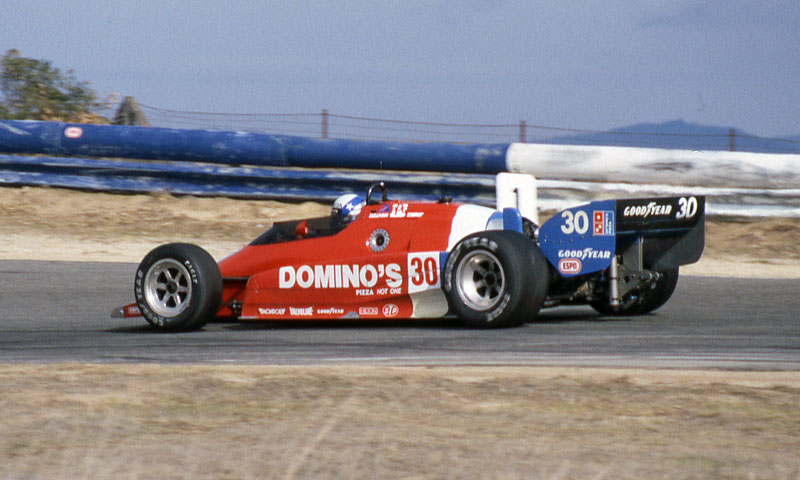
Lola T800-Cosworth

The Lola T800 is an open-wheel racing car chassis, designed and built by Lola Cars that competed in the CART open-wheel racing series, for competition in the 1984 IndyCar season. The T800 was the Newman Haas Racing team's emergency vehicle in the CART series.

The Newman-Haas team, founded by Paul Newman and Carl Haas in 1983, was only in its second season when it fielded the best-of-season vehicle, the T800. The Monoposto was powered by a Cosworth turbo engine and was driven by Mario Andretti and Danny Sullivan. From Andretti's maiden win at Meadowlands, he and Sullivan won eight straight races, with Andretti winning five times and Sullivan winning three races. However, the two drivers were unable to win the most important race of the year, the Indianapolis 500-mile race. At Indianapolis Motor Speedway, winner Rick Mears led a phalanx of five March 84Cs. Andretti secured the 1984 CART championship with the T800. It was powered by the 800 hp (600 kW) Ford-Cosworth DFX.
