= Chip Ganassi =

American racing team owner

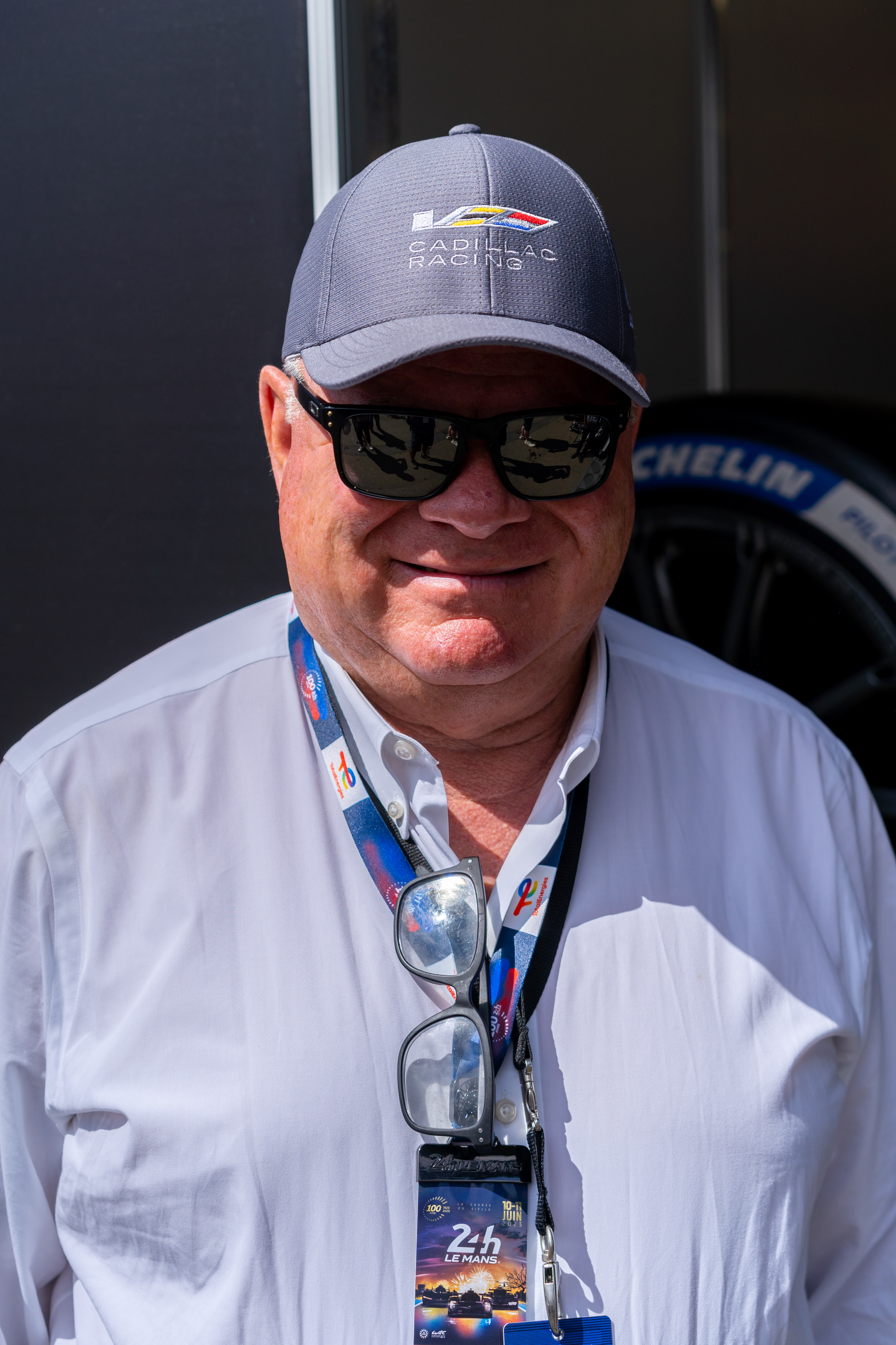
- Ganassi at Le Mans in 2023
- Born: Floyd Ganassi Jr. May 24, 1958 (age 68); Monessen, Pennsylvania, U.S.
- Education: Fox Chapel Area High School; Duquesne University (BA)
- Occupations: Owner and CEO, Chip Ganassi Racing Teams
- Years active: 1990–present
- Employer: Chip Ganassi Racing Teams
- Website: ChipGanassiRacing.com

Floyd "Chip" Ganassi Jr. (born May 24, 1958) is an American businessman, former racing driver, current team owner and member of the Motorsports Hall of Fame of America. He has been involved with the North American auto racing scene for over 30 years. He is owner and CEO of Chip Ganassi Racing which operates teams in the IndyCar Series, WeatherTech SportsCar Championship, FIA World Endurance Championship, and Extreme E. He is the only team owner in history to have won the Indianapolis 500, the Daytona 500, the Brickyard 400, the Rolex 24 at Daytona, the 12 Hours of Sebring and even a GT class victory at the 24 Hours of Le Mans.

== Racing driver ==
Ganassi attended the Bob Bondurant Driving School in 1977 while a student at the Fox Chapel Area High School. He won his first auto race in a Formula Ford at the age of 18. He began his Championship Auto Racing Teams (CART) racing career in 1982 upon graduating from Duquesne. Though a broken camshaft kept him from completing his first CART race at Phoenix, Ganassi qualified with the fastest speed, 197 mph, and competed in the Indianapolis 500 five times, with a best finish of 8th in 1983. He was voted the Most Improved Driver in 1983, and took 9th position in the CART standings. During that season, he took Patrick Racing’s Wildcat onto the podium twice, the first at Caesars Palace in Las Vegas and then again at Laguna Seca. The following season, he would go on to finish a career-best second place in the 1984 Budweiser Grand Prix of Cleveland.

Ganassi's career was cut short by a huge crash at the 1984 Michigan 500, the race immediately following the Grand Prix of Cleveland. In one of many major accidents to occur in that year's race, Ganassi spun his car coming off one of the banked turns, and collided with Al Unser Jr.'s car. Ganassi's car then skated across the grass run-off area, slammed into the inside Armco barrier, tumbled multiple times and broke apart. Unser was uninjured, but Ganassi suffered serious head injuries. When CART doctor Stephen Olvey reached Ganassi he found him unconscious and unresponsive, and initially feared that Ganassi had been killed in the accident. When Olvey was about to start administering CPR, Ganassi resumed breathing. He was airlifted to the University of Michigan Hospital. After a time he regained consciousness, and while he initially suffered short-term memory loss, he would go on to feel he had made a full recovery. Ganassi never returned to driving full-time after the accident, although briefly drove in both CART and IMSA in 1986. Ganassi achieved his top sportscar result in the 1986 Kodak Copies 500 at Watkins Glen, taking the Camel Light class victory with his race partner, Bob Earl (seventh overall). He also recorded a seventh-place finish a month earlier in the Löwenbräu Classic at Road America, assisted by David Sears. Both times driving for Spice Engineering, in one for their Spice-Pontiac SE86CL. In what was to be his last international race outing, Ganassi was entered into the 1987 24 Hours of Le Mans as a member of Kouros Racing. One of his teammates for the event, Johnny Dumfries, set the fastest lap of the race prior to handing the car over to Ganassi, upon whom the gearbox broke.

== Team owner ==
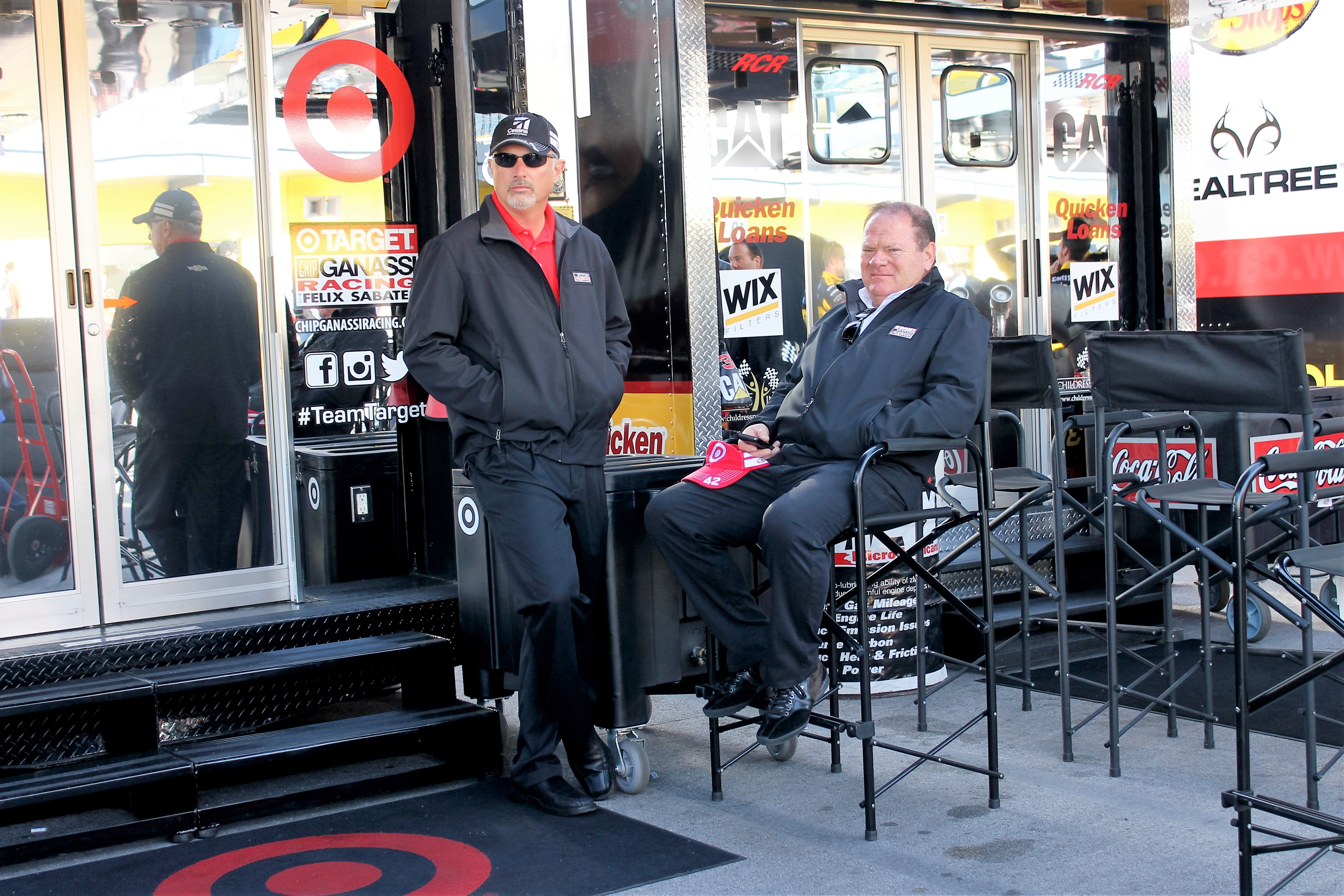
Ganassi and Lorin Ranier at Las Vegas Motor Speedway in 2014

== Personal life ==
Ganassi was formerly a vice president of FRG Group, his father's organization involved in commercial real estate, transportation and other areas. In addition to his racing interests, he is also a former minority owner of the Pittsburgh Pirates major league baseball team. Ganassi is a strong supporter of St. Jude Children's Research Hospital, to which his teams have donated over US$500,000.

Ganassi attended the Monessen School district prior to his family moving to the Fox Chapel. He graduated from the Fox Chapel Area High School in 1978 and with a degree in finance from Duquesne University in 1982. He received an Honorary Doctorate from Carnegie Mellon University in 2011.

Ganassi appeared in Sylvester Stallone's movie Driven; the film took place in a fictionalized 2001 CART season. He is credited as "Team Owner" and Til Schweiger played as Beau Brandenburg.

== Awards ==
Ganassi was inducted into the Motorsports Hall of Fame of America in 2016.

== Racing record ==
=== Career highlights ===
Season	Series	Position	Team	Car
1981	Robert Bosch Formula Super Vee Championship	6th		March-Volkswagen 79/80SV; Ralt-Volkswagen RT5
1981-82	USAC Gold Crown Series	37th	First Commercial Corp.	Wildcat-Cosworth
1982	PPG Indy Car World Series	34th	Rhoades Racing	Wildcat-Cosworth
1982-83	USAC Gold Crown Series	16th	Patrick Racing	Wildcat-Cosworth
1983	PPG Indy Car World Series	9th	Patrick Racing	Wildcat-Cosworth
1983-84	USAC Gold Crown Series	32nd	Patrick Racing	March-Cosworth 84C
1984	PPG Indy Car World Series	20th	Patrick Racing	Wildcat-Cosworth; March-Cosworth 84C
1986	IMSA Camel Light Championship	35th	Spice Engineering	Spice-Pontiac SE86CL

=== American open-wheel racing results ===
(key)

==== CART ====
Year	Team	1	2	3	4	5	6	7	8	9	10	11	12	13	14	15	16	17	Rank	Points	Ref
1981	Brayton Racing	PHX1	MIL1	ATL1	ATL2	MIS	RIV	MIL2	MIS2	WGL	MEX	PHX2; DNQ							NC	-	
1982	Rhoades Racing	PHX1; 22	ATL	MIL1	CLE; 11	MIS1; 31	MIL2	POC; 17	RIV	ROA	MIS2; 16	PHX2							34th	10	
1983	Patrick Racing	ATL	INDY; 8	MIL	CLE; 13	MIS1; 8	ROA; 21	POC; 26	RIV	MDO; 25	MIS2; 6	LVG; 3	LS; 3	PHX; 5					9th	56	
1984	Patrick Racing	LBH; 25	PHX1; 11	INDY; 28	MIL; 11	POR; 15	MEA; 9	CLE; 2	MIS1; 27	ROA	POC	MDO	SAN	MIS2	PHX2; Wth	LS	LVG		20th	24	
1985	A. J. Foyt Enterprises	LBH	INDY; 22	MIL	POR	MEA	CLE												51st	0	
1985	Machinists Union Racing							MIS1; 22	ROA	POC	MDO	SAN	MIS2	LS	PHX	MIA			51st	0	
1986	Machinists Union Racing	PHX1; 14	LBH	INDY; 21	MIL	POR	MEA	CLE	TOR	MIS1	POC	MDO	SAN	MIS2	ROA	LS	PHX2	MIA	43rd	0	

==== Indianapolis 500 ====
Year	Car	Start	Qual	Rank	Finish	Laps	Led	Retired
1982	12	11	197.705	13	15	147	0	Engine
1983	60	16	197.608	24	8	195	0	Running
1984	40	22	201.612	28	28	61	0	Engine
1985	84	25	206.104	25	22	121	0	Fuel Line
1986	31	26	207.590	31	29	70	0	Head Gasket
Totals						594	0	

Starts	5
Poles	0
Front Row	0
Wins	0
Top 5	0
Top 10	1
Retired	4

=== Complete 24 Hours of Le Mans results ===
Year	Team	Co-Drivers	Car	Class	Laps	Pos.	Class Pos.
1987	(Switzerland) Kouros Racing	(United Kingdom) Johnny Dumfries (New Zealand) Mike Thackwell	Sauber-Mercedes C9	C1	37	DNF (Gearbox)	

=== Complete 24 Hours of Daytona results ===
Year	Team	Co-Drivers	Car	Class	Laps	Pos.	Class Pos.
1986	(United States) RC Buick Hawk/Conte	(United States) John Paul Jr. (Italy) Ivan Capelli (United States) Whitney Ganz	March-Buick 85G	GTP	310	DNF (Engine)	

=== Complete 24 Hours of Spa results ===
Year	Team	Co-Drivers	Car	Class	Laps	Pos.	Class Pos.
1980	(Belgium) I.M.C. Toyota	(Belgium) Emmanuel Remion (Belgium) José Close	Toyota Corolla GT	ser.T1.6		DNQ	

Sporting positions
Preceded by Adrian Newey	John Bolster Lifetime Achievement Award; 2010	Succeeded by Giampaolo Dallara
Preceded by n/a	Cameron R. Argetsinger Award; 2014	Succeeded by n/a
