= Kraco Enterprises =

American private company

- Type: Private
- Industry: Automobile
- Founded: 1954
- Founder: Maurice H. Kraines
- Headquarters: 505 E. Euclid Avenue, Compton, CA 90224, USA
- Products: Automotive Aftermarket
- Revenue: 200 million USD
- Number of employees: 250
- Parent: Sun Capital Partners
- Website: Kraco.com

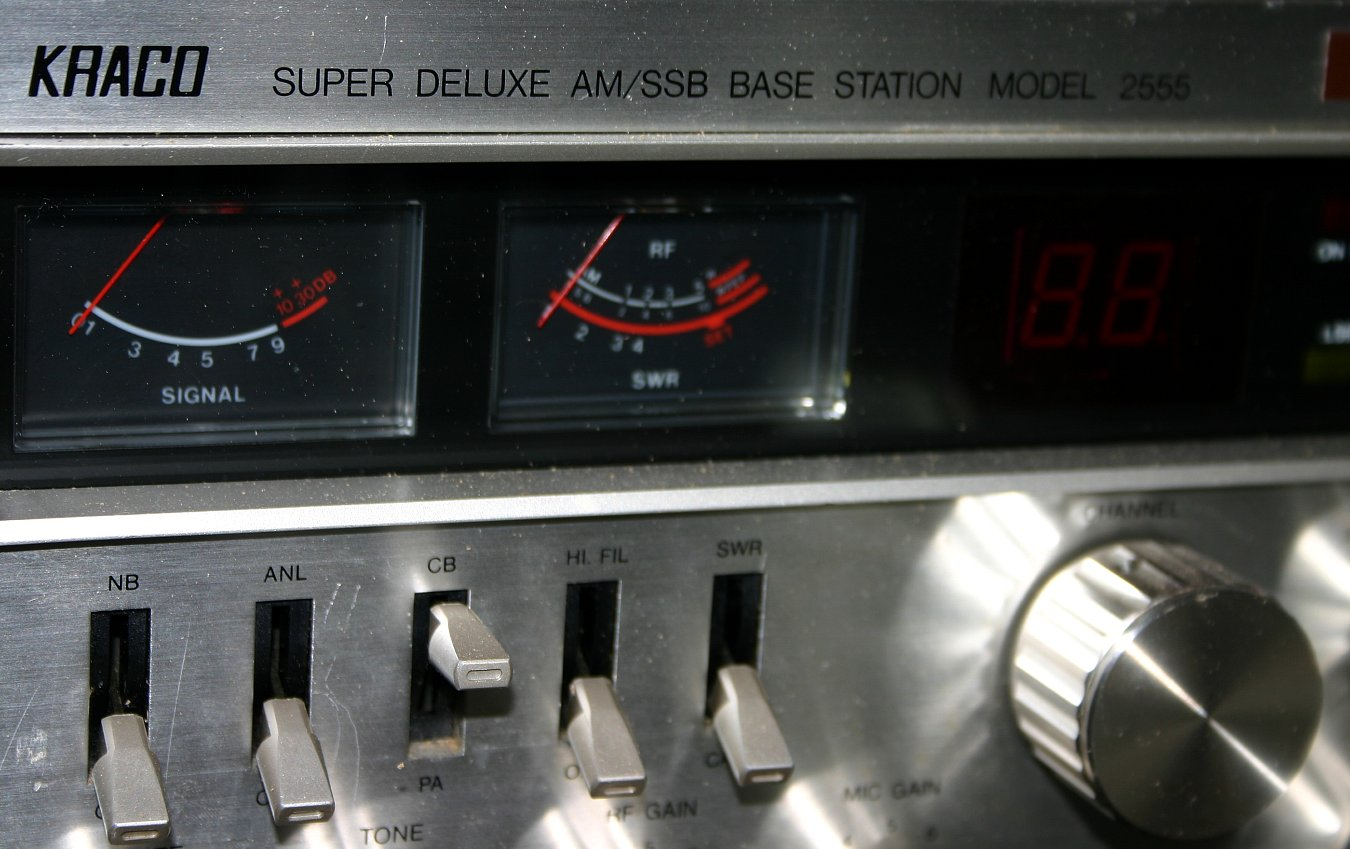
A Kraco Super Deluxe CB transmitter

Kraco Enterprises, LLC, is an American private company. It primarily manufactures fabricated rubber products for a wide variety of purposes and applications. While they mainly produce floormats, they have also been a supplier for the automotive industry producing tire walls and even audio equipment including car speakers, stereos, and CB radios. Kraco was founded in 1954 in Compton, California. Their first product was "Snap-on" white walls to create temporary white-walled tires. They moved into making rubber, vinyl and soon thereafter, carpet floormats as the business expanded.

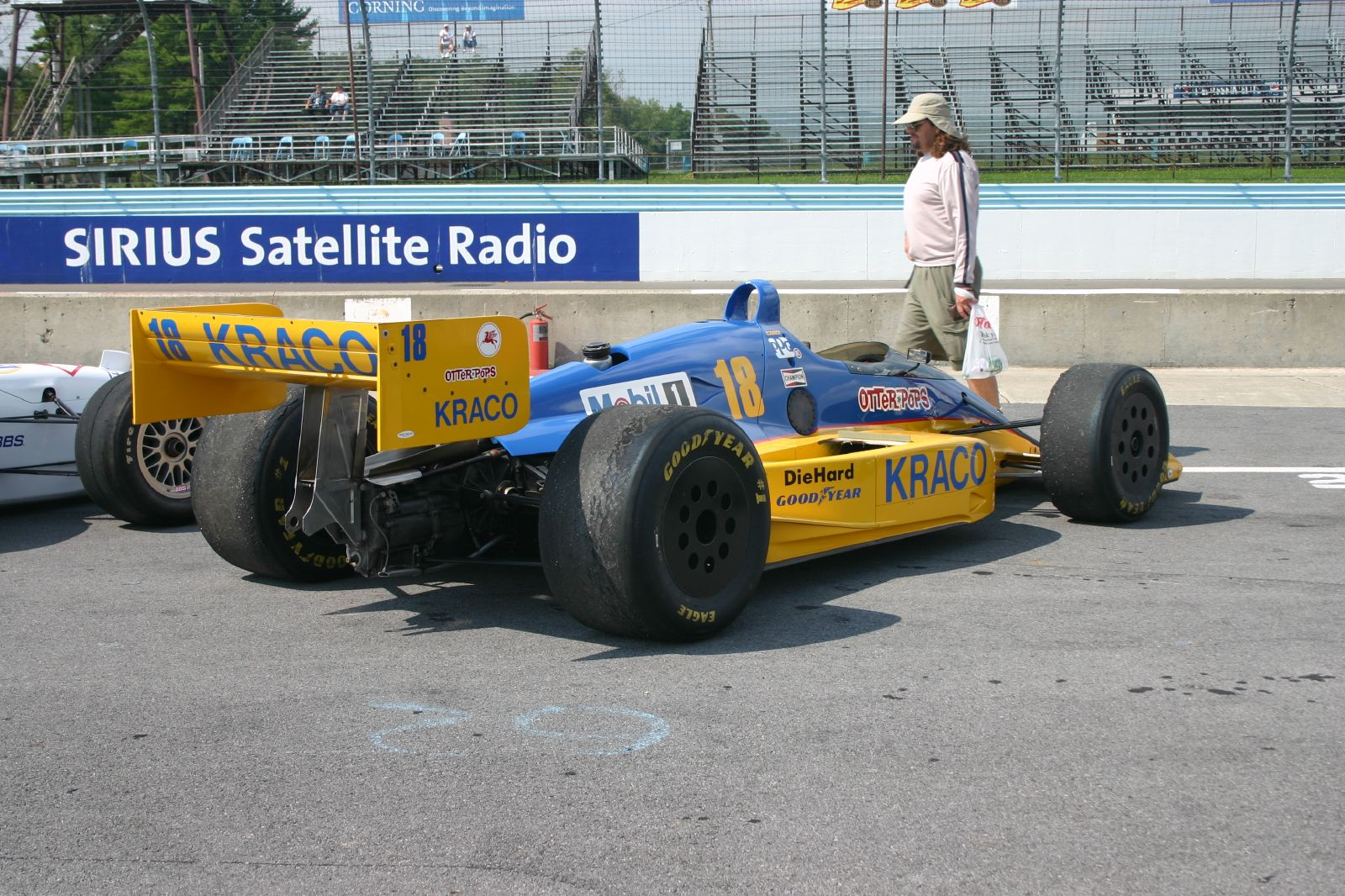
Bobby Rahal's Kraco-sponsored IndyCar from 1989

During the 1980s and 1990s, Kraco sponsored Indy Car racing with drivers Michael Andretti, Bobby Rahal and Al Unser Jr., winning the Indianapolis 500 in 1992.

Sun Capital Partners, an American investment firm, acquired Kraco in August 2008. In 2010, Kraco Enterprises purchased Auto Expressions, a provider of automobile accessories, which resulted in Kraco tripling its revenue.

In the U.K., Kraco products are distributed by its subsidiary Kraco Car Care International Limited (Shell Car Care International Limited until October 1, 2010), which also inherited the distribution of Rain-X products in the U.K.

On October 21, 2015, Kraco Enterprises has acquired Who-Rae, a manufacturer and distributor of automotive aftermarket accessories.

== Race results ==
=== PPG CART Indycar World Series ===
(key)

Year	Chassis	Engine	Drivers	No.	1	2	3	4	5	6	7	8	9	10	11	12	13	14	15	16	17	Pts Pos	Pos
1981					PHX	MIL	ATL		MCH	RIV	MIL	MCH	WGL	MXC	PHX								
1981	Penske PC-7/79	Cosworth DFX	(United States) Larry Cannon	99		15	11	20	12													30th	10
1981	Penske PC-7/79	Cosworth DFX	(United States) Dick Ferguson	99						18		6		10	7							24th	20
1982					PHX	ATL	MIL	CLE	MCH	MIL	POC	RIV	ROA	MCH	PHX								
1982	Penske PC-9B/81	Cosworth DFX	(United States) Bill Vukovich Jr.	18			11															41st	2
1982	Penske PC-9B/81	Cosworth DFX	(United States) Dick Ferguson	18	17	DNS																47th	1
1982	March 82C	Cosworth DFX	(United States) Mike Mosley	18					8	7	16			7	12							19th	37
1982	March 82C	Cosworth DFX	(Australia) Vern Schuppan	99				7														30th	18
1982	Penske PC-9B/81	Cosworth DFX	(Australia) Vern Schuppan	99								27	24									30th	18
1983					ATL	INDY	MIL	CLE	MCH	ROA	POC	RIV	MDO	MCH	CPL	LAG	PHX						
1983	March 83C	Cosworth DFX	(United States) Mike Mosley	18	13	13	5	4	17	25	4	24	DNQ	11			24					14th	36
1983	March 83C	Cosworth DFX	(Australia) Geoff Brabham	18											20	16						21st	13
1983	March 83C	Cosworth DFX	(Australia) Geoff Brabham	99								18		12								21st	13
1983	March 83C	Cosworth DFX	(United States) Michael Andretti (R)	99											19	24	9					27th	4
1984					LBH	PHX	INDY	MIL	POR	MEA	CLE	MCH	ROA	POC	MDO	SAN	MCH	PHX	LAG	CPL			
1984	March 84C	Cosworth DFX	(Australia) Geoff Brabham	18	2	16	33	17	2	3	8	9	5	14	21	15	11	16	5	5		8th	87
1984	March 84C	Cosworth DFX	(United States) Michael Andretti	99	10	3	5	4	12	13	3	20	16	23	16	3	7	3	3	24		7th	102
1985					LBH	INDY	MIL	POR	MEA	CLE	MCH	ROA	POC	MDO	SAN	MCH	LAG	PHX	MIA				
1985	March 85C	Cosworth DFX	(United States) Kevin Cogan	18	23	11	16	5	7	9	7	25	17	21	9	4	17	22	24			14th	44
1985	March 85C	Cosworth DFX	(United States) Michael Andretti	99	19	8	19	28	4	7	27	2	13	14	19	25	9	5	25			9th	53
1986					PHX	LBH	INDY	MIL	POR	MEA	CLE	TOR	MCH	POC	MDO	SAN	MCH	ROA	LAG	PHX	MIA		
1986	March 86C	Cosworth DFX	(United States) Michael Andretti	18	15*	1*	6	1*	2*	20	2	19	11	11*	10	6	2*	2*	3	1*	18	2nd	171
1987					LBH	PHX	INDY	MIL	POR	MEA	CLE	TOR	MCH	POC	ROA	MDO	NAZ	LAG	MIA				
1987	March 87C	Cosworth DFX	(United States) Michael Andretti	18	4	4	29	1	2	5	6	5	1*	8	16	13	1*	22	1*			2nd	158
1988					PHX	LBH	INDY	MIL	POR	CLE	TOR	MEA	MCH	POC	MDO	ROA	NAZ	LAG	MIA				
1988	March 88C	Cosworth DFX	(United States) Michael Andretti	18	3	7	4	7	11	14	3	6										6th	119
1988	Lola T88/00	Cosworth DFX	(United States) Michael Andretti	18									3	25	26	5	2	2	17			6th	119
1989					PHX	LBH	INDY	MIL	DET	POR	CLE	MEA	TOR	MCH	POC	MDO	ROA	NAZ	LAG				
1989	Lola T89/00	Cosworth DFS	(United States) Bobby Rahal	18	18	4	26	13	18	2	3	1	19	9	6	22	28	7	6			9th	88
Galles-Kraco Racing
1990					PHX	LBH	INDY	MIL	DET	POR	CLE	MEA	TOR	MCH	DEN	VAN	MDO	ROA	NAZ	LAG			
1990	Lola T90/00	Chevrolet 265A V8t	(United States) Al Unser Jr.	5	3	1*	4	1	27	3	15*	11	1*	1	1*	1*	3	4	16	2		1st	210
1990	Lola T90/00	Chevrolet 265A V8t	(United States) Bobby Rahal	18	2	12	2	4	2	11	2	25	22	2	3	8	6	7	3	5		4th	153
1991					SFR	LBH	PHX	INDY	MIL	DET	POR	CLE	MEA	TOR	MCH	DEN	VAN	MDO	ROA	NAZ	LAG		
1991	Lola T91/00	Chevrolet 265A V8t	(United States) Al Unser Jr.	1	16*	1*	6	4	19	4	4	4	2	23	3	1*	3	5	2	4	2	3rd	197
1991	Lola T91/00	Chevrolet 265A V8t	(United States) Bobby Rahal	18	2	2	2	19	4	2	3	3	1*	3	11	20	2	3	4	2	24	2nd	200
1992					SFR	PHX	LBH	INDY	DET	POR	MIL	NHA	TOR	MCH	CLE	ROA	VAN	MDO	NAZ	LAG			
1992	Galmer G92	Chevrolet 265A V8t	(United States) Al Unser Jr.	3	4	5	4*	1	9	3	7	8	7	4	3	2	2	3	11	9		3rd	169
1992	Galmer G92	Chevrolet 265A V8t	(United States) Danny Sullivan	18	5	12	1	5	5	12	12	9	3	8	20	7	7	8	17	7		7th	99

== IndyCar wins ==
#	Season	Date	Sanction	Track / Race	No.	Winning driver	Chassis	Engine	Tire	Grid	Laps Led
1	1986	April 13	CART	Grand Prix of Long Beach (S)	18	(United States) Michael Andretti	March 86C	Cosworth DFX V8t	Goodyear	7	47
2	1986	June 8	CART	Milwaukee Mile (O)	18	(United States) Michael Andretti (2)	March 86C	Cosworth DFX V8t	Goodyear	Pole	110
3	1986	August 29	CART	Phoenix International Raceway (O)	18	(United States) Michael Andretti (3)	March 86C	Cosworth DFX V8t	Goodyear	4	166
4	1987	May 31	CART	Milwaukee Mile (O)	18	(United States) Michael Andretti (4)	March 87C	Cosworth DFX V8t	Goodyear	4	52
5	1987	August 2	CART	Michigan 500 (O)	18	(United States) Michael Andretti (5)	March 87C	Cosworth DFX V8t	Goodyear	Pole	129
6	1987	September 20	CART	Nazareth Speedway (O)	18	(United States) Michael Andretti (6)	March 87C	Cosworth DFX V8t	Goodyear	Pole	150
7	1987	November 1	CART	Tamiami Park, Miami (S)	18	(United States) Michael Andretti (7)	March 87C	Cosworth DFX V8t	Goodyear	2	88
NC	1988	November 5	CART	Tamiami Park, Miami (S)	18	(United States) Michael Andretti	Lola T88/00	Cosworth DFX V8t	Goodyear	6	19
8	1989	July 16	CART	Meadowlands Street Circuit (S)	18	(United States) Bobby Rahal	Lola T89/00	Cosworth DFS V8t	Goodyear	6	61

- Note: this does not include wins achieved in 1990, 1991 and 1992 as Galles-Kraco Racing.
