= March 84C =

Racecar by March Engineering

The March 84C is an open-wheel race car built by March Engineering, to compete in the 1984 IndyCar season. The car was just as successful as its predecessor the March 83C, as it clinched the 1984 Constructors' Championship, and the 1984 Indianapolis 500 with Rick Mears, with a total 10 wins and 8 pole positions out of 16 races. The 84C was powered by the Ford-Cosworth DFX turbo V8 engine, but also occasionally used the Buick Indy V6 engine.

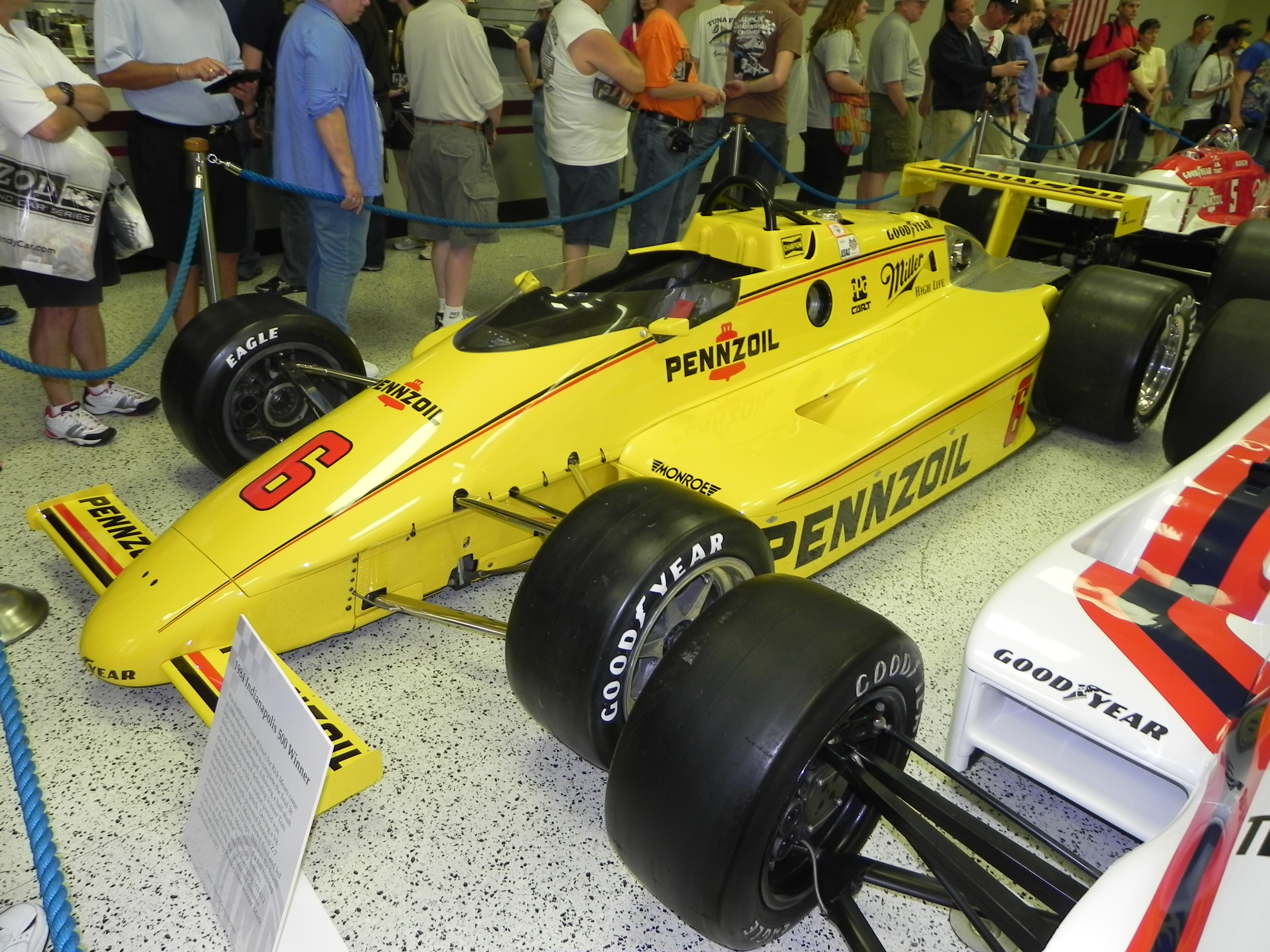
1984 Indy 500-winning chassis of Rick Mears

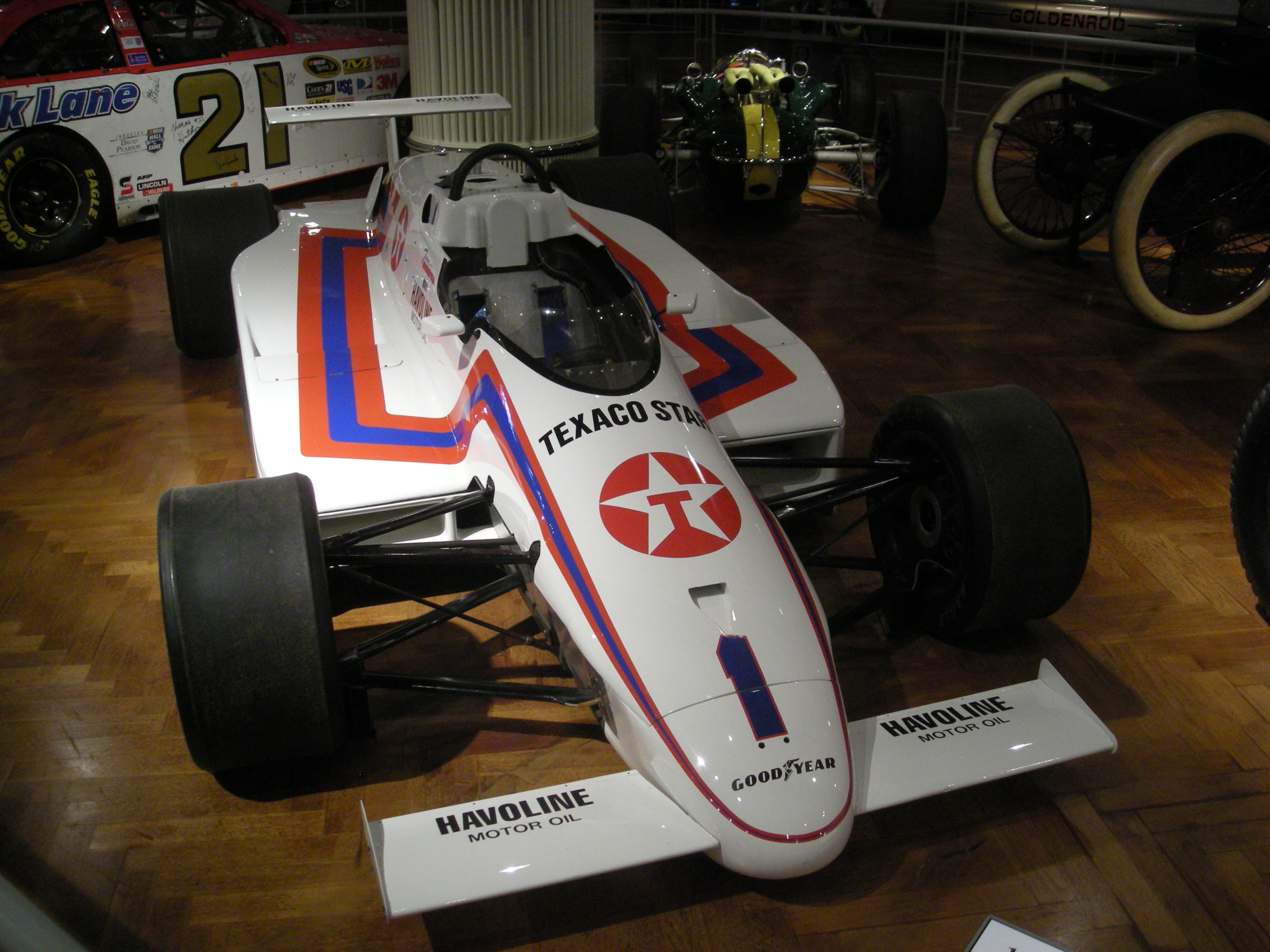
March 84C of Tom Sneva

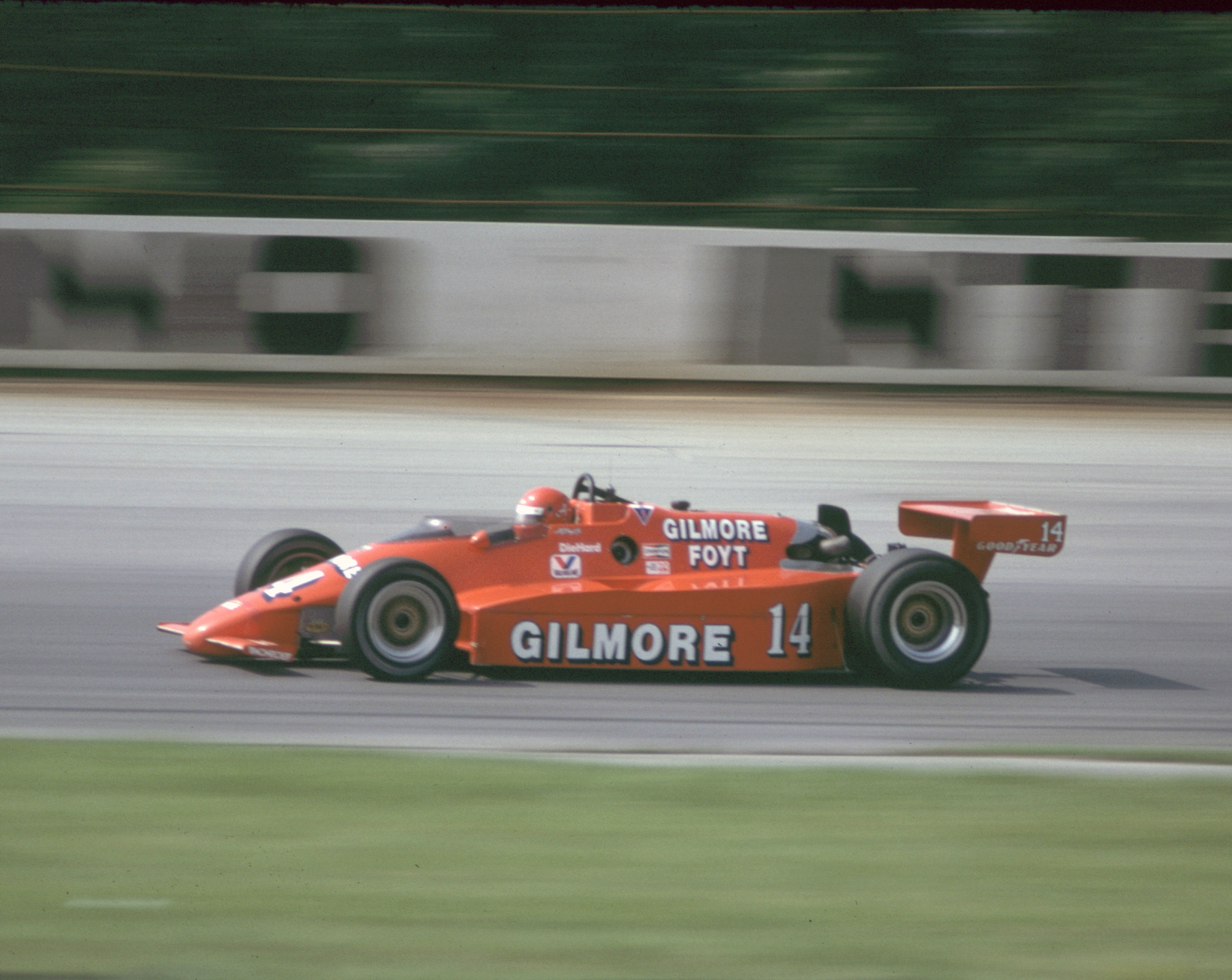
March 84C of A. J. Foyt

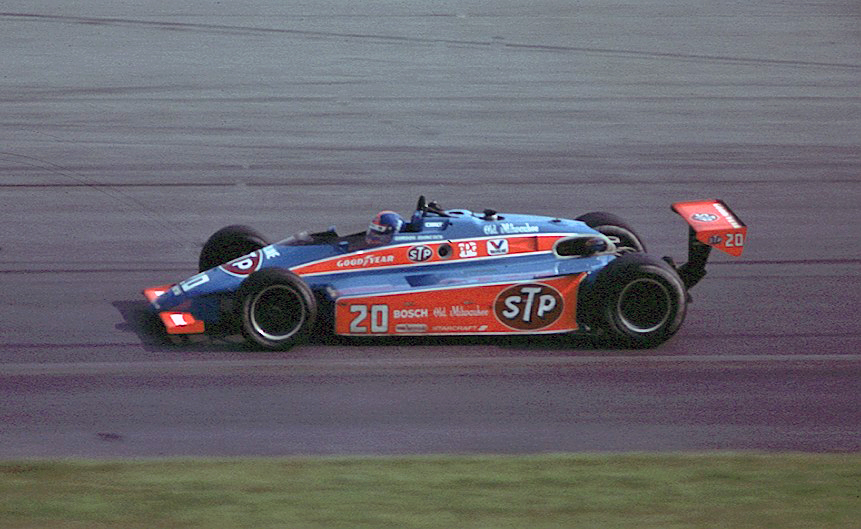
March 84C of Gordon Johncock
