= Stan Fox =

American racing driver (1952–2000)

- Nationality: (United States) American
- Born: Stanley Cole Fuchs; July 7, 1952 Janesville, Wisconsin, U.S.
- Died: December 18, 2000 (aged 48) Waiouru, Ruapehu, New Zealand

Champ Car career
- 13 races run over 10 years
- Years active: 1984, 1987–1995
- Best finish: 24th – 1991
- First race: 1984 Dana Rex Mays Classic (Milwaukee)
- Last race: 1995 Indianapolis 500 (Indianapolis)
Wins	Podiums	Poles
0	0	0

NASCAR Cup Series career
- 2 races run over 1 year
- Best finish: 68th (1992)
- First race: 1992 DieHard 500 (Talladega)
- Last race: 1992 Champion Spark Plug 400 (Michigan)
Wins	Top tens	Poles
0	0	0

Stanley Cole Fuchs (July 7, 1952 – December 18, 2000), known professionally as Stan Fox (Fuchs being the German word for "fox"), was an American open wheel race car driver. Fox was one of the last links between the midget car racing world and the Indianapolis 500.

== Midget car career ==
Fox began his career as a midget car racer. He won the 1979 Badger Midget championship, and the 1979 and 1980 Belleville Midget Nationals. He placed in the top twelve in points in nine seasons, even after he raced sporadically after moving to United States Auto Club (USAC) open wheel events. He had 19 USAC career wins. He won the Turkey Night Grand Prix in 1990 at the last event at Ascot Park. He won the 1991 Turkey Night Grand Prix, two Copper World Classics, three Rex Easton Memorials at Springfield, Illinois, two Rodger Mauro Classics, and the midget car portion of the 4-Crown Nationals at Eldora Speedway.

== IndyCar career ==
Fox competed in the Indianapolis 500 eight times between 1987 and 1995 driving for A. J. Foyt and Ron Hemelgarn. He was also a motorcycle racing enthusiast.

=== Near-fatal crash at Indianapolis ===
While driving for Ron Hemelgarn, Fox was seriously injured during the 1995 Indianapolis 500 in an accident. After starting ninth, Fox went low into the first turn on the first lap of the race and spun. His car connected with the car of Eddie Cheever, Jr. and slammed into the outside wall. Several other cars also became involved. The front nose-cone was ripped from his car, exposing his legs. Fox suffered serious head injuries which put him in a coma for five days, and had surgery to have a blood clot removed from his brain. After a month, Fox was moved from the Methodist Hospital critical care unit to a private room, and showed signs of improvement.

The accident ended Fox's racing career but he stayed involved with the sport. He started the non-profit organization Friends of the Fox which supports people with head injuries and brings a person to the track each May to meet drivers and get VIP treatment.

== Death ==
Fox was killed in a head-on collision on December 18, 2000, on the Desert Road some 200 miles (320 km) south of Auckland, New Zealand. Fox was driving through the night to attend a speedway meeting and collided head on with a northbound vehicle.

== Career award ==
- Fox was inducted in the National Midget Auto Racing Hall of Fame.

== Racing record ==
=== American open–wheel racing results ===
(key)

==== CART ====
Year	Team	1	2	3	4	5	6	7	8	9	10	11	12	13	14	15	16	17	Rank	Points	Ref
1984	Pabst Racing	LBH	PHX	INDY; DNQ	MIL; 24	POR; 21	MEA; DNQ	CLE	MIS; 28	ROA; DNQ	POC; 32	MDO; DNQ	SAN; 19	MIS2; DNQ	PHX2; DNQ	LS; DNQ	CEA		**NC**	**0**	
1987	A. J. Foyt Enterprises	LBH	PHX	INDY; 7	MIL	POR	MEA	CLE	TOR	MIS	POC	ROA	MDO	NAZ	LS	MIA			**32nd**	**6**	
1988	A. J. Foyt Enterprises	PHX	LBH	INDY; 30	MIL	POR	CLE	TOR	MEA	MIS	POC	MDO	ROA	NAZ	LS	MIA			**48th**	**0**	
1989	A. J. Foyt Enterprises	PHX	LBH	INDY; DNQ	MIL	DET	POR	CLE	MEA	TOR	MIS	POC	MDO	ROA	NAZ	LS			NC	-	
1990	Kent Baker Racing	PHX	LBH	INDY; 33	MIL	DET	POR	CLE	MEA	TOR	MIS	DEN	VAN	MDO	ROA	NAZ	LS		**46th**	**0**	
1991	Hemelgarn Racing	SRF	LBH	PHX	INDY; 8	MIL	DET	POR	CLE	MEA	TOR	MIS	DEN	VAN	MDO	ROA	NAZ	LS	**24th**	**5**	
1992	Hemelgarn Racing	SRF	PHX	LBH	INDY; 27	DET	POR	MIL	NHM	TOR	MIS	CLE	ROA	VAN	MDO	NAZ	LS		**59th**	**0**	
1993	Hemelgarn Racing	SRF	PHX	LBH	INDY; 31	MIL	DET	POR	CLE	TOR	MIS	NHM	ROA	VAN	MDO	NAZ	LS		**54th**	**0**	
1994	Hemelgarn Racing	SRF	PHX	LBH	INDY; 13	MIL	DET	POR	CLE	TOR	MIS	MDO	NHM	VAN	ROA	NAZ	LS		**37th**	**0**	
1995	Hemelgarn Racing	MIA	SRF	PHX	LBH	NAZ	INDY; 30	MIL	DET	POR	ROA	TOR	CLE	MIS	MDO	NHM	VAN	LS	**46th**	**0**	

==== Indianapolis 500 ====
Year	Chassis	Engine	Start	Finish	Team
1984	March 83C	Cosworth DFX	Practice Crash		Pabst Racing
1987	March 86C	Cosworth DFX	26	7	A. J. Foyt Enterprises
1988	March 86C	Chevrolet V6	29	30	A. J. Foyt Enterprises
1989	March 86C	Chevrolet V6	DNQ		A. J. Foyt Enterprises
1990	Lola T87/00	Buick V6	27	33	Kent Baker Racing
1991	Lola T91/00	Buick V6	17	8	Hemelgarn Racing
1992	Lola T91/00	Buick V6	13	27	Hemelgarn Racing
1993	Lola T91/00	Buick V6	20	31	Hemelgarn Racing
1994	Reynard 94I	Ford-Cosworth XB	13	13	Hemelgarn Racing
1995	Reynard 95I	Ford-Cosworth XB	11	30	Hemelgarn Racing

=== NASCAR ===
(key) (Bold – Pole position awarded by qualifying time. Italics – Pole position earned by points standings or practice time. * – Most laps led.)

==== Winston Cup Series ====
NASCAR Winston Cup Series results
Year	Team	No.	Make	1	2	3	4	5	6	7	8	9	10	11	12	13	14	15	16	17	18	19	20	21	22	23	24	25	26	27	28	29	30	31	NWCC	Pts	Ref
1992	Folsom Racing	13	Chevy	DAY	CAR	RCH	ATL	DAR	BRI	NWS	MAR	TAL	CLT	DOV	SON	POC	MCH	DAY	POC	TAL; 36	GLN	MCH; 37	BRI	DAR	RCH	DOV	MAR	NWS	CLT	CAR	PHO	ATL			68th	107	
1993	Folsom Racing	31	Chevy	DAY	CAR	RCH	ATL	DAR	BRI	NWS	MAR	TAL	SON	CLT	DOV	POC	MCH	DAY; DNQ	NHA	POC	TAL	GLN	MCH	BRI	DAR	RCH	DOV	MAR	NWS	CLT	CAR				NA	-	
1993	Folsom Racing	13	Chevy																													PHO; DNQ	ATL		NA	-	
1994	Roulo Brothers Racing	09	Chevy	DAY	CAR	RCH	ATL	DAR	BRI	NWS	MAR	TAL	SON	CLT	DOV	POC	MCH	DAY	NHA	POC	TAL	IND; DNQ	GLN	MCH	BRI	DAR	RCH	DOV	MAR	NWS	CLT	CAR	PHO	ATL	NA	-	

==== SuperTruck Series ====
NASCAR SuperTruck Series results
Year	Team	No.	Make	1	2	3	4	5	6	7	8	9	10	11	12	13	14	15	16	17	18	19	20	NCTC	Pts	Ref
1995	Decuir Racing	10	Chevy	PHO	TUS; 30	SGS	MMR; 18	POR	EVG	I70	LVL	BRI	MLW	CNS	HPT	IRP	FLM	RCH	MAR	NWS	SON	MMR	PHO	67th	182	
