= Steve Chassey =

American racing driver

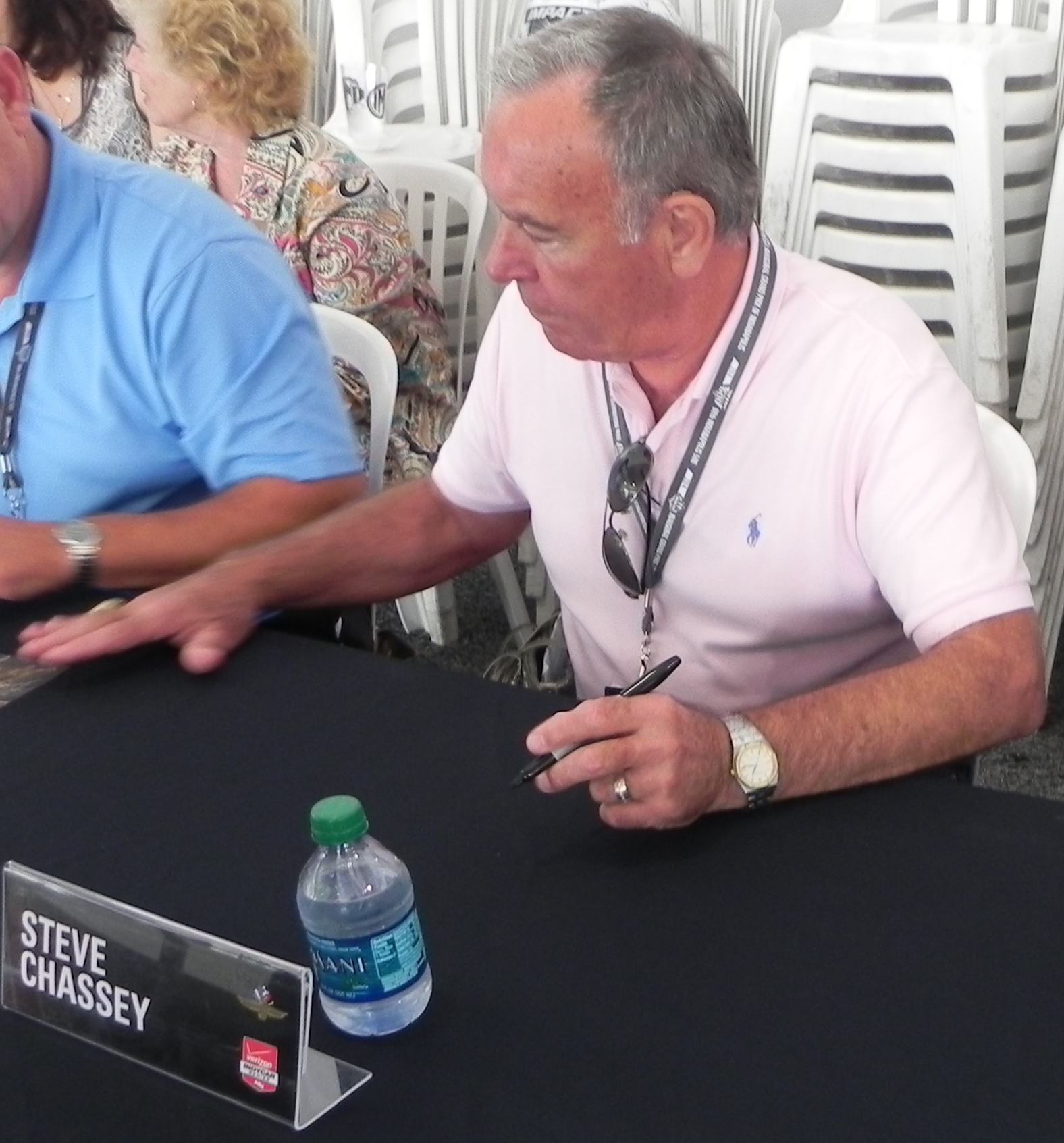
Chassey at the 2014 Indianapolis 500

Steve Chassey (born February 27, 1945, in Brockton, Massachusetts), is a former driver in the CART Championship Car series. He raced in nine seasons (1981, 1983–1989, and 1992), with 44 career starts, including the Indianapolis 500 in 1983, 1987, and 1988. He finished in the top-ten four times, with his best finish in fifth position in 1981 at Watkins Glen International. He raced his last Indy 500 in 1988 for Gary Trout Motorsports, finishing 24th. Chassey served in the 1st Cavalry Division during the Vietnam War, and was awarded the Soldier's Medal for his actions during a helicopter rescue.

Chassey was also a regular competitor in the USAC Silver Crown Series championship, racing from 1975 to 1992. He was runner-up in the 1980 season, and had two career wins, at the 1984 Hoosier Hundred and 1988 Tony Bettenhausen 100. After retiring from driving, he also worked for ESPN, commentating on Thursday night "Thunder" USAC events.

== American open–wheel racing results ==
(key)

=== PPG Indycar Series ===
(key) (Races in bold indicate pole position)

Year	Team	1	2	3	4	5	6	7	8	9	10	11	12	13	14	15	16	17	Rank	Points	Ref
1981	Jet Engineering	PHX; DNQ	MIL; 24	ATL; 23		MCH; 20	RIV; 15	MIL; 15	MCH; 12	WGL; 5	MEX	PHX; DNQ							**20th**	**31**	
1981	Alex Foods				ATL; 22														**20th**	**31**	
1982	Jet Engineering	PHX; DNQ	ATL	MIL	CLE	MCH	MIL	POC	RIV	ROA	MCH	PHX							—	0	
1983	Gohr Racing	ATL; 17	INDY; 11	MIL; 19	CLE; 22	MCH; 10	ROA; 6	POC; 25	RIV; 17	MDO	MCH	CPL; 12	LAG; 10	PHX; 19					**19th**	**17**	
1984	Gohr Racing	LBH; DNQ	PHX; DNQ	INDY; DNQ	MIL; DNQ	POR	MEA; DNQ	CLE; 16	MCH; 32	ROA; 24	POC; 22	MDO; 28	SAN	MCH; 20	PHX; DNQ	LAG; 16	CPL; DNQ		**NC**	**0**	
1985	Gohr Racing	LBH	INDY; DNQ	MIL; DNS	POR; DNQ	MEA; 20	CLE; DNS	MCH; 12	ROA; 26	POC; 11	MDO; 12	SAN	MCH; 14	LAG; 15	PHX; 11	MIA; DNQ			**34th**	**6**	
1986	Gohr Racing	PHX	LBH	INDY; DNQ	MIL; 17	POR	MEA	CLE	TOR	MCH; 28	POC	MDO	SAN						**NC**	**0**	
1986	Arciero Racing													MCH; 17	ROA	LAG	PHX	MIA	**NC**	**0**	
1987	United Oil	LBH	PHX	INDY; 25	MIL	POR	MEA	CLE	TOR	MCH	POC	ROA	MDO	NAZ	LAG	MIA			**NC**	**0**	
1988	Gary Trout Motorsports	PHX	LBH	INDY; 24	MIL	POR	CLE	TOR	MEA	MCH	POC	MDO	ROA	NAZ	LAG	MIA			**NC**	**0**	
1989	R. Kent Baker Racing	PHX	LBH	INDY; DNQ	MIL	DET	POR	CLE											**NC**	**0**	
1989	Bettenhausen Motorsports								MEA; 28	TOR	MCH; 29	POC	MDO	ROA	NAZ	LAG			**NC**	**0**	
1990	D.B. Mann Motorsports	PHX	LBH	INDY; DNQ	MIL	DET	POR	CLE	MEA	TOR	MCH	DEN	VAN	MDO	ROA	NAZ	LAG		—	0	
1992	Euromotorsport	SRF	PHX	LBH	INDY	DET	POR	MIL; 22	NHA; 19	TOR	MCH; 19	CLE	ROA	VAN	MDO	NAZ	LAG		**NC**	**0**	

=== Indy 500 results ===
Year	Chassis	Engine	Start	Finish
1981	Eagle	Chevrolet	Failed to Qualify	
1982	Rattlesnake	Cosworth	Practice Crash	
1983	Eagle	Chevrolet	19th	11th
1984	Eagle	Chevrolet	Qualifying Crash	
1985	March	Chevrolet	Failed to Qualify even after setting one and four lap records for normally aspirated push rod V-8 engines	
1986	March	Buick	Failed to Qualify	
1987	March	Cosworth	32nd	25th
1988	March	Cosworth	26th	24th
1989	March	Cosworth	Failed to Qualify	
1990	Lola	Buick	Practice Crash	
