= Arie Luyendyk =

Dutch racing driver (born 1953)

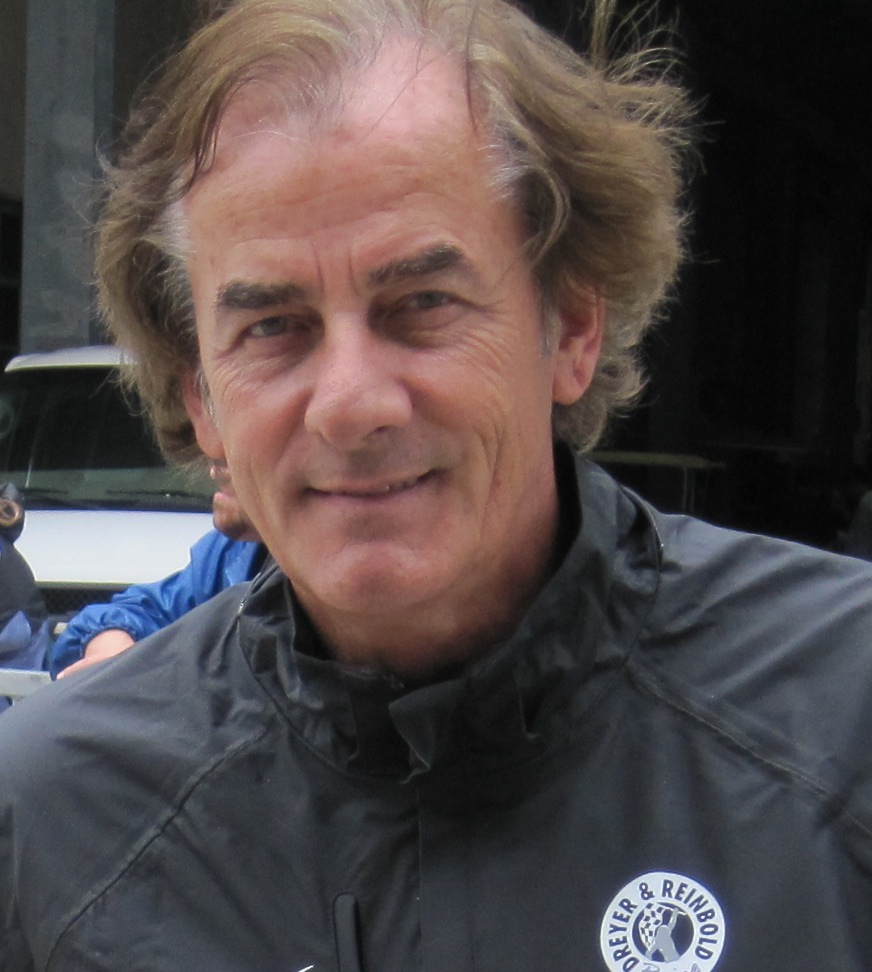
- Luyendyk in 2010
- Born: Arie Luijendijk; 21 September 1953 (age 73) Sommelsdijk, South Holland, Netherlands
- Relatives: Arie Luyendyk Jr. (son)

Championship titles
- Major victories 12 Hours of Sebring (1989); Indianapolis 500 (1990, 1997); 24 Hours of Daytona (1998)

Awards
- 1996–97, 1998: Indycar Series Most Popular Driver

Champ Car career
- 141 races run over 13 years
- Best finish: 6th (1991)
- First race: 1984 Provimi Veal 200 (Road America)
- Last race: 1997 Marlboro 500 (Fontana)
- First win: 1990 Indianapolis 500 (Indianapolis)
- Last win: 1991 Bosch Spark Plug Grand Prix (Nazareth)
Wins	Podiums	Poles
3	13	1

IndyCar Series career
- 28 races run over 7 years
- Best finish: 6th (1997)
- First race: 1996 Indy 200 at Walt Disney World (Orlando)
- Last race: 2002 Michigan Indy 400 (Michigan)
- First win: 1996 Dura Lube 200 (Phoenix)
- Last win: 1998 Las Vegas 500K (Las Vegas)
Wins	Podiums	Poles
4	5	4

24 Hours of Le Mans career
- Years: 1989
- Teams: Nissan
- Best finish: DNF (1989)
- Class wins: 0

Arie Luijendijk (anglicized as Arie Luyendyk; born 21 September 1953), nicknamed "The Flying Dutchman," is a Dutch former auto racing driver, and winner of the 1990 and 1997 Indianapolis 500 races. He was inducted into the Indianapolis Motor Speedway Hall of Fame in 2009, and the Motorsports Hall of Fame of America in 2014.

Luyendyk won a total of seven Indy car races, including three in the CART series, all of them on ovals.

== Career ==
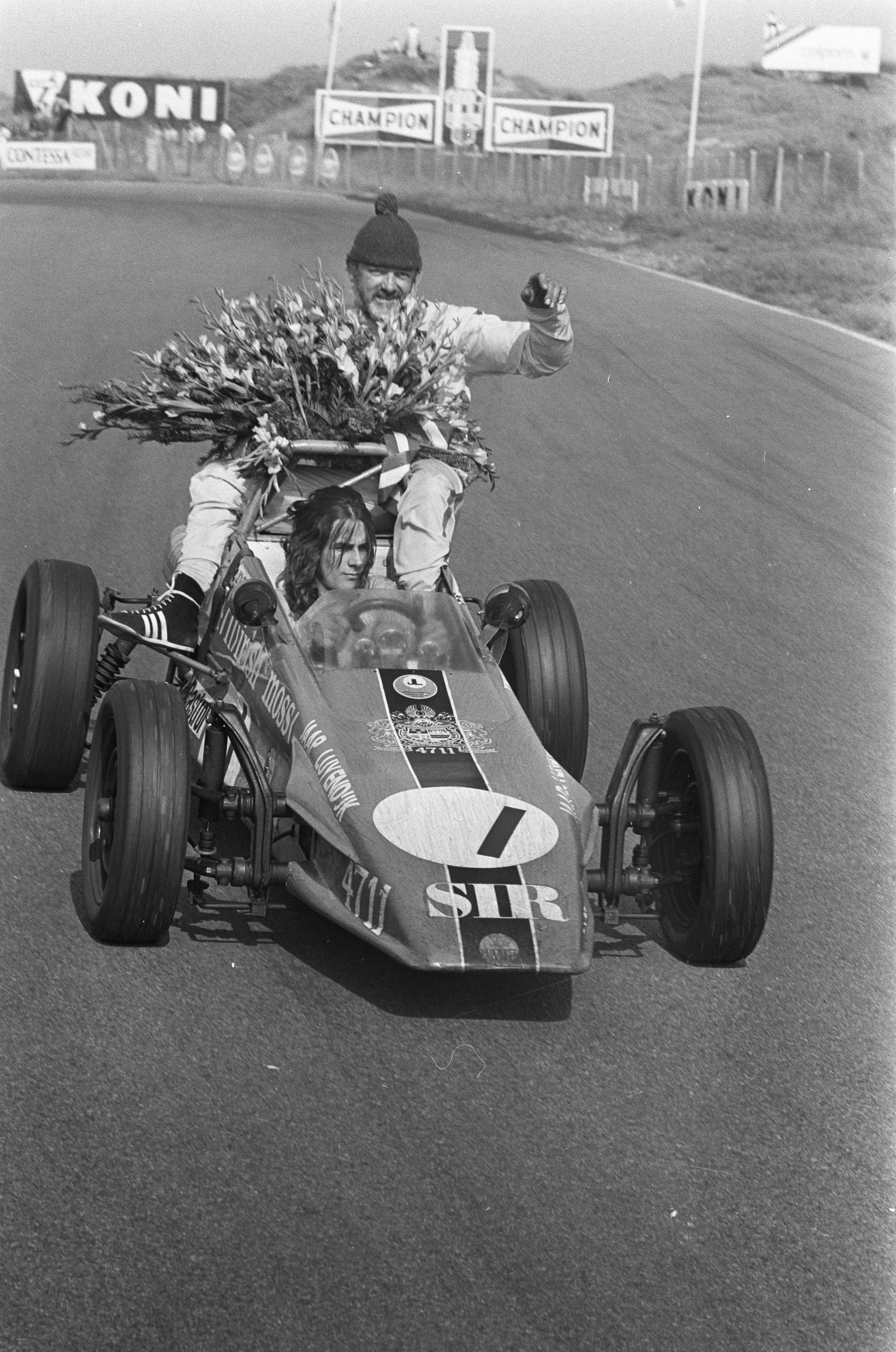
Arie driving his fathers car at Zandvoort after his father, Jaap, won the European Formula Vee championship in 1972.

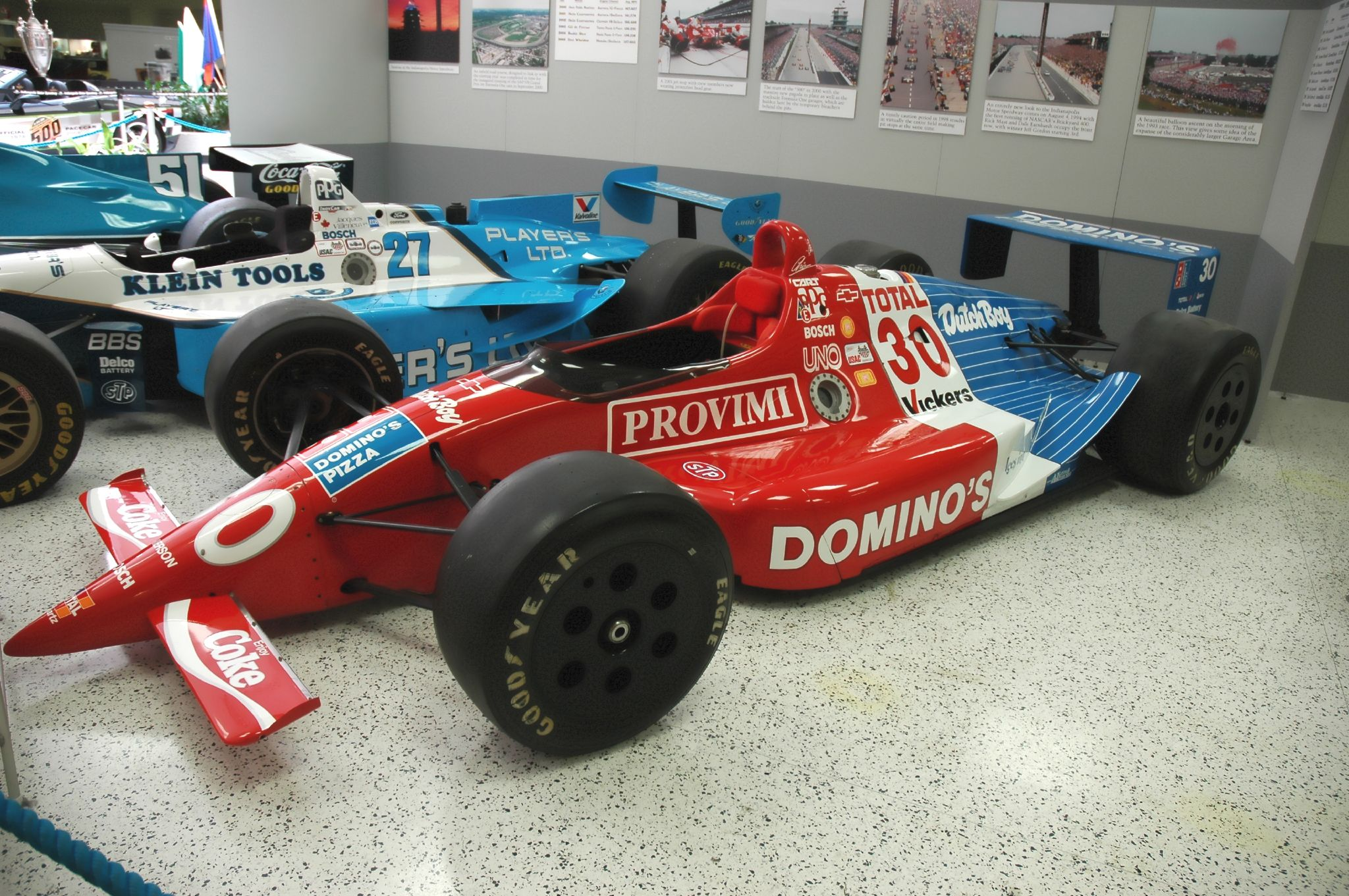
Luyendyk's Lola-Chevrolet which won the 1990 Indianapolis 500 for Doug Shierson Racing.

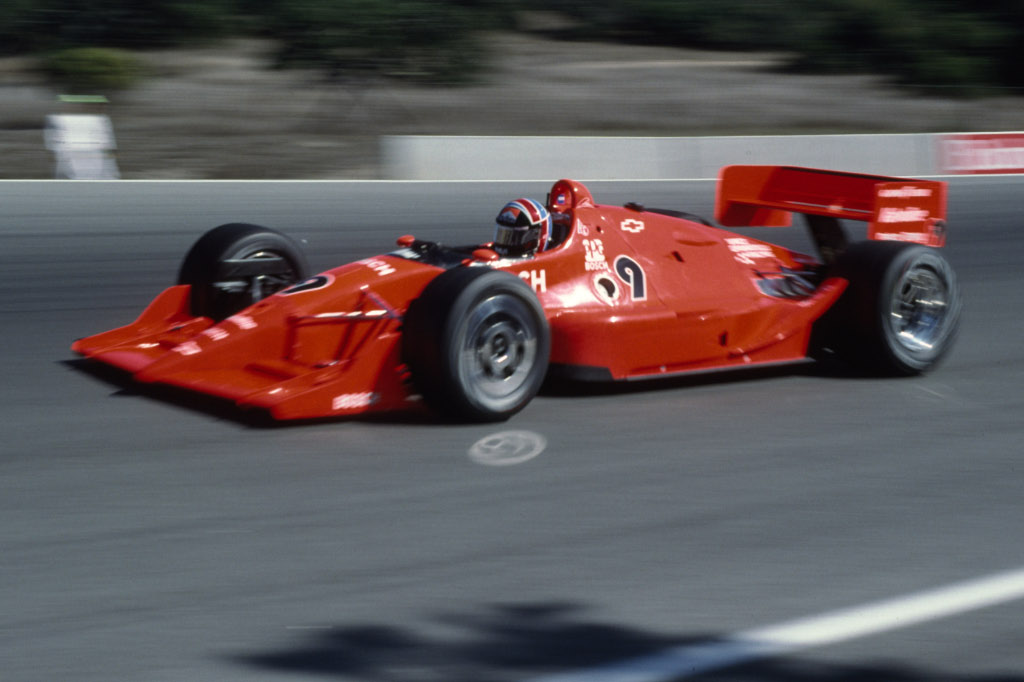
Luyendyk in 1991, driving for Vince Granatelli Racing.

Luyendyk started racing in the early 1970s, winning a number of Dutch national titles. In 1977, he won the European Super Vee championship, and switched to Formula Three. Further success eluded him until he moved to the United States in 1984, where he immediately won the Super Vee championship.

With the help of sponsor Provimi Veal, Luyendyk ran his first full Champ Car season in 1985, winning the rookie of the year title both for the season and the Indianapolis 500. Gaining additional sponsorship from Domino's Pizza (and changing his racing number to 30, as at the time Domino's guaranteed customers that delivery orders would arrive in thirty minutes or less), his first win in the series came five years later in 1990, at the most important race in the series, with a record average speed of 185.981 mph (299.307 km/h). Luyendyk won the 1990 Indianapolis 500 for Doug Shierson Racing. His average speed record, which stood for 23 years, was finally broken in the 2013 97th Indianapolis 500 by Tony Kanaan with an average speed of 187.433 mph (301.644 km/h).

Luyendyk continued to perform well at Indianapolis, scoring pole positions in 1993, 1997 and 1999, and retiring from the race while leading on three occasions. In 1995, Luyendyk controlled the race early until an incident with Scott Sharp put him several laps down. For the rest of the race, Luyendyk was able to make up all his laps and barely beat eventual winner Jacques Villeneuve at the stripe to get his final lap back and finish on the lead lap.

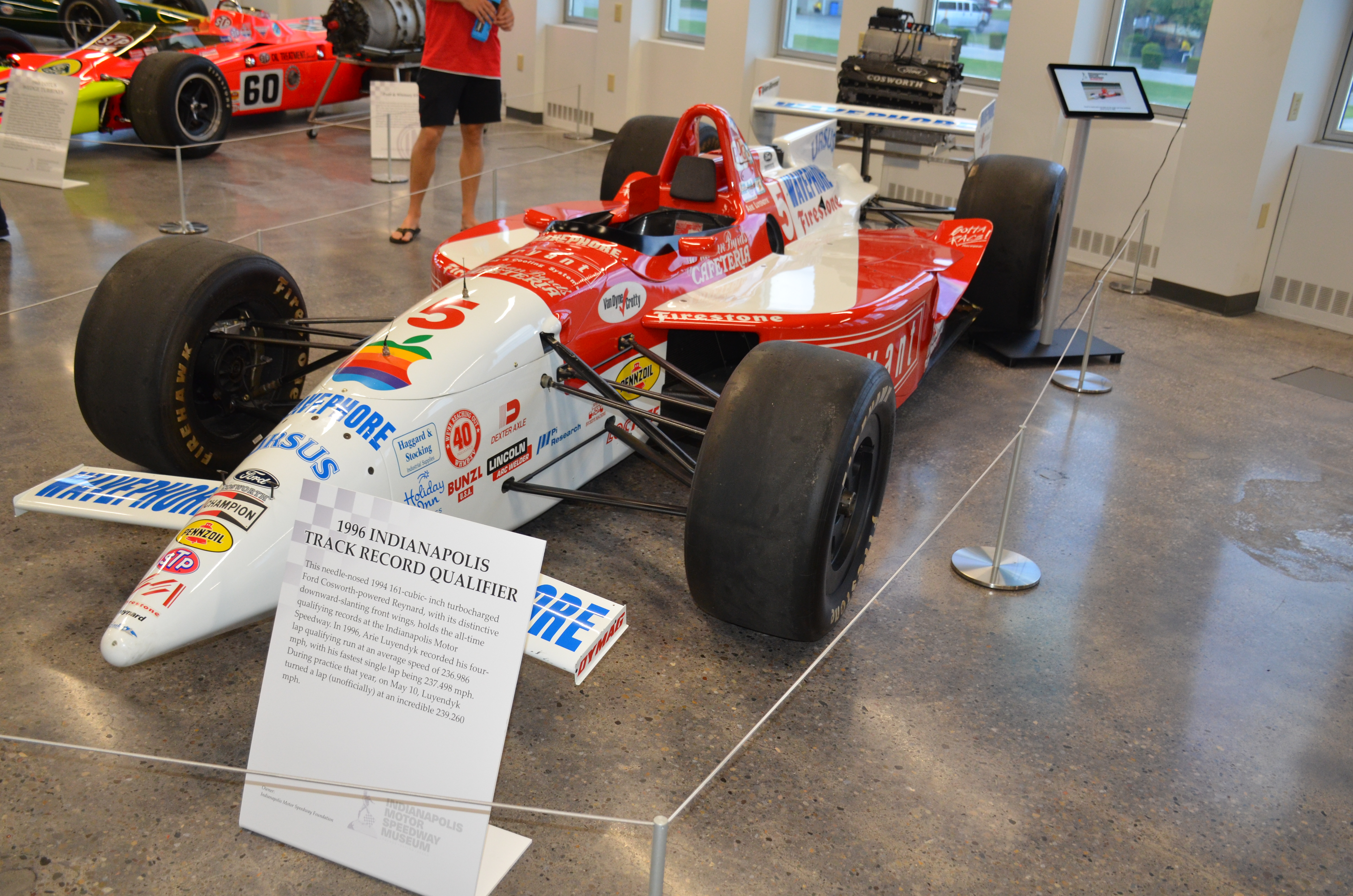
Luyendyk's track record setting Reynard 94I.

In 1996, Luyendyk set the qualifying lap record at 237.498 mph (382.216 km/h), although he did not start on the pole because he qualified on the second day of time trials. He won the 1997 Indianapolis 500 from the pole over Treadway Racing teammate Scott Goodyear. The race ended in controversy when on the final restart the white and green flag waved to end a caution but the yellow lights stayed on with Luyendyk pulling away to the win while the other competitors were confused. A similar finish involving a similar mistake almost took away a win from Luyendyk two weeks later.

At the 1997 True Value 500 at Texas, a scoring error by the USAC resulted in Billy Boat being declared the race winner. Luyendyk protested in front of victory lane, only to be slapped by Boat's team owner A. J. Foyt. Following the incident, Foyt and Luyendyk were fined US$20,000 and US$14,000 respectively, for unsportsmanlike behaviour. IndyCar officials reviewed the race tape and discovered that Luyendyk had actually finished on a lap by himself and completed more laps than the scheduled race distance, thus he was declared the official winner. Because Foyt refused to surrender the trophy, a duplicate was awarded to Luyendyk.

Luyendyk also was selected to participate in the 1992, 1993, and 1998 editions of the International Race of Champions.

After his terrific run in 1997, Luyendyk only won one race in the following season and had several races where he didn't finish the full distance. After 1998, Luyendyk decided to cut down to a part-time schedule, only racing in the 1999 Indianapolis 500 where he won the pole and dropped out because of a crash. He retired from racing after the 1999 season, and for a short time, joined ABC Sports as a color commentator. He returned to the Indy 500 in 2001 and 2002. In 2003, he entered at Indianapolis for the final time. He suffered a crash during practice, and did not make an attempt to qualify.

Other Luyendyk victories include the 24 Hours of Daytona and the 12 Hours of Sebring. His son, Arie Jr., is an off-road and Indy Lights racer.

The last corner of the Zandvoort track in the Netherlands carries his name. In 1999, he was presented with the Sagamore of the Wabash award, reflecting upon his Indy 500 career. In 2016, Luyendyk was selected as a chief steward for the IndyCar Series alongside fellow racer Max Papis and Dan Davis.

== Motorsports career results ==
=== Complete European F5000 Championship results ===
(key) (Races in bold indicate pole position; races in italics indicate fastest lap.)

Year	Entrant	Chassis	Engine	1	2	3	4	5	6	7	8	9	10	11	12	13	14	15	16	17	18	Pos.	Pts
1973	Tony Trimmer	McLaren M18	Chevrolet 5.0 V8	BRH	MAL	SIL	SNE	BRH	OUL	MAL	MIS	MAL	MON	SIL	BRH	OUL	JYL	ZAN; 10	SNE	BRH; 14		31st	1
1974	Anglo-American Racing Team	Chevron B24	Chevrolet 5.0 V8	BRH	MAL	SIL	OUL	BRH	ZOL	THR	ZAN; 11	MUG	MNZ	MAL	MON	THR	BRH	OUL	SNE	MAL	BRH	NC	0

=== Complete European Formula Two Championship results ===
(key) (Races in bold indicate pole position; races in italics indicate fastest lap)

Year	Entrant	Chassis	Engine	1	2	3	4	5	6	7	8	9	10	11	12	Pos.	Pts
1979	RAM Autoracing	Chevron B48	BMW	SIL	HOC	THR	NÜR	VAL	MUG	PAU	HOC	ZAN; 13	PER	MIS	DON	NC	0

=== Complete European Formula 3 results ===
(key) (Races in bold indicate pole position) (Races in italics indicate fastest lap)

Year	Team	Engine	1	2	3	4	5	6	7	8	9	10	11	12	13	14	15	16	DC	pts
1978	Racing Team Holland	Toyota	ZAN; 6	NÜR; DNS	ÖST; 6	ZOL; 5	IMO; DNQ	NÜR; 5	DIJ; DNQ	MNZ; DNQ	PER; Ret	MAG; 6	KNU; 5	KAR; 9	DON; 15	KAS; 22	JAR; Ret	VLL; 12	12th	9
1979	Racing Team Holland	Toyota	VLL; 16	ÖST; 19	**ZOL**; 13	MAG; 2	DON; Ret	ZAN; 26	PER	MNZ; 16	KNU; 9	KIN; Ret	JAR; 7	KAS; Ret					6th	13
1980	Racing Team Holland	Toyota	NÜR	ÖST	ZOL; 20	MAG	ZAN; 7	LAC	MUG	MNZ	MIS	KNU	SIL	JAR	KAS	ZOL			NC	0

=== American open-wheel racing ===
(key) (Races in bold indicate pole position; races in italics indicate fastest lap.)

==== Formula Super Vee ====
Year	Team	Chassis	Engine	1	2	3	4	5	6	7	8	9	10	11	12	Rank	Points
1984	Provimi Veal	Ralt RT5/84	VW Brabham	LBH; 2	**PHX**; Ret	**MIL**; 1	POR; 3	MEA; 3	**CLE**; 1	ROA; 2	WGI; 1	CTR; 1	MCH; 2	LS; Ret	CPL; 2	**1st**	**172**

==== CART PPG World Series ====
Year	Team	Chassis	Engine	1	2	3	4	5	6	7	8	9	10	11	12	13	14	15	16	17	Pos.	Pts	Ref
1984	Bettenhausen Motorsports	March 84C	Cosworth DFX V8t	LBH	PHX	INDY	MIL	POR	MEA	CLE	MCH	ROA; 8	POC	MDO	SAN	MCH	PHX	LAG	CPL		32nd	5	
1985	Provimi Veal Racing	Lola T900	Cosworth DFX V8t	LBH; 17	INDY; 7	MIL; 17	POR; 21	MEA; 10	CLE; 5	MCH; Wth	ROA; 6	POC	MDO; DNS	SAN; 18	MCH; 15	LAG; 22	PHX; 25	MIA; 7			18th	33	
1986	Provimi Veal Racing	Lola T86/00	Cosworth DFX V8t	PHX; 6	LBH; 15	INDY; 15	MIL; 9	POR								MCH; 13				MIA; 21	17th	29	
1986	Provimi Veal Racing	March 86C	Cosworth DFX V8t						MEA; 16	CLE; 24	TOR; 6	MCH; 23	POC; 17	MDO; 18	SAN		ROA; 7	LAG; 10	PHX; 15		17th	29	
1987	Hemelgarn Racing	March 87C	Cosworth DFX V8t	LBH; 14	PHX; 3	INDY; 18	MIL; 4	POR; 16	MEA; 6	CLE; 19	TOR; 7	MCH; 5	POC; 4	ROA; 4	MDO; 11	NAZ; 4	LAG; 6	MIA; 11			7th	98	
1988	Dick Simon Racing	Lola T88/00	Cosworth DFX V8t	PHX; 9	LBH; 10	INDY; 10	MIL; 15	POR; 2	CLE; 18	TOR; 20	MEA; 20	MCH; 28	POC; 26	MDO; 25	ROA; 19	NAZ; 9	LAG; 22	MIA; 14			14th	31	
1989	Dick Simon Racing	Lola T89/00	Cosworth DFS V8t	PHX; 17	LBH; 7	INDY; 21	MIL; 6	DET; 6	POR; 3	CLE; 9	MEA; 7	TOR; 24	MCH; 6	POC; 23	MDO; 8	ROA; 4	NAZ; 13	LAG; 9			10th	75	
1990	Doug Shierson Racing	Lola T90/00	Chevrolet 265A V8t	PHX; 9	LBH; 7	INDY; 1	MIL; 19	DET; 5	POR; 6	CLE; 6	MEA; 4	TOR; 5	MCH; 19	DEN; 13	VAN; 26	MDO; 21	ROA; 6	NAZ; 17	LAG; 9		8th	90	
1991	Vince Granatelli Racing	Lola T91/00	Chevrolet 265A V8t	SRF; 9	LBH; 5	PHX; 1	INDY; 3	MIL; 17	DET; 3	POR; 7	CLE; 5	MEA; 18	TOR; 19	MCH; 2	DEN; 22	VAN; 19	MDO; 9	ROA; 5	NAZ; 1	LAG; 8	6th	134	
1992	Chip Ganassi Racing	Lola T92/00	Ford XB V8t	SRF	PHX	LBH	INDY; 15	DET	POR	MIL	NHA	TOR	MCH; 14	CLE	ROA	VAN	MDO	NAZ	LAG		41st	0	
1993	Chip Ganassi Racing	Lola T93/00	Ford XB V8t	SRF; 5	PHX; 6	LBH; 11	**INDY**; 2	MIL; 22	DET; 17	POR; 10	CLE; 10	TOR; 22	MCH; 3	NHA; 25	ROA; 9	VAN; 25	MDO; 5	NAZ; 8	LAG; 3		8th	90	
1994	Indy Regency Racing	Lola T94/00	Ilmor 265D V8t	SRF; 25	PHX; 22	LBH; 11	INDY; 18	MIL; 21	DET; 19	POR; 14	CLE; 21	TOR; 31	MCH; 2	MDO; 13	NHA; 27	VAN; 6	ROA; 22	NAZ; 26	LAG; 6		17th	34	
1995	Dick Simon Racing	Lola T95/00	Ford XB V8t	MIA	SRF	PHX; 25	LBH	NAZ													26th	6	
1995	Team Menard	Lola T95/00	Menard V6t						INDY; 7	MIL	DET	POR	ROA	TOR	CLE	MCH	MDO	NHA	VAN	LAG	26th	6	
1997	Target Chip Ganassi	Reynard 97i	Honda HRR V8t	MIA	SRF	LBH	NAZ	RIO	GAT	MIL	DET	POR	CLE	TOR	MCH	MDO	ROA	VAN	LAG	FON; 24	34th	0	

==== IndyCar Series ====
Year	Team	Chassis	No.	Engine	1	2	3	4	5	6	7	8	9	10	11	12	13	14	15	16	Pos.	Pts	Ref
1996	Byrd-Treadway Racing	Reynard 94I/95I	5	Ford XB V8t	WDW; 14	**PHX**; 1	INDY; 16														7th	225	
1996–97	Byrd-Treadway Racing	Reynard 94I/95I	5	Ford XB V8t	NHA; 13	**LVS**; 20															6th	223	
1996–97	Byrd-Treadway Racing	G-Force GF01	5	Oldsmobile Aurora V8			WDW; 12	PHX; 22	**INDY**; 1	TXS; 1	PPR; 15	CLT; 21	NHA; 3	LVS; 25							6th	223	
1998	Byrd-Treadway Racing	G-Force GF01B	5	Oldsmobile Aurora V8	WDW; 8	PHX; 24	INDY; 20	TXS; 13	NHA; 5	DOV; 9	CLT; 4	PPR; 22	ATL; 8	TXS; 28	LVS; 1						8th	227	
1999	Treadway Racing	G-Force GF01C	5	Oldsmobile Aurora V8	WDW	PHX	CLT	**INDY**; 22	TXS	PPR	ATL	DOV	PPR	LVS	TXS						41st	11	
2001	Treadway-Hubbard Racing	G-Force GF05B	5	Oldsmobile Aurora V8	PHX	HMS	ATL	INDY; 13	TXS	PPR	RIR	KAN	NSH	KTY	GAT	CHI	TXS				41st	17	
2002	Treadway Racing	G-Force GF05B	55	Chevrolet Indy V8	HMS	PHX	FON	NAZ	INDY; 14	TXS	PPR	RIR	KAN	NSH	MCH; 16	KTY	GAT	CHI	TXS		37th	30	
2003	Mo Nunn Racing	G-Force GF09	20	Toyota Indy V8	HMS	PHX	MOT	INDY; Wth^{1}	TXS	PPR	RIR	KAN	NSH	MCH	GAT	KTY	NAZ	CHI	FON	TXS	NA	-	

^{1} Luyendyk was listed as the primary entry and participated in practice; during practice, Luyendyk crashed, and decided to sit out the race due to injuries. Alex Barron replaced him in the car.

===== Indianapolis 500 =====
Year	Chassis	Engine	Start	Finish	Team
1985	Lola	Cosworth	20	7	Provimi Veal Racing
1986	Lola	Cosworth	19	15	Provimi Veal Racing
1987	March	Cosworth	7	18	Hemelgarn Racing
1988	Lola	Cosworth	6	10	Dick Simon Racing
1989	Lola	Cosworth	15	21	Dick Simon Racing
1990	Lola	Chevrolet	3	**1**	Doug Shierson Racing
1991	Lola	Chevrolet	14	3	Vince Granatelli Racing
1992	Lola	Ford-Cosworth	4	15	Chip Ganassi Racing
1993	Lola	Ford-Cosworth	**1**	2	Chip Ganassi Racing
1994	Lola	Ilmor	8	18	Indy Regency Racing
1995	Lola	Menard	2	7	Team Menard
1996	Reynard	Ford-Cosworth	20	16	Byrd-Treadway Racing
1997	G-Force	Oldsmobile	**1**	**1**	Treadway Racing
1998	G-Force	Oldsmobile	28	20	Treadway Racing
1999	G-Force	Oldsmobile	**1**	22	Treadway Racing
2001	G-Force	Oldsmobile	6	13	Treadway-Hubbard Racing
2002	G-Force	Chevrolet	24	14	Treadway Racing
2003	G-Force	Toyota	Wth		Mo Nunn Racing

=== 24 Hours of Le Mans results ===
Year	Team	Co-Drivers	Car	Class	Laps	Pos.	Class Pos.
1989	(Japan) Nissan Motorsport	(Australia) Geoff Brabham (United States) Chip Robinson	Nissan R89C	C1	250	DNF	DNF

=== International Race of Champions ===
(key) (Bold – Pole position. * – Most laps led.)

International Race of Champions results
Year	Make	1	2	3	4	Pos.	Points	Ref
1992	Dodge	DAY; 10	TAL; 11	MCH; 11	**MCH**; 10	12th	21	
1993	Dodge	DAY; 6	DAR	**TAL**; 10	MCH; 8	11th	24.5	
1998	Pontiac	DAY; 5	CAL; 11	MCH; 7	IND; 11	12th	26	

Sporting positions
Preceded by Ed Pimm	US Formula Super Vee; Champion; 1984	Succeeded by Ken Johnson
Preceded by Roberto Guerrero; Michael Andretti	Indianapolis 500 Rookie of the Year; 1985	Succeeded by Randy Lanier
Preceded by Roberto Guerrero	CART Rookie of the Year; 1985	Succeeded by Chip Robinson
Preceded by Emerson Fittipaldi; Buddy Lazier	Indianapolis 500 Winner; 1990; 1997	Succeeded by Rick Mears; Eddie Cheever
Awards and achievements
Preceded by Davey Hamilton	Scott Brayton Award; 2002	Succeeded by Buddy Lazier
