= 1984 CART PPG Indy Car World Series =

American motorsport season

1984 CART season
- PPG Indy Car World Series

Season
- Races: 16
- Start date: March 31
- End date: November 10

Awards
- Drivers' champion: (United States) Mario Andretti
- Constructors' Cup: (United Kingdom) March
- Manufacturers' Cup: (United Kingdom) Cosworth
- Nations' Cup: United States
- Rookie of the Year: (Colombia) Roberto Guerrero
- Indianapolis 500 winner: (United States) Rick Mears

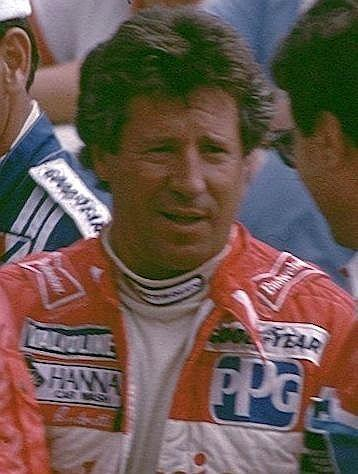
Mario Andretti, champion of the 1984 season

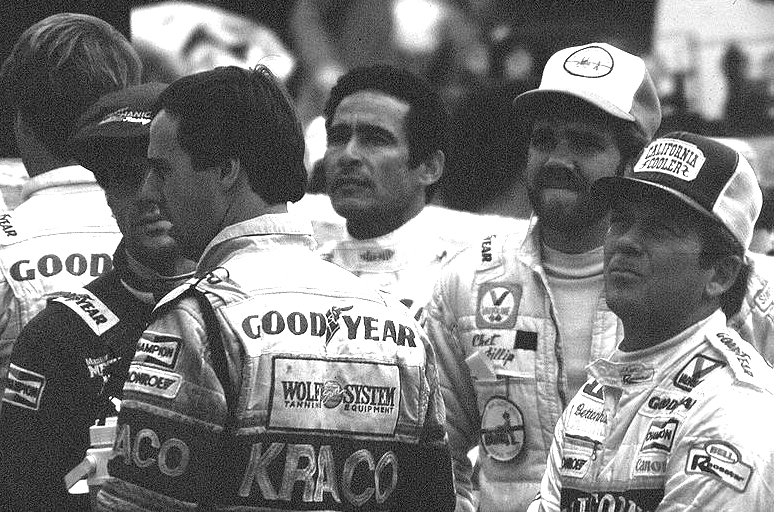
Guerrero, Brabham, Ongais, Fillip, and Bettenhausen at Pocono in 1984

The 1984 CART PPG Indy Car World Series season, the sixth in the CART era of U.S. open-wheel racing, consisted of 16 races, beginning in Long Beach, California on March 31 and concluding in Las Vegas, Nevada on November 10. The PPG Indy Car World Series Drivers' Champion was Mario Andretti and the Indianapolis 500 winner was Rick Mears. Rookie of the Year was Roberto Guerrero. The 68th Indianapolis 500 was sanctioned by the USAC, but counted in the CART points standings.

== Drivers and constructors ==
The following teams and drivers competed for the 1984 PPG Indy Car World Series. Number in parentheses ( ) is the number used at Indianapolis only.

Team	Chassis	Engine	#	Drivers	Rounds
(United States) Team Penske	Penske PC-12 (1-2); March (3-16)	Cosworth	1 (2)	(United States) Al Unser	All
(United States) Team Penske	Penske PC-12 (1-2); March (3-16)	Cosworth	6	(United States) Rick Mears	1-11
(United States) Team Penske	Penske PC-12 (1-2); March (3-16)	Cosworth	6	(United States) Johnny Rutherford	12-14
(United States) Team Penske	Penske PC-12 (1-2); March (3-16)	Cosworth	6	(New Zealand) Mike Thackwell	15-16
(United States) Newman/Haas Racing	Lola	Cosworth	3	(United States) Mario Andretti	All
(United States) Mayer Racing	March	Cosworth	4(1)	(United States) Tom Sneva	All
(United States) Mayer Racing	March	Cosworth	41	(United States) Howdy Holmes	All
(United States) Gilmore Racing	March	Cosworth	4	(United States) George Snider	3
(United States) Gilmore Racing	March	Cosworth	14	(United States) A. J. Foyt	3, 6, 8, 10, 13-14, 16
(United States) Gilmore Racing	March	Cosworth	84	(United States) Johnny Rutherford	3, 8, 10
(United States) Truesports	March	Cosworth	5	(United States) Bobby Rahal	All
(United States) Galles Racing	March	Cosworth	7	(United States) Al Unser Jr.	All
(United States) Galles Racing	March	Cosworth	77	(United States) Tom Gloy	3, 6-7
(United States) Galles Racing	March	Cosworth	77	(United States) Pancho Carter	8, 10, 16
(United States) VDS Racing	Penske	Cosworth	8(12)	(United States) John Paul Jr.	1-3
(United States) VDS Racing	VDS	Cosworth	38	(United States) Chet Fillip	3, 8, 10-11, 13
(United States) Bignotti-Cotter Racing	March	Cosworth	9	(Colombia) Roberto Guerrero	All
(United States) American Dream Racing	March	Cosworth	10	(United States) Pancho Carter	3
(United States) American Dream Racing	March	Cosworth	69	(United States) Phil Caliva	1, 3
(United States) American Dream Racing	March	Cosworth	70	(United States) Roger Mears	1-2
(United States) Arciero Racing	Penske (1-4); March (5-15); Arciero (16)	Cosworth	11	(United States) Pete Halsmer	All except 7-9
(United States) Alsup Racing	Longhorn	Chevrolet	15	(United States) Bill Tempero	1
(United States) Alsup Racing	March (1-3); Argo (7-8, 10, 12)	Cosworth	27	(United States) Bill Alsup	1-3, 7-8, 10, 12
(United States) Provimi Veal Racing	March	Cosworth	16	(United States) Tony Bettenhausen Jr.	1-3, 8, 10
(United States) Provimi Veal Racing	March	Cosworth	16	(Netherlands) Arie Luyendyk	9
(United States) Provimi Veal Racing	March	Cosworth	16	(Republic of Ireland) Derek Daly	11-12
(United States) Provimi Veal Racing	March	Cosworth	17(61)	(Republic of Ireland) Derek Daly	1-10, 13
(United States) Provimi Veal Racing	March	Cosworth	17(61)	(United States) John Paul Jr.	14-16
(United States) Kraco Racing	March	Cosworth	18	(Australia) Geoff Brabham	All
(United States) Kraco Racing	March	Cosworth	99	(United States) Michael Andretti	All
(United States) Patrick Racing	March	Cosworth	20	(United States) Gordon Johncock	All except 15
(United States) Patrick Racing	March (3, 5-16); Wildcat (1-2, 4)	Cosworth	40	(United States) Chip Ganassi	1-8
(United States) Patrick Racing	March (3, 5-16); Wildcat (1-2, 4)	Cosworth	40	(United States) John Paul Jr.	9
(United States) Patrick Racing	March (3, 5-16); Wildcat (1-2, 4)	Cosworth	40	(United States) Pancho Carter	14
(United States) Patrick Racing	March (3, 5-16); Wildcat (1-2, 4)	Cosworth	40	(Italy) Bruno Giacomelli	15
(United States) Patrick Racing	March (3, 5-16); Wildcat (1-2, 4)	Cosworth	40	(Brazil) Emerson Fittipaldi	11-13, 16
(United States) Alex Morales Motorsports	March	Cosworth	21	(United States) Al Holbert	All
(United States) Alex Morales Motorsports	March	Cosworth	71	(United States) Rich Vogler	3
(United States) Dick Simon Racing	March	Cosworth	22	(United States) Dick Simon	All
(United States) Dick Simon Racing	March	Cosworth	23	(United States) Bill Puterbaugh	3
(United States) Dick Simon Racing	March	Cosworth	23	(United States) Mike Nish	14, 16
(United States) Leader Card Racing	March	Cosworth	24	(United States) Stan Fox	All except 1-2, 7, and 16
(United States) Leader Card Racing	March	Cosworth	24	(United States) Gary Bettenhausen	7
(United States) Interscope Racing	March	Cosworth	25	(United States) Danny Ongais	All except 9 and 11
(United States) Menard Racing	March	Cosworth	28	(United States) Herm Johnson	3-4
(United States) Doug Shierson Racing	DSR-1 (1-2, 4); Lola (3, 5-16)	Cosworth	30	(United States) Danny Sullivan	All
(United States) Doug Shierson Racing	DSR-1	Cosworth	80	(United States) Willy T. Ribbs	3
(United States) Hess Racing	Eagle (1-6, 8-11, 15) March (7)	Cosworth	31 (51)	(United States) Dick Ferguson	1-11, 15
(United States) Forsythe Racing	March	Cosworth	33	(Italy) Teo Fabi	1-7
(United States) Forsythe Racing	March	Cosworth	33	(United States) Kevin Cogan	8-10
(United States) Forsythe Racing	March	Cosworth	33	(Italy) Corrado Fabi	11-12, 14, 16
(United States) Forsythe Racing	March	Cosworth	33	(United Kingdom) Kenny Acheson	15
(United States) Wysard Racing	March	Cosworth	34	(South Africa) Desiré Wilson	1
(United States) Wysard Racing	March	Cosworth	34	(United States) Johnny Parsons	3
(United States) Wysard Racing	March	Cosworth	34	(United States) Randy Lewis	15-16
(United States) Wysard Racing	March	Cosworth	54	(United States) Price Cobb	3
(United States) Brayton Racing	March	Buick	35	(United States) Patrick Bedard	3
(United States) Brayton Racing	March	Buick (3-5, 9); Cosworth (6-8, 10-16)	37	(United States) Scott Brayton	3-16
(United States) Pace Racing	March	Cosworth	36	(United States) Chuck Ciprich	2-3
(United States) Pace Racing	March	Cosworth	36	(United States) Gary Bettenhausen	13-14
(United States) Pace Racing	March	Cosworth	36	(United States) Herm Johnson	11
(United States) Pace Racing	March	Cosworth	36	(Australia) Dennis Firestone	8-9, 12, 15-16
(United States) Pace Racing	March	Cosworth	36	(New Zealand) Graham McRae	6-7
(United States) Theodore Racing	Theodore	Cosworth	44(52)	(Italy) Bruno Giacomelli	1-3
(United States) Theodore Racing	Theodore	Cosworth	49	(Peru) Jorge Koechlin	3
(United States) AMI Racing	March	Cosworth	44	(United States) Greg Leffler	3
(United States) Dale Coyne Racing	Eagle	Chevrolet	45	(United States) Jim McElreath	2
(United States) Dale Coyne Racing	Eagle	Chevrolet	45	(United States) Tom Bigelow	4
(United States) Dale Coyne Racing	Eagle	Chevrolet	45	(United States) Dale Coyne	5-9, 11, 14-15
(United States) GTS Racing	March	Cosworth	47	(Brazil) Emerson Fittipaldi	1-3
(United States) GTS Racing	March	Cosworth	47	(Spain) José Romero	5
(United States) GTS Racing	March	Cosworth	47	(United Kingdom) Kenny Acheson	6
(United States) GTS Racing	March	Cosworth	86	(United States) Al Loquasto	3
(United States) Purcell Racing	March	Cosworth	50	(Australia) Dennis Firestone	3
(United States) Machinists Union Racing	Penske (1-2); March (3-16)	Cosworth	55	(Mexico) Josele Garza	All
(United States) Machinists Union Racing	Penske	Cosworth	76	(United States) Roger Mears	3
(United States) Gohr Racing	Eagle (1, 3); March (All others)	Chevrolet	56	(United States) Steve Chassey	All except 5, 12, and 14
(United States) Indy Auto Racing	March	Cosworth	57	(United States) Spike Gehlhausen	3, 7-8
(United States) Indy Auto Racing	March	Cosworth	57	(United States) Brad Murphey	11
(United States) Ellme Racing	March	Cosworth	58(85)	(United States) Phil Krueger	3, 8
(United States) Ellme Racing	March	Cosworth	58(85)	(United States) Steve Hostetler	5-7, 11, 15-1
(United States) McCray Racing	Penske	Cosworth	59	(United States) Johnny Parsons	1-2
(United States) McCray Racing	Penske	Cosworth	59	(United States) Jerry Karl	3, 10
(United States) McCray Racing	Penske	Cosworth	59	(United States) Randy Lewis	6-7, 9
(United States) McCray Racing	Penske	Cosworth	59	(United States) Peter Kuhn	11-13, 15
(United States) Renaissance Racing	Wildcat (3); March (13)	Cosworth	62	(United States) Jerry Karl	3, 13
(United States) Jet Engineering	March	Cosworth (10); Chevrolet (All except 10)	64	(United States) Ed Pimm	1-8
(United States) Jet Engineering	March	Cosworth (10); Chevrolet (All except 10)	64	(United States) Bill Tempero	9
(United States) Jet Engineering	March	Cosworth (10); Chevrolet (All except 10)	64	(United States) Herm Johnson	12
(United States) Jet Engineering	March	Cosworth (10); Chevrolet (All except 10)	64	(United States) John Morton	10-11, 13-16
(United States) Jet Engineering	Eagle	Chevrolet	85	(United States) John Morton	1
(United States) Timberwood Racing	March	Cosworth	66	(United States) Jerry Sneva	3
(United States) Primus Racing	March	Cosworth	72	(United States) Chris Kneifel	1-7, 9
(United States) Primus Racing	March	Cosworth	72	(United States) John Paul Jr.	8, 10
(United States) Baer Concrete	March	Cosworth	75	(United States) Tom Bigelow	3
(Canada) Canadian Tire Racing	March	Cosworth	76	(Canada) Jacques Villeneuve Sr.	1-2, 5-8, 12, 14-16
(Canada) Canadian Tire Racing	March	Cosworth	76	(Canada) Ludwig Heimrath Jr.	9
(United States) Ed Wachs Motor Sports	Theodore	Cosworth	78	(United Kingdom) Jim Crawford	1, 3, 6
(United States) Rattlesnake Racing	Rattlesnake	Cosworth	81	(United States) Larry Cannon	3
(United States) HR Racing	March	Cosworth	82	(United States) Gary Bettenhausen	3-5, 8-10
(United States) HR Racing	March	Cosworth	82	(United Kingdom) Jim Crawford	15
(United States) HR Racing	March	Cosworth	82	(Brazil) Emerson Fittipaldi	6-7
(United States) HR Racing	March	Cosworth	82	(United States) Steve Chassey	14
(United States) Center Line Racing	Eagle	Chevrolet	87	(United States) Steve Krisiloff	3
(United States) Ligier-Curb	Ligier	Cosworth	98	(United States) Kevin Cogan	1
(United States) Curb-All American Racers	Eagle	Pontiac (All other races); Chevrolet (8, 14)	88	(United States) Mike Chandler	1, 3
(United States) Curb-All American Racers	Eagle	Pontiac (All other races); Chevrolet (8, 14)	98	(United States) Kevin Cogan	3-7
(United States) Curb-All American Racers	Eagle	Pontiac (All other races); Chevrolet (8, 14)	98	(United States) Ed Pimm	9-16
(United States) Curb-All American Racers	Eagle	Pontiac (All other races); Chevrolet (8, 14)	98	(United States) Pete Halsmer	8
(United States) Curb-All American Racers	Eagle	Pontiac (All other races); Chevrolet (8, 14)	98	(United States) Mike Chandler	2

== Schedule ==
This season featured a new oval in Canada called Sanair Super Speedway. Other changes included new street circuit races at the Meadowlands Sports Complex, and in Long Beach, California. Also added was a new permanent road course race at Portland International Raceway. Leaving the schedule was Riverside International Raceway and Atlanta Motor Speedway.

Icon	Legend
O	Oval/Speedway
R	Road course
S	Street circuit

Rd	Date	Name	Circuit	Location
1	April 1	(United States) Toyota Grand Prix of Long Beach	S Streets of Long Beach	Long Beach, California
2	April 15	(United States) Dana Jimmy Bryan 150	O Phoenix International Raceway	Avondale, Arizona
3	May 27	(United States) Indianapolis 500	O Indianapolis Motor Speedway	Indianapolis, Indiana
4	June 3	(United States) Dana Rex Mays Classic	O Milwaukee Mile	West Allis, Wisconsin
5	June 17	(United States) Stroh's/G.I. Joe's 200	R Portland International Raceway	Portland, Oregon
6	July 1	(United States) Meadowlands Grand Prix	S Meadowlands Sports Complex	East Rutherford, New Jersey
7	July 8	(United States) Budweiser Cleveland Grand Prix	S Burke Lakefront Airport	Cleveland, Ohio
8	July 22	(United States) Michigan 500	O Michigan International Speedway	Brooklyn, Michigan
9	August 5	(United States) Provimi Veal 200	R Road America	Elkhart Lake, Wisconsin
10	August 19	(United States) Domino's Pizza 500	O Pocono International Raceway	Long Pond, Pennsylvania
11	September 2	(United States) Escort Radar Warning 200	R Mid-Ohio Sports Car Course	Lexington, Ohio
12	September 9	(Canada) Molson Indy 300	O Sanair Super Speedway	Saint-Pie, Quebec
13	September 24*	(United States) Detroit News Grand Prix	O Michigan International Speedway	Brooklyn, Michigan
14	October 14	(United States) Stroh's 150/Bobby Ball Memorial	O Phoenix International Raceway	Avondale, Arizona
15	October 21	(United States) Quinn's Cooler 300k	R Laguna Seca Raceway	Monterey, California
16	November 11	(United States) Caesars Palace Grand Prix	R Caesars Palace	Las Vegas, Nevada

* The Detroit News Grand Prix was scheduled to be held on September 23, but postponed a day by rain.

== Results ==
Rd	Race name	Pole position	Winning driver	Winning team	Race time	Report
1	Toyota Grand Prix of Long Beach	(United States) Mario Andretti	(United States) Mario Andretti	Newman/Haas Racing	2:15:23	Report
2	Dana Jimmy Bryan 150	(United States) Tom Sneva	(United States) Tom Sneva	Mayer Racing	1:14:39	Report
3	Indianapolis 500	(United States) Tom Sneva	(United States) Rick Mears	Team Penske	3:03:21	Report
4	Dana Rex Mays Classic	(United States) Rick Mears	(United States) Tom Sneva	Mayer Racing	1:41:41	Report
5	Stroh's/G.I. Joe's 200	(United States) Mario Andretti	(United States) Al Unser Jr.	Galles Racing	1:53:17	Report
6	Meadowlands Grand Prix	(United States) Mario Andretti	(United States) Mario Andretti	Newman/Haas Racing	2:04:59	Report
7	Budweiser Cleveland Grand Prix	(United States) Mario Andretti	(United States) Danny Sullivan	Doug Shierson Racing	1:50:17	Report
8	Michigan 500	(United States) Mario Andretti	(United States) Mario Andretti	Newman/Haas Racing	3:44:45	Report
9	Provimi Veal 200	(United States) Mario Andretti	(United States) Mario Andretti	Newman/Haas Racing	1:43:08	Report
10	Domino's Pizza 500	(United States) Rick Mears	(United States) Danny Sullivan	Doug Shierson Racing	3:38:29	Report
11	Escort Radar Warning 200	(United States) Mario Andretti	(United States) Mario Andretti	Newman/Haas Racing	1:59:50	Report
12	Molson Indy 300	(United States) Bobby Rahal	(United States) Danny Sullivan	Doug Shierson Racing	1:39:49	Report
13	Detroit News Grand Prix	(United States) Johnny Rutherford	(United States) Mario Andretti	Newman/Haas Racing	1:11:12	Report
14	Stroh's 150/Bobby Ball Memorial	(Canada) Jacques Villeneuve Sr.	(United States) Bobby Rahal	Truesports	1:31:47	Report
15	Quinn's Cooler 300k	(United States) Mario Andretti	(United States) Bobby Rahal	Truesports	1:35:47	Report
16	Caesars Palace Grand Prix	(United States) Danny Sullivan	(United States) Tom Sneva	Mayer Racing	2:08:13	Report

- Indianapolis was USAC-sanctioned but counted towards the CART title.

== Final points standings ==
=== Drivers points standings ===
Pos	Driver	LBH (United States)	PHX1 (United States)	INDY (United States)	MIL (United States)	POR (United States)	MEA (United States)	CLE (United States)	MIS1 (United States)	ROA (United States)	POC (United States)	MOH (United States)	SAN (Canada)	MIS2 (United States)	PHX2 (United States)	LAG (United States)	CPL (United States)	Pts
1	(United States) Mario Andretti	**1***	20	17	8	**26**	**1***	**21**	**1**	**1***	19	**1***	7	1	12	**2**	2	176
2	(United States) Tom Sneva	3	**1***	**16**	1*	5	6	19	2*	20	4	7	20	2	4	10	1*	163
3	(United States) Bobby Rahal	14	7	7	14	14	11	14*	18	2	3	2	**2***	5	1*	1*	7	137
4	(United States) Danny Sullivan	24	6	29	16	23	2	1	10	19	1	3	1	9	20	9	**18**	110
5	(United States) Rick Mears	21	18	1*	**2**	10	10	4	3	4	**2***	5	Wth					110
6	(United States) Al Unser Jr.	17	25	21	3	1*	4	24	26	13	21	19	6	6	2	4	4	103
7	(United States) Michael Andretti	10	3	5	4	12	13	3	20	16	23	16	3	7	3	3	24	102
8	(Australia) Geoff Brabham	2	16	33	17	2	3	8	9	5	14	21	15	11	16	5	5	87
9	(United States) Al Unser	22	21	3	5	27	8	10	30	3	8	8	13	4	17	6	14	76
10	(United States) Danny Ongais	DNQ	5	9	10	11	18	28	24		5		23	3	5	21	17	53
11	(Colombia) Roberto Guerrero RY	26	24	2	21	19	25	5	5	11	31	15	25	23	24	7	6	52
12	(United States) Howdy Holmes	13	2	13	7	17	17	12	21	14	9	6	9	8	19	20	16	44
13	(Mexico) Josele Garza	23	DNQ	10	DNS	7	23	17	11	7	25	11	4	10	8	13	10	42
14	(United States) Gordon Johncock	11	10	25	6	9	12	18	4	9	11	10	17	Wth	13		DNS	39
15	(Brazil) Emerson Fittipaldi R	5	12	32			7	20				4	18	12			13	30
16	(Canada) Jacques Villeneuve Sr. R	6	13	Wth		6	15	9	DNQ				8		**9**	24	15	30
17	(United States) John Paul Jr.	20	DNQ	DNQ						6	17	9		22		11	3	28
18	(United States) Al Holbert R	15	23	4	20	24	5	7	19	22	29	17		13	22	22	Wth	28
19	(Republic of Ireland) Derek Daly	7	15	27		4	19	6	17	18		18	21	21				26
20	(United States) Chip Ganassi	25	11	28	11	15	9	2	27						Wth			24
21	(United States) Pancho Carter			19					6		7				7		11	22
22	(United States) Johnny Rutherford			22					7		28		5	14*	11			20
23	(United States) Scott Brayton			18	22	25	14	11	13	12	6	12	11	Wth	23	15	8	19
24	(United States) Kevin Cogan	28	8	20	9	18	20	22	8	10	Wth							17
25	(Italy) Teo Fabi	18	19	24	12	3	27	13										15
26	(United States) Dick Simon	19	4	23	13	20	24	DNQ	12	15	12	24	12	15	21	14	Wth	15
27	(United Kingdom) Jim Crawford R	4		DNQ			21									23		12
28	(Italy) Corrado Fabi R											25	10		6		25	11
29	(United States) Pete Halsmer	8	14	DNQ	DNQ	22	26		14		18	13	24	18	18	26	9	9
30	(United States) Chris Kneifel	DNQ	9	15	23	8	DNQ	15	DNS	25								9
31	(United States) A. J. Foyt			6			DNQ		22		27			Wth	14		22	8
32	(United States) Herm Johnson			8	18							23	DNQ					5
33	(Italy) Bruno Giacomelli R	27	Wth	Wth												8		5
34	(Netherlands) Arie Luyendyk R									8								5
35	(United States) John Morton R	9									20	26		DNQ	DNQ	17	12	5
36	(United States) Ed Pimm R	12	Wth	DNQ	19	16	22	DNQ	33	26	13	22	22	19	10	12	19	5
37	(United States) Gary Bettenhausen			DNQ	15	13		DNQ	23	Wth	10			DNQ	DNQ			3
38	(United States) George Snider			11														2
39	(Australia) Dennis Firestone			12					DNQ	17	26		16			DNQ	21	1
40	(United States) Tom Gloy			14			16	23										0
41	(United States) Bill Alsup	DNQ	Wth	DNQ				Wth	16		24		14					0
42	(United States) Dale Coyne					DNQ	DNQ	DNQ	DNQ	DNQ		14			DNQ	DNQ		0
43	(United States) Tony Bettenhausen Jr. R	DNQ	22	26					15		16							0
44	(United States) Chet Fillip			DNQ					31		15	DNQ		17				0
45	(United States) Mike Nish R														15		DNQ	0
46	(United States) Steve Chassey	DNQ	DNQ	DNQ	DNQ		DNQ	16	32	24	22	28		20	DNQ	16	DNQ	0
47	(United States) Peter Kuhn											20	DNQ	16		25		0
48	(United States) Mike Chandler	16	DNQ	DNQ														0
49	(United States) Johnny Parsons	DNQ	17	DNQ														0
50	(New Zealand) Mike Thackwell R															18	20	0
51	(United States) Randy Lewis						DNQ	26		DNQ						19	23	0
52	(United States) Dick Ferguson	DNQ	DNQ	DNQ	DNQ		DNQ	27	DNQ	21	33	27	DNQ			27		0
53	(United States) Stan Fox			DNQ	24	27	DNQ		27	DNQ	25	DNQ	22	DNQ	DNQ	Wth		0
54	(Canada) Ludwig Heimrath Jr. R									23								0
55	(United States) Jerry Karl			DNQ							30			24				0
56	(United States) Spike Gehlhausen			31				DNQ	25									0
57	(New Zealand) Graham McRae						DNQ	25										0
58	(United States) Roger Mears	DNQ	26	DNQ														0
59	(Spain) José Romero					28												0
60	(United Kingdom) Kenny Acheson						28			DNQ						Wth		0
61	(United States) Phil Krueger			DNQ					29									0
62	(United States) Patrick Bedard			30														0
–	(United States) Steve Hostetler					DNQ	DNQ	DNQ				DNQ				DNQ		0
–	(United States) Phil Caliva	DNQ		DNQ														0
–	(United States) Bill Tempero	DNQ								DNQ								0
–	(United States) Chuck Ciprich		DNQ	DNQ														0
–	(United States) Tom Bigelow			DNQ	DNQ													0
–	(South Africa) Desiré Wilson	DNQ		Wth														0
–	(United States) Jim McElreath		DNQ															0
–	(United States) Jerry Sneva			DNQ														0
–	(United States) Larry Cannon			DNQ														0
–	(United States) Barry Ruble							DNQ										0
–	(United States) Steve Krisiloff			Wth														0
–	(United States) Brad Murphey											Wth					Wth	0
Pos	Driver	LBH (United States)	PHX1 (United States)	INDY (United States)	MIL (United States)	POR (United States)	MEA (United States)	CLE (United States)	MIS1 (United States)	ROA (United States)	POC (United States)	MOH (United States)	SAN (Canada)	MIS2 (United States)	PHX2 (United States)	LAG (United States)	CPL (United States)	Pts

Color	Result
Gold	Winner
Silver	2nd place
Bronze	3rd place
Green	4th-6th place
Light Blue	7th-12th place
Dark Blue	Finished (Outside Top 12)
Purple	Did not finish
Red	Did not qualify (DNQ)
Brown	Withdrawn (Wth)
Black	Disqualified (DSQ)
White	Did not start (DNS)
White	Injured (Inj)
Blank	Did not participate (DNP)
Blank	Not competing

**In-line notation**
**Bold**	Pole position
Italics	Ran fastest race lap
*	Led most race laps
RY	Rookie of the Year
R	Rookie

=== Nations' Cup ===
Best result in each race counts towards the Nations' cup.

Pos	Country	LGB	PIR1	IND	MIL	POR	MEA	CLE	MIS1	ROA	POC	MOH	SAN	MIS2	PIR2	LAG	LAS	Points
1	United States	1	1	1	1	1	1	1	1	1	1	1	1	1	1	1	1	**351**
2	Australia	2	16	12	17	2	3	8	9	5	14	21	15	11	16	5	5	**87**
3	Colombia	26	24	2	21	19	25	5	5	11	31	15	25	23	24	7	6	**52**
4	Mexico	23	DNQ	10	DNS	7	23	17	11	7	25	11	4	10	8	13	10	**42**
5	Italy	18	19	24	12	3	27	13				25	10		6	8	25	**31**
6	Brazil	5	12	32			7	20				4	18	12			13	**30**
7	Canada	6	13	Wth		6	15	9		23			8		9	24	15	**30**
8	Ireland	7	15	27		4	19	6	17	18		18	21	21				**26**
9	United Kingdom	4		DNQ			21									23		**12**
10	Netherlands									8								**5**
11	New Zealand						DNQ	25								18	20	**0**
12	Spain					28												**0**
-	South Africa	DNQ		DNQ														-
Pos	Country	LGB	PIR1	IND	MIL	POR	MEA	CLE	MIS1	ROA	POC	MOH	SAN	MIS2	PIR2	LAG	LAS	Points

=== Driver Breakdown ===
Pos	Driver	Team	Starts	Wins	Podiums	Top 5s	Top 10s	Poles	Points
1	(United States) Ma. Andretti	(United States) Newman/Haas Racing	16	6	8	8	10	7	176
2	(United States) T. Sneva	(United States) Mayer Racing	16	3	6	9	12	2	163
3	(United States) Rahal	(United States) Truesports	16	2	6	7	10	1	137
4	(United States) Sullivan	(United States) Doug Shierson Racing	16	3	5	5	9	1	110
4	(United States) Ri. Mears	(United States) Team Penske	11	1	4	7	9	2	110
6	(United States) Unser Jr.	(United States) Galles Racing	16	1	3	6	8	0	103
7	(United States) Mi. Andretti	(United States) Kraco Racing	16	0	5	7	9	0	102
8	(Australia) Brabham	(United States) Kraco Racing	16	0	3	6	8	1	87
9	(United States) Unser	(United States) Team Penske	16	0	2	4	9	0	76
10	(United States) Ongais	(United States) Interscope Racing	13	0	1	4	6	0	53
11	(Colombia) Guerrero R	(United States) Bignotti-Cotter Racing	16	0	1	3	5	0	52
12	(United States) Holmes	(United States) Mayer Racing	16	0	1	1	6	0	44
13	(Mexico) Garza	(United States) Machinists Union Racing	14	0	0	1	6	0	42
14	(United States) Johncock	(United States) Patrick Racing	13	0	0	1	6	0	39
15	(Brazil) Fittipaldi R	(United States) GTS Racing (United States) HR Racing (United States) Patrick Racing	9	0	0	2	3	0	30
15	(Canada) Villeneuve Sr.	(Canada) Canadian Tire Racing	9	0	0	0	5	1	30
17	(United States) Paul Jr.	(United States) VDS Racing (United States) Primus Racing (United States) Patrick Racing (United States) Provimi Veal Racing	7	0	1	1	3	0	28
17	(United States) Holbert R	(United States) Morales Motorsport	14	0	0	2	3	0	28
19	(Republic of Ireland) Daly	(United States) Provimi Veal Racing	11	0	0	1	3	0	26
20	(United States) Ganassi	(United States) Patrick Racing	8	0	1	1	2	0	24
21	(United States) Carter	(United States) Galles Racing (United States) American Dream Racing (United States) Patrick Racing	5	0	0	0	3	0	22
22	(United States) Rutherford	(United States) Doug Shierson Racing (United States) Gilmore Racing (United States) Team Penske	6	0	0	1	2	1	20
23	(United States) Brayton	(United States) Brayton Racing	14	0	0	0	2	0	19
24	(United States) Cogan	(United States) Curb Racing (United States) Curb-All American Racers (United States) Forsythe Racing	9	0	0	0	4	0	17
25	(Italy) T. Fabi	(United States) Forsythe Racing	7	0	1	1	1	0	15
25	(United States) Simon	(United States) Dick Simon Racing	14	0	0	1	1	0	15
27	(United Kingdom) Crawford R	(United States) Ed Wachs Motor Sports (United States) HR Racing	3	0	0	1	1	0	12
28	(Italy) C. Fabi R	(United States) Forstyhe Racing	4	0	0	0	2	0	11
29	(United States) Kneifel	(United States) Primus Racing	6	0	0	0	2	0	9
29	(United States) Halsmer	(United States) Arciero Racing (United States) Curb-All American Racers	12	0	0	0	2	0	9
31	(United States) Foyt	(United States) Gilmore Racing	5	0	0	0	1	0	8
32	(United States) Johnson	(United States) Menard Racing (United States) Pace Racing (United States) Jet Engineering	3	0	0	0	1	0	5
32	(Italy) Giacomelli R	(United States) Theodore Racing (United States) Patrick Racing	2	0	0	0	1	0	5
32	(Netherlands) Luyendyk R	(United States) Provimi Veal Racing	1	0	0	0	1	0	5
32	(United States) Morton R	(United States) Jet Engineering	5	0	0	0	1	0	5
32	(United States) Pimm R	(United States) Jet Engineering (United States) Curb-All American Racers	13	0	0	0	1	0	5
37	(United States) G. Bettenhausen	(United States) HR Racing (United States) Leader Card Racing (United States) Pace Racing	4	0	0	0	1	0	3
38	(United States) Snider	(United States) Gilmore Racing	1	0	0	0	0	0	1
39	(Australia) Firestone	(United States) Pace Racing (United States) Purcell Racing	5	0	0	0	0	0	1
40	(United States) Chandler	(United States) Curb-All American Racers (United States) Curb Racing	1	0	0	0	0	0	0
40	(United States) Parsons	(United States) Wysard Racing (United States) McCray Racing	1	0	0	0	0	0	0
40	(United States) Ro. Mears	(United States) American Dream Racing (United States) Machinists Union Racing	1	0	0	0	0	0	0
40	(United States) T. Bettenhausen Jr.	(United States) Provimi Veal Racing	4	0	0	0	0	0	0
40	(United States) Gloy	(United States) Galles Racing	3	0	0	0	0	0	0
40	(United States) Bedard	(United States) Brayton Racing	1	0	0	0	0	0	0
40	(United States) Fox	(United States) Leader Card Racing	5	0	0	0	0	0	0
40	(Spain) Romero	(United States) GTS Racing	1	0	0	0	0	0	0
40	(United Kingdom) Acheson	(United States) Hall Properties (United States) GTS Racing (United States) HR Racing (United States) Forsythe Racing	1	0	0	0	0	0	0
40	(United States) Ferguson	(United States) Hess Racing	5	0	0	0	0	0	0
40	(New Zealand) McRae	(United States) Pace Racing	1	0	0	0	0	0	0
40	(United States) Lewis	(United States) Wysard Racing (United States) Machinists Union Racing	3	0	0	0	0	0	0
40	(United States) Chassey	(United States) Gohr Racing	7	0	0	0	0	0	0
40	(United States) Alsup	(United States) Alsup Racing	3	0	0	0	0	0	0
40	(United States) Gehlhausen	(United States) Indy Auto Racing	1	0	0	0	0	0	0
40	(United States) Krueger	(United States) Ellme Racing	1	0	0	0	0	0	0
40	(United States) Fillip	(United States) VDS Racing	2	0	0	0	0	0	0
40	(Canada) Heimrath Jr.	(Canada) Canadian Tire Racing	1	0	0	0	0	0	0
40	(United States) Karl	(United States) McCray Racing (United States) Renaissance Racing	2	0	0	0	0	0	0
40	(United States) Coyne	(United States) Dale Coyne Racing	1	0	0	0	0	0	0
40	(United States) Kuhn	(United States) McCray Racing	3	0	0	0	0	0	0
40	(United States) Nish	(United States) Dick Simon Racing	1	0	0	0	0	0	0
40	(New Zealand) Thackwell R	(United States) Team Penske	2	0	0	0	0	0	0

== See also ==
- 1983–84 USAC Championship Car season
- 1984 Indianapolis 500
