= 1985 Champ Car season =

The 1985 Champ Car season may refer to:

- the 1984–85 USAC Championship Car season, which was just one race, the 69th Indianapolis 500
- the 1985 CART PPG Indy Car World Series, sanctioned by CART, who later became Champ Car
