= Walt Disney World Speedway =

Motorsport track in the United States

The Mickyard

- Tri-oval (1995–2015)
- Location: Floridian Way; Walt Disney World Resort; Bay Lake, Florida, U.S.
- Coordinates: 28°23′48.02″N 81°34′39.61″W
- Capacity: 30,000 (2000–2015); 43,000 (1999); 51,000 (1996)
- Owner: Walt Disney Company
- Operator: IMS Events, Inc.
- Broke ground: June 6, 1995; 31 years ago
- Opened: November 28, 1995; 30 years ago
- Closed: August 9, 2015; 11 years ago
- Construction cost: $6 million
- Architect: Kevin Forbes
- Major events: Indy Racing League; Indy 200 (1996–2000); NASCAR Craftsman Truck Series; Chevy Trucks Challenge (1997–1998); U.S. F2000 National Championship (1996–1998); United States Auto Club#USAC Silver Crown Series (1998–2000)
- Website: http://disneyworld.disney.go.com/recreation/richard-petty-driving-experience/

Tri-oval (1995–2015)
- Surface: Asphalt
- Length: 1.609 km (1.000 mi)
- Turns: 3
- Banking: Turn 1: 10 degrees Turn 2: 8.5 degrees Turn 3: 7 degrees
- Race lap record: 0:20.954 ( (United States) Buzz Calkins, Reynard 95I, 1996, IRL)

Walt Disney World Speedway was a racing facility located on the grounds of the Walt Disney World Resort in Bay Lake, Florida, near Orlando.

It was built in 1995 by IMS Events, Inc., a subsidiary of the Indianapolis Motor Speedway Corporation, and was designed primarily as a venue for the Indy 200 at Walt Disney World, an Indy Racing League event.

The circuit's primary use was as a venue for the Richard Petty Driving Experience, and the Indy Racing Experience, programs that allow fans to drive or ride in real race cars. After the 2000 racing season, it was no longer used as a track for major motorsports racing series, but was used by many racing teams from IndyCar to NASCAR as a test venue due to the warmer climate than other tracks around the United States during the off season for racing. However, the track closed permanently on August 9, 2015.

AutoWeek magazine and the Orlando Sentinel dubbed the track "The Mickyard" (a portmanteau of the Disney icon Mickey Mouse and Indianapolis Motor Speedway's nickname, the "Brickyard").

== History ==
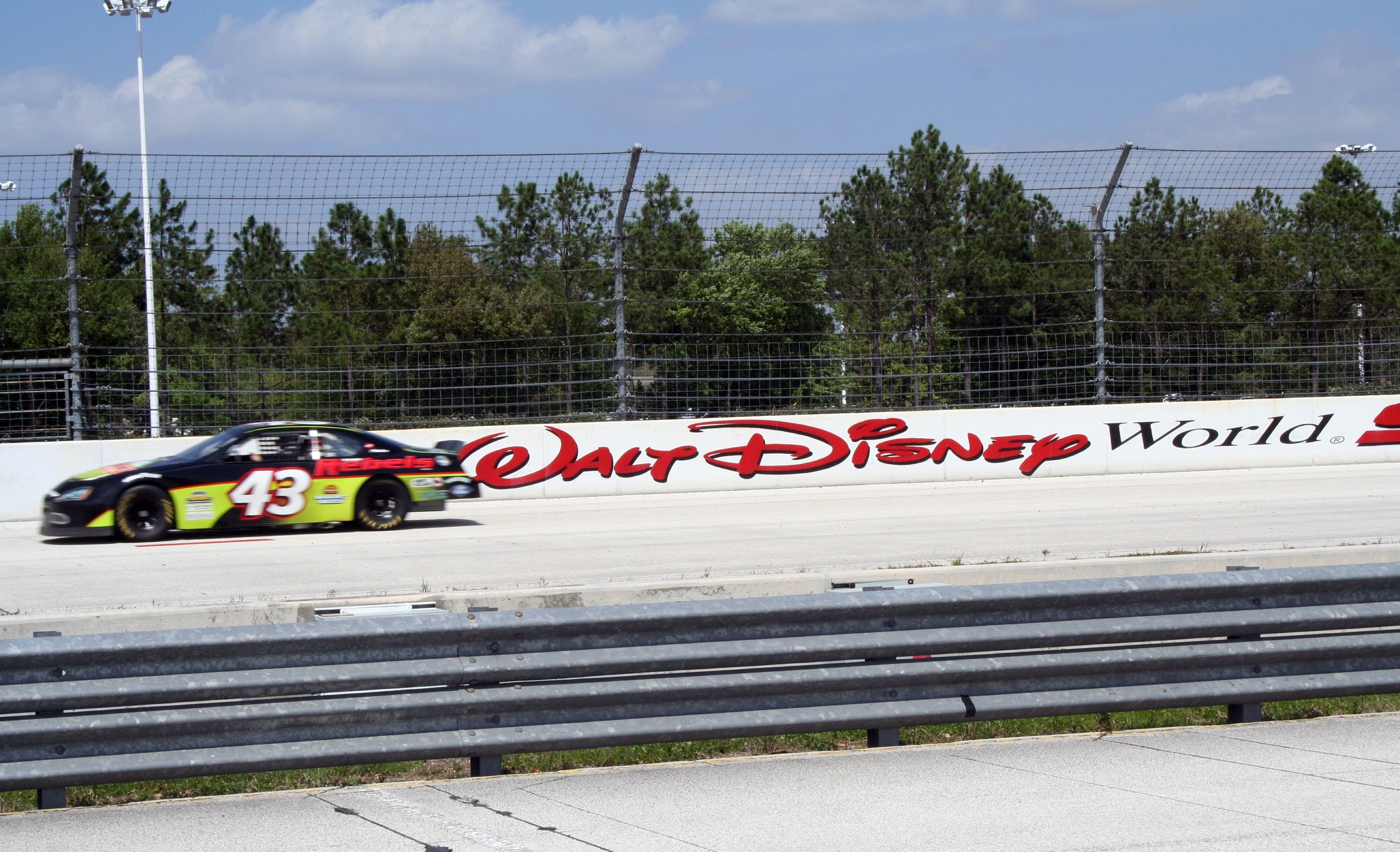
A student practicing at Walt Disney World Speedway in 2010

The track was a three-turn tri-oval, designed by Indianapolis Motor Speedway chief engineer Kevin Forbes, and the location was chosen in September 1994 by Greg Ruse of Buena Vista Construction. The track was situated on a triangular plot of land adjacent to the Magic Kingdom's parking lot near Disney's Polynesian Resort. Plans for the track were first announced on January 23, 1995. The track was designed to fit within the boundaries of the existing infrastructure, requiring minimal rerouting of existing roads.

On June 27, 1995, Indianapolis Motor Speedway Chairman of the Board Mari Hulman George took part in a groundbreaking ceremony. She presented the track with one of the original paving bricks from the famous "Brickyard." In a rather compact schedule, the one-mile (1.6 km) track was completed with ten miles (16 km) of safety restraint cabling, 2 acres (8,100 m^{2}) of fencing, 1,800 yards (1,600 m) of concrete for outside walls, 2,300 feet (700 m) of concrete for pit walls and 5,200 tons of asphalt for the track surface. Despite 1995 having the wettest June–July in Orlando on record (75 inches of rain), including Hurricane Erin, the construction was completed on-time, with final paving completed October 18, 1995.

The track was dedicated on November 28, 1995. Indy Racing League drivers Arie Luyendyk, Eddie Cheever, Eliseo Salazar, Lyn St. James and Davey Hamilton drove a five-car "Flying V" formation amongst fireworks. Initial testing at the facility for the Indy Racing League took place November 27–December 9, 1995.

The race track hosted its first car race, a Formula Ford 2000 support race on January 26, 1996, followed the next day with the Indy Racing League's Indy 200 car race. On February 7, 1997, the first racing experience program, the Richard Petty Driving Experience, opened at the Speedway.

=== Closure and demolition ===
On March 27, 2015, it was announced that the speedway would close on August 9, 2015, and be razed. Demolition began late August to make way for "transportation improvements", namely expanding and reconfiguring the Magic Kingdom parking lot and parking entrance. Ultimately a large lake was created on the site in addition to expanded Magic Kingdom parking.

== Design ==
Walt Disney World Speedway was constructed on a very limited budget. By design, permanent features of the facility were built at a minimum. The track plans called for only the track surface, retaining wall, and catch fence to be constructed. The remainder of the facility, such as seating areas, restrooms, and race support areas would be built on a temporary, as-needed basis. This strategy had never been used on an oval race track, but had been widely successful for years in temporary street circuits (such as Long Beach). No permanent garages were built on the premises, but this was not entirely unusual. Race teams would simply work out of their transporters, a practice used frequently at street circuits and other tracks without garages.

The initial savings in construction costs was significant. Temporary bleachers and restroom facilities would be erected each year beginning in November, in preparations for the races in January. The lack of permanent grandstands also allowed track officials to adjust the configuration and capacity of seating annually reflecting ticket demand. This practice, however, would prove to be inconvenient and increasingly expensive in the long run since the grandstand area encompassed a portion of the Magic Kingdom parking lot. That area of the lot would be unusable for nearly three months, including during the busy Christmas and New Year's holiday season at the theme park.

Three linked ponds in the track's infield are formed in the shape of Mickey Mouse. The pond, dubbed "Lake Mickey", was built a year after the track opened due to drainage concerns.

=== Parking problems ===
Initially, the track location, which was adjacent to the Magic Kingdom parking lot, was seen to be convenient. However, after a couple of years, traffic control on race days became overwhelming. Because race spectators would arrive at the same time and place as regular Magic Kingdom theme park guests, overflow parking was required. In 1996–1997, Disney officials reacted by parking all race spectators in the Magic Kingdom parking lot, and diverting all Magic Kingdom guests to the Epcot parking lot. Race spectators would walk to the nearby Speedway, while all guests to the Magic Kingdom were required to take the monorail or a bus from Epcot to the Transportation and Ticket Center. There, they would transfer to a monorail on the Magic Kingdom loop, a somewhat circuitous trip which resulted in numerous guest complaints. In 1997, the IRL race was shortened by a sudden rainstorm, causing fans to hurry to their cars and resulting in severe traffic gridlock on World Drive and surrounding roads which lasted for several hours.

Starting in 1998, race spectators were diverted to park at Epcot, and were taken by shuttle bus to the Speedway while guests to the Magic Kingdom were directed to park, as usual, in the Magic Kingdom parking lot. While this eased many theme park guest complaints, it was now inconvenient for race spectators as it required them to arrive earlier to account for the additional travel time. It also resulted in a significant cost increase in race operations, as the Disney Transport bus fleet was not big enough to accommodate the race shuttle operation and outside bus companies had to be hired to run the race shuttle service.

== End of professional racing ==
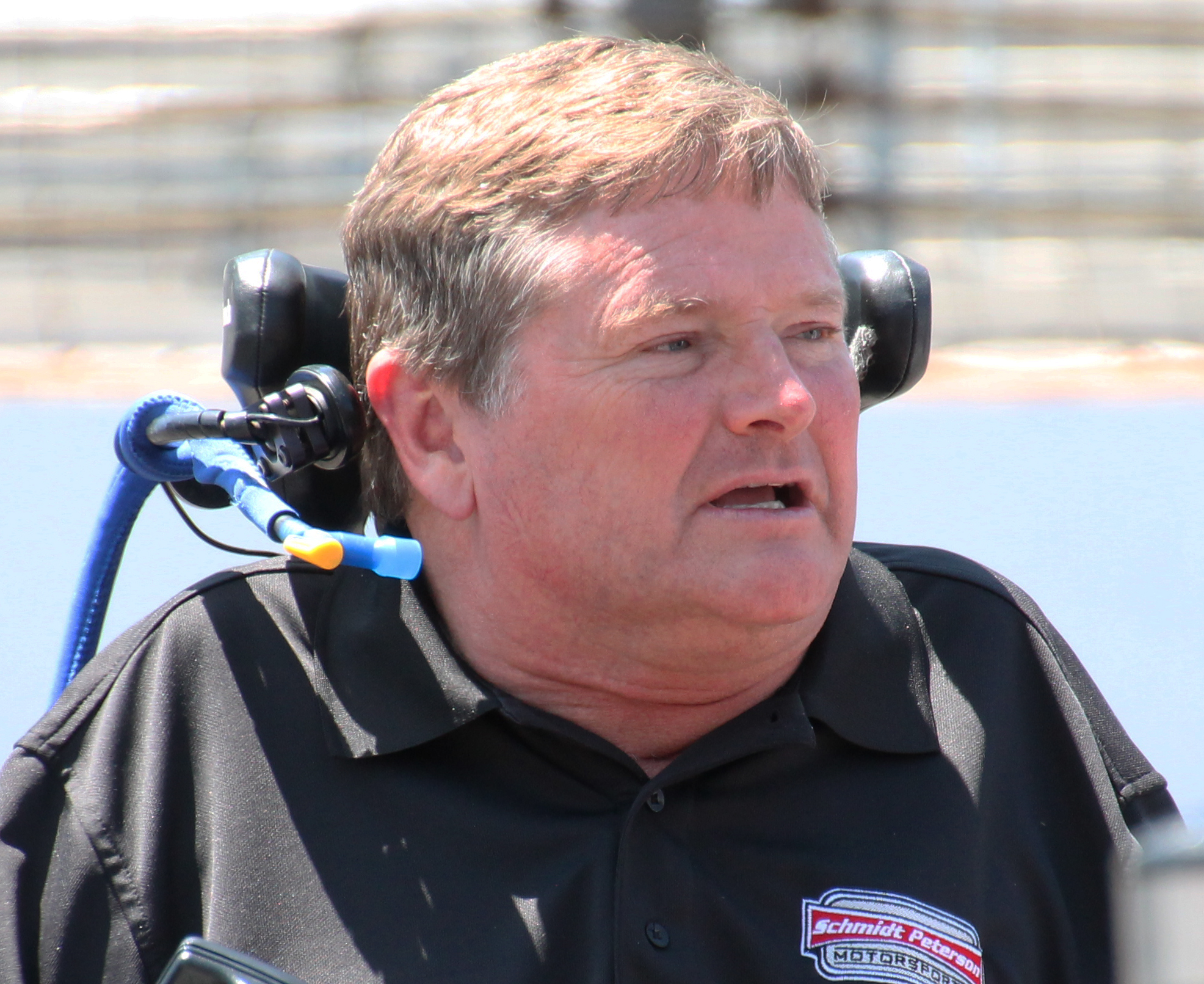
Sam Schmidt was paralyzed after an accident at Walt Disney World Speedway in 2000

In its first few years of operation, the track was used frequently as a year-round test facility, due to the warm winter weather in Orlando. However, the track suffered three major accidents. During a week of preseason testing, on January 11, 1997, IRL driver Eliseo Salazar crashed in turn one. He suffered a fracture of his lower back, and missed two races. Two weeks later, on January 23, 1997, IRL driver Davy Jones broke his neck after a practice crash in turn three. On January 6, 2000, IRL driver Sam Schmidt was paralyzed after a crash in preseason testing. The track was built before the SAFER barrier was introduced, which many feel may have lessened the injuries in all three cases.

After the 2000 IRL season, series officials and Walt Disney World were not able to come to an agreement for a race date for 2001. IRL officials were dissatisfied with the January date, as it was seen to be too early for most teams to be prepared for the season. There was typically a six-week gap until the second race of the season. Disney officials also were concerned with the impending conflict with Super Bowl XXXV, to be held in Tampa presumably the same weekend. Initial talks planned to move the race date to Labor Day weekend, and ultimately to a new facility to be built near U.S. 192. The NASCAR Craftsman Truck Series had already declined to renew its contract with the Speedway for similar reasons after 1998. The talks quietly ceased between the IRL and Disney, and the race was not scheduled for 2001. It was ultimately removed from the IRL schedule permanently. That same year, the IRL added a race at Homestead, in south Florida, and in 2005 added St. Petersburg, near Tampa, both which helped fill the void in Florida.

=== Driving Experiences ===
During the off-season in 1997, the track began hosting the Richard Petty Driving Experience, a stock car-based racing organization that allowed the general public to drive real NASCAR machines, or ride along with a professional driver and served as the track's primary function, year-round. It was the only track used by the RPDE that, weather permitting, operated roughly 365 days a year. To assist in the increased ingress and egress, a one-lane automobile tunnel was built for the 1997 season. In the summer of 1999, a new visitor center and gift shop was built to permanently house operations for RPDE. A new modest garage facility was built for them also. The operation had previously worked out of trailers and tents, without significant utilities.

On November 13, 2008, it was announced that the track would be shared with the Indy Racing Experience, a similar program to RPDE. The IndyCar two-seater machine would be used for fan ride-alongs, and Indy cars would also be available to be driven by fans. After appearing at various tracks on a largely irregular schedule, the Indy Racing Experience made the track its permanent year-round home.

On January 16, 2012, a new driving experience started business at Walt Disney World Speedway geared towards high end "supercars" called the Exotic Driving Experience. Modifications were made to the speedway's infield to create an "Exotics Course" which was a one-mile layout that ran clockwise and combined part of the oval with a street-style course.

=== Other uses ===
- On February 19–20, 1999, the track hosted the 7th Annual SunDay Challenge Alternative Energy Vehicle Rally. The highlight of the meet featured the Formula Lightning teams of Ohio State, Kettering, and FAMU/FSU. The event was covered by Central Florida News 13.
- On April 9, 2002, the first test of the new Infiniti Pro Series was conducted at the track, with Robby McGehee driving over 100 miles (160 km). The series debuted later that season.
- The oval was part of the course of the Walt Disney World Marathon in some years.

== Track records ==
=== Indy Racing League ===
Type	Distance	Date	Driver	Time	Average speed (mph)
Qualifying	1 lap (1.0 miles)	January 25, 1996	Buddy Lazier	19.847 seconds	181.388
Race	200 miles (320 km)	January 27, 1996	Buzz Calkins	1:33:30.748	128.748

- Unofficial all-time track record: Buddy Lazier, 19.450 seconds; 185.089 mph (January 13, 1996)

== Lap records ==
The fastest official race lap records at Walt Disney World Speedway are listed as:

Category	Time	Driver	Vehicle	Date
Tri-Oval: 1.609 km (1995–2015)
Indy Racing League	0:20.954	Buzz Calkins	Reynard 95I	1996 Indy 200 at Walt Disney World
U.S. F2000	0:28.212	David Besnard	Van Diemen RF98	1998 Indy 200

== Past race results ==
=== Indy Racing League ===
The Indy Racing League IndyCar Series Indy 200 was the first event held at the track. The 1996 running marked the first race conducted by the IRL, and the original intent for the facility.

Season	Date	Race name	Driver	Team	Chassis	Engine	Race distance		Race time	Average speed (mph)	Refs
Season	Date	Race name	Driver	Team	Chassis	Engine	Laps	Miles (km)	Race time	Average speed (mph)	Refs
1996	January 27	Indy 200 at Walt Disney World by Aurora	Buzz Calkins	Bradley Motorsports	Reynard	Ford	200	200 (321.868)	1:33:31	128.325	
1997	January 25	Indy 200 at Walt Disney World by Aurora	Eddie Cheever	Team Cheever	G-Force	Aurora	149*	149 (239.792)	1:06.43	133.995	
1998	January 24	Indy 200 at Walt Disney World by Aurora	Tony Stewart	Team Menard	G-Force	Aurora	200	200 (321.868)	2:06:07	95.127	
1999	January 24*	TransWorld Diversified Services Indy 200	Eddie Cheever	Team Cheever	Dallara	Aurora	200	200 (321.868)	1:41:15	118.538	
2000	January 29	Delphi Indy 200	Robbie Buhl	Dreyer & Reinbold Racing	Dallara	Aurora	200	200 (321.868)	1:57:19	102.292	

- 1997: Race shortened due to rain.
- 1999: Race scheduled for and held on a Sunday.

=== NASCAR Craftsman Truck Series ===
The Chevy Trucks Challenge was a NASCAR Craftsman Truck Series event held at the track from 1997–1998. It served as the season opening event of both years. The race was discontinued after 1998 due to the wide gap (10 weeks) it created until the second event of the season.

Year	Date	No.	Driver	Teams	Manufacturer	Race distance		Race time	Average speed (mph)	Ref
Year	Date	No.	Driver	Teams	Manufacturer	Laps	Miles (km)	Race time	Average speed (mph)	Ref
1997	January 19	80	Joe Ruttman	Roush Racing	Ford	200	200 (321.868)	2:16:08	88.159	
1998	January 18	16	Ron Hornaday Jr.	Dale Earnhardt, Inc.	Chevrolet	204*	204 (328.306)	2:10:10	94.033	

- 1998: Race extended due to a green–white–checker finish.

=== USAC Formula Ford 2000 ===
The Formula Ford Walt Disney World Challenge was a 50-lap, 50-mile (80 km) race for the USAC Formula Ford 2000 series. It was held as a support race to the Indy Racing League event for the first three years of operation.

- 1996 (United States) Sam Schmidt
- 1997 (Brazil) Urubatan Helou Jr.
- 1998 (Australia) David Besnard

=== USAC Silver Crown Series ===
The Silver Bullet 50 was a 50-lap, 50-mile (80 km) race for the USAC Silver Crown Series. During its first running, it was held in support to the NASCAR Craftsman Truck Series race. For 1999–2000, it was held as a support race to the Indy Racing League event.

- 1998 (United States) Brian Tyler
- 1999 (United States) Mike Bliss
- 2000 (United States) Brian Tyler

== Incidents ==
From 1995 to 2015, the track experienced one fatal accident. On April 12, 2015, driving instructor Gary Terry, 36, was fatally injured after a crash during a run as part of the Exotic Driving Experience. Terry was riding in the passenger seat of a Lamborghini Gallardo LP570-4 Superleggera, when the driver lost control and crashed into a metal guardrail. Terry died at the scene while the driver, identified as 24-year-old Tavon Watson, was transported to the hospital with minor injuries. Florida Highway Patrol investigated and announced that, while the decision to run vehicles clockwise (instead of counterclockwise as the track was designed for) may have been a factor in the incident, it was an accident and no charges were filed against the driver since it was on private property.
