= Frank Chianelli =

American racing driver

Frank Chianelli (April 28, 1956 – April 14, 2002) was an American racing driver from Pittsburgh, Pennsylvania.

Chianelli competed in the SCCA Formula Super Vee Pro Series in 1987 and 1988 after competing in a handful of Can-Am races in 1986.

Chianelli attempted to make his CART IndyCar debut in 1985 at Pocono Raceway driving a two-year-old March chassis for his own team but failed to qualify.

Chianelli was involved in a notable incident during his tenure in Can-Am at Mosport when his car, which was a former CART Indy Car converted to Can-Am specification, was split in two in dramatic fashion by a crash. Chianelli was uninjured.
