= 1985 CART PPG Indy Car World Series =

American motorsport season

1985 CART season
- PPG Indy Car World Series

Season
- Races: 15
- Start date: April 14
- End date: November 10

Awards
- Drivers' champion: (United States) Al Unser
- Constructors' Cup: (United Kingdom) March 85C/84C
- Manufacturers' Cup: (United Kingdom) Cosworth DFX
- Nations' Cup: United States
- Rookie of the Year: (Netherlands) Arie Luyendyk
- Indianapolis 500 winner: (United States) Danny Sullivan

The 1985 CART PPG Indy Car World Series season was the 7th national championship season of American open wheel racing sanctioned by CART. The season consisted of 15 races. Al Unser Sr. was the national champion, and the rookie of the year was Arie Luyendyk. The 1985 Indianapolis 500 was sanctioned by USAC, but counted towards the CART points championship. Danny Sullivan won the Indy 500, in dramatic fashion, a race that became known as the "Spin and Win."

In September 1984, Rick Mears suffered serious leg injuries in a crash at Sanair. Mears drove only a part-time schedule in 1985, racing at Indianapolis, and subsequently on ovals only. Al Unser Sr. took Mears' full-time seat at Penske Racing as a substitute for the season. Unser had one win, ten top fives, and one other top ten, en route to the championship, a battle that climaxed in dramatic fashion in the final race of the season.

== Season summary ==
Defending series champion Mario Andretti won the season opener, finished second at the Indy 500, and won the next two races, jumping out to the early points lead. A mid-season slump, however, saw him achieve only one top five finish the remainder of the year. He then broke his collarbone in a crash at Michigan, and was forced to sit out one race. The driver of the season became Al Unser Jr., who won the next two races (Meadowlands and Cleveland), and finished the year with nine finishes in the top 4.

At the midpoint of the season, Mario Andretti's points lead had dwindled, while Emerson Fittipaldi, Al Unser Sr., and Al Unser Jr. were all closing in. At the Pocono 500, Rick Mears triumphantly returned to victory lane after his leg injuries. Finishing second and third were Al Jr. and Al Sr., respectively, with Al Sr. now taking the points lead. Unser Jr. ate away at the points lead over the next four races, and the Unsers were neck-and-neck approaching the season finale. Meanwhile, Bobby Rahal was making a championship run of his own, winning 3 out of 4 races, and four poles in a row during a stretch in September–October. He almost won four races in row, but was taken out while leading at Sanair with only 13 laps to go. Rahal closed to within 13 points of the championship lead.

With two races to go, Unser Jr. led Unser Sr. by only 3 points. Father and son finished 1st and 2nd at Phoenix, and the standings were flipped. Al Sr. led Al Jr. by 3 points going into the finale at Miami. Rahal finished a distant 6th at Phoenix, and was mathematically eliminated from the championship.

The season finale at Tamiami Park ended in dramatic fashion. Danny Sullivan and Bobby Rahal finished 1st and 2nd, respectively, but the attention of the day was focused on the two Unsers. Late in the race, Al Unser Jr. was running third, and Al Unser Sr. was running 5th. At the moment, Al Jr. was leading the hypothetical championship standings by 1 point.

In the closing laps, Al Unser Sr. chased down and passed Roberto Moreno for 4th place. He held on to finish fourth, and thus won the championship by 1 point over his son. Unser Sr. afterwards expressed some regret about snatching the championship title from his son, but felt it was his responsibility to his own team and his own sponsors to race to his ability all the way to the end. It was also in the best interests of sportsmanship to all competitors not to give favor to his son. Unser Sr. also knew his days were numbered as a competitive driver on the circuit, while he knew Unser Jr. had many years ahead to have another chance at the title (Al Unser Jr. would indeed win the championship twice - 1990 and 1994).

The 1985 season saw two controversies at two separate races. The Michigan 500 had to be postponed for a week due to tire issues. In September, the race at Sanair came to a bizarre conclusion when the safety car, leading the field on the final lap under caution, suddenly veered into the pits on the final turn. Leader Johnny Rutherford was not informed, and second place Pancho Carter accelerated past him and beat him to the finish line. Officials initially awarded the victory to Carter, and Rutherford protested. After review, Rutherford was eventually restored the victory. (In many motorsport codes, the safety car exits to pit lane on the final lap; in most North American codes, the safety car remains on the circuit towards the finish line.)

== Drivers and teams ==
The following teams and drivers competed in the 1985 Indy Car World Series season. All cars used Goodyear tires.

Team	Chassis	Engine	No*	Drivers	Rounds
Team Penske	March 85C	Cosworth DFX	4 (5)	(United States) Danny Sullivan	All
Team Penske	March 85C	Cosworth DFX	5 (1)	(United States) Rick Mears	2–3, 7, 9, 12
Team Penske	March 85C	Cosworth DFX	5 (1)	(United States) Al Unser	2–3, 7, 9, 12
Team Penske	March 85C	Cosworth DFX	11	(United States) Al Unser	All except 3
Doug Shierson Racing	Lola T900	Cosworth DFX	30	(United States) Al Unser Jr.	All
Truesports Co.	March 85C	Cosworth DFX	3 (10)	(United States) Bobby Rahal	All
Truesports Co.	March 85C	Cosworth DFX	8	(Canada) Ludwig Heimrath Jr.	10
Newman/Haas Racing	Lola T900	Cosworth DFX	1 (3)	(United States) Mario Andretti	All except 8
Newman/Haas Racing	Lola T900	Cosworth DFX	1 (3)	(Australia) Alan Jones	8
Patrick Racing	March 85C	Cosworth DFX	20	(Italy) Bruno Giacomelli	1, 4–6, 8, 10–11, 13, 15
Patrick Racing	March 85C	Cosworth DFX	20	(United States) Sammy Swindell	7, 9
Patrick Racing	March 85C	Cosworth DFX	20	(United States) Don Whittington	2-3, 12, 14
Patrick Racing	March 85C	Cosworth DFX	40	(Brazil) Emerson Fittipaldi	All
Patrick Racing	March 85C	Cosworth DFX	60	(United States) Rich Vogler	2
All American Racers	Eagle 85GC (All except 4, 11, and 13–14) Lola T900 (4, 11, 13–14)	Cosworth DFX	2	(United States) Tom Sneva	All
All American Racers	Lola T900	Cosworth DFX	97	(United States) Tony Bettenhausen Jr.	2
All American Racers	Eagle 85GC (All except 3, 6) Lola T900 (3)	Cosworth DFX	98	(United States) Ed Pimm	All except 6
Kraco Racing	March 85C	Cosworth DFX	18	(United States) Kevin Cogan	All
Kraco Racing	March 85C	Cosworth DFX	99	(United States) Michael Andretti	All
Alex Morales Motorsports	March 85C	Cosworth DFX	21	(United States) Johnny Rutherford	All
Machinists Union Racing	March 85C	Cosworth DFX	55	(Mexico) Josele Garza	All
Machinists Union Racing	March 85C	Cosworth DFX	59	(United States) Pete Halsmer	2–6, 12
Machinists Union Racing	March 85C	Cosworth DFX	59	(United Kingdom) Rupert Keegan	10, 13, 15
Machinists Union Racing	March 85C	Cosworth DFX	59	(United States) Chip Ganassi	7
Galles Racing	March 85C	Buick V-6 (1-2); Cosworth DFX (3-15)	6	(United States) Pancho Carter	2–4, 6–7, 9, 11–12, 14
Galles Racing	March 85C	Buick V-6 (1-2); Cosworth DFX (3-15)	6	(Brazil) Roberto Moreno	5, 8, 10, 13, 15
Galles Racing	March 85C	Cosworth DFX	7	(Australia) Geoff Brabham	All
Team Cotter	March 85C	Cosworth DFX	9	(Colombia) Roberto Guerrero	All
Forsythe Racing	Lola T900	Cosworth DFX	32/33	(United States) Howdy Holmes	1-12
Forsythe Racing	Lola T900	Cosworth DFX	32/33	(Netherlands) Jan Lammers	13-15
Pace Racing	March 84C (1-6) Lola T900 (7-15)	Cosworth DFX	36	(Australia) Dennis Firestone	1-13
Pace Racing	March 84C (1-6) Lola T900 (7-15)	Cosworth DFX	36	(United Kingdom) Jim Crawford	14-15
Dick Simon Racing	March 85C	Cosworth DFX	22	(Brazil) Raul Boesel	1, 4–6, 8, 10, 13, 15
Dick Simon Racing	March 85C	Cosworth DFX	22	(United States) Dick Simon	2-3, 7, 9, 11–12, 14
Dick Simon Racing	March 85C	Cosworth DFX	23	(Brazil) Raul Boesel	2, 7
Dick Simon Racing	March 85C	Cosworth DFX	23	(United States) Dick Simon	5
Leader Card Racing	March 84C (1, 5) March 85C (4)	Cosworth DFX	24	(United States) Rocky Moran	1, 4-5
Leader Card Racing	March 84C (7) March 85C (2-3, 9)	Cosworth DFX	24	(United States) Tom Bigelow	2–3, 7, 9
Leader Card Racing	March 84C	Cosworth DFX	24	(United States) Phil Krueger	6
Leader Card Racing	March 85C	Cosworth DFX	24	(United States) Herm Johnson	8, 10
Leader Card Racing	March 85C	Cosworth DFX	24	(United States) Gary Bettenhausen	11–12, 14
Leader Card Racing	March 85C	Cosworth DFX	24	(United States) Dominic Dobson	13, 15
Canadian Tire Racing	March 85C	Cosworth DFX	67	(United Kingdom) Jim Crawford	11
Canadian Tire Racing	March 85C	Cosworth DFX	76	(Canada) Jacques Villeneuve Sr.	All except 2, 7, 9, and 12
Canadian Tire Racing	March 85C	Cosworth DFX	76	(United States) Johnny Parsons	2
Provimi Racing	Lola T900	Cosworth DFX	61	(Netherlands) Arie Luyendyk	All except 9-10
Arciero Racing	Lola T900 (All other races) March 85C (12, 15)	Cosworth DFX	12	(United States) Bill Whittington	All except 7, 9, 11, and 14
Arciero Racing	Lola T900 (All other races) March 85C (12, 15)	Cosworth DFX	12	(United States) Randy Lanier	14
Arciero Racing	Lola T900	Cosworth DFX	57	(United States) Randy Lanier	1–2, 4–6, 8, 10, 13, 15
Dale Coyne Racing	Lola T800	Chevy	19	(United States) Dale Coyne	All except 1 and 11
Gohr Racing	March 85C	Chevy	56	(United States) Steve Chassey	All except 1 and 11
Hemelgarn Racing	Lola T900 (All other races) March 85C (11)	Cosworth DFX	71	(Republic of Ireland) Michael Roe	1–2, 4-6
Hemelgarn Racing	Lola T900 (All other races) March 85C (11)	Cosworth DFX	71	(United States) Spike Gehlhausen	3, 7
Hemelgarn Racing	Lola T900 (All other races) March 85C (11)	Cosworth DFX	71	(Argentina) Enrique Mansilla	8, 10-11
Hemelgarn Racing	Lola T900 (All other races) March 85C (11)	Cosworth DFX	71	(United States) Scott Brayton	13-15
Part-time entries
Wysard Racing	Lola T900	Cosworth DFX	34	(United Kingdom) Jim Crawford	1–3, 5-6
Wysard Racing	Lola T900	Cosworth DFX	34	(United States) Darin Brassfield	15
Brayton Racing	March 85C	Cosworth DFX/Buick V-6	37	(United States) Scott Brayton	1–7, 9, 12
Interscope Racing	March 85C	Cosworth DFX	25	(United States) Danny Ongais	1–2, 6–7, 9, 12, 14-15
AMI Racing	March 85C	Cosworth DFX	43	(United States) John Paul Jr.	2, 6
AMI Racing	March 85C	Cosworth DFX	43	(Netherlands) Jan Lammers	4-5
Circle Bar Racing	Lola T900	Cosworth DFX	38	(United States) Chet Fillip	2–3, 6-7
Menard Cashway Lumber	March 85C	Cosworth DFX	8	(United States) Herm Johnson	2
Tom Hess Racing	Lola T800	Cosworth DFX	27 (29)	(United States) Dick Ferguson	1
Tom Hess Racing	Lola T900	Cosworth DFX	27 (29)	(Republic of Ireland) Derek Daly	2
Tom Hess Racing	Lola T900	Cosworth DFX	27 (29)	(United States) Jeff Wood	6
Tom Hess Racing	Lola T900	Cosworth DFX	27 (29)	(United Kingdom) Ian Ashley	15
Purcell Racing	March 83C	Cosworth DFX	50	(United States) Tom Bigelow	2
Purcell Racing	March 83C	Cosworth DFX	51	(United States) Phil Krueger	2
Gilmore Racing	March 85C (All other races) Lola T900 (11)	Cosworth DFX	14	(United States) A. J. Foyt	2, 5–7, 9, 11, 14-15
Gilmore Racing	March 84C	Cosworth DFX	41	(United States) Mike Nish	2, 14
Gilmore Racing	March 85C	Chevy	44	(United States) George Snider	2
Gilmore Racing	March 85C	Cosworth DFX	84	(United States) Chip Ganassi	2
Theodore Racing	Theodore	Cosworth DFX	15	(Brazil) Chico Serra	4

* The number in parentheses is the number the car used at the Indianapolis 500, if a different number was used.

=== Notable team and driver changes ===
- Rick Mears was sidelined due to injuries for much of the season. Danny Sullivan left Doug Shierson Racing to join Team Penske.
- Al Unser Jr. left Galles Racing to replace Sullivan at Doug Shierson Racing. He was replaced at Galles Racing by Geoff Brabham, who previously drove for Kraco Racing.
- Mayer Motor Racing, which ran 1984 with drivers Tom Sneva and Howdy Holmes, did not run in 1985. Tom Sneva moved to All American Racers, which expanded to a two car team, while Howdy Holmes moved to Forsythe Racing, who had run 1984 without a steady driver.
- Galles Racing expanded to a two car team. Joining Geoff Brabham, the second car was run by Pancho Carter on the ovals and rookie Roberto Moreno on the road courses.
- Bignotti-Cotter Racing changed its name to Team Cotter, continuing to field a car for Roberto Guerrero.
- Bill Whittington, who did not have a ride in 1984, joined Arciero Racing, replacing Pete Halsmer. Halsmer only ran a few races that year.
- Rookie Arie Luyendyk ran his first full season, driving for Provimi Veal Racing. He replaced Derek Daly, who was left without a full-time ride.
- Geoff Brabham was replaced at Kraco Racing by Kevin Cogan.
- Gordon Johncock retired just before pole day for the 1985 Indianapolis 500. Already scaled back to doing just ovals, while Bruno Giacomelli handled road and street courses, he was replaced by both Don Whittington and Sammy Swindell.
- Johnny Rutherford returned to full-time driving, replacing Al Holbert at Alex Morales Motorsports. Holbert returned to sports cars.
- Dick Simon scaled back to part-time driving. His ride at Dick Simon Racing was split with Raul Boesel.
- Stan Fox, who ran full-time in 1984, did not run in 1985. A variety of drivers are ran at Leader Card Racing.
- Interscope Racing and driver Danny Ongais only ran part-time in 1985.
- Tom Hess Racing, which drove most of 1984 with Dick Ferguson, also scaled back to part-time.

== Schedule ==
Icon	Legend
O	Oval/Speedway
R	Road course
S	Street circuit

Rd	Date	Name	Circuit	Location
1	April 14	(United States) Toyota Grand Prix of Long Beach	S Streets of Long Beach	Long Beach, California
2	May 26	(United States) Indianapolis 500	O Indianapolis Motor Speedway	Indianapolis, Indiana
3	June 2	(United States) Miller American 200 in Honor of Rex Mays	O Milwaukee Mile	West Allis, Wisconsin
4	June 16	(United States) Stroh's/G.I. Joe's 200	R Portland International Raceway	Portland, Oregon
5	June 30	(United States) U.S. Grand Prix at the Meadowlands	S Meadowlands Sports Complex	East Rutherford, New Jersey
6	July 7	(United States) Budweiser Cleveland Grand Prix	S Burke Lakefront Airport	Cleveland, Ohio
7	July 28**	(United States) Michigan 500	O Michigan International Speedway	Brooklyn, Michigan
8	August 4	(United States) Provimi Veal 200	R Road America	Elkhart Lake, Wisconsin
9	August 18	(United States) Domino's Pizza 500	O Pocono International Raceway	Long Pond, Pennsylvania
10	September 1	(United States) Escort Radar Warning 200	R Mid-Ohio Sports Car Course	Lexington, Ohio
11	September 8	(Canada) Molson Indy 300	O Sanair Super Speedway	Saint-Pie, Quebec
12	September 22	(United States) Detroit News 200	O Michigan International Speedway	Brooklyn, Michigan
13	October 6	(United States) Stroh's 300k	R Laguna Seca Raceway	Monterey, California
14	October 13*	(United States) Dana 150	O Phoenix International Raceway	Avondale, Arizona
15	November 9	(United States) Beatrice Indy Challenge	S Tamiami Park	Miami, Florida

* The Dana 150 was scheduled for March 31, but postponed on March 13 due to track damage sustained over winter testing. On August 6, it was rescheduled for an October 13 date.

** The Michigan 500 was scheduled for July 21, but postponed a week due to tire concerns. NBC did not return to televise the race.

== Results ==
Rd	Event name	Pole position	Winner	Winning team	Race time
1	Toyota Grand Prix of Long Beach	(United States) Mario Andretti	(United States) Mario Andretti	Newman/Haas Racing	1:42:50
2	Indianapolis 500	(United States) Pancho Carter	(United States) Danny Sullivan	Team Penske	3:16:06
3	Miller American 200 in Honor of Rex Mays	(United States) Mario Andretti	(United States) Mario Andretti	Newman/Haas Racing	1:36:38
4	Stroh's/G.I. Joe's 200	(United States) Danny Sullivan	(United States) Mario Andretti	Newman/Haas Racing	1:51:35
5	U.S. Grand Prix at the Meadowlands	(United States) Mario Andretti	(United States) Al Unser Jr.	Doug Shierson Racing	1:51:55
6	Budweiser Cleveland Grand Prix	(United States) Bobby Rahal	(United States) Al Unser Jr.	Doug Shierson Racing	1:45:31
7	Michigan 500	(United States) Rick Mears	(Brazil) Emerson Fittipaldi	Patrick Racing	3:53:58
8	Provimi Veal 200	(United States) Danny Sullivan	(Canada) Jacques Villeneuve Sr.	Canadian Tire Racing	1:45:12
9	Domino's Pizza 500	(United States) Rick Mears	(United States) Rick Mears	Team Penske	3:17:47
10	Escort Radar Warning 200	(United States) Bobby Rahal	(United States) Bobby Rahal	Truesports	1:52:23
11	Molson Indy 300	(United States) Bobby Rahal	(United States) Johnny Rutherford	Alex Morales Motorsports	2:03:54
12	Detroit News 200	(United States) Bobby Rahal	(United States) Bobby Rahal	Truesports	1:13:19
13	Stroh's 300k	(United States) Bobby Rahal	(United States) Bobby Rahal	Truesports	1:38:56
14	Dana 150	(United States) Al Unser	(United States) Al Unser	Team Penske	1:14:35
15	Beatrice Indy Challenge	(United States) Bobby Rahal	(United States) Danny Sullivan	Team Penske	2:04:59

* Indianapolis was USAC-sanctioned but counted towards the CART title.

=== Drivers points standings ===
Pos	Driver	LBH (United States)	INDY (United States)	MIL (United States)	POR (United States)	MEA (United States)	CLE (United States)	MIS1 (United States)	ROA (United States)	POC (United States)	MOH (United States)	SAN (Canada)	MIS2 (United States)	LAG (United States)	PHX (United States)	TAM (United States)	Pts
1	(United States) Al Unser	5	4		4	3	3	2*	7	3	27	13*	12	2	**1***	4	151
2	(United States) Al Unser Jr.	9	25	7	2*	1*	1	15	17*	2*	4	3	23	3	2	3	150
3	(United States) Bobby Rahal	27	27	9	20	25	**28**	6	4	4	**1***	**10**	**1***	**1***	6	**2***	133
4	(United States) Danny Sullivan	3	1	4	**27**	18	27	14	**13**	5	2	5	8	8	4	1	126
5	(United States) Mario Andretti	**1***	2*	**1***	1	**26**	14*	10		7	7	15	21	11	3	27	114
6	(Brazil) Emerson Fittipaldi	2	13	8	3	2	8	1	5	6	8	25	13	24	8	26	104
7	(United States) Tom Sneva	8	20	2	24	6	11	3	21	8	15	7	5	19	19	21	66
8	(Canada) Jacques Villeneuve Sr.	7	Wth	22	23	21	4		1		3	11		25	13	17	54
9	(United States) Michael Andretti	19	8	19	28	4	7	27	2	13	14	19	25	9	5	25	53
10	(United States) Rick Mears		21	3				**30**		**1**			2				51
11	(United States) Johnny Rutherford	10	6	23	9	14	15	4	DNS	14	22	1	9	21	26	19	51
12	(Mexico) Josele Garza	28	31	7	12	27	6	19	18	26	11	6	6	7	10	9	46
13	(United States) Ed Pimm	12	9	21	19	DNQ		5	11	20	9	8	3	14	9	12	45
14	(United States) Kevin Cogan	23	11	16	5	7	9	7	25	17	21	9	4	17	22	24	44
15	(Australia) Geoff Brabham	6	19	12	14	24	2	29	15	19	13	4	16	10	12	22	41
16	(United States) Pancho Carter	13	33	5	13		16	16		12		2	10		7		37
17	(Colombia) Roberto Guerrero	26	3	6	15	DNS	19	13	19	18	18	23	24	4	21	28	34
18	(Netherlands) Arie Luyendyk RY	17	7	17	21	10	5	Wth	6		DNS	18	15	22	25	7	33
19	(Italy) Bruno Giacomelli R	18			10	5	10		22		6	16		6		14	32
20	(United Kingdom) Jim Crawford	4	16	Wth		9	13					20			15	16	16
21	(United States) Bill Whittington	16	14	Wth	26	16	24		24		5		17	DNQ		8	15
22	(United States) Scott Brayton	11	30	DNQ	6	15	25	8		16			22	26	18	DNQ	15
23	(Australia) Alan Jones								3								14
24	(United States) Danny Ongais	DNQ	17					20		22			7		14	6	14
25	(United States) Howdy Holmes	14	10	11	17	13	22	9	10	21	16	21	18	DNS			12
26	(Netherlands) Jan Lammers				16	12								5	20	13	11
27	(Republic of Ireland) Michael Roe R	21	DNQ		7	8	26										11
28	(Brazil) Roberto Moreno R					28			16		25			16		5	10
29	(United States) Johnny Parsons		5														10
30	(Brazil) Raul Boesel R	20	18		11	11	12	28	8		23			20		23	10
31	(Argentina) Enrique Mansilla								9		10	12					8
32	(United States) Pete Halsmer		DNQ	15	8	19		Wth					11				7
33	(Australia) Dennis Firestone	22	DNQ	20	18	DNQ	21	11	20	9	17	14	DNS	23			6
34	(United States) Steve Chassey		DNQ	Wth	DNQ	20	DNQ	12	26	11	12		14	15	11	DNQ	6
35	(United Kingdom) Rupert Keegan R										19			12		10	4
36	(United States) Dick Simon	DNQ	26	13		17		25		10		17	19		DNQ	Wth	3
37	(United States) Chet Fillip		DNQ	10			18	17									3
38	(United States) Dominic Dobson					DNQ								18		11	2
39	(United States) Herm Johnson		Wth						12		24						1
40	(Republic of Ireland) Derek Daly		12														1
41	(United States) Randy Lanier	24	Wth		22	22	20		14		20			13	17	15	0
42	(United States) Spike Gehlhausen			14				18									0
43	(United States) John Paul Jr.		15				17										0
44	(United States) Phil Krueger		Wth				Wth	21		15							0
45	(United States) Rocky Moran R	15			DNQ	Wth											0
46	(United States) Gary Bettenhausen											22	Wth		16		0
47	(United States) Tom Bigelow		DNQ	18				26		23							0
48	(United Kingdom) Ian Ashley															18	0
49	(United States) A. J. Foyt		28			23		Wth		24		24			23	20	0
50	(United States) Don Whittington		24	DNQ				20					20		24		0
51	(United States) Chip Ganassi		22					22									0
52	(United States) Dale Coyne	DNQ		Wth	DNQ	DNQ	DNQ	24	23	27	28		Wth	27	DNQ	DNQ	0
53	(United States) Sammy Swindell							23		25							0
54	(United States) Rich Vogler		23														0
55	(United States) Jeff Wood						23										0
56	(United States) Dick Ferguson	25	DNQ														0
57	(Brazil) Chico Serra				25												0
58	(Canada) Ludwig Heimrath Jr. R										26						0
59	(United States) Tony Bettenhausen Jr.		29														0
60	(United States) George Snider		32														0
–	(United States) Jerry Karl		DNQ														-
–	(United States) Darin Brassfield R															DNQ	-
–	(United States) Mike Nish R		Wth												EX		-
–	(United States) Gordon Johncock		Wth														-
–	(United States) Frank Chianelli R									Wth							-
Pos	Driver	LBH (United States)	INDY (United States)	MIL (United States)	POR (United States)	MEA (United States)	CLE (United States)	MIS1 (United States)	ROA (United States)	POC (United States)	MOH (United States)	SAN (Canada)	MIS2 (United States)	LAG (United States)	PHX (United States)	TAM (United States)	Pts

Color	Result
Gold	Winner
Silver	2nd place
Bronze	3rd place
Green	4th-6th place
Light Blue	7th–12th place
Dark Blue	Finished (Outside Top 12)
Purple	Did not finish
Red	Did not qualify (DNQ)
Brown	Withdrawn (Wth)
Black	Disqualified (DSQ)
White	Did not start (DNS)
Blank	Did not participate (DNP)
Blank	Driver replacement (Rpl)
Blank	Injured (Inj)
Blank	Race not held (NH)
Blank	Not competing

**In-line notation**
**Bold**	Pole position
Italics	Ran fastest race lap
*	Led most race laps
RY	Rookie of the Year
R	Rookie

== See also ==
- 1985 Indianapolis 500
