= Formula Lightning =

Defunct electric car racing series

Formula Lightning was an electric car open-wheel, open cockpit formula racing series for University engineering programs that ran from 1994 to 2004 in the United States. The series was sponsored by ABB and a number of local and regional electric companies. For much of the duration of the series, the races were organized by Electric Vehicles Technology Competitions (EVTC) and sanctioned by SCCA Pro Racing.

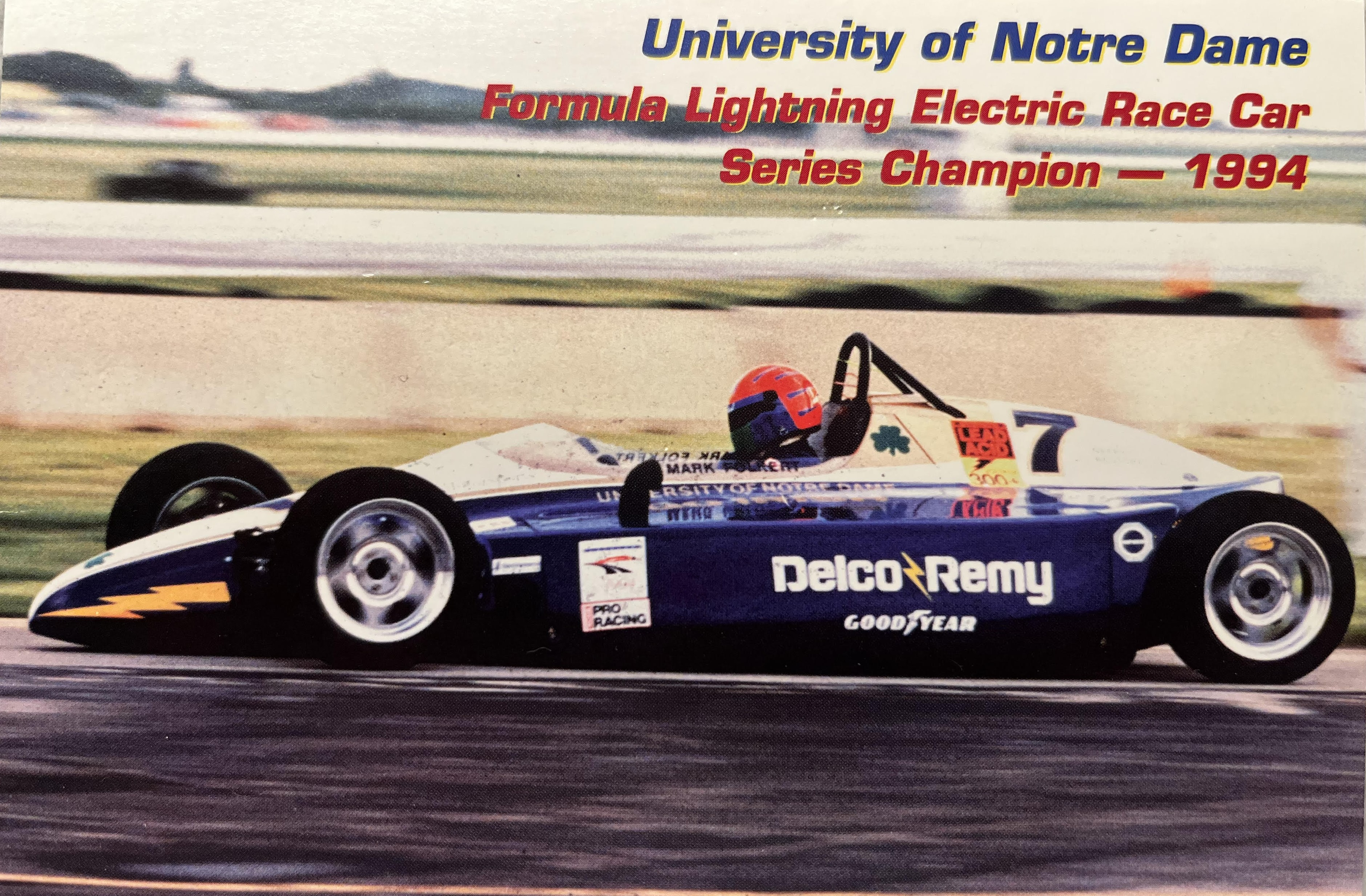

The motivation behind the series was to generate excitement amongst the public about electric vehicles. The hope was that focusing on high speed racing, rather than an endurance event, would get fans of motorsports like NASCAR and IndyCar to think favorably about electric vehicle technology. The race organizers also sought to inspire and train a generation of undergraduate engineers to become electric vehicle designers of the future.

The basic chassis of the vehicles was standardized and built by the Solar Electric Race Association (SERA). Universities across the country purchased these identical rolling chassis and then designed, developed, and built the electric drive systems needed to race. There were no changes allowed in the chassis design without majority approval of the Formula Lightning Owners Association. This ensured student teams could concentrate on the electric drive without the necessity of designing specialized mechanical chassis components.

The two predominant battery technologies used in the powertrains were lead-acid and nickel-cadmium. Most cars had somewhere around 1200 pounds of batteries, which were stored in the side-pods. The races were typically 25–50 miles long. Because of the speeds that the cars ran at and the state of battery technology at the time, more than one set of batteries were needed per race. Thus most teams planned at least one pit stop, which required 600 pounds of batteries to be removed from each side and replaced with a fully charged pack.

Professional drivers were hired to pilot the vehicles during the races and were able to reach speeds up to 140 mph (230 km/h). The series competed on both oval tracks (including Indianapolis Raceway Park and Richmond International Raceway) and road course race tracks (including Burke Lakefront Airport and Firebird Raceway in Phoenix).

The first race was held in July 1994 in support of the Grand Prix of Cleveland CART race with the University of Notre Dame winning the event. Throughout the decade-long series a number of universities participated including Bowling Green State University, IUPUI, University of Oklahoma, Ohio State University, Kettering University, and Arizona State University. The final official series race was held in October 2004 at Mid-Ohio Sports Car Course. Ohio State University was the leading series champion.

The race series stands as an important precursor to Formula E and the rise of other electric motorsports in the 2010s and 2020s, that happened alongside the broader spread of electric powered passenger vehicles.
