= Grand Prix of Cleveland =

Indy car event in the CART series

IndyCar/CART/Champ Car
- Location: Burke Lakefront Airport, Cleveland, Ohio, United States; 41°31′2″N 81°40′59″W
- First race: 1982
- Last race: 2007
- Previous names: Budweiser Cleveland 500 (1982–1983); Budweiser Cleveland Grand Prix (1984–1991); Budweiser Grand Prix of Cleveland (1992); Budweiser Grand Prix of Cleveland Presented by Dairy Mart (1993–1994); Medic Drug Grand Prix of Cleveland Presented by Dairy Mart (1995); Medic Drug Grand Prix of Cleveland (1996–1997); Medic Drug Grand Prix of Cleveland Presented by Star Bank (1998); Medic Drug Grand Prix of Cleveland Presented by Firstar (1999); Firstar Presents the Marconi Grand Prix of Cleveland (2000); Marconi Grand Prix of Cleveland Presented by Firstar (2001); Marconi Grand Prix of Cleveland Presented by U.S. Bank (2002); U.S. Bank Presents the Grand Prix of Cleveland (2003); U.S. Bank Presents the Champ Car Grand Prix of Cleveland (2004); Grand Prix of Cleveland Presented by U.S. Bank (2005–2006); Grand Prix of Cleveland Presented by LaSalle Bank (2007)
- Most wins (driver): Danny Sullivan (3); Emerson Fittipaldi (3); Paul Tracy (3)
- Most wins (team): Penske Racing (6)
- Most wins (manufacturer): Lola (8); Reynard (8)

Circuit information
- Surface: Concrete
- Length: 2.106 mi (3.389 km)
- Turns: 10

The Grand Prix of Cleveland was an American open-wheel car racing event in the CART series, held annually at Burke Lakefront Airport in Cleveland, Ohio, United States. The race was most recently held in 2007. After the 2008 open wheel unification, the 2008 race was cancelled.

Normally a fully functioning airport year-round, Burke Lakefront Airport was shut down for the week leading up to the event each year, requiring careful maintenance of the runways in order to keep them safe for cars at high speeds. The race was very popular amongst fans, as the long, wide runways (much wider and longer than typical courses) allowed for side-by-side racing, fast speeds, and superb passing zones around the entire track. The layout and overall flatness of the circuit also allowed a view of nearly the entire course from the grandstands. The track was less popular with drivers, as the runways were much bumpier than normal asphalt courses. The first turn, in which the runway narrowed and the cars turned at an almost 135º angle at the end of the front straight, was seen as one of the toughest in the circuit.

== History as a CART/ChampCar race ==
Originally known as the Budweiser Cleveland 500, it was first held on July 4, 1982, as part of the CART series. Kevin Cogan started from pole position; however, to the delight of the Cleveland crowd, local rookie driver Bobby Rahal (from nearby Medina) won the race.

From 1982 to 1989, the race was held on a 2.480 mi (3.991 km) layout. In 1990, the track configuration was abruptly changed. After practice, several cars were experiencing problems in a bumpy section in turns one and two. Prior to the start of the race, the track was slightly reconfigured, eliminating the left-right combination of turns one and two. The main straight was extended towards the location of what was turn three, which then became turn one. The new layout measured 2.369 mi (3.813 km), and the segment eliminated became instead an extended exit to the pit road. The new layout was then adopted permanently. In 1997 the track length was remeasured to 2.106 mi (3.389 km) without visible changes on the layout. The current layout is known for its turn 1 "vortex" at the start of races - after the green flag dropped, drivers would fan out on the wide concrete to gain position and then arrive at the corner sometimes five or six cars abreast, and all at once be "sucked" into the apex of the corner, frequently resulting in multi-car crashes at or just past the corner and leading to cars retiring before completing a single lap of the race.

Twice, in 1984 and 1990, a round of IROC was held as a support race. Formula Lightning also participated as a support race in the mid-1990s.

In 2007, it was announced the race would continue at Cleveland through to 2012. However, the race did not return in 2008 with the merger between Champ Car and IndyCar.

=== Naming rights ===
The event's name has changed several times over the years to reflect naming rights sponsors of the race. However, from 1984, the event's generic name was the Cleveland Grand Prix. The name was switched around in 1992 to the Grand Prix of Cleveland, and the race retained this name until its cancellation.

Budweiser held naming rights through 1994. Cleveland-based pharmacy chain Medic Drug owned the rights from 1995 to 1999, and Marconi from 2000 to 2002. Presenting sponsors included Cleveland-based convenience store chain Dairy Mart from 1993 to 1995, Cincinnati-based Star Bank in 1998, and Star Bank's successor Firstar from 1999 to 2001. Minneapolis-based U.S. Bank, the successor of Firstar, held the presenting sponsorship from 2002 to 2006, with LaSalle Bank being the final presenting sponsor in 2007.

=== 2006: 25th anniversary ===
The 25th running of the Grand Prix of Cleveland was held in June 2006. As well as the Champ Car race, scheduled support events included Champ Car Atlantic, Formula Ford 2000 and Touring Challenge for Corvettes. It was commemorated by a painting of memorable grand prix events, with the background being every winning car entering the first turn.

=== Indy Racing League controversy ===
The Cleveland Grand Prix nearly went to the IRL in 2000, but the plan was eventually scuttled. CART officials elected to drop the race from the schedule after a dispute with the promoter over the sanctioning fee.

On June 29, 1999, it was announced that the race would switch alliances and become an event on the Indy Racing League schedule for 2000. The original course layout would be transformed into an oval configuration approximately 1.2 miles in length. A three-year initial contract was signed. The decision was not well received by fans. Weeks later, however, it was determined that construction necessary for the oval configuration would require FAA approval, and the city deemed the improvements excessive and not enhancing to the airport. On September 9, 1999, Cleveland Mayor Michael R. White announced he was withdrawing his support of the project, and the IRL dropped the event. In 2000, the race returned as a Champ Car event on the original course.

=== Lap records ===
The all-time outright unofficial track record on the original circuit layout is 1:04.636 seconds, set by Mario Andretti in a Lola T89/00, during qualifying for the 1989 Budweiser Grand Prix of Cleveland. The outright track record on the later modified Grand Prix Circuit layout is 0:56.417 seconds, set by Jimmy Vasser in a Reynard 98I, during qualifying for the 1998 Medic Drug Grand Prix of Cleveland. The official race lap records at the Grand Prix of Cleveland are listed as:

Category	Time	Driver	Vehicle	Event
Modified Grand Prix Circuit (1990–2007): 2.106 mi (3.389 km)
Champ Car	0:57.508	Nelson Philippe	Lola B02/00	2006 Grand Prix of Cleveland
CART	0:58.473	Paul Tracy	Lola B02/00	2002 Marconi Grand Prix of Cleveland
Formula Atlantic	1:04.255	Andreas Wirth	Swift 016.a	2006 Cleveland Formula Atlantic round
Indy Lights	1:05.720	Sergio Paese	Lola T97/20	1998 Cleveland Indy Lights round
Trans-Am	1:12.071	Dorsey Schroeder	Ford Mustang Trans-Am	1997 Cleveland Trans-Am round
Barber Pro	1:13.661	Leonardo Maia	Reynard 98E	2003 Cleveland Barber Pro round
Formula BMW	1:16.483	Tommy Milner	Mygale FB02	2004 Cleveland Formula BMW USA round
Original Grand Prix Circuit (1982–1989): 2.480 mi (3.991 km)
CART	1:09.670	Emerson Fittipaldi	March 87C	1987 Budweiser Grand Prix of Cleveland
Indy Lights	1:13.902	Didier Theys	Wildcat-Buick	1987 Cleveland Indy Lights round
Trans-Am	1:20.217	Scott Pruett	Merkur XR4Ti	1988 Cleveland Trans-Am round

== Past race winners ==
Season	Race winner	Winning car	Winning team	Report
1982	(United States) Bobby Rahal	March-Ford-Cosworth	TrueSports	Report
1983	(United States) Al Unser	Penske-Cosworth	Penske Racing	Report
1984	(United States) Danny Sullivan	Lola-Cosworth	Doug Shierson Racing	Report
1985	(United States) Al Unser Jr.	Lola-Cosworth	Doug Shierson Racing	Report
1986	(United States) Danny Sullivan	March-Cosworth	Penske Racing	Report
1987	(Brazil) Emerson Fittipaldi	March-Chevrolet-Ilmor	Patrick Racing	Report
1988	(United States) Mario Andretti	Lola-Chevrolet-Ilmor	Newman/Haas Racing	Report
1989	(Brazil) Emerson Fittipaldi	Penske-Chevrolet-Ilmor	Patrick Racing	Report
1990	(United States) Danny Sullivan	Penske-Chevrolet-Ilmor	Penske Racing	Report
1991	(United States) Michael Andretti	Lola-Chevrolet-Ilmor	Newman/Haas Racing	Report
1992	(Brazil) Emerson Fittipaldi	Penske-Chevrolet-Ilmor	Penske Racing	Report
1993	(Canada) Paul Tracy	Penske-Chevrolet-Ilmor	Penske Racing	Report
1994	(United States) Al Unser Jr.	Penske-Ilmor	Penske Racing	Report
1995	(Canada) Jacques Villeneuve	Reynard-Ford-Cosworth	Team Green	Report
1996	(Brazil) Gil de Ferran	Reynard-Honda	Jim Hall Racing	Report
1997	(Italy) Alex Zanardi	Reynard-Honda	Chip Ganassi Racing	Report
1998	(Italy) Alex Zanardi	Reynard-Honda	Chip Ganassi Racing	Report
1999	(Colombia) Juan Pablo Montoya	Reynard-Honda	Chip Ganassi Racing	Report
2000	(Brazil) Roberto Moreno	Reynard-Ford-Cosworth	Patrick Racing	Report
2001	(United Kingdom) Dario Franchitti	Reynard-Honda	Team KOOL Green	Report
2002	(Canada) Patrick Carpentier	Reynard-Ford-Cosworth	Team Player's	Report
2003	(France) Sébastien Bourdais	Lola-Ford-Cosworth	Newman/Haas Racing	Report
2004	(France) Sébastien Bourdais	Lola-Ford-Cosworth	Newman/Haas Racing	Report
2005	(Canada) Paul Tracy	Lola-Ford-Cosworth	Forsythe Championship Racing	Report
2006	(United States) A. J. Allmendinger	Lola-Ford-Cosworth	Forsythe Racing	Report
2007	(Canada) Paul Tracy	Panoz-Cosworth	Forsythe Racing	Report

== Lights/Atlantics winners ==
Season	Series	Race winner
1987	American Racing Series	(Belgium) Didier Theys
1988	American Racing Series	(Argentina) Juan Manuel Fangio II
1990	American Racing Series	(Canada) Paul Tracy
1991	Indy Lights	(United States) Mark Smith
1992	Indy Lights	(France) Franck Fréon
1993	Indy Lights	(United States) Bryan Herta
1994	Indy Lights	(United States) Eddie Lawson
1995	Indy Lights	(Canada) Greg Moore
1996	Indy Lights	(Brazil) Gualter Salles
1997	Atlantic Championship	(Canada) Bertrand Godin
1998	Atlantic Championship	(Canada) Kenny Wilden
1998	Indy Lights	(Brazil) Luiz Garcia Jr.
1999	Indy Lights	(Republic of Ireland) Derek Higgins
2000	Atlantic Championship	(United States) Buddy Rice
2001	Atlantic Championship	(Brazil) Hoover Orsi
2002	Atlantic Championship	(United States) Ryan Hunter-Reay
2003	Atlantic Championship	(United States) A. J. Allmendinger
2004	Atlantic Championship	(United Kingdom) Ryan Dalziel
2005	Atlantic Championship	(Netherlands) Charles Zwolsman
2005	Atlantic Championship	(Netherlands) Charles Zwolsman
2006	Atlantic Championship	(United States) Graham Rahal
2006	Atlantic Championship	(United States) Graham Rahal
2007	Atlantic Championship	(Brazil) Raphael Matos
