= Provimi =

Dutch animal feed supplement company

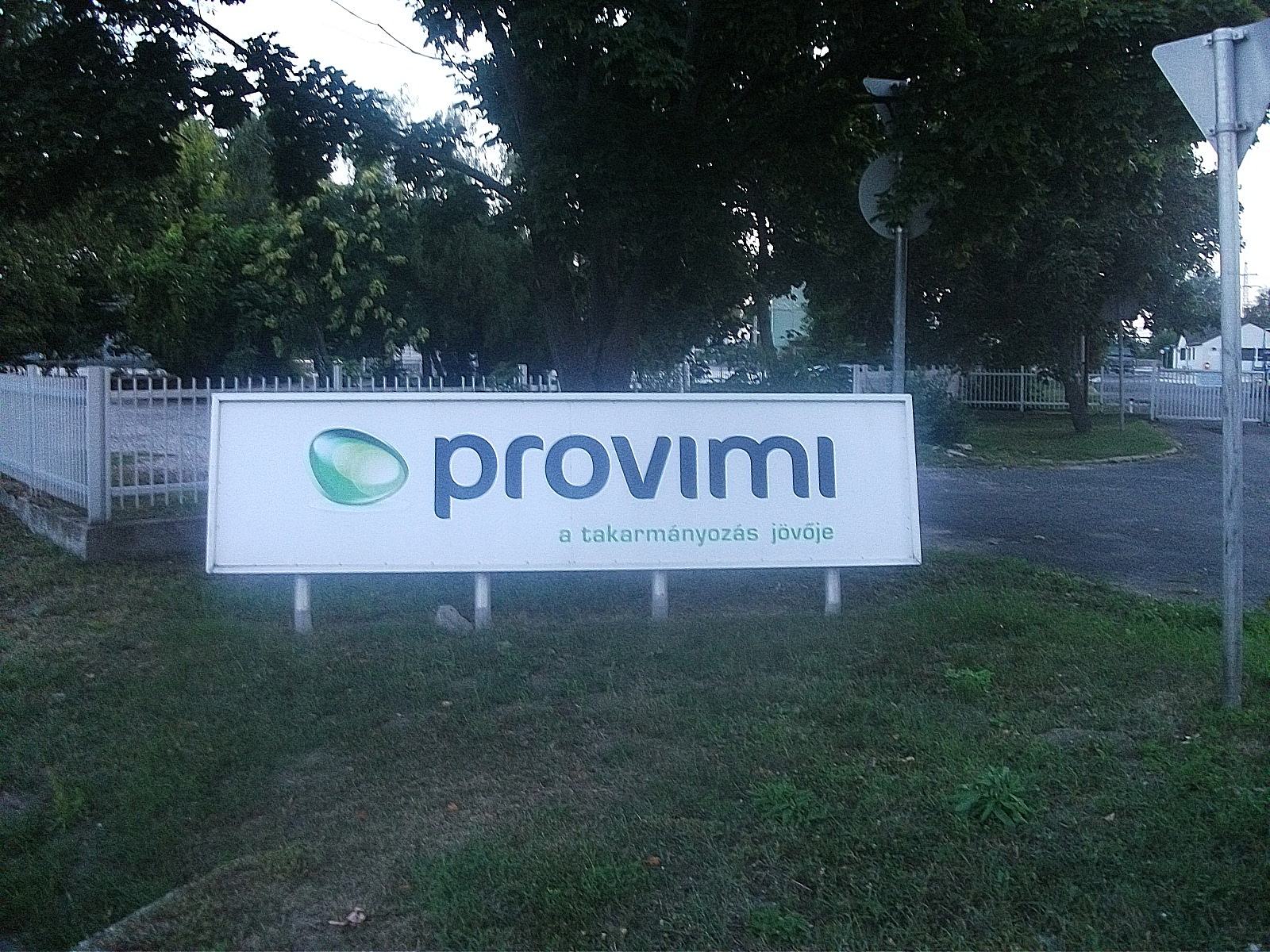
Logo of Provimi in Zichyújfalu

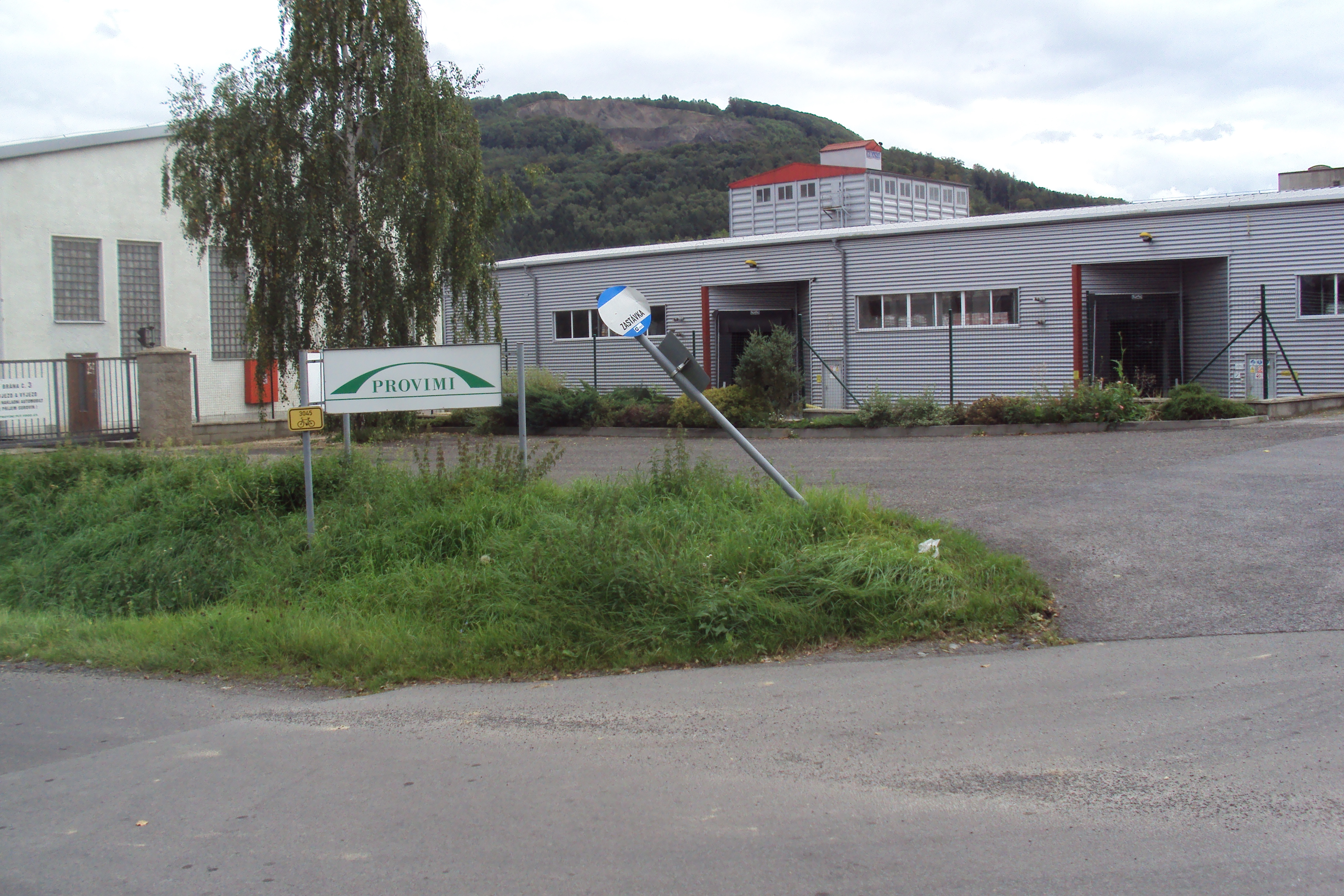
Provimi in Brniště

Provimi is a company specializing in animal nutrition and related products. In the 1930s it started selling a product under the name Provimi, a mixture of three basic elements in every animal feed and this is where the present name is derived from: Proteins, Vitamins and Minerals. The company is of Dutch origin and headquartered in Rotterdam.

== History ==
Provimi was founded near Rotterdam, the Netherlands in 1927, where it started up as a trading company for Dutch farmers.

In 1971, the American agricultural company Central Soya bought Provimi. In 1988, Central Soya was taken over by Eridania Béghin-Say Group, a large French agribusiness conglomerate. In the years to follow, Provimi went through a period of internal and worldwide external expansion until 2001, when the Eridania Béghin-Say Group was broken into four companies, one of which was Provimi.

In 2002, Provimlux, a holding company jointly controlled by funds advised by CVC Capital Partners and PAI Partners, acquired the 53.66% majority shareholding of Provimi. After the subsequent execution of a standing offer, Provimlux held 74.05% of Provimi, which remained listed on Euronext. In the years to follow, Provimi continued its external growth.

In April 2007, Permira bought the majority of Provimi's shares from CVC Capital Partners and PAI Partners. The Provimi Group was delisted from the Euronext Stock Exchange in Paris on 6 November 2009 and is wholly owned by KoroFrance SAS, a company indirectly controlled by investment funds managed or advised by Permira Advisers LLP.

In November 2011 the company was acquired by Cargill for €1.5 billion ($2.1 billion US).
