= 1986 Champ Car season =

The 1986 Champ Car season may refer to:

- the 1985–86 USAC Championship Car season, which was just one race, the 70th Indianapolis 500
- the 1986 CART PPG Indy Car World Series, sanctioned by CART, who would later become Champ Car
