= Josele Garza =

Mexican racing driver

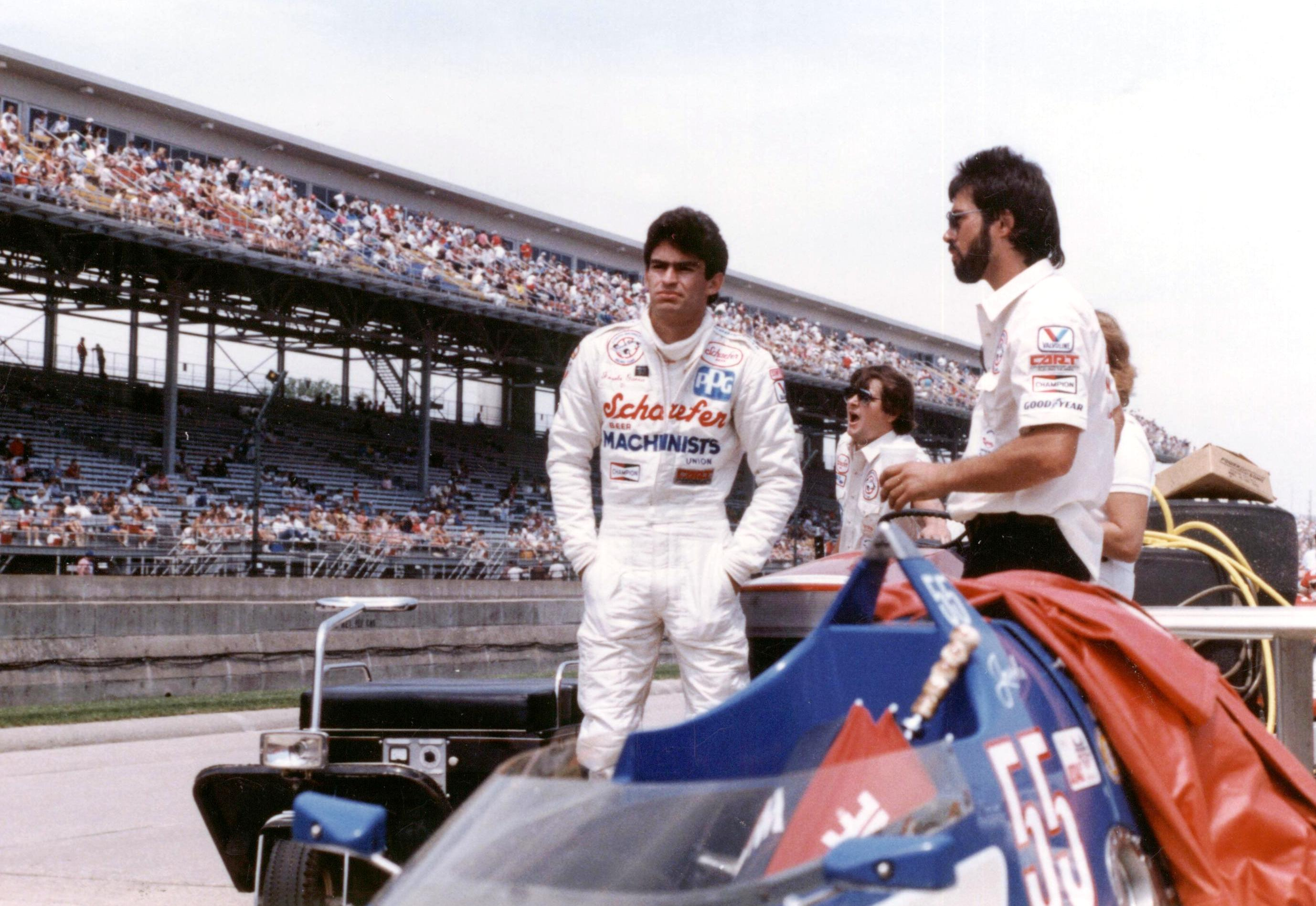
- Garza at the 1986 Indianapolis 500
- Nationality: (Mexico) Mexican
- Born: Josele Garza Martínez; March 15, 1962 (age 64) Mexico City, Mexico

IndyCar Series
- Years active: 1981 – 1987
- Teams: Garza Racing (22 starts); Machinists Union Racing (66 starts)
- Starts: 88
- Wins: 0
- Poles: 0
- Best finish: 2nd Michigan 500 in 1986

Awards
- 1981

Josele Garza Martínez (born March 15, 1962, in Mexico City, Mexico) is a Mexican professional race car driver. He started seven Indianapolis 500 races. Garza was the 1981 Indianapolis 500 Rookie of the Year after starting sixth, leading 13 laps, and finishing 23rd at the age of nineteen. At nineteen years, two months, and nine days, Garza is the second youngest driver to compete in the Indianapolis 500 and was not surpassed until 2003 by A. J. Foyt IV. USAC rules at the time required drivers to be 21 years of age, but Garza's racing license listed him as being 22 years old. Garza claims he does not know how the error occurred, but he did not notify officials of the error. He finished tenth in the 1984 Indianapolis 500.

Garza was winless in 88 CART races. His best career finish was a second place at the 1986 Michigan 500. In 1987, he tested a Brabham Formula One car, during free practice of the 1987 Mexican Grand Prix. After he finished his career in CART, he tested with Minardi in F1 during 1987-1988 but never got the required sponsorship to be awarded a race seat and he never made his debut in F1. He came back to Mexico and later he became a team owner in Mexican F2 and F3000 and sometimes raced when his drivers were not up to standard, or absent for some reason.

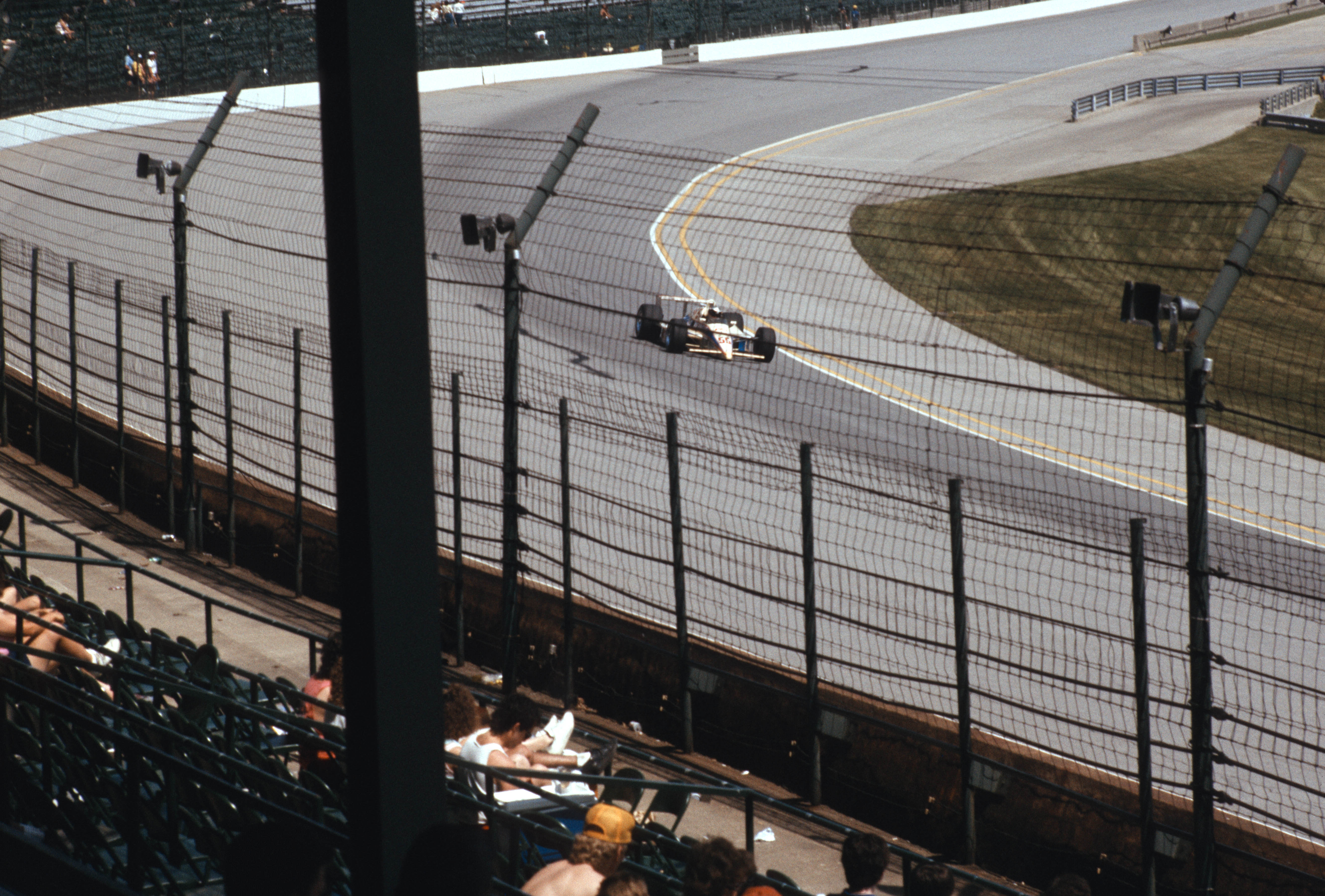
Garza qualifying for the 1987 Indianapolis 500

== Racing record ==
=== Complete USAC Mini-Indy Series results ===
Year	Entrant	1	2	3	4	5	6	Pos	Points
1980	David Psachie	MIL; 19	POC; 1	MOH; 16	MIN1; 2	MIN2; 2	ONT; 24	**3rd**	**532**

=== Complete Formula One World Championship results ===
(key) (Races in bold indicate pole position / Races in italics indicate fastest lap)

Yr	Entrant	Chassis	Engine	1	2	3	4	5	6	7	8	9	10	11	12	13	14	15	16	WDC	Points
1986	Motor Racing Developments Ltd.	Brabham BT55	BMW Straight-4 (t/c)	BRA	ESP	SMR	MON	BEL	CAN	DET	FRA	GBR	GER	HUN	AUT	ITA	POR	MEX; PO	AUS	–	–

=== CART ===
(key) (Races in bold indicate pole position)

Year	Team	1	2	3	4	5	6	7	8	9	10	11	12	13	14	15	16	17	Rank	Points	Ref
1981	Garza Racing	PHX; 21	MIL; 14	ATL; 12	ATL; 18	MCH; 19	RIV; 12	MIL; 8	MCH; 23	WGL; 24	MEX; 18	PHX; 6							21st	30	
1982	Garza Racing	PHX; 13	ATL; 16	MIL; 8	CLE; 14	MCH; 22	MIL; 8	POC; 15	RIV; 13	ROA; 4	MCH; 9	PHX; 18							13th	56	
1983	Machinists Union Racing	ATL	INDY	MIL	CLE; 17	MCH; 19	ROA; 11	POC; 9	RIV; 20	MOH; 23	MCH; 17	CPL; 11	LAG; 12	PHX					22nd	9	
1984	Machinists Union Racing	LBH; 23	PHX; DNS	INDY; 10	MIL; DNS	POR; 7	MEA; 23	CLE; 17	MCH; 11	ROA; 7	POC; 25	MOH; 11	SAN; 4	MCH; 10	PHX; 8	LAG; 13	LVS; 10		13th	42	
1985	Machinists Union Racing	LBH; 28	INDY; 31	MIL; 7	POR; 12	MEA; 27	CLE; 6	MCH; 19	ROA; 18	POC; 26	MOH; 11	SAN; 6	MCH; 6	LAG; 7	PHX; 10	MIA; 9			12th	46	
1986	Machinists Union Racing	PHX; 23	LBH; 7	INDY; 18	MIL; 7	POR; 17	MEA; 8	CLE; 7	TOR; 23	MCH; 2	POC; 7	MOH; 14	SAN	MCH	ROA	LAG	PHX	MIA; 24	14th	45	
1987	Machinists Union Racing	LBH; 5	PHX; 6	INDY; 17	MIL; 22	POR; 6	MEA; 24	CLE; 16	TOR; 17	MCH; 12	POC; 11	ROA; 11	MOH; 8	NAZ; 8	LAG; 8	MIA; 18			11th	46	

== Indianapolis 500 results ==
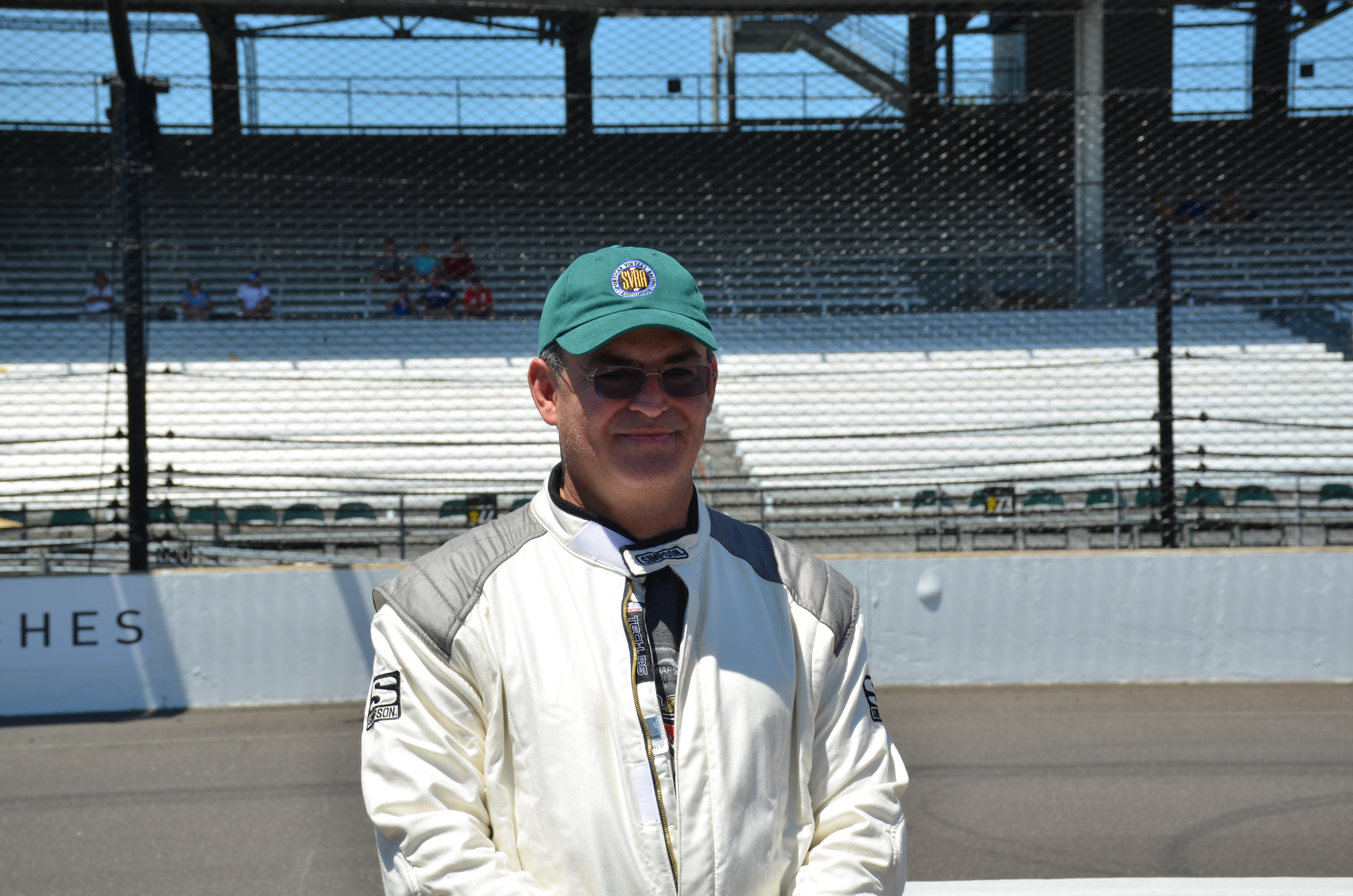
Josele Garza at the 2016 Brickyard SVRA Pro-Am race at the Indianapolis Motor Speedway.

Year	Chassis	Engine	Start	Finish
1981	Penske	Cosworth	6th	23rd
1982	March	Cosworth	33rd	29th
1983	Penske	Cosworth	18th	25th
1984	March	Cosworth	24th	10th
1985	March	Cosworth	18th	31st
1986	March	Cosworth	17th	18th
1987	March	Cosworth	25th	17th

Sporting positions
Preceded by Tim Richmond	Indianapolis 500; Rookie of the Year; 1981	Succeeded by Jim Hickman
