= Mike Nish =

American racing driver (born 1959)

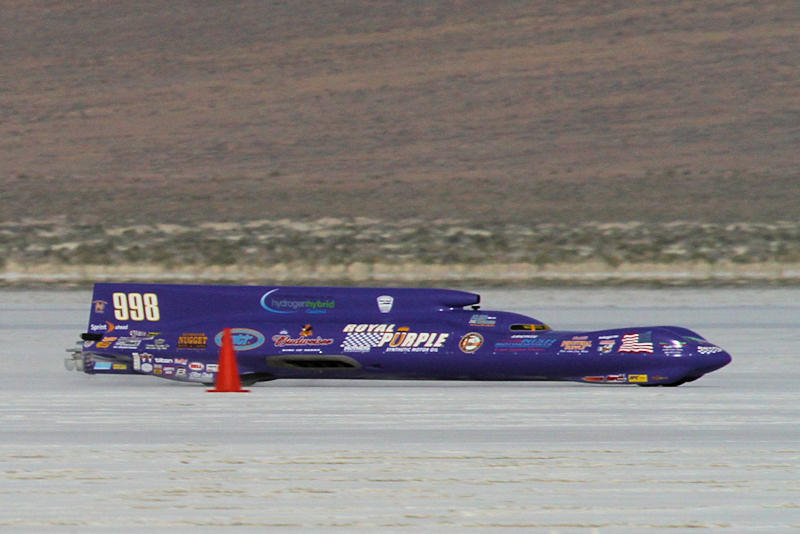
Mike Nish at speed in the Royal Purple 'Frankenstein' streamliner, September 2010 (Photo by Ray the Rat)

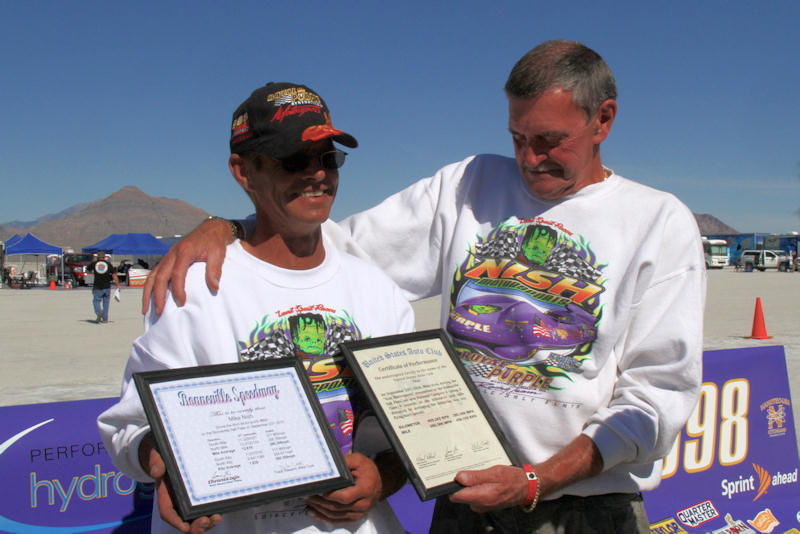
Mike (and father Terry) receiving FIA certificate of record, September 2010 (Photo by Ray the Rat)

Mike Nish (December 10, 1959 – December 14, 2022) was an American racing driver who competed in the CART Indy car series and competed in world land speed record events.

Nish competed in four CART races, one in 1984 at Phoenix International Raceway, and three more in 1986, where he recorded his best finish of tenth place at Portland. He attempted to qualify for the Indianapolis 500 in 1985 and 1986, but failed in both years. At Speed Week in August 2007, Nish captured the SCTA AA/FS (Unlimited Fuel Streamliner) record with a speed of 377.715 mph (607.8732 km/h). He was also awarded the Hot Rod Trophy for achieving the top speed of the meet on the Bonneville Salt Flats.

On October 8, 2007, Nish attempted to break the world land speed record for carbureted vehicles set in 1965, but his engine failed after 30 seconds. Mike Nish, as well as his father Terry and brothers Jeff and T. J. have successfully broken 14 different world land speed records over the years.

On September 23, 2010, Nish broke the world land speed record for the FIA Category A, Group 2, Class 9, 1 Kilometer, Flying Start and Category A, Group 2, Class 9, 1 mile, Flying Start class with a speed of 285.359 mph (459.242 km/h) for the Kilometer and 285.305 mph (459.155 km/h) in the mile.

== American open–wheel racing results ==
(key)

=== PPG Indycar Series ===
(key) (Races in bold indicate pole position)

Year	Team	1	2	3	4	5	6	7	8	9	10	11	12	13	14	15	16	17	Rank	Points	Ref
1984	Dick Simon Racing	LBH	PHX	INDY	MIL	POR	MEA	CLE	MCH	ROA	POC	MDO	SAN	MCH	PHX; 15	LAG	CPL; DNQ		**NC**	**0**	
1985	A. J. Foyt Enterprises	LBH	INDY; DNQ	MIL	POR	MEA	CLE	MCH	ROA	POC	MDO	SAN	MCH	LAG	PHX; EX	MIA			NC	-	
1986	A. J. Foyt Enterprises	PHX	LBH	INDY; DNQ															**30th**	**3**	
1986	Machinists Union Racing				MIL; DNS	POR; 10	MEA; 25	CLE; Rpl^{1}	TOR; 22	MCH	POC	MDO	SAN	MCH	ROA	LAG	PHX	MIA	**30th**	**3**	
1987	Machinists Union Racing	LBH; DNQ	PHX; DNQ	INDY	MIL	POR	MEA	CLE	TOR	MCH	POC	ROA	MDO	NAZ	LAG	MIA			NC	-	

^{1} Replaced by Johnny Parsons

=== Indianapolis 500 ===
Year	Chassis	Engine	Start	Finish	Team
1985	March	Cosworth	DNQ		A. J. Foyt Enterprises
1986	March	Chevy V6	DNQ		A. J. Foyt Enterprises
