= A. J. Foyt Racing =

American racecar team

(United States) A. J. Foyt Enterprises
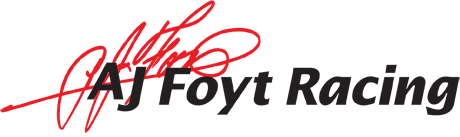
- Owner(s): A. J. Foyt
- Principal(s): Larry Foyt
- Base: Speedway, Indiana
- Series: IndyCar Series; Indy NXT
- Race drivers: IndyCar Series: 4. (United States) Josh Pierson; 14. (Norway) Dennis Hauger; Indy NXT: 4. (United Kingdom) Bart Harrison; 14. TBA
- Manufacturer: Chevrolet
- Opened: 1965

Career
- Drivers' Championships: 5 (1967, 1975, 1979 USAC, 1996, 1998 IRL)
- Indy 500 victories: 3 (1967, 1977, 1999)

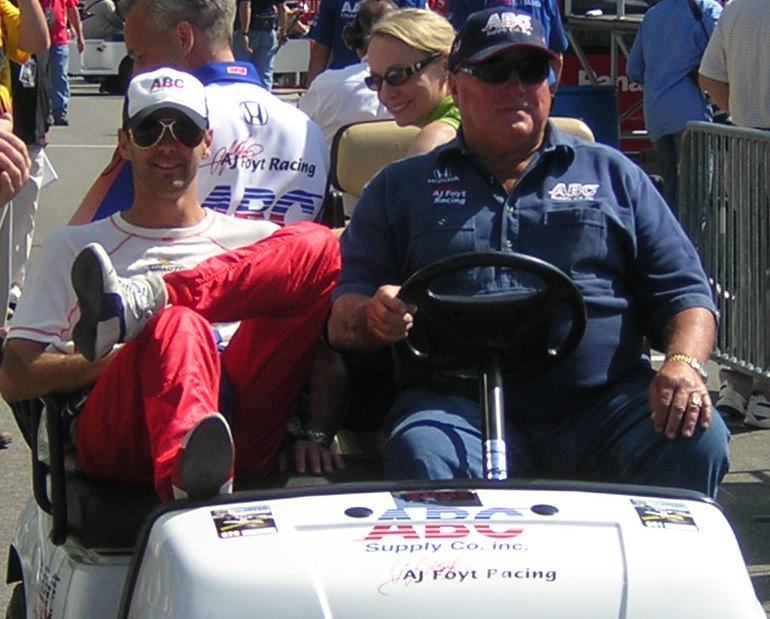
A. J. Foyt (right) and former driver Darren Manning (left) at the 2007 Indianapolis 500

A. J. Foyt Enterprises, competing and doing business as A. J. Foyt Racing, is an American racing team which competes in the IndyCar Series and formerly competed in NASCAR. It is owned by four-time Indianapolis 500 winner, 1972 Daytona 500 winner, 1967 24 Hours of Le Mans winner, and two-time 24 Hours of Daytona winner A. J. Foyt. Foyt won two of his four Indianapolis 500s driving for the team. The team also won the 1999 Indianapolis 500 and the IRL championship in 1996 and 1998.

== USAC National Championship ==
The team was founded in 1965 and won three National Championship (in 1967, 1975 and 1979) and two Indianapolis 500 (in 1967 and 1977), all with A. J. Foyt at the wheel.

== CART ==
During the CART years, A. J. Foyt Enterprises seldom ran a full-season schedule. The team ran partial schedules through 1987, with A. J. Foyt himself driving the primary car. The team usually entered all three 500-mile races (Indianapolis, Michigan, and Pocono), and selected races, mostly on ovals. The team ran cars for additional drivers, particularly at Indy, including George Snider, Davy Jones, Stan Fox, Rocky Moran and others. At the 1987 Indianapolis 500 the Foyt team notably qualified four team cars, with Foyt starting 4th, and Fox finishing 7th.

In 1988, the team increased its participation and went back to a full-time schedule. Foyt posted four top-five finishes between 1988-1990. A devastating crash at Road America in 1990 saw Foyt suffer serious leg injuries, and he required lengthy rehabilitation. Foyt returned in 1991 and retired in May 1993. The team ran nine different drivers in 1992, then signed promising rookie Robby Gordon for the 1993 season. Gordon notched ten top-ten finishes including a 2nd place at Mid-Ohio.

For 1994, the team initially signed Davy Jones, but parted ways with him after only three races. At Indianapolis, they picked up rookie Bryan Herta mid-month, and survived a Bump Day scare to hold on and make the field. Herta posted a 9th place finish on race day and ran four additional races with the team. The team then hired Eddie Cheever to finish out the 1994 season. Cheever stayed with the team for 1995 but saw little success.

A. J. Foyt Enterprises never won a CART-sanctioned event during its participation from 1979 to 1995. At the 1995 Bosch Spark Plug Grand Prix, Eddie Cheever was leading the race with just over one lap to go when the car ran out of fuel. It would be the closest the team came to winning a CART race. The team's best CART series finish was 2nd place, on two occasions.

== IndyCar Series ==
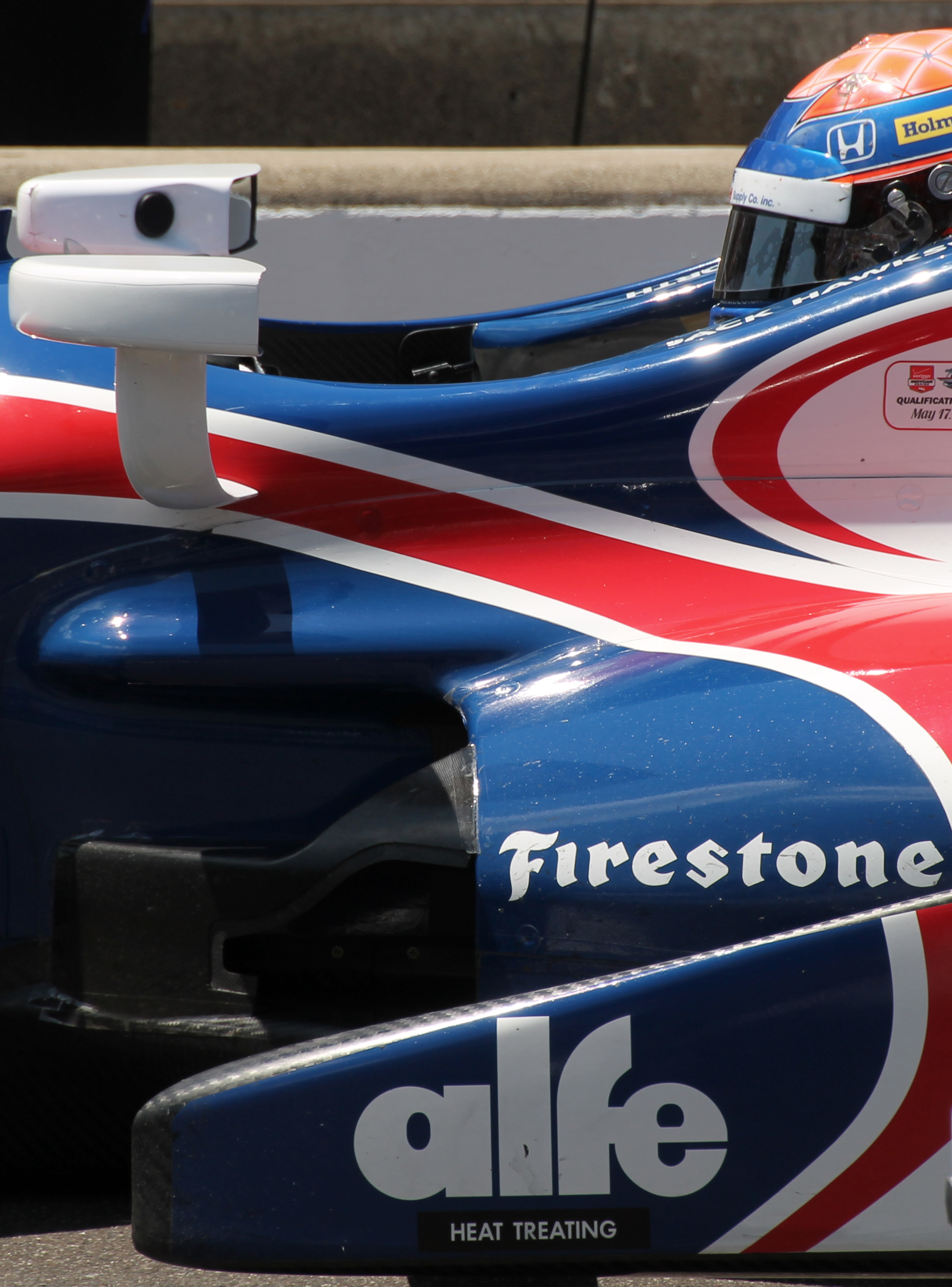
Jack Hawksworth participating in the Pit Stop Challenge at the Indianapolis Motor Speedway in 2015.

Foyt Enterprises won IRL titles in 1996 with Scott Sharp and 1998 with Kenny Bräck. Bräck also won the Indianapolis 500 for the team in 1999.

In 2006 the team hoped to resurrect itself with experienced driver Felipe Giaffone and a more level playing ground brought by a spec engine. However, after a strong start to the season, the team struggled after the Indianapolis 500 and parted ways with Giaffone after the eighth race. Jeff Bucknum was brought in to fill the seat for the rest of the year.

In 2007 Foyt announced that Larry Foyt would take over as team manager and Darren Manning was signed as the team's driver. Manning captured three top-five finishes in his two years with the team, including a second place in 2008 at Watkins Glen International. However, with high-profile veteran Vítor Meira becoming available following the 2008 season, Foyt signed him to replace Manning.

Foyt Enterprises began the 2009 IndyCar Series season sponsored by ABC Supply and fielding Vítor Meira, who was injured in the Indianapolis 500. Ryan Hunter-Reay and Paul Tracy took over driving duties for the rest of the 2009 season. Meira returned in 2010 but split with the team after the season. Japanese driver Takuma Sato joined Foyt's team in 2013, winning that year at Long Beach. The team announced in October that they would field a second car (No. 41) full-time in 2015 for Jack Hawksworth.

In 2017, A. J. Foyt Racing switched to customer Chevrolet engines after eleven seasons utilized works Honda engines since 2006.

For the balance of its 2021 IndyCar campaign, Foyt Enterprises fielded two full-time drivers, Sébastien Bourdais alongside Dalton Kellett, with part-timers Charlie Kimball and J. R. Hildebrand in spare chassis designated for Indianapolis, only.

After the string of ups and downs, in 2023 Foyt would enter a technical partnership with Team Penske.

== NASCAR Cup Series ==
=== No. 14 history ===
The No. 14 started as the No. 50 when A. J. Foyt began fielding NASCAR teams in 1973 part-time, driving the Purolator-sponsored Chevrolet. He drove for the team on a very limited schedule throughout the seventies, picking up one pole and nine top-tens. Ron Hutcherson was the first driver besides Foyt to drive the car, and later Johnny Rutherford drove for the team in 1978. In the 1980s, Foyt was almost the sole driver of the team, and switched to the No. 14 with a Valvoline sponsorship in 1983, and posted his final career Top 5 at Talladega two years later in the Copenhagen-sponsored car. In 1989, Tracy Leslie drove for the team in a pair of races, finishing 20th at Michigan International Speedway. Foyt did not drive in the 1991 season. Instead, he allowed Mike Chase to drive for him. This driver finished no better than 25th. Foyt, afterward, did not field a team until the inaugural Brickyard 400 in 1994, when he qualified 40th and finished 30th in the No. 50. Foyt would attempt the Brickyard in 1995 and 1996 but did not qualify for either race, forcing his permanent retirement.

During the 1999 season, rumors began spreading that Foyt would revive his defunct operation to compete in the Cup Series. After several months, it was announced that Foyt would hire rookie Mike Bliss as the driver of the No. 14 Conseco-sponsored Pontiac Grand Prix. Bliss qualified for the Daytona 500, but after failing to do so for the next three races, he was released and briefly replaced by Dick Trickle. After getting an offer from another team, Trickle would leave as well. He would be replaced by Rick Mast after he and several crew members left the bankrupt Larry Hedrick Motorsports team. Mast stayed with the team for the rest of the season and had two Top 10s at Pocono and Bristol. In 2001, Ron Hornaday Jr. was selected as the team's driver, but he only posted only one Top 10 in Las Vegas and was dismissed at the end of the season.

Following Hornaday's departure, Stacy Compton began driving for the team starting in 2002. After posting only three Top 20 finishes, Compton left the team, and P. J. Jones took over at the Sirius Satellite Radio at the Glen, and posted the team's best finish of fourth. Mike Wallace was then designated as the driver, posting a 10th-place run at Bristol Motor Speedway. It had been originally announced Foyt would field two cars in 2003 with Wallace in the 14, and his adopted son Larry Foyt in a second car with sponsorship from Harrah's. Unfortunately, Conseco filed for bankruptcy, leaving only one car with Larry driving. The team also switched its Cup team to Dodge with engines provided by Evernham Motorsports. Foyt only qualified for 20 races with a best finish of 16th and finished 41st in points. Harrah's left at the end of 2003, and Larry Foyt qualified for three races in 2004 but did not obtain major sponsorship, leaving the team inactive. Later in the season, Foyt sold his owner's points to ppc Racing's new Cup team. A. J. Foyt Racing officially closed their Cup team in 2006, following an auction of the team's NASCAR equipment in August.

=== No. 41 history ===
Foyt Racing also briefly expanded to a two-car team at the 2000 season finale, the NAPA 500, when they fielded the No. 41 for Foyt's son Larry but did not make the race.

The team also ran a second car again in 2001 at Atlanta Motor Speedway, with Mark Green driving, but did not qualify.

The team also ran a second car yet again in 2002 at Indianapolis Motor Speedway, with P. J. Jones but the number changed from No. 41 to No. 50.

== NASCAR Xfinity Series ==
=== No. 14 history ===
In 2001, Foyt started a Busch team, the No. 14 Harrah's Chevrolet, driven by Larry Foyt. Despite failing to finish in the top ten, Foyt finished 22nd in points overall.

In the Busch Series for 2002, Foyt had two top-tens and improved two spots in the points.

== Racing results ==
=== Complete CART Indy Car World Series results ===
(key)

Year	Chassis	Engine	Drivers	No.	1	2	3	4	5	6	7	8	9	10	11	12	13	14	15	16	17	Pts Pos	Pts
1979					PHX	ATL		INDY	TRT		MCH		WGL	TRT	ONT	MCH	ATL	PHX					
1979	Parnelli VPJ6C	Cosworth DFX V8t	(United States) A. J. Foyt	14				2														NC	—
1980					ONT	INDY	MIL	POC	MDO	MCH	WGL	MIL	ONT	MCH	MXC	PHX							
1980	Parnelli VPJ6C	Cosworth DFX V8t	(United States) A. J. Foyt	14	DNS	14		19														44th	**45**
1980	Parnelli VPJ6C	Cosworth DFX V8t	(United States) George Snider	16		15		DNQ														48th	**25**
1981					PHX	MIL	ATL		MCH	RIV	MIL	MCH	WGL	MXC	PHX								
1981	Coyote 81	Cosworth DFX V8t	(United States) A. J. Foyt	14								26										45th	**0**
1982					PHX	ATL	MIL	CLE	MCH	MIL	POC	RIV	ROA	MCH	PHX								
1982	March 82C	Cosworth DFX V8t	(United States) A. J. Foyt	14			2	22	20		20			23								28th	**22**
1983					ATL	INDY	MIL	CLE	MCH	ROA	POC	RIV	MDO	MCH	CPL	LAG	PHX						
1983	March 83C	Cosworth DFX V8t	(United States) George Snider	1		32																59th	**0**
1983	March 83C	Cosworth DFX V8t	(United States) A. J. Foyt	14		31																58th	**0**
1984					LBH	PHX	INDY	MIL	POR	MEA	CLE	MCH	ROA	POC	MDO	SAN	MCH	PHX	LAG	CPL			
1984	March 84C	Cosworth DFX V8t	(United States) George Snider	4			11															38th	**2**
1984	March 84C	Cosworth DFX V8t	(United States) A. J. Foyt	14			6			DNQ		22		27			DNS	14		22		31st	**8**
1984	March 84C	Cosworth DFX V8t	(United States) Johnny Rutherford	84			22					7		28								22nd	**20**
1985					LBH	INDY	MIL	POR	MEA	CLE	MCH	ROA	POC	MDO	SAN	MCH	LAG	PHX	MIA				
1985	March 85C; Lola T900	Cosworth DFX V8t	(United States) A. J. Foyt	14		28			23				24		24			23	20			49th	**0**
1985	March 85C	Chevrolet V6t	(United States) George Snider	44		32																60th	**0**
1985	March 85C	Cosworth DFX V8t	(United States) Chip Ganassi	84		22																51st	**0**
1985	March 85C	Cosworth DFX V8t	(United States) Mike Nish **(R)**	84														EX				NC	—
1985	March 84C	Cosworth DFX V8t	(United States) Mike Nish **(R)**	41		DNQ																NC	—
1986					PHX	LBH	INDY	MIL	POR	MEA	CLE	TOR	MCH	POC	MDO	SAN	MCH	ROA	LAG	PHX	MIA		
1986	March 86C	Cosworth DFX V8t	(United States) A. J. Foyt	14	17		24	19					9	4			16			22	23	21st	**16**
1986	March 86C	Cosworth DFX V8t	(United States) George Snider	84			26						27									48th	**0**
1986	March 86C	Cosworth DFX V8t	(United States) Sammy Swindell	84										9								29th	**4**
1986	March 86C	Chevrolet V6t	(United States) Mike Nish	44			DNQ															30	**3**
1987					LBH	PHX	INDY	MIL	POR	MEA	CLE	TOR	MCH	POC	ROA	MDO	NAZ	LAG	MIA				
1987	Lola T87/00	Cosworth DFX V8t	(United States) A. J. Foyt	14			19	6					26	7			7		25			23rd	**14**
1987	March 86C	Cosworth DFX V8t	(United States) Stan Fox	41			7															32nd	**6**
1987	March 86C	Cosworth DFX V8t	(United States) Davy Jones **(R)**	41									10				14		13			35th	**3**
1987	March 86C	Cosworth DFX V8t	(United States) Davy Jones **(R)**	44			28															35th	**3**
1987	March 86C	Chevrolet V6t	(United States) George Snider	84			33															50th	**0**
1988					PHX	LBH	INDY	MIL	POR	CLE	TOR	MEA	MCH	POC	MDO	ROA	NAZ	LAG	MIA				
1988	Lola T88/00; Lola T87/00	Cosworth DFX V8t	(United States) A. J. Foyt	14	4	11	26	5	15	11	15	17	Wth	16	22	10	17	24	25			16th	**29**
1988	Lola T88/00; Lola T87/00	Cosworth DFX V8t	(United States) Johnny Rutherford	14									18									43rd	**0**
1988	March 86C	Cosworth DFX V8t	(United States) Rocky Moran	48			16															25th	**9**
1988	March 86C	Chevrolet V6t	(United States) George Snider	84			DNQ															NC	—
1988	March 86C	Chevrolet V6t	(United States) Stan Fox	84			30															48th	**0**
1989					PHX	LBH	INDY	MIL	DET	POR	CLE	MEA	TOR	MCH	POC	MDO	ROA	NAZ	LAG				
1989	Lola T87/00; Lola T89/00	Cosworth DFX V8t	(United States) A. J. Foyt	14	22	25	5	20	26	Wth		23	17	18	21	21	22	14				18th	**10**
1989	Lola T87/00; Lola T89/00	Cosworth DFX V8t	(United States) Rocky Moran	14															28			38th	**0**
1989	March 86C	Chevrolet V6t	(United States) Stan Fox	84			DNQ															NC	—
1990					PHX	LBH	INDY	MIL	DET	POR	CLE	MEA	TOR	MCH	DEN	VAN	MDO	ROA	NAZ	LAG			
1990	Lola T90/00	Chevrolet 265A V8t	(United States) A. J. Foyt	14	22	24	6	9	17	10	7	5	16	6	10	13	15	20				11th	**42**
1990	Lola T90/00	Chevrolet 265A V8t	(Belgium) Didier Theys	14																12		18th	**15**
1991					SFR	LBH	PHX	INDY	MIL	DET	POR	CLE	MEA	TOR	MCH	DEN	VAN	MDO	ROA	NAZ	LAG		
1991	Lola T91/00	Chevrolet 265A V8t	(United States) Al Unser	14			17															40th	**0**
1991	Lola T91/00	Chevrolet 265A V8t	(United States) A. J. Foyt	14				28	16	23	16	20	13		17					16		32nd	**0**
1991	Lola T91/00	Chevrolet 265A V8t	(United States) Mike Groff	14										8		DNS		20	8		15	16th	**22**
1991	Lola T90/00	Chevrolet 265A V8t	(Mexico) Bernard Jourdain	14		20																41st	**0**
1991	Lola T90/00	Chevrolet 265A V8t	(Mexico) Bernard Jourdain	48				18														41st	**0**
1992					SFR	PHX	LBH	INDY	DET	POR	MIL	NHA	TOR	MCH	CLE	ROA	VAN	MDO	NAZ	LAG			
1992	Lola T91/00; Lola T92/00	Chevrolet 265A V8t	(Switzerland) Gregor Foitek **(R)**	14	21		18															47th	**0**
1992	Lola T91/00; Lola T92/00	Chevrolet 265A V8t	(United States) George Snider	14		22																53rd	**0**
1992	Lola T91/00; Lola T92/00	Chevrolet 265A V8t	(United States) A. J. Foyt	14		DNQ		9														26th	**4**
1992	Lola T91/00; Lola T92/00	Chevrolet 265A V8t	(United States) Brian Bonner **(R)**	14					10													28th	**3**
1992	Lola T91/00; Lola T92/00	Chevrolet 265A V8t	(United States) Ross Cheever **(R)**	14						11	20				25	25	DNQ					32nd	**2**
1992	Lola T91/00; Lola T92/00	Chevrolet 265A V8t	(United States) Pancho Carter	14								11		17								31st	**2**
1992	Lola T91/00; Lola T92/00	Chevrolet 265A V8t	(Switzerland) Jon Beekhuis	14									18									48th	**0**
1992	Lola T91/00; Lola T92/00	Chevrolet 265A V8t	(United States) Mike Groff	14														15	16	8		25th	**5**
1992	Lola T91/00; Lola T92/00	Chevrolet 265A V8t	(United States) Jeff Andretti	48				18														49th	**0**
1993					SFR	PHX	LBH	INDY	MIL	DET	POR	CLE	TOR	MCH	NHA	ROA	VAN	MDO	NAZ	LAG			
1993	Lola T92/00; Lola T93/00	Ford XB V8t	(United States) A. J. Foyt	14				DNQ														NC	—
1993	Lola T92/00; Lola T93/00	Ford XB V8t	(United States) Robby Gordon	14	3	18	DSQ		10	8	8	6	6	15	5	20	23	2	4	10		10th	**84**
1993	Lola T92/00; Lola T93/00	Ford XB V8t	(United States) Robby Gordon	41				27														10th	**84**
1993	Lola T92/00; Lola T93/00	Ford XB V8t	(United States) John Andretti	84				10														29th	**3**
1994					SFR	PHX	LBH	INDY	MIL	DET	POR	CLE	TOR	MCH	MDO	NHA	VAN	ROA	NAZ	LAG			
1994	Lola T92/00; Lola T93/00	Ford XB V8t	(United States) Davy Jones	14	19	12	14															31st	**1**
1994	Lola T94/00	Ford XB V8t	(United States) Bryan Herta **(R)**	14				9	10	9	28	13	Wth									23rd	**11**
1994	Lola T94/00	Ford XB V8t	(United States) Eddie Cheever	14										21	17	21	17	27	24	25		27th	**5**
1994	Lola T94/00	Ford XB V8t	(United States) John Andretti	33				10														28th	**3**
1995					MIA	SFR	PHX	LBH	NAZ	INDY	MIL	DET	POR	ROA	TOR	CLE	MCH	MDO	NHA	VAN	LAG		
1995	Lola T95/00	Ford XB V8t	(United States) Eddie Cheever	14	14	7	14	4	5	31	26	25	25	17	11	22	19	10	17			18th	**33**
1995	Lola T95/00	Ford XB V8t	(United States) Brian Till	14																26		45th	**0**
1995	Lola T95/00	Ford XB V8t	(Sweden) Fredrik Ekblom **(R)**	14																	19	42nd	**0**
1995	Lola T95/00	Ford XB V8t	(United States) Scott Sharp	41						26												44th	**0**

=== Complete IRL IndyCar Series results ===
(key) (Results in bold indicate pole position; results in italics indicate fastest lap)

Year	Chassis	Engine	Drivers	No.	1	2	3	4	5	6	7	8	9	10	11	12	13	14	15	16	17	18	19	Pts Pos	Pts
1996					WDW	PHX	INDY																		
1996	Lola T94/00; Lola T95/00	Ford XB V8t	(United States) Mike Groff	11	6																			6th	**228**
1996	Lola T94/00; Lola T95/00	Ford XB V8t	(United States) Mike Groff	41		3																		6th	**228**
1996	Lola T94/00; Lola T95/00	Ford XB V8t	(Brazil) Marco Greco	41			26																	36th	**9**
1996	Lola T94/00; Lola T95/00	Ford XB V8t	(United States) Scott Sharp	41	11																			1st	**246**
1996	Lola T94/00; Lola T95/00	Ford XB V8t	(United States) Scott Sharp	11		2	10																	1st	**246**
1996	Lola T94/00; Lola T95/00	Ford XB V8t	(United States) Davey Hamilton	14	12	17	12																	9th	'192
1996–97					NHA	LVS	WDW	PHX	INDY	TXS	PPIR	CLT	NHA	LVS											
1996–97	Lola T95/00 (NHA1 & LSV 1 only); Dallara IR7; G-Force GF01	Ford XB V8t (NHA1 & LSV 1 only Oldsmobile Aurora V8	(United States) Davey Hamilton	14	5	11	7	3	6	3	3	16	17	7										2nd	**272**
1996–97	Lola T95/00 (NHA1 & LSV 1 only); Dallara IR7; G-Force GF01	Ford XB V8t (NHA1 & LSV 1 only Oldsmobile Aurora V8	(United States) Scott Sharp	1	1	16	4	16	Wth		**22**													22nd	**119**
1996–97	Lola T95/00 (NHA1 & LSV 1 only); Dallara IR7; G-Force GF01	Ford XB V8t (NHA1 & LSV 1 only Oldsmobile Aurora V8	(United States) Johnny O'Connell	1					Wth															40th	**23**
1996–97	Lola T95/00 (NHA1 & LSV 1 only); Dallara IR7; G-Force GF01	Ford XB V8t (NHA1 & LSV 1 only Oldsmobile Aurora V8	(United States) Paul Durant	1					21															40th	**23**
1996–97	Lola T95/00 (NHA1 & LSV 1 only); Dallara IR7; G-Force GF01	Ford XB V8t (NHA1 & LSV 1 only Oldsmobile Aurora V8	(United States) Billy Boat **(R)**	1						2^{1}		2	8	**23**										18th	**151**
1996–97	Lola T95/00 (NHA1 & LSV 1 only); Dallara IR7; G-Force GF01	Ford XB V8t (NHA1 & LSV 1 only Oldsmobile Aurora V8	(United States) Billy Boat **(R)**	11					7															18th	**151**
1998					WDW	PHX	INDY	TXS	NHA	DOV	CLT	PPIR	ATL	TXS	LSV										
1998	Dallara IR8	Oldsmobile Aurora V8	(United States) Billy Boat	11	21	3	**23**	1	**21**			**9**	**12**	**14**	**26**									13th	**194**
1998	Dallara IR8	Oldsmobile Aurora V8	(United States) Greg Ray	11						15	17													21st	**128**
1998	Dallara IR8	Oldsmobile Aurora V8	(Sweden) Kenny Bräck	14	13	14	6	3	18	10	1	1	1	5	10									1st	**332**
1999					WDW	PHX	CLT	INDY	TXS	PPIR	ATL	DOV	PPIR	LSV	TXS										
1999	Dallara IR9	Oldsmobile Aurora V8	(United States) Billy Boat	11	9	4	C^{2}	3	24	24	**10**	4	13	22	9									12th	**204**
1999	Dallara IR9	Oldsmobile Aurora V8	(Sweden) Kenny Bräck	14	22	24	C^{2}	1	13	7	3	3	10	2	16									2nd	**256**
1999	Dallara IR9	Oldsmobile Aurora V8	(Brazil) Marco Greco	41				DNQ																36th	**18**
1999	Dallara IR9	Oldsmobile Aurora V8	(United States) Robbie Buhl	84				6																22nd	**114**
2000					WDW	PHX	LSV	INDY	TXS	PPIR	ATL	KTY	TXS												
2000	G-Force GF05	Oldsmobile Aurora V8	(Chile) Eliseo Salazar	11	5	4	18	3	17	6	10	25	5											4th	**210**
2000	G-Force GF05	Oldsmobile Aurora V8	(United States) Jeff Ward	14	7	11	21	4	19	15	19	6	8											11th	**176**
2000	G-Force GF05	Oldsmobile Aurora V8	(Colombia) Roberto Guerrero	41				Wth																44th	**7**
2000	G-Force GF05	Oldsmobile Aurora V8	(United States) Billy Boat	41				15																10th	**181**
2001					PHX	HMS	ATL	INDY	TXS	PPIR	RIR	KAN	NSH	KTY	GAT	CHI	TXS								
2001	Dallara IR-01	Oldsmobile Aurora V8	(Chile) Eliseo Salazar	14	2	3	5	7	7	14	12	7	11	15	17	18	4							5th	**308**
2001	Dallara IR-01	Oldsmobile Aurora V8	(United States) Donnie Beechler	84				25																15th	**204**
2001	Dallara IR-01	Oldsmobile Aurora V8	(United States) Donnie Beechler	11					6	16	7	3	10	5	14	5								15th	**204**
2001	Dallara IR-01	Oldsmobile Aurora V8	(United States) Greg Ray	11													8							18th	**193**
2001	Dallara IR-01	Oldsmobile Aurora V8	(United States) Robby Gordon	41				21																45th	**9**
2002					HMS	PHX	FON	NAZ	INDY	TXS	PPIR	RIR	KAN	NSH	MCH	KTY	GAT	CHI	TXS						
2002	Dallara IR-02	Chevrolet Indy V8	(Chile) Eliseo Salazar	11	5	4	15							19	19	14	14	18	16					20th	**157**
2002	Dallara IR-02	Chevrolet Indy V8	(United States) Richie Hearn	11				14																15th	**204**
2002	Dallara IR-02	Chevrolet Indy V8	(United States) Greg Ray	11					33	12	18	12	19											23rd	**128**
2002	Dallara IR-02	Chevrolet Indy V8	(United States) Greg Ray	41										20	17	25	19							23rd	**128**
2002	Dallara IR-02	Chevrolet Indy V8	(United States) Donnie Beechler	41					DNQ															–	**0**
2002	Dallara IR-02	Chevrolet Indy V8	(United States) Donnie Beechler	14	Wth																			–	**0**
2002	Dallara IR-02	Chevrolet Indy V8	(Brazil) Airton Daré	14	10	12	13	11	13	3	9	6	1	17	23	23	11	16	12					9th	**304**
2003					HMS	PHX	MOT	INDY	TXS	PPIR	RIR	KAN	NSH	MCH	GAT	KTY	NAZ	CHI	FON	TXS					
2003	Dallara IR-03; G-Force GF09	Toyota Indy V8	(United States) A. J. Foyt IV **(R)**	14	17	18	18	18	21	22	21	15	17	14	17	17	11	17	17	22				21st	**198**
2003	Dallara IR-03; G-Force GF09	Toyota Indy V8	(Japan) Shigeaki Hattori	5	18	10	20	30																26th	**43**
2003	Dallara IR-03	Toyota Indy V8	(United States) Jaques Lazier	5					19	20	16	10												23rd	**120**
2003	Dallara IR-03	Toyota Indy V8	(Brazil) Airton Daré	5					Wth															34th	**6**
2003	G-Force GF09	Toyota Indy V8	(Brazil) Airton Daré	41				24																34th	**6**
2004					HMS	PHX	MOT	INDY	TXS	RIR	KAN	NSH	MIL	MCH	KTY	PPIR	NAZ	CHI	FON	TXS					
2004	Dallara IR-04	Toyota Indy V8	(United States) A. J. Foyt IV	14	15	14	15	33	22	11	13	16	16	15	18	21	15	16	19	10				18th	**232**
2004	G-Force GF09B	Toyota Indy V8	(United States) Larry Foyt **(R)**	41				32																37th	**10**
2005					HMS	PHX	STP	MOT	INDY	TXS	RIR	KAN	NSH	MIL	MCH	KTY	PPIR	SNM	CHI	WGL	FON				
2005	Dallara IR-05	Toyota Indy V8	(United States) A. J. Foyt IV	14	9	14		14	28	18	14	16	12	21	12									20th	**231**
2005	G-Force GF09C	Toyota Indy V8	(United States) A. J. Foyt IV	14			21																	20th	**231**
2005	Dallara IR-05	Chevrolet Indy V8	(United States) A. J. Foyt IV	14												9	21		11		21			20th	**231**
2005	Dallara IR-05	Chevrolet Indy V8	(United States) Jeff Bucknum **(R)**	14														10		11				25th	**63**
2005	Dallara IR-05	Toyota Indy V8	(United States) Larry Foyt	41					33															38th	**10**
2005	G-Force GF09C	Toyota Indy V8	(United States) Scott Mayer **(R)**	48					Wth															—	**0**
2005	G-Force GF09C	Toyota Indy V8	(Brazil) Felipe Giaffone	48					15															31st	**15**
2006					HMS	STP	MOT	INDY	WGL	TXS	RIR	KAN	NSH	MIL	MCH	KTY	SNM	CHI							
2006	Dallara IR-05	Honda HI6R V8	(Brazil) Felipe Giaffone	14	8	9	15	21	5	16	17	19												17th	**142**
2006	Dallara IR-05	Honda HI6R V8	(United States) Jeff Bucknum	14									18	13	14	13	18	17						20th	**97**
2006	Dallara IR-05	Honda HI6R V8	(United States) Larry Foyt	41				30																38th	**10**
2007					HMS	STP	MOT	KAN	INDY	MIL	TXS	IOW	RIR	WGL	NSH	MDO	MCH	KTY	SNM	DET	CHI				
2007	Dallara IR-05	Honda HI7R V8	(United Kingdom) Darren Manning	14	13	12	12	11	20	11	13	5	14	9	9	6	15	13	12	4	21			13th	**332**
2007	Dallara IR-05	Honda HI7R V8	(United States) Al Unser Jr.	50					26															32nd	**10**
2008					HMS	STP	MOT	LBH	KAN	INDY	MIL	TXS	IOW	RIR	WGL	NSH	MDO	EDM	KTY	SNM	DET	CHI	SRF^{3}		
2008	Dallara IR-05	Honda HI8R V8	(United Kingdom) Darren Manning	14	13	13	8		24	9	13	28	21	12	2	9	8	10	19	22	12	7		14th	**323**
2008	Dallara IR-05	Honda HI8R V8	(Brazil) Vítor Meira	14																			14	13th	**324**
2008	Dallara IR-05	Honda HI8R V8	(United States) Jeff Simmons	41						28														39th	**10**
2008	Dallara IR-05	Honda HI8R V8	(France) Franck Perera **(R)**	41																		15		29th	**71**
2009					STP	LBH	KAN	INDY	MIL	TXS	IOW	RIR	WGL	TOR	EDM	KTY	MDO	SNM	CHI	MOT	HMS				
2009	Dallara IR-05	Honda HI9R V8	(Brazil) Vítor Meira	14	9	14	22	21																28th	**62**
2009	Dallara IR-05	Honda HI9R V8	(Canada) Paul Tracy	14					17															23rd	**113**
2009	Dallara IR-05	Honda HI9R V8	(United States) Ryan Hunter-Reay	14							19	15	21	7	17	14	4	19	15	21	13			15th	**298**
2009	Dallara IR-05	Honda HI9R V8	(United States) A. J. Foyt IV	14						20														33rd	**26**
2009	Dallara IR-05	Honda HI9R V8	(United States) A. J. Foyt IV	41				16																33rd	**26**
2010					SAO	STP	ALA	LBH	KAN	INDY	TXS	IOW	WGL	TOR	EDM	MDO	SNM	CHI	KTY	MOT	HMS				
2010	Dallara IR-05	Honda HI10R V8	(Brazil) Vítor Meira	14	3	15	18	11	10	27	10	7	19	11	16	15	15	9	23	17	6			12th	**310**
2010	Dallara IR-05	Honda HI10R V8	(United States) A. J. Foyt IV	41						Wth														—	**0**
2010	Dallara IR-05	Honda HI10R V8	(United States) Jaques Lazier	41						DNQ														—	**0**
2011					STP	ALA	LBH	SAO	INDY	TXS		MIL	IOW	TOR	EDM	MDO	NHA	SNM	BAL	MOT	KTY	LSV			
2011	Dallara IR-05	Honda HI11R V8	(Brazil) Vítor Meira	14	8	12	9	17	15	8	11	24	18	5	12	10	10	22	9	25	16	C^{4}		16th	**287**
2011	Dallara IR-05	Honda HI11R V8	(Brazil) Bruno Junqueira	41					Wth															47th	**4**
2011	Dallara IR-05	Honda HI11R V8	(United States) Ryan Hunter-Reay	41					23															7th	**347**
2012					STP	ALA	LBH	SAO	INDY	DET	TEX	MIL	IOW	TOR	EDM	MDO	SNM	BAL	FON						
2012	Dallara DW12	Honda HI12TT V6t	(United Kingdom) Mike Conway	14	20	7	22	19	29	9	16	16	20	3	11	21	14	16						21st	**233**
2012	Dallara DW12	Honda HI12TT V6t	(New Zealand) Wade Cunningham **(R)**	14															14					28th	**29**
2012	Dallara DW12	Honda HI12TT V6t	(New Zealand) Wade Cunningham **(R)**	41					31															28th	**29**
2013					STP	ALA	LBH	SAO	INDY	DET		TXS	MIL	IOW	POC	TOR		MDO	SNM	BAL	HOU		FON		
2013	Dallara DW12	Honda HI13TT V6t	(Japan) Takuma Sato	14	8	14	1*	2*	13	19	23	11	7*	23	22	24	20	22	23	24	**17**	14	17	17th	**322**
2013	Dallara DW12	Honda HI13TT V6t	(United States) Conor Daly **(R)**	41					22															34th	**11**
2014					STP	LBH	ALA	IMS	INDY	DET		TXS	HOU		POC	IOW	TOR		MDO	MIL	SNM	FON			
2014	Dallara DW12	Honda HI14TT V6t	(Japan) Takuma Sato	14	**7**	22	13	9	19	18	**18**	18	22	19	21	22	23	5	18	15	4	6		18th	**350**
2014	Dallara DW12	Honda HI14TT V6t	(United Kingdom) Martin Plowman	41				18	23															34th	**18**
2015					STP	NOL	LBH	ALA	IMS	INDY	DET		TXS	TOR	FON	MIL	IOW	MDO	POC	SNM					
2015	Dallara DW12	Honda HI15TT V6t	(Japan) Takuma Sato	14	13	22	18	17	9	13	11	2	16	10	18	14	19	24	6	8				14th	**323**
2015	Dallara DW12	Honda HI15TT V6t	(United Kingdom) Jack Hawksworth	41	8	24	14	21	23	24	7	7	23	14	10	17	13	8	22	19				17th	**256**
2015	Dallara DW12	Honda HI15TT V6t	(Canada) Alex Tagliani	48						17														37th	**27**
2016					STP	PHX	LBH	ALA	IMS	INDY	DET		ROA	IOW	TOR	MDO	POC	TXS	WGL	SNM					
2016	Dallara DW12	Honda HI16TT V6t	(Japan) Takuma Sato	14	6	15	5	13	18	26	11	10	17	11	5	9	22	20	17	14				17th	**320**
2016	Dallara DW12	Honda HI16TT V6t	(Canada) Alex Tagliani	35					23	17														31st	**35**
2016	Dallara DW12	Honda HI16TT V6t	(United Kingdom) Jack Hawksworth	41	11	19	21	19	20	16	22	19	11	15	21	21	14	17	16	18				20th	**229**
2017					STP	LBH	ALA	PHX	IMS	INDY	DET		TEX	ROA	IOW	TOR	MDO	POC	GAT	WGL	SNM				
2017	Dallara DW12	Chevrolet IndyCar V6t	(United States) Conor Daly	4	15	16	18	14	17	30	22	12	7	15	19	17	10	14	5	11	10			18th	**305**
2017	Dallara DW12	Chevrolet IndyCar V6t	(Colombia) Carlos Muñoz	14	21	7	17	10	15	10	14	11	18	11	20	15	18	10	9	10	15			16th	**328**
2017	Dallara DW12	Chevrolet IndyCar V6t	(United States) Zach Veach **(R)**	40						26														33rd	**23**
2018					STP	PHX	LBH	ALA	IMS	INDY	DET		TXS	ROA	IOW	TOR	MDO	POC	GAT	POR	SNM				
2018	Dallara DW12	Chevrolet IndyCar V6t	(Brazil) Matheus Leist **(R)**	4	24	19	14	12	21	13	15	14	22	15	22	15	19	11	16	14	19			18th	**253**
2018	Dallara DW12	Chevrolet IndyCar V6t	(Brazil) Tony Kanaan	14	11	8	8	18	14	25	14	7	21	14	17	6	18	17	13	11	12			16th	**312**
2018	Dallara DW12	Chevrolet IndyCar V6t	(Australia) James Davison R	33						33														41st	**10**
2019					STP	COA	ALA	LBH	IMS	INDY	DET		TXS	ROA	TOR	IOW	MDO	POC	GAT	POR	LAG				
2019	Dallara DW12	Chevrolet IndyCar V6t	(Brazil) Matheus Leist	4	22	17	20	15	4	15	21	20	22	20	19	16	18	14	17	8	17			19th	**261**
2019	Dallara DW12	Chevrolet IndyCar V6t	(Brazil) Tony Kanaan	14	15	12	18	19	20	9	15	22	16	21	17	10	20	8	3	12	16			15th	**304**
2020					TXS	IMS	ROA		IOW		INDY	GAT		MDO		IMS		STP							
2020	Dallara DW12	Chevrolet IndyCar V6t	(United States) Charlie Kimball	4	11	18	11	10	17	16	18	13	18	21	19	13	23	8						18th	**218**
2020	Dallara DW12	Chevrolet IndyCar V6t	(Brazil) Tony Kanaan	14	10				18	11	19	9	19											24th	**106**
2020	Dallara DW12	Chevrolet IndyCar V6t	(Canada) Dalton Kellett R	14		21	20	20						22	21									26th	**67**
2020	Dallara DW12	Chevrolet IndyCar V6t	(Canada) Dalton Kellett R	41							31					24	25							26th	**67**
2020	Dallara DW12	Chevrolet IndyCar V6t	(France) Sébastien Bourdais	14												21	18	4						28th	**53**
2021					ALA	STP	TXS		IMS	INDY	DET		ROA	MDO	NSH	IMS	GAT	POR	LAG	LBH					
2021	Dallara DW12	Chevrolet IndyCar V6t	(United States) J. R. Hildebrand	1						15														33rd	**30**
2021	Dallara DW12	Chevrolet IndyCar V6t	(Canada) Dalton Kellett	4	18	23	18	23	20	23	18	23	25	21	23	26	12	26	23	19				23rd	**148**
2021	Dallara DW12	Chevrolet IndyCar V6t	(United States) Charlie Kimball	11					22	DNQ										18				36th	**20**
2021	Dallara DW12	Chevrolet IndyCar V6t	(France) Sébastien Bourdais	14	5	10	24	19	19	26	11	16	16	11	27	15	5	18	14	8				16th	**258**
2022					STP	TXS	LBH	ALA	IMS	INDY	DET	ROA	MDO	TOR	IOW		IMS	NSH	GAT	POR	LAG				
2022	Dallara DW12	Chevrolet IndyCar V6t	(Canada) Dalton Kellett	4	25	17	26	23	27	27	20	23	22	24	20	22	21	25	18	22	25			25th	**133**
2022	Dallara DW12	Chevrolet IndyCar V6t	(Colombia) Tatiana Calderón **(R)**	11	24		16	26	15		23	25	25											29th	**58***
2022	Dallara DW12	Chevrolet IndyCar V6t	(United States) J. R. Hildebrand	11		14				12														30th	**53**
2022	Dallara DW12	Chevrolet IndyCar V6t	(United States) Kyle Kirkwood **(R)**	14	18	25	10	22	26	17	24	20	26	22	15	25	23	19	17	13	21			24th	**183**
2023					STP	TXS	LBH	ALA	IMS	INDY	DET	ROA	MDO	TOR	IOW		NSH	IMS	GAT	POR	LAG				
2023	Dallara DW12	Chevrolet IndyCar V6t	(United States) Santino Ferrucci	14	24	21	11	20	23	3	21	16	24	17	26	22	18	23	13	16	17			19th	**214**
2023	Dallara DW12	Chevrolet IndyCar V6t	(Denmark) Benjamin Pedersen **(R)**	55	27	15	24	22	24	21	20	21	26	27	27	27	23	26	28	22	16			27th	**129**
2024					STP	THE^{1}	LBH	ALA	IMS	INDY	DET	ROA	LAG	MDO	IOW		TOR	GAT	POR	MIL		NSH			
2024	Dallara DW12	Chevrolet IndyCar V6t	(United States) Santino Ferrucci	14	9	DNQ	21	7	27	8	9	15	9	10	6	11	20	12	**8**	4	4	6		9th	**367**
2024	Dallara DW12	Chevrolet IndyCar V6t	(United States) Sting Ray Robb	41	24	DNQ	18	26	22	16	21	17	20	16	15	21	25	9	18	23	18	20		20th	**185**
2025					STP	THE	LBH	ALA	IMS	INDY	DET	GAT	ROA	MDO	IOW		TOR	LAG	POR	MIL	NSH				
2025	Dallara DW12	Chevrolet IndyCar V6t	(United States) David Malukas	4	13	18	17	16	23	2	14	12*	7	17	12	4	9	13	19	8	26			11th	**318**
2025	Dallara DW12	Chevrolet IndyCar V6t	(United States) Santino Ferrucci	14	14	14	11	18	20	5	2	5	3	16	8	15	DNS	22	27	14	8			16th	**293**
2026					STP	PHX	ARL	ALA	LBH	IMS	INDY	DET	GAT	ROA	MOH	NSH	POR	MAR	D.C.	MIL		LAG			
2026	Dallara DW12	Chevrolet IndyCar V6t	(Brazil) Caio Collet **(R)**	4	17	19	12	21	22	19	26	16	22	16	11	25	20	19	9	24	23	20		24th	**203**
2026	Dallara DW12	Chevrolet IndyCar V6t	(United Kingdom) Katherine Legge	11^{5}							33													33rd	**5**
2026	Dallara DW12	Chevrolet IndyCar V6t	(United States) Santino Ferrucci	14	24	11	17	8	18	14	8	23	13	9	19	13	21	10	21	20	12	12		17th	**280**

* Season still in progress

1. Billy Boat was originally scored as the winner of the 1997 True Value 500 until it was discovered afterward that a scoring error had mistakenly put several drivers multiple laps down during the race. Arie Luyendyk was ultimately declared the winner.
2. The 1999 VisionAire 500K at Charlotte was cancelled after 79 laps due to spectator fatalities.
3. Non-points-paying, exhibition race.
4. The final race at Las Vegas was canceled due to Dan Wheldon's death.
5. In conjunction with HMD Motorsports

=== IndyCar wins ===
IndyCar wins
#	Season	Date	Sanction	Track / Race	No.	Winning driver	Chassis	Engine	Tire	Grid	Laps Led
1	1967	May 30	USAC	Indianapolis 500 **(O)**	14	(United States) A. J. Foyt	Coyote 67	Ford Indy DOHC V8	Goodyear	4	27
2	1967	August 19	USAC	Springfield **(DO)**	14	(United States) A. J. Foyt (2)	Meskowski 63 D	Offenhauser L4 252 ci	Goodyear	2	100
3	1967	September 4	USAC	DuQuoin **(DO)**	14	(United States) A. J. Foyt (3)	Meskowski 63 D	Offenhauser L4 252 ci	Goodyear	3	56
4	1967	September 24	USAC	Trenton International Speedway **(O)**	14	(United States) A. J. Foyt (4)	Coyote 66	Ford Indy DOHC V8	Goodyear	2	38
5	1967	October 1	USAC	Sacramento **(DO)**	14	(United States) A. J. Foyt (5)	Meskowski 63 D	Offenhauser L4 252 ci	Goodyear	3	99
6	1968	July 7	USAC	Continental Divide Raceways **(R)**	1	(United States) A. J. Foyt (6)	Coyote 67	Ford Indy DOHC V8	Goodyear	4	34
7	1968	September 7	USAC	Indiana State Fairgrounds **(DO)**	1	(United States) A. J. Foyt (7)	Meskowski 63 D	Offenhauser L4 252 ci	Goodyear	7	88
8	1968	September 29	USAC	Sacramento **(DO)**	1	(United States) A. J. Foyt (8)	Meskowski 63 D	Offenhauser L4 252 ci	Goodyear	2	100
9	1968	November 3	USAC	Hanford Motor Speedway **(O)**	1	(United States) A. J. Foyt (9)	Coyote 68	Ford Indy DOHC V8t	Goodyear	7	36
10	1969	September 6	USAC	Indiana State Fairgrounds **(DO)**	6	(United States) A. J. Foyt (10)	Meskowski 69 D	Ford Indy DOHC V8	Goodyear	4	46
11	1970	September 6	USAC	Ontario Motor Speedway **(O)**	14	(United States) Jim McElreath	Coyote 70	Ford Indy DOHC V8t 159 ci	Goodyear	18	5
12	1971	October 23	USAC	Phoenix International Raceway **(O)**	9	(United States) A. J. Foyt (11)	Coyote 71	Ford Indy DOHC V8t 159 ci	Goodyear	3	107
13	1973	April 15	USAC	Trenton – Heat 1 **(O)**	14	(United States) A. J. Foyt (12)	Coyote 73	Foyt V8t 159 ci	Goodyear	2	66
14	1973	July 1	USAC	Pocono 500 **(O)**	14	(United States) A. J. Foyt (13)	Coyote 73	Foyt V8t 159 ci	Goodyear	14	11
15	1974	March 3	USAC	Ontario 500 Qualification Heat 2 **(O)**	14	(United States) A. J. Foyt (14)	Coyote 73	Foyt V8t 159 ci	Goodyear	**Pole**	40
16	1974	September 22	USAC	Trenton – Heat 1 **(O)**	14	(United States) A. J. Foyt (15)	Coyote 73	Foyt V8t 159 ci	Goodyear	**Pole**	51
17	1975	March 2	USAC	Ontario 500 Qualification Heat 1 **(O)**	14	(United States) A. J. Foyt (16)	Coyote 73	Foyt V8t 159 ci	Goodyear	**Pole**	40
18	1975	March 9	USAC	Ontario 500 **(O)**	14	(United States) A. J. Foyt (17)	Coyote 73	Foyt V8t 159 ci	Goodyear	**Pole**	187
19	1975	April 6	USAC	Trenton Speedway **(O)**	14	(United States) A. J. Foyt (18)	Coyote 73	Foyt V8t 159 ci	Goodyear	10	100
20	1975	June 8	USAC	Milwaukee Mile **(O)**	14	(United States) A. J. Foyt (19)	Coyote 75	Foyt V8t 159 ci	Goodyear	**Pole**	36
21	1975	June 29	USAC	Pocono 500 **(O)**	14	(United States) A. J. Foyt (20)	Coyote 75	Foyt V8t 159 ci	Goodyear	2	115
22	1975	July 20	USAC	Michigan International Speedway **(O)**	14	(United States) A. J. Foyt (21)	Coyote 75	Foyt V8t 159 ci	Goodyear	**Pole**	52
23	1975	November 9	USAC	Phoenix International Raceway **(O)**	14	(United States) A. J. Foyt (22)	Coyote 75	Foyt V8t 159 ci	Goodyear	5	21
24	1976	August 1	USAC	Texas World Speedway **(O)**	14	(United States) A. J. Foyt (23)	Coyote 75	Foyt V8t 159 ci	Goodyear	**Pole**	74
25	1976	September 18	USAC	Michigan International Speedway **(O)**	14	(United States) A. J. Foyt (24)	Coyote 75	Foyt V8t 159 ci	Goodyear	**Pole**	24
26	1977	March 6	USAC	Ontario **(O)**	14	(United States) A. J. Foyt (25)	Coyote 75	Foyt V8t 159 ci	Goodyear	6	48
27	1977	May 29	USAC	Indianapolis 500 **(O)**	14	(United States) A. J. Foyt (26)	Coyote 75	Foyt V8t 159 ci	Goodyear	4	46
28	1977	July 3	USAC	Mosport International Raceway **(R)**	14	(United States) A. J. Foyt (27)	Coyote 74	Foyt V8t 159 ci	Goodyear	7	37
29	1978	August 6	USAC	Texas World Speedway **(O)**	14	(United States) A. J. Foyt (28)	Coyote 75	Foyt V8t 159 ci	Goodyear	2	50
30	1978	October 1	USAC	Silverstone Circuit **(R)**	14	(United States) A. J. Foyt (29)	Coyote 75	Foyt V8t 159 ci	Goodyear	10	7
31	1979	March 25	USAC	Ontario **(O)**	14	(United States) A. J. Foyt (30)	Parnelli VPJ-6C	Cosworth DFX V8t	Goodyear	**Pole**	59
32	1979	April 8	USAC	Texas World Speedway **(O)**	14	(United States) A. J. Foyt (31)	Coyote 75	Foyt V8t 159 ci	Goodyear	**Pole**	83
33	1979	June 10	USAC	Milwaukee Mile **(O)**	14	(United States) A. J. Foyt (32)	Parnelli VPJ-6C	Cosworth DFX V8t	Goodyear	**Pole**	123
34	1979	June 24	USAC	Pocono 500 **(O)**	14	(United States) A. J. Foyt (33)	Parnelli VPJ-6C	Cosworth DFX V8t	Goodyear	**Pole**	128
35	1979	July 29	USAC	Texas World Speedway **(O)**	14	(United States) A. J. Foyt (34)	Parnelli VPJ-6C	Cosworth DFX V8t	Goodyear	**Pole**	68
36	1981	June 21	USAC	Pocono 500 **(O)**	14	(United States) A. J. Foyt (35)	March 81C	Cosworth DFX V8t	Goodyear	**Pole**	35
37	1996–97	August 18	IRL	New Hampshire Motor Speedway **(O)**	1	(United States) Scott Sharp	Lola T95/00	Ford XB V8t	Goodyear	12	18
38	1998	June 6	IRL	Texas Motor Speedway **(O)**	11	(United States) Billy Boat	Dallara IR8	Oldsmobile Aurora V8	Goodyear	2	108
39	1998	July 25	IRL	Charlotte Motor Speedway **(O)**	14	(Sweden) Kenny Bräck	Dallara IR8	Oldsmobile Aurora V8	Goodyear	3	76
40	1998	August 16	IRL	Pikes Peak International Raceway **(O)**	14	(Sweden) Kenny Bräck (2)	Dallara IR8	Oldsmobile Aurora V8	Goodyear	5	28
41	1998	August 29	IRL	Atlanta Motor Speedway **(O)**	14	(Sweden) Kenny Bräck (3)	Dallara IR8	Oldsmobile Aurora V8	Goodyear	6	17
42	1999	May 28	IRL	Indianapolis 500 **(O)**	14	(Sweden) Kenny Bräck (4)	Dallara IR9	Oldsmobile Aurora V8	Goodyear	8	66
43	2002	July 7	IRL	Kansas Speedway **(O)**	14	(Brazil) Airton Daré	Dallara IR-02	Chevrolet Indy V8	Firestone	6	8
44	2013	April 21	IndyCar	Grand Prix of Long Beach **(S)**	14	(Japan) Takuma Sato	Dallara DW12	Honda HI13TT V6t	Firestone	4	50

=== Complete NASCAR Winston Cup Series results ===
(key)

==== Primary Car results ====
Year	Driver	No.	Make	1	2	3	4	5	6	7	8	9	10	11	12	13	14	15	16	17	18	19	20	21	22	23	24	25	26	27	28	29	30	31	32	33	34	35	36	Owners	Pts
1973	A. J. Foyt	50	Chevy	RSD	DAY; 4	RCH	CAR	BRI	ATL; 27	NWS	DAR	MAR	TAL	NSV	CLT	DOV	TWS	RSD	MCH	DAY; 37	BRI	ATL	TAL	NSV	DAR	RCH	DOV	NWS	MAR	CLT	CAR										
1974	A. J. Foyt	50	Chevy	RSD	DAY; 5	RCH	CAR	BRI	ATL	DAR	NWS	MAR	TAL	NSV	DOV	CLT	RSD	MCH	DAY; 29	BRI	NSV	ATL	POC	TAL	MCH	DAR	RCH	DOV	NWS	MAR	CLT	CAR	ONT								
1977	A. J. Foyt	51	Chevy	RSD	DAY; 6	RCH	CAR	ATL; 34	NWS	DAR	BRI	MAR	**TAL**; 38	NSV	DOV	CLT	RSD	MCH	DAY; 5	NSV	POC									CLT; 7	CAR	ATL	ONT; 11								
1977	Johnny Rutherford	51	Chevy																			TAL; 21	MCH	BRI	DAR	RCH	DOV	MAR	NWS												
1978	A. J. Foyt	51	Buick	RSD	DAY; 32	RCH	CAR	ATL	BRI	DAR	NWS	MAR	TAL; 3	DOV																											
1978	Ron Hutcherson	51	Buick												CLT; 39	NSV	RSD	MCH	DAY	NSV	POC	TAL	MCH	BRI	DAR	RCH	DOV	MAR	NWS	CLT	CAR	ATL	ONT								
1979	A. J. Foyt	51	Olds	RSD	DAY; 3	CAR	RCH	ATL	NWS	BRI	DAR	MAR	TAL	NSV	DOV	CLT	TWS	RSD	MCH	DAY; 10	NSV	POC	TAL	MCH	BRI	DAR	RCH	DOV	MAR	CLT	NWS	CAR	ATL	ONT							
1980	A. J. Foyt	51	Olds	RSD	DAY; 31	RCH	CAR																																		
1980	Don Whittington	51	Olds					ATL; 38	BRI	DAR	NWS	MAR	TAL	NSV	DOV	CLT	TWS	RSD	MCH	DAY	NSV	POC	TAL	MCH	BRI	DAR	RCH	DOV	NWS	MAR	CLT	CAR	ATL	ONT							
1981	A. J. Foyt	51	Olds	RSD	DAY; 35	RCH	CAR	ATL; 7	BRI	NWS	DAR	MAR	TAL	NSV	DOV	CLT	TWS	RSD	MCH	DAY; 32	NSV	POC	TAL	MCH	BRI	DAR	RCH	DOV	MAR	NWS	CLT	CAR	ATL	RSD							
1982	A. J. Foyt	51	Olds	DAY; 21	RCH	BRI	ATL; 39	CAR	DAR	NWS	MAR	TAL	NSV	DOV	CLT	POC	RSD	MCH	DAY	NSV	POC	TAL	MCH	BRI	DAR	RCH	DOV	NWS	CLT	MAR	CAR	ATL	RSD								
1983	A. J. Foyt	14	Chevy	DAY; 11	RCH	CAR	ATL; 38	DAR	NWS	MAR	TAL; 34	NSV	DOV	BRI	CLT	RSD	POC	MCH	DAY; Wth	NSV	POC	TAL	MCH	BRI	DAR	RCH	DOV	MAR	NWS	CLT	CAR	ATL	RSD								
1984	A. J. Foyt	14	Olds	DAY; 39	RCH	CAR	ATL; 35	BRI	NWS	DAR	MAR	TAL	NSV	DOV	CLT	RSD	POC	MCH	DAY	NSV	POC	TAL; 36	MCH	BRI	DAR	RCH	DOV	MAR	CLT	NWS	CAR	ATL; 41	RSD								
1985	A. J. Foyt	14	Olds	DAY; 30	RCH	CAR	ATL; 36	BRI	DAR	NWS	MAR	TAL	DOV	CLT	RSD	POC	MCH	DAY; 30	POC	TAL; 5	MCH	BRI	DAR; 25	RCH	DOV	MAR	NWS	CLT; 32	CAR	ATL; 38	RSD										
1986	A. J. Foyt	14	Olds	DAY; 29	RCH	CAR	ATL; 17	BRI	DAR	NWS	MAR	TAL	DOV	CLT	RSD	POC	MCH	DAY; 42	POC	TAL; 30	GLN	MCH	BRI	DAR	RCH	DOV	MAR	NWS	CLT; 37	CAR	ATL	RSD									
1987	A. J. Foyt	14	Olds	DAY	CAR	RCH	ATL; 20	DAR	NWS	BRI	MAR	TAL	CLT	DOV	POC	RSD	MCH	DAY; 38	POC	TAL; 35	GLN	MCH	BRI	DAR	RCH	DOV	MAR	NWS	CLT; 21	CAR	RSD	ATL; 37									
1988	A. J. Foyt	14	Olds	DAY; 33	RCH	CAR	ATL; 34	DAR	BRI	NWS	MAR	TAL; 28	CLT	DOV	RSD	POC	MCH	DAY; 37	POC	TAL; 12	GLN	MCH	BRI	DAR	RCH	DOV	MAR	CLT; 36	NWS	CAR	PHO	ATL; 31									
1989	A. J. Foyt	14	Olds	DAY; 38	CAR	ATL; 28	RCH	DAR	BRI	NWS	MAR	TAL; 16						DAY; 35	POC	TAL; 18	GLN; 37							CLT; Wth^{†}	NWS	CAR	PHO	ATL; 36									
1989	Tracy Leslie	14	Olds										CLT; 24	DOV	SON	POC	MCH					MCH; 20	BRI	DAR	RCH	DOV	MAR														
1990	A. J. Foyt	14	Olds	DAY; 36	RCH	CAR	ATL; DNQ	DAR	BRI	NWS	MAR	TAL	CLT	DOV	SON	POC	MCH	DAY; 38	POC	TAL; 27	GLN	MCH	BRI	DAR	RCH	DOV	MAR	NWS	CLT	CAR	PHO	ATL									
1991	Mike Chase	14	Olds	DAY	RCH	CAR	ATL	DAR	BRI	NWS	MAR	TAL	CLT	DOV	SON	POC	MCH	DAY; 33	POC	TAL; 25	GLN	MCH; 29	BRI	DAR	RCH	DOV	MAR	NWS	CLT	CAR											
1991	Mike Chase	14	Chevy																												PHO; 26	ATL									
1994	A. J. Foyt	50	Ford	DAY	CAR	RCH	ATL	DAR	BRI	NWS	MAR	TAL	SON	CLT	DOV	POC	MCH	DAY	NHA	POC	TAL	IND; 30																			
1994	Brian Bonner	50	Ford																				GLN; DNQ	MCH	BRI	DAR	RCH	DOV	MAR	NWS	CLT	CAR	PHO	ATL; DNQ							
1995	A. J. Foyt	50	Ford	DAY	CAR	RCH	ATL	DAR	BRI	NWS	MAR	TAL	SON	CLT	DOV	POC	MCH	DAY	NHA	POC	TAL	IND; DNQ	GLN	MCH	BRI	DAR	RCH	DOV	MAR	NWS	CLT	CAR	PHO; DNQ	ATL							
2000	Mike Bliss	14	Pontiac	DAY; 33	CAR; DNQ	LVS; DNQ	ATL; DNQ																																	35th	2389
2000	Dick Trickle	14	Pontiac					DAR; 31	BRI; 27																															35th	2389
2000	Rick Mast	14	Pontiac							TEX; 20	MAR; DNQ	TAL; DNQ	CAL; 39	RCH; DNQ	CLT; 39	DOV; 43	MCH; 30	POC; 35	SON; DNQ	DAY; 31	NHA; 12	POC; 8	IND; 38	GLN; 19	MCH; 29	BRI; 29	DAR; 12	RCH; 28	NHA; 32	DOV; 10	MAR; 26	CLT; 17	TAL; 31	CAR; 13	PHO; 39	HOM; 29	ATL; 35			35th	2389
2001	Ron Hornaday Jr.	14	Pontiac	DAY; 17	CAR; 25	LVS; 9	ATL; 39	DAR; 42	BRI; 21	TEX; 40	MAR; 27	TAL; 22	CAL; 34	RCH; 31	CLT; 36	DOV; 35	MCH; 32	POC; 35	SON; 18	DAY; DNQ	CHI; 40	NHA; 34	POC; 30	IND; 34	GLN; 17	MCH; 30	BRI; 29	DAR; 37	RCH; 41	DOV; 34	KAN; DNQ	CLT; 38	MAR; 18		PHO; 30	CAR; 31	HOM; DNQ	ATL; DNQ	NHA; 32	39th	2399
2001	Ron Hornaday Jr.	14	Chevy																															TAL; 38						39th	2399
2002	Stacy Compton	14	Pontiac	DAY; 27	CAR; 43	LVS; 39	ATL; 31	DAR; 27	BRI; 38	TEX; 19	MAR; 18	TAL; 27	CAL; 41	RCH; 26	CLT; 37	DOV; 24	POC; 28	MCH; 35	SON; DNQ	DAY; 18	CHI; 35	NHA; 30																		37th	2779
2002	Mike Wallace	14	Pontiac																				POC; 39	IND; 43		MCH; 40	BRI; 10	DAR; 32	RCH; 12	NHA; 31	DOV; 28	KAN; 19	TAL; 35	CLT; 17	MAR; 27	ATL; 31	CAR; 43	PHO; 28	HOM; 11	37th	2779
2002	P. J. Jones	14	Pontiac																						GLN; 4															37th	2779
2003	Larry Foyt	14	Dodge	DAY; DNQ	CAR; 36	LVS; 35	ATL; 43	DAR; 32	BRI; DNQ	TEX; 30	TAL; DNQ	MAR	CAL; 38	RCH; 33	CLT; 34	DOV; 28	POC; 41	MCH; DNQ		DAY; 34	CHI; 41	NHA	POC	IND; 32	GLN	MCH	BRI	DAR	RCH	NHA	DOV	TAL; 43	KAN; DNQ			ATL; DNQ	PHO; 28	CAR; 28	HOM; 16	42nd	1309
2003	P. J. Jones	14	Dodge																SON; DNQ																					42nd	1309
2003	Mark Green	14	Dodge																															CLT; DNQ	MAR; DNQ					42nd	1309
2004	Larry Foyt	14	Dodge	DAY; 28	CAR; 32	LVS	ATL	DAR	BRI	TEX; 30	MAR	TAL; DNQ	CAL	RCH	CLT	DOV	POC	MCH	SON	DAY	CHI	NHA	POC	IND	GLN	MCH	BRI	CAL	RCH	NHA	DOV	TAL	KAN	CLT	MAR	ATL	PHO	DAR	HOM	47th	605
^{†} - Withdrew after getting injured in practice

==== Secondary Car results ====
Year	Driver	No.	Make	1	2	3	4	5	6	7	8	9	10	11	12	13	14	15	16	17	18	19	20	21	22	23	24	25	26	27	28	29	30	31	32	33	34	35	36	Owners	Pts
1978	Ron Hutcherson	53	Buick	RSD	DAY; 4	RCH	CAR	ATL	BRI	DAR	NWS	MAR	TAL; 34	DOV	CLT	NSV	RSD	MCH	DAY	NSV	POC	TAL	MCH	BRI	DAR	RCH	DOV	MAR	NWS	CLT	CAR	ATL	ONT								
2000	Larry Foyt	41	Pontiac	DAY	CAR	LVS	ATL	DAR	BRI	TEX	MAR	TAL	CAL	RCH	CLT	DOV	MCH	POC	SON	DAY	NHA	POC	IND	GLN	MCH	BRI	DAR	RCH	NHA	DOV	MAR	CLT	TAL	CAR	PHO	HOM	ATL; DNQ			N/A	-
2001	Mark Green	41	Pontiac	DAY	CAR	LVS	ATL	DAR	BRI	TEX	MAR	TAL	CAL	RCH	CLT	DOV	MCH	POC	SON	DAY	CHI	NHA	POC	IND	GLN	MCH	BRI	DAR	RCH	DOV	KAN	CLT	MAR	TAL	PHO	CAR	HOM	ATL; DNQ	NHA	72nd	0
2002	P. J. Jones	50	Pontiac	DAY	CAR	LVS	ATL	DAR	BRI	TEX	MAR	TAL	CAL	RCH	CLT	DOV	POC	MCH	SON	DAY	CHI	NHA	POC	IND; DNQ	GLN	MCH	BRI	DAR	RCH	NHA	DOV	KAN	TAL	CLT	MAR	ATL	CAR	PHO	HOM	N/A	-
2003	Larry Foyt	50	Dodge	DAY	CAR	LVS	ATL	DAR	BRI	TEX	TAL	MAR	CAL	RCH	CLT	DOV	POC	MCH	SON	DAY	CHI	NHA; DNQ	POC; 29	IND	GLN; DNQ	MCH; 39	BRI; 39	DAR; DNQ	RCH; DNQ	NHA; DNQ	DOV; DNQ	TAL	KAN	CLT	MAR	ATL	PHO	CAR	HOM	47th	314

=== Complete NASCAR Busch Series results ===
(key)

==== Primary Car results ====
Year	Driver	No.	Make	1	2	3	4	5	6	7	8	9	10	11	12	13	14	15	16	17	18	19	20	21	22	23	24	25	26	27	28	29	30	31	32	33	34	Owners	Pts
2001	Larry Foyt	14	Chevy	DAY; 19	CAR; 24	LVS; 31	ATL; 22	DAR; 30	BRI; 33	TEX; 22	NSH; 29	TAL; 12	CAL; 21	RCH; 27	NHA; 28	NZH; 26	CLT; 28	DOV; 41	KEN; 19	MLW; 23	GLN; 30	CHI; 22	GTY; 32	PPR; 34	IRP; 27	MCH; 18	BRI; 33	DAR; 39	RCH; INQ^{†}	DOV; 23	KAN; 30	CLT; 24	MEM; 17	PHO; 34	CAR; 29	HOM; 24		27th	2728
2001	Mark Green	14	Chevy																										RCH; 36									27th	2728
2002	Larry Foyt	14	Chevy	DAY; 15	CAR; 10	LVS; 27	DAR; 38	BRI; 20	TEX; 16	NSH; 25	TAL; 8	CAL; 31	RCH; 20	NHA; 19	NZH; 31	CLT; 27	DOV; 14	NSH; 17	KEN; 38	MLW; 23	DAY; 11	CHI; 22	GTY; 23	PPR; 28	IRP; 22	MCH; 26	BRI; 21	DAR; 26	RCH; 40	DOV; 28	KAN; 28	CLT; 17	MEM; 21	ATL; 27	CAR; 24	PHO; 25	HOM; 28	24th	3158

==== Secondary Car results ====
Year	Driver	No.	Make	1	2	3	4	5	6	7	8	9	10	11	12	13	14	15	16	17	18	19	20	21	22	23	24	25	26	27	28	29	30	31	32	33	Owners	Pts
2001	David Starr	41	Chevy	DAY	CAR	LVS	ATL	DAR	BRI	TEX; 17	NSH	TAL	CAL	RCH																							70th	164
2001	Mark Green	41	Chevy												NHA; 38	NZH	CLT	DOV	KEN	MLW	GLN	CHI	GTY	PPR	IRP	MCH	BRI	DAR	RCH	DOV	KAN	CLT	MEM	PHO	CAR	HOM	70th	164

=== Complete NASCAR Craftsman Truck Series results ===
(key)

==== Primary Truck results ====
Year	Driver	No.	Make	1	2	3	4	5	6	7	8	9	10	11	12	13	14	15	16	17	18	19	20	21	22	23	24	25	26	Owners	Pts
1995	A. J. Foyt	41	Ford	PHO	TUS	SGS	MMR	POR	EVG	I70	LVL	BRI	MLW	CNS	HPT	IRP	FLM	RCH	MAR	NWS	SON	MMR	PHO; 18								
1996	A. J. Foyt	51	Ford	HOM	PHO	POR	EVG	TUS	CNS	HPT	BRI	NZH	MLW	LVL	I70	IRP	FLM	GLN	NSV	RCH	NHA	MAR	NWS	SON	MMR	PHO; 33					
1996	A. J. Foyt	56	Ford																								LVS; 28				
1997	Joe Bessey	50	Ford	WDW	TUS	HOM	PHO	POR	EVG	I70	NHA	TEX	BRI	NZH	MLW	LVL	CNS	HPT	IRP	FLM	NSV	GLN	RCH	MAR	SON	MMR	CAL	PHO; 35		85th	167
1997	Ken Schrader	50	Ford																										LVS; 18	85th	167

== Drivers who have driven for A. J. Foyt Enterprises ==
=== USAC National Championship ===
- (United States) A. J. Foyt (1965–1979)
- (United States) Al Unser (1965)
- (United States) George Snider (1966, 1969–1970, 1972–1974, 1978)
- (United States) Joe Leonard (1967)
- (United States) Jim Hurtubise (1967)
- (United States) Jim McElreath (1968, 1970)
- (United States) Carl Williams (1968)
- (United States) Roger McCluskey (1969)
- (United States) Donnie Allison (1970–1971)
- (United States) Sam Sessions (1972, 1974)
- (United States) Rick Muther (1975)
- (United States) Bill Vukovich II (1977)

=== CART ===
- (United States) A. J. Foyt (1979–1993)
- (United States) George Snider (1980, 1983–1987, 1992)
- (United States) Johnny Rutherford (1984, 1988)
- (United States) Chip Ganassi (1985)
- (United States) Sammy Swindell (1986)
- (United States) Stan Fox (1987–1988)
- (United States) Davy Jones (1987, 1994)
- (United States) Rocky Moran (1988–1989)
- (United States) Mike Groff (1991–1992)
- (Mexico) Bernard Jourdain (1991)
- (United States) Al Unser, Sr. (1991)
- (United States) Jeff Andretti (1992)
- (Switzerland) Jon Beekhuis (1992)
- (United States) Brian Bonner (1992)
- (United States) Pancho Carter (1992)
- (Switzerland) Gregor Foitek (1992)
- (United States) Ross Cheever (1992)
- (United States) Robby Gordon (1993)
- (United States) John Andretti (1993–1994)
- (United States) Davy Jones (1994)
- (United States) Bryan Herta (1994)
- (United States) Eddie Cheever (1994–1995)
- (Sweden) Fredrik Ekblom (1995)
- (United States) Scott Sharp (1995)
- (United States) Brian Till (1995)

=== INDYCAR ===
- (Brazil) Marco Greco (1996)
- (United States) Mike Groff (1996)
- (United States) Davey Hamilton (1996–1997)
- (United States) Scott Sharp (1996–1997)
- (United States) Paul Durant (1997)
- (United States) Billy Boat (1997–2000)
- (United States) Greg Ray (1998, 2001–2002)
- (Sweden) Kenny Bräck (1998–1999)
- (United States) Robbie Buhl (1999)
- (United States) Jeff Ward (2000)
- (Chile) Eliseo Salazar (2000–2002)
- (United States) Robby Gordon (2001)
- (United States) Donnie Beechler (2001–2002)
- (United States) Richie Hearn (2002)
- (Brazil) Airton Daré (2002–2003)
- (United States) A. J. Foyt IV (2003–2005, 2009)
- (Japan) Shigeaki Hattori (2003)
- (United States) Larry Foyt (2004–2006)
- (United States) Jeff Bucknum (2005–2006)
- (Brazil) Felipe Giaffone (2005–2006)
- (United States) Al Unser Jr. (2007)
- (United Kingdom) Darren Manning (2007–2008)
- (United States) Ryan Hunter-Reay (2009)
- (Canada) Paul Tracy (2009)
- (Brazil) Vítor Meira (2009–2011)
- (United Kingdom) Mike Conway (2012)
- (Japan) Takuma Sato (2013–2016)
- (United States) Conor Daly (2013, 2017)
- (United Kingdom) Martin Plowman (2014)
- (United Kingdom) Jack Hawksworth (2015–2016)
- (Canada) Alex Tagliani (2015–2016)
- (Colombia) Carlos Muñoz (2017)
- (United States) Zach Veach (2017)
- (Brazil) Tony Kanaan (2018–2020)
- (Brazil) Matheus Leist (2018–2019)
- (France) Sébastien Bourdais (2020-2021)
- (Canada) Dalton Kellett (2020-2022)
- (United States) Charlie Kimball (2020)
- (Colombia) Tatiana Calderon (2022)
- (United States) Kyle Kirkwood (2022)
- (United States) Santino Ferrucci (2023-Present)
- (Denmark) Benjamin Pedersen (2023)
- (United States) Sting Ray Robb (2024)
- (United States) David Malukas (2025)
- (Brazil) Caio Collet (2026-Present)

=== NASCAR ===
==== Cup Series ====
- (United States) A. J. Foyt (1973–1974, 1977–1990, 1994)
- (United States) Johnny Rutherford (1977)
- (United States) Ron Hutcherson (1978)
- (United States) Don Whittington (1980)
- (United States) Tracy Leslie (1989)
- (United States) Mike Chase (1991)
- (United States) Mike Bliss (2000)
- (United States) Rick Mast (2000)
- (United States) Dick Trickle (2000)
- (United States) Ron Hornaday Jr. (2001)
- (United States) Stacy Compton (2002)
- (United States) P. J. Jones (2002)
- (United States) Mike Wallace (2002)
- (United States) Larry Foyt (2003–2004)

==== Grand National Series ====
- (United States) Larry Foyt (2001–2002)
- (United States) Mark Green (2001)
- (United States) David Starr (2001)

==== Truck Series ====
- (United States) Joe Bessey (1997)
- (United States) Ken Schrader (1997)

=== USAC Silver Crown ===
- (United States) Josh Wise (2006)
- (United States) Tracy Hines (2007)
- (Chile) Pablo Donoso (2007)
