= Machinists Union Racing =

Indy Car team

Machinists Union Racing was a CART Indy Car team owned by the International Association of Machinists and Aerospace Workers and run by the IAM's national automotive coordinator Andy Kenopensky, a former appointee to the United States Metric Board. The team competed in CART from 1981 to 1990.

The team was the brainchild of IAM president William Winpisinger. It began sponsoring racing in 1978 by sponsoring a USAC Champ Car race at Trenton Speedway and sponsoring the Indy Car driven by Jerry Karl. The union formed its own team in 1981. From 1981 to 1988 it was additionally sponsored by Schaefer Beer alongside the Machinists Union branding. The team's most notable drivers during this time were Josele Garza who drove for the team from 1983 to 1987 and Roger Mears who drove for the team in 1982 and 1983. Garza finished 12th in the CART championship in 1985 and 11th in 1987. Garza brought the team its best CART finish of second at the Michigan 500 in 1986. Mears finished 9th in 1982 and 12th in 1983 and finished fourth at Riverside International Raceway in 1982. Scott Atchison and Kevin Cogan drove for the team in 1988 and saw little success, although Cogan did register the team's best finish of third at the Long Beach Grand Prix in 1988, finishing 13th in the 1988 championship while Atchison finished 20th. Veteran driver Pancho Carter joined the team with co-sponsorship from Hardee's and finished 13th and 20th in two seasons with the team with a best finish of 7th, coming in his first race for the team.

All team members were card-carrying members of the IAM. They had initially experimented with building their own chassis in 1980 but it was abandoned before it hit the track.

Throughout his involvement in the sport, team manager Andy Kenopensky was a constant critic of CART's management of the sport and complained that the racing was too expensive and that rules were being crafted to benefit large-budget teams at the expense of small-budget teams such as his own.

The union and Schaefer also sponsored a NASCAR Winston Cup entry for Joe Ruttman in the 1989 Daytona 500 fielded by CalCar Motorsports.

== Drivers ==
- (United States) Scott Atchison (1988)
- (United States) Pancho Carter (1987, 1989–1990)
- (United States) Kevin Cogan (1988–1989)
- (United States) Larry Dickson (1981)
- (United States) Chip Ganassi (1985–1986)
- (Mexico) Josele Garza (1983–1987)
- (United States) Pete Halsmer (1985)
- (United States) Jerry Karl (1978)
- (United Kingdom) Rupert Keegan (1985)
- (United States) Peter Kuhn (1984)
- (Netherlands) Jan Lammers (1986)
- (United States) Randy Lewis (1984)
- (United States) Roger Mears (1982–1983)
- (United States) Rick Miaskiewicz (1987)
- (United States) Mike Nish (1986)
- (United States) Johnny Parsons (1984, 1986)
- (United States) Scott Pruett (1988)
- (United States) Chip Robinson (1987)
- (United States) Tom Sneva (1987)
- (United States) Sammy Swindell (1987) (failed to qualify)
- (United States) Phil Threshie (1980)
- (United States) Rich Vogler (1988)
- (South Africa) Desiré Wilson (1986)

== Complete Racing Results ==
=== PPG CART Indycar World Series ===
(key)

Year	Chassis	Engine	Drivers	No.	1	2	3	4	5	6	7	8	9	10	11	12	13	14	15	16	17
1980					ONT	INDY	MIL	POC	MDO	MCH	WGL	MIL	ONT	MCH	MXC	PHX					
1980	IAM 001	Donovan V8	(United States) Phil Threshie	30		DNQ	22	25		DNQ		DNQ									
1980	IAM 001	Donovan V8	(United States) Larry Dickson	30									35			22					
1981					PHX	MIL	ATL		MCH	RIV	MIL	MCH	WGL	MXC	PHX						
1981	Penske PC-7/79	Cosworth DFX	(United States) Larry Dickson	31		10	10	12	9	16	12	8	7	22	DNQ						
1981	IAM 001	Donovan V8	(Belgium) Teddy Pilette	67										DNQ^{1}							
1982					PHX	ATL	MIL	CLE	MCH	MIL	POC	RIV	ROA	MCH	PHX						
1982	Penske PC-9B/81	Cosworth DFX	(United States) Roger Mears	31	8		22	21													
1982	Penske PC-7/79	Cosworth DFX	(United States) Roger Mears	31		4			17	14	9	4	8	8							
1982	Penske PC-10/82	Cosworth DFX	(United States) Roger Mears	9											7						
1983					ATL	INDY	MIL	CLE	MCH	ROA	POC	RIV	MDO	MCH	CPL	LAG	PHX				
1983	Penske PC-10/82	Cosworth DFX	(United States) Roger Mears	9	7	28	8	6	DNQ	8	16	9	12	16	7	6	16				
1983	Penske PC-10/82	Cosworth DFX	(Mexico) Josele Garza	55		25		17	19	11	9	20	23	17	11	12					
1984					LBH	PHX	INDY	MIL	POR	MEA	CLE	MCH	ROA	POC	MDO	SAN	MCH	PHX	LAG	CPL	
1984	Penske PC-10/82	Cosworth DFX	(Mexico) Josele Garza	55	23	DNQ															
1984	March 84C	Cosworth DFX	(Mexico) Josele Garza	55			10	DNS	7	23	17	11	7	25	11	4	10	8	13	10	
1984	Penske PC-10/82	Cosworth DFX	(United States) Roger Mears	55			DNQ														
1985					LBH	INDY	MIL	POR	MEA	CLE	MCH	ROA	POC	MDO	SAN	MCH	LAG	PHX	MIA		
1985	March 85C	Cosworth DFX	(Mexico) Josele Garza	55	28	31	7	12	27	6	19	18	26	11	6	6	7	10	9		
1985	March 85C	Cosworth DFX	(United States) Pete Halsmer	59		DNQ	15	8	19							11					
1985	March 85C	Cosworth DFX	(United States) Chip Ganassi	59							22										
1985	March 85C	Cosworth DFX	(United Kingdom) Rupert Keegan	59										19			12		10		
1986					PHX	LBH	INDY	MIL	POR	MEA	CLE	TOR	MCH	POC	MDO	SAN	MCH	ROA	LAG	PHX	MIA
1986	March 85C/86C	Cosworth DFX	(Mexico) Josele Garza	55	23	7	18	7	17	8	7	23	2	7	14						24
1986	March 85C/86C	Cosworth DFX	(South Africa) Desiré Wilson	55														19	16		
1986	March 85C/86C	Cosworth DFX	(South Africa) Desiré Wilson	59											13						
1986	March 85C/86C	Cosworth DFX	(United States) Chip Ganassi	59	14		21														
1986	March 85C/86C	Cosworth DFX	(United States) Rick Miaskiewicz (R)	59														DNS			
1986	March 85C/86C	Cosworth DFX	(United States) Johnny Parsons	59				22			21		16	29							
1986	March 85C/86C	Cosworth DFX	(United States) Johnny Parsons	95			27														
1986	March 85C/86C	Cosworth DFX	(United States) Johnny Parsons	55												7	23			11	
1986	March 85C/86C	Cosworth DFX	(United States) Mike Nish (R)	45			DNQ														
1986	March 85C/86C	Cosworth DFX	(United States) Mike Nish (R)	59				DNS	10	24		22									
1986	Eagle 86GC	Cosworth DFX	(Netherlands) Jan Lammers	59															8	23	9
1987					LBH	PHX	INDY	MIL	POR	MEA	CLE	TOR	MCH	POC	ROA	MDO	NAZ	LAG	MIA		
1987	March 87C	Cosworth DFX	(United States) Pancho Carter	29			27						20	6	14	14	17	12	14		
1987	March 87C	Cosworth DFX	(Mexico) Josele Garza	55	5	6	17	22	6	24	16	17	12	11	11	8	8	8	18		
1987	March 86C	Cosworth DFX	(United States) Mike Nish	59	DNQ	DNQ															
1987	March 86C	Cosworth DFX	(United States) Rick Miaskiewicz	59							14	12				16					
1987	March 87C	Cosworth DFX	(United States) Rick Miaskiewicz	59					22												
1987	March 86C	Cosworth DFX	(United States) Tony Bettenhausen Jr.	59				DNQ													
1987	March 86C	Pontiac V8	(United States) Sammy Swindell	59			DNQ														
1988					PHX	LBH	INDY	MIL	POR	CLE	TOR	MEA	MCH	POC	MDO	ROA	NAZ	LAG	MIA		
1988	March 88C	Cosworth DFX	(United States) Kevin Cogan	11			11	22	20	10	24					24	15	9	4		
1988	March 87C	Cosworth DFX	(United States) Kevin Cogan	11	8	3															
1988	March 87C	Cosworth DFX	(United States) Scott Pruett	11								16			20						
1988	March 87C	Cosworth DFX	(United States) Rich Vogler	11									15	11							
1988	March 87C	Cosworth DFX	(United States) Rich Vogler	29			17														
1988	March 87C	Cosworth DFX	(United States) Scott Atchison	55			DNQ											25	9		
1988	March 86C	Cosworth DFX	(United States) Scott Atchison	55	12	9	DNQ	16	25	12	13	10	10	12	15	20	DNQ				
1989					PHX	LBH	INDY	MIL	DET	POR	CLE	MEA	TOR	MCH	POC	MDO	ROA	NAZ	LAG		
1989	March 88C	Cosworth DFX	(United States) Kevin Cogan	11	10	26	32	19	17	24	11	12	9	25	22	10	18		8		
1989	March 88C	Cosworth DFX	(United States) Johnny Rutherford	11														DNQ			
1989	March 88C	Cosworth DFX	(United States) Rich Vogler	29			DNQ														

1. Ran in conjunction with Mergard Racing.
