= 1986 CART PPG Indy Car World Series =

American motorsport season

1986 CART season
- PPG Indy Car World Series
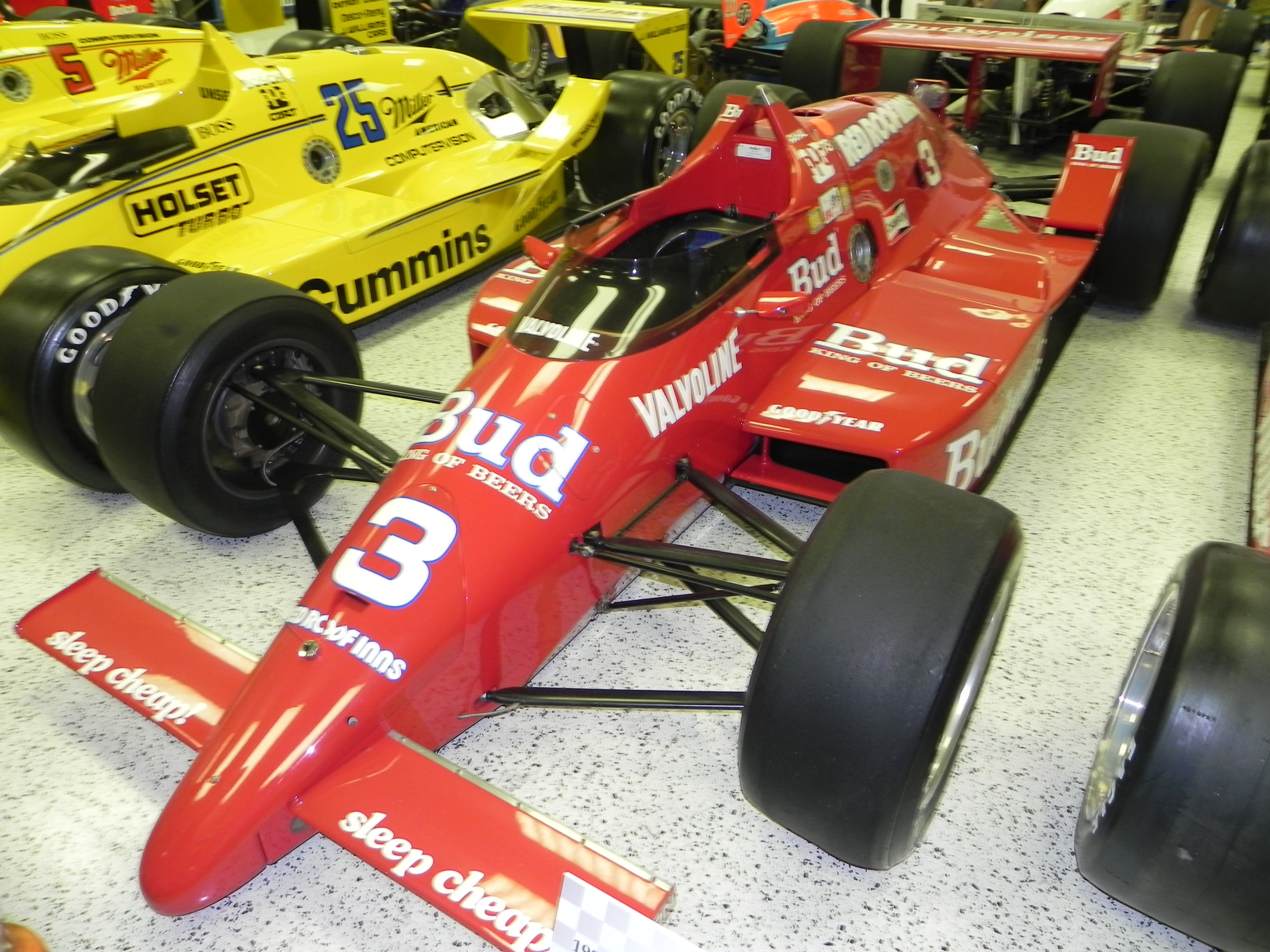
- Bobby Rahal

Season
- Races: 17
- Start date: April 6
- End date: November 11

Awards
- Drivers' champion: (United States) Bobby Rahal
- Constructors' Cup: (United Kingdom) March
- Manufacturers' Cup: (United Kingdom) Cosworth
- Nations' Cup: United States
- Rookie of the Year: (United States) Chip Robinson
- Indianapolis 500 winner: (United States) Bobby Rahal

The 1986 CART PPG Indy Car World Series season was the 8th national championship season of American open wheel racing sanctioned by CART. The season consisted of 17 races, and one non-points exhibition event. Bobby Rahal was the national champion, and the rookie of the year was Chip Robinson. The 1986 Indianapolis 500 was sanctioned by USAC, but counted towards the CART points championship. Bobby Rahal won the Indy 500, and would later become the first driver since 1980 to win Indy and the CART championship in the same season.

The first two races of the season were won by Kevin Cogan (Phoenix) and Michael Andretti (Long Beach), respectively, the first career wins for both drivers on the CART circuit. Rain delayed the Indianapolis 500, postponing it for six days. Bobby Rahal, driving for Truesports, passed Kevin Cogan with two laps to go, and won for car owner Jim Trueman, who was stricken with cancer. Trueman died less than two weeks later.

The season would shape up as a two-man battle between Rahal and Michael Andretti. Andretti won at Milwaukee, which put him in the points lead for the first time. On Father's Day, Andretti was leading on the final lap at Portland. His car ran out of fuel on the final turn of the final lap, and his father Mario beat him to the finish line by 0.07 seconds. It would go down in lore as one of the most shocking finishes in Indy car history, as well as the closest finish in Indy car history on a road course (until 1997).

Rahal was back in victory lane in July, winning the inaugural Molson Indy Toronto, but Michael Andretti still held the points lead. Rahal won four out of five races during a stretch in August and September, and emerged with a 9-point lead in the standings with two races left. Michael Andretti won a key victory at the second-to-last race of the season at Phoenix, while Rahal finished 3rd.

Going into the season finale at Tamiami Park, Rahal held a scant 3-point lead over Andretti. Neither driver was a factor at Miami, and just past the halfway point, Andretti dropped out with a broken halfshaft. Rahal effectively clinched the championship when Andretti dropped out. Roberto Guerrero won the pole and dominated the race, leading the first 111 laps. But on the final lap, his car sputtered and he ran out of fuel. Al Unser Jr. slipped by to steal the victory, his lone win of 1986. Unser Jr. won from 19th starting position, the furthest back any driver had won a CART road/street course race at the time.

== Drivers and teams ==
The following teams and drivers competed in the 1986 Indy Car World Series season. All cars used Goodyear tires.

Team	Chassis*	Engine*	No**	Drivers	Rounds
Bignotti-Cotter Racing	March 86C	Cosworth DFX	2 (5)	(Colombia) Roberto Guerrero	All
Curb-All American Racers	March 86C	Cosworth DFX	33	(United States) Tom Sneva	All
Curb-All American Racers	March 86C	Cosworth DFX	66	(United States) Ed Pimm	All except 8, 11–12, 14
Curb-All American Racers	March 86C	Cosworth DFX	66	(Republic of Ireland) Derek Daly	8, 11–12, 14
Curb-All American Racers	Eagle 86GC	Cosworth DFX	98	(Netherlands) Jan Lammers	1-3
Dick Simon Racing	Lola T86/00	Cosworth DFX	22	(Brazil) Raul Boesel	All
Dick Simon Racing	Lola T86/00	Cosworth DFX	23	(United States) Dick Simon	3, 10, 12
Dick Simon Racing	Lola T86/00	Cosworth DFX	23	(United States) Chip Robinson	6-7, 17
Dick Simon Racing	Lola T86/00	Cosworth DFX	23	(United Kingdom) Ian Ashley	8, 11, 14
Galles Racing	Lola T86/00 (2–11, 13–17); March 86C(1, 12)	Cosworth DFX (1–4, 12–17); Honda/Judd (5–11)	8	(Australia) Geoff Brabham	All
Galles Racing	Lola T86/00	Cosworth DFX	9	(Brazil) Roberto Moreno	1–11, 13–17
Galles Racing	Lola T86/00	Cosworth DFX	9	(United States) Pancho Carter	12
Galles Racing	Lola T86/00	Cosworth DFX	15	(United States) Pancho Carter	3, 9–10
Hemelgarn Racing	March 86C (1, 3, 9–10, 13)	Cosworth DFX (1, 9–10, 13); Buick V-6 (3)	71	(United States) Scott Brayton	1, 3, 9–10, 13
Hemelgarn Racing	March 86C (1, 3, 9–10, 13)	Cosworth DFX	71	(Canada) Jacques Villeneuve Sr.	2, 4–8, 11–12, 14–17
Hemelgarn Racing	March 86C (1, 3, 9–10, 13)	Cosworth DFX	81	(Canada) Jacques Villeneuve Sr.	3
Kraco Racing	March 86C	Cosworth DFX	18	(United States) Michael Andretti	All
Leader Card Racing	March 86C	Cosworth DFX	24	(United States) Gary Bettenhausen	1, 3–4, 9–10, 12–13, 16
Leader Card Racing	March 86C	Cosworth DFX	24	(United States) Dominic Dobson	2, 5–8, 11, 14–15, 17
Leader Card Racing	March 85C	Cosworth DFX	42	(United States) Phil Krueger	3
Machinists Union Racing	March 86C	Cosworth DFX	55	(Mexico) Josele Garza	1–11, 17
Machinists Union Racing	March 86C	Cosworth DFX	55	(United States) Johnny Parsons	12-13, 16
Machinists Union Racing	March 86C	Cosworth DFX	55	(South Africa) Desiré Wilson	14-15
Machinists Union Racing	March 86C	Cosworth DFX	59	(South Africa) Desiré Wilson	11
Machinists Union Racing	March 86C	Cosworth DFX	59	(United States) Chip Ganassi	1, 3
Machinists Union Racing	March 86C	Cosworth DFX	59	(United States) Johnny Parsons	4, 7, 9–10
Machinists Union Racing	March 86C	Cosworth DFX	95	(United States) Johnny Parsons	3
Alex Morales Motorsports	March 86C	Cosworth DFX	6	(United States) Rich Vogler	3
Alex Morales Motorsports	March 86C	Cosworth DFX	21	(United States) Johnny Rutherford	All
Newman/Haas Racing	Lola T86/00	Cosworth DFX	5 (2)	(United States) Mario Andretti	All
Patrick Racing	March 86C	Cosworth DFX	7	(United States) Kevin Cogan	All
Patrick Racing	March 86C	Cosworth DFX	20	(Brazil) Emerson Fittipaldi	All
Penske Racing	March 86C (1, 3–5, 7–11, 13–16); Penske PC-15 (2, 6, 12, 17)	Cosworth DFX (1, 3–5, 7–10); Chevy 265A (2, 6, 11–17)	1/ 86 (4)	(United States) Rick Mears	All
Penske Racing	March 86C (1–16); Penske PC-15 (17)	Cosworth DFX (1–16); Chevy 265A (17)	4 (1)	(United States) Danny Sullivan	All
Penske Racing	March 86C (9–10, 17); Penske PC-15 (1, 3)	Chevy 265A (1, 3, 9–10, 17	11	(United States) Al Unser	1, 3, 9–10, 17
Doug Shierson Racing	Lola T86/00	Cosworth DFX	30	(United States) Al Unser Jr.	All
Truesports	March 86C	Cosworth DFX	3	(United States) Bobby Rahal	All
Part-time entries
A. J. Foyt Enterprises	March 86C	Cosworth DFX	14	(United States) A. J. Foyt	1, 3–4, 9–10, 13, 16–17
A. J. Foyt Enterprises	March 86C	Chevy V6	44	(United States) Mike Nish	3
A. J. Foyt Enterprises	March 86C	Cosworth DFX	84	(United States) George Snider	3, 9
A. J. Foyt Enterprises	March 86C	Cosworth DFX	84	(United States) Sammy Swindell	10
Arciero Racing	March 86C March 85C (11, 13)	Cosworth DFX	12	(United States) Randy Lanier	1–9
Arciero Racing	March 86C March 85C (11, 13)	Cosworth DFX	12	(United States) Steve Chassey	11, 14–16
Arciero Racing	March 86C March 85C (11, 13)	Cosworth DFX	12	(United States) Eddie Cheever	17
Arciero Racing	March 86C March 85C (11, 13)	Cosworth DFX	12	(United States) Jeff MacPherson	13
Bettenhausen Motorsports	March 86C	Cosworth DFX	16	(United States) Tony Bettenhausen Jr.	3
Bettenhausen Motorsports	Lola T86/00/ March 86C	Cosworth DFX	61	(Netherlands) Arie Luyendyk	All except 5 and 12
Dale Coyne Racing	Coyne DC-1	Chevy	19	(United States) Dale Coyne	All except 3–4
Gohr Racing	March 86C	Buick V-6 (Until Mid-Ohio) Cosworth DFX	56	(United States) Steve Chassey	3–4, 9
Gohr Racing	March 86C	Buick V-6 (Until Mid-Ohio) Cosworth DFX	56	(United States) Rocky Moran	6-7, 10–11, 13–17
Gohr Racing	March 86C	Buick V-6 (Until Mid-Ohio) Cosworth DFX	56	(United States) John Morton	8
Gohr Racing	March 85C	Buick V-6	65	(United Kingdom) Rupert Keegan	3
J.P. Racing	Lola T900	Cosworth DFX	10	(United States) Spike Gehlhausen	3, 9–10, 13
March Engineering	March 86C	Buick V-6	25	(United States) Danny Ongais	3
March Engineering	March 86C	Buick V-6	31	(United Kingdom) Jim Crawford	3
Mosquito Autosport	March 85C	Cosworth DFX	16 (19)	(United States) Rick Miaskiewicz	2–4, 6–8
Pace Racing	Lola T86/00	Cosworth DFX	36	(United States) Randy Lewis	2, 6–8, 11, 14–15, 17
Pace Racing	Lola T86/00	Cosworth DFX	36	(Australia) Dennis Firestone	3, 9–10, 12, 13, 16
Team Menard	March 86C	Cosworth DFX	28	(United States) Herm Johnson	3

* The number in parentheses for chassis & engine indicates the round number it was used at.

** The number in parentheses for car number is the number the car used at the Indianapolis 500, if a different number was used.

== Schedule ==
Icon	Legend
O	Oval/Speedway
R	Road course
S	Street circuit

Rd	Date	Name	Circuit	Location
1	April 6	(United States) Dana 200	O Phoenix International Raceway	Avondale, Arizona
2	April 13	(United States) Toyota Grand Prix of Long Beach	S Streets of Long Beach	Long Beach, California
3	May 31*	(United States) Indianapolis 500	O Indianapolis Motor Speedway	Indianapolis, Indiana
4	June 8**	(United States) Miller American 200	O Milwaukee Mile	West Allis, Wisconsin
5	June 15	(United States) Budweiser/G.I. Joe's 200	R Portland International Raceway	Portland, Oregon
6	June 29	(United States) Chase Grand Prix at the Meadowlands	S Meadowlands Sports Complex	East Rutherford, New Jersey
7	July 6	(United States) Budweiser Cleveland Grand Prix	S Burke Lakefront Airport	Cleveland, Ohio
8	July 20	(Canada) Molson Indy Toronto	S Streets of Toronto	Toronto, Ontario
9	August 2	(United States) Michigan 500	O Michigan International Speedway	Brooklyn, Michigan
10	August 17	(United States) Domino's Pizza 500	O Pocono International Raceway	Long Pond, Pennsylvania
11	August 31	(United States) Escort Radar Warning 200	R Mid-Ohio Sports Car Course	Lexington, Ohio
12	September 7	(Canada) Molson Indy Montreal	O Sanair Super Speedway	Saint-Pie, Quebec
13	September 28	(United States) Pepsi Cola 250	O Michigan International Speedway	Brooklyn, Michigan
14	October 4***	(United States) Race For Life 200	R Road America	Elkhart Lake, Wisconsin
15	October 12	(United States) Nissan Monterey Grand Prix	R Laguna Seca Raceway	Monterey, California
16	October 19	(United States) Circle K/Fiesta Bowl 200	O Phoenix International Raceway	Avondale, Arizona
17	November 9	(United States) Nissan Indy Challenge	S Tamiami Park	Miami, Florida

* The Indianapolis 500 was scheduled for May 25, but postponed due to rain.

** The Miller American 200 in Honor of Rex Mays was scheduled for June 1, but postponed due to the delay of running the Indianapolis 500 on May 31.

*** The Road America race was started on September 21, but stopped after a few laps due to rain, the rest was run on October 4.

== Results ==
Rd	Event name	Pole position	Winner	Winning team	Race time
1	Dana 200 for Special Olympics	(United States) Mario Andretti	(United States) Kevin Cogan	Patrick Racing	1:39:42
2	Toyota Grand Prix of Long Beach	(United States) Danny Sullivan	(United States) Michael Andretti	Kraco Racing	1:57:34
3	Indianapolis 500	(United States) Rick Mears	(United States) Bobby Rahal	Truesports	2:55:43
4	Miller American 200 in Honor of Rex Mays	(United States) Michael Andretti	(United States) Michael Andretti	Kraco Racing	1:42:45
5	Budweiser/G.I. Joe's 200	(Brazil) Emerson Fittipaldi	(United States) Mario Andretti	Newman/Haas Racing	1:50:53
6	Chase Grand Prix at the Meadowlands	(United States) Michael Andretti	(United States) Danny Sullivan	Team Penske	1:49:17
7	Budweiser Cleveland Grand Prix	(United States) Danny Sullivan	(United States) Danny Sullivan	Team Penske	1:43:01
8	Molson Indy Toronto	(Brazil) Emerson Fittipaldi	(United States) Bobby Rahal	Truesports	2:05:50
9	Michigan 500	(United States) Rick Mears	(United States) Johnny Rutherford	Alex Morales Motorsports	3:38:45
10	Domino's Pizza 500	(United States) Michael Andretti	(United States) Mario Andretti	Newman/Haas Racing	3:17:13
11	Escort Radar Warning 200	(United States) Mario Andretti	(United States) Bobby Rahal	Truesports	1:56:18
12	Molson Indy Montreal	(United States) Rick Mears	(United States) Bobby Rahal	Truesports	1:48:05
13	Pepsi Cola 250	(United States) Rick Mears	(United States) Bobby Rahal	Truesports	1:22:33
14	Race for Life 200	(United States) Bobby Rahal	(Brazil) Emerson Fittipaldi	Patrick Racing	2:26:42
15	Champion Spark Plug 300k	(United States) Mario Andretti	(United States) Bobby Rahal	Truesports	1:33:20
16	Circle K/Fiesta Bowl 200	(United States) Bobby Rahal	(United States) Michael Andretti	Kraco Racing	1:29:06
17	Nissan Indy Challenge	(Colombia) Roberto Guerrero	(United States) Al Unser Jr.	Doug Shierson Racing	1:52:45

* Indianapolis was USAC-sanctioned but counted towards the CART title.

=== Drivers points standings ===
Pos	Driver	PHX1 (United States)	LBH (United States)	INDY (United States)	MIL (United States)	POR (United States)	MEA (United States)	CLE (United States)	TOR (Canada)	MIS1 (United States)	POC (United States)	MOH (United States)	SAN (Canada)	MIS2 (United States)	ROA (United States)	LAG (United States)	PHX2 (United States)	TAM (United States)	Pts
1	(United States) Bobby Rahal	16	18	1	6	20	3	15	1	10*	14	1	1*	1	**5**	1*	**3**	8	179
2	(United States) Michael Andretti	15*	1*	6	**1***	2*	**20**	2	19	11	**11***	10	6	2*	2*	3	1*	18	171
3	(United States) Danny Sullivan	4	**11**	9	11	11	1	**1***	2	25	16	3*	5	12	6	2	2	26	147
4	(United States) Al Unser Jr.	12	2	5	8	3	9	8	4*	8	6	5	2	21	11	23	6	1	137
5	(United States) Mario Andretti	**7**	5	32	5	1	24	3	3	21	1	**24**	8	10	9	**4**	4	11	136
6	(United States) Kevin Cogan	1	17	2	12	14	21	23	5	22	2	4	4	4	20	9	14	4	115
7	(Brazil) Emerson Fittipaldi	3	16	7	24	**12**	2	13	**17**	20	19	21	3	3	1	7	5	20	103
8	(United States) Rick Mears	19	20	**3***	3	16	19	4	8	**12**	8	17	**18**	**8**	3	17	20	3	89
9	(Colombia) Roberto Guerrero	8	DNS	4	18	13	4*	17	20	24	21	2	17	22	4	5	12	**2***	87
10	(United States) Tom Sneva	2	4	33	2	4	17	5	9	18	15	12	13	5	12	22	18	22	82
11	(United States) Johnny Rutherford	5	9	8	4	15	7	10	10	1	18	8	16	9	14	12	9	12	78
12	(Australia) Geoff Brabham	10	3	12	21	7	22	14	14	4	12	20	11	11	22	6	8	5	64
13	(Brazil) Raul Boesel	13	19	13	14	8	23	6	7	5	5	7	9	15	8	14	13	19	54
14	(Mexico) Josele Garza	23	7	18	7	17	8	7	23	2	7	14						24	45
15	(Canada) Jacques Villeneuve Sr.		8	20	15	5	5	19	24			11	19		10	19	16	6	38
16	(Brazil) Roberto Moreno	20	6	19	13	18	18	25	18	6	10	16		6	16	20	10	17	30
17	(Netherlands) Arie Luyendyk	6	15	15	9		16	24	6	23	17	18		13	7	10	15	21	29
18	(United States) Ed Pimm	22	22	17	10	6	12	Wth		15	24			7		11	7	10	29
19	(United States) Pancho Carter			16						3	3		15						28
20	(United States) Randy Lanier	11	13	10	20	9	6	9	21	19									21
21	(United States) A. J. Foyt	17		24	19					9	4			16			22	23	16
22	(Netherlands) Jan Lammers	9	14	Wth												8	23	9	13
23	(Republic of Ireland) Derek Daly			DNQ								6	10		13				11
24	(United States) Johnny Parsons			27	22			21		16	29		7	23			11		8
25	(United States) Randy Lewis		10				10	20	11			15			24	18		14	8
26	(United States) Chip Robinson RY						14											7	6
27	(United States) Spike Gehlhausen			DNQ						7	22			18					6
28	(United Kingdom) Ian Ashley								15			9			23				4
29	(United States) Sammy Swindell										9								4
30	(United States) Mike Nish R			DNQ	DNS	10	24		22								Wth		3
31	(United States) Dominic Dobson R		12			19	11	18	16			19			18	21		13	3
32	(United States) Rick Miaskiewicz R		21	DNQ	16		15	11	13	DNS									2
33	(United States) Gary Bettenhausen	21		11	23					26	13		21	20			19		2
34	(United States) Dale Coyne	Wth	23			21	DNS	12	DNQ	Wth	26	23	12	Wth	17	DNQ	Wth	25	2
35	(United States) John Morton								12										1
36	(United States) Rocky Moran R						13	16			25	25		DNQ	21	15	21	16	0
37	(United States) Jeff MacPherson											22			15	13	Wth		0
38	(South Africa) Desiré Wilson											13			19	16			0
39	(United States) Scott Brayton	24		30						13	27			19					0
40	(Australia) Dennis Firestone			Wth						17	28		14	14			17		0
41	(United States) Al Unser	18		22						14	20							15	0
42	(United States) Dick Simon			14				22			23		20						0
43	(United States) Chip Ganassi	14		21															0
44	(United States) Steve Chassey			DNQ	17					28				17					0
45	(United States) Danny Ongais			23															0
46	(United States) Tom Phillips															24			0
47	(United States) Rich Vogler			25															0
48	(United States) George Snider			26						27									0
49	(United States) Eddie Cheever																	27	0
50	(United States) Tony Bettenhausen Jr.			28															0
51	(United Kingdom) Jim Crawford			29															0
52	(United States) Phil Krueger			31															0
-	(United Kingdom) Rupert Keegan R			Wth															-
-	(United States) Herm Johnson			Wth															-
-	(United States) John Paul Jr.			Wth															-
Pos	Driver	PHX1 (United States)	LBH (United States)	INDY (United States)	MIL (United States)	POR (United States)	MEA (United States)	CLE (United States)	TOR (Canada)	MIS1 (United States)	POC (United States)	MOH (United States)	SAN (Canada)	MIS2 (United States)	ROA (United States)	LAG (United States)	PHX2 (United States)	TAM (United States)	Pts

Color	Result
Gold	Winner
Silver	2nd place
Bronze	3rd place
Green	4th-6th place
Light Blue	7th–12th place
Dark Blue	Finished (Outside Top 12)
Purple	Did not finish
Red	Did not qualify (DNQ)
Brown	Withdrawn (Wth)
Black	Disqualified (DSQ)
White	Did not start (DNS)
Blank	Did not participate (DNP)
Blank	Driver replacement (Rpl)
Blank	Injured (Inj)
Blank	Race not held (NH)
Blank	Not competing

**In-line notation**
**Bold**	Pole position
Italics	Ran fastest race lap
*	Led most race laps
RY	Rookie of the Year
R	Rookie

== See also ==
- 1986 Indianapolis 500
- 1986 American Racing Series season
