= Indianapolis 500 traditions =

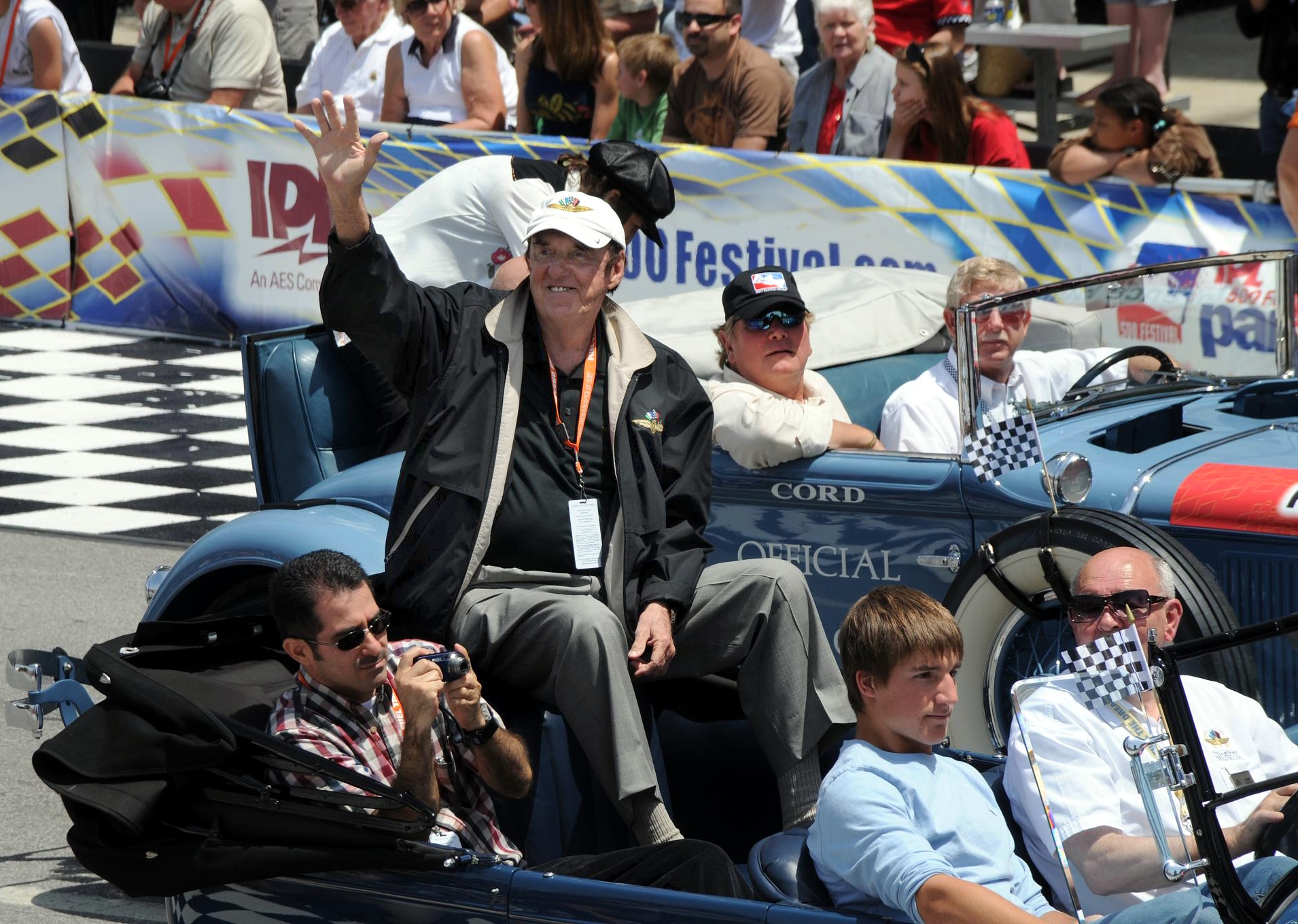
Jim Nabors (pictured in 2008) performed "Back Home Again in Indiana" before the start of the race nearly every year from 1972 to 2014.

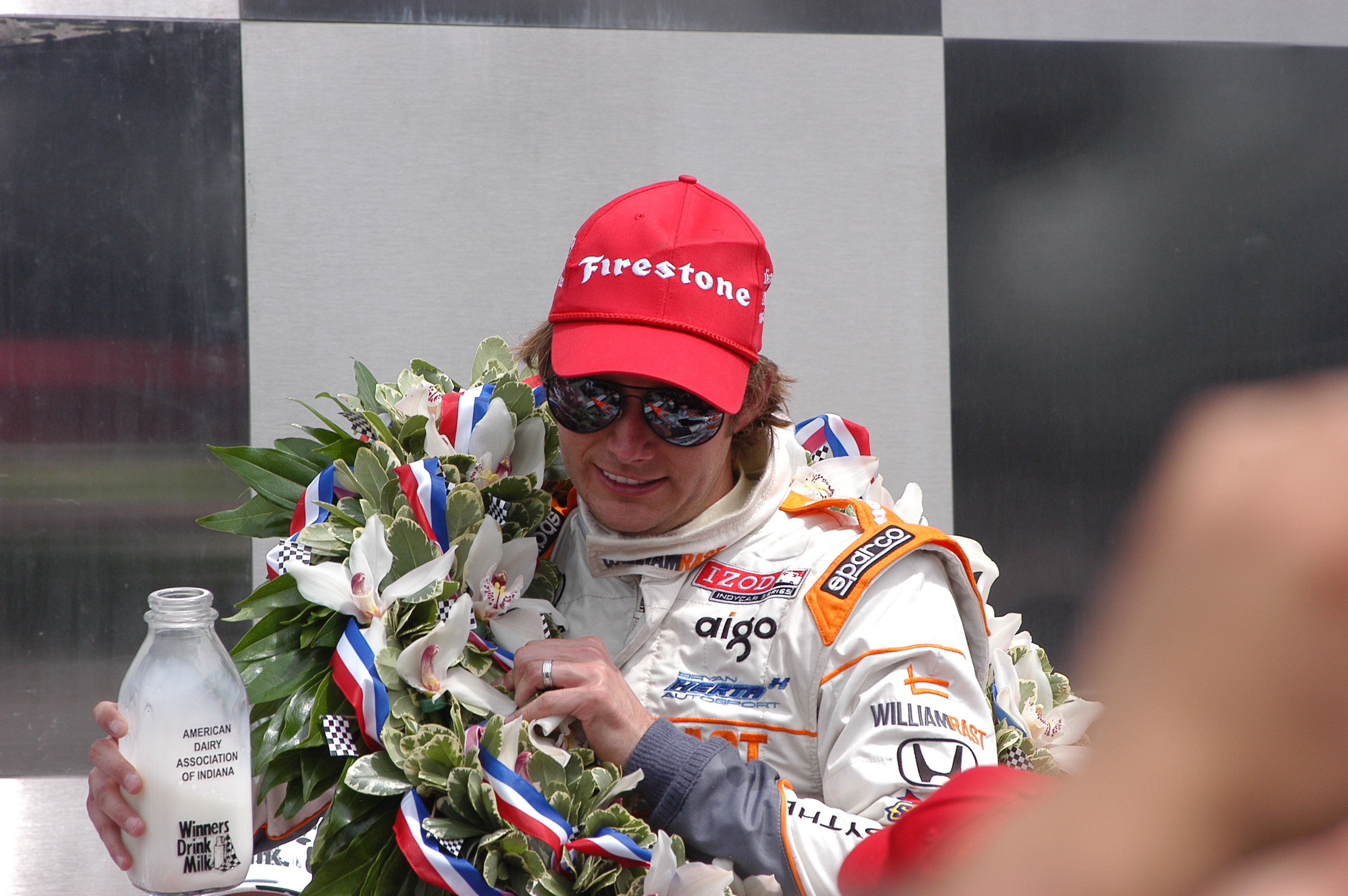
2011 Indianapolis 500 winner Dan Wheldon celebrating with a bottle of milk in victory lane.

Due to the longevity of the Indianapolis 500, numerous traditions surrounding the race have developed over the years. Traditions include procedures for the running of the race, scheduling, and pre-race and post-race festivities. For many fans, these traditions are an important aspect of the race, and they have often reacted quite negatively when the traditions are changed or broken.

As part of the Memorial Day holiday weekend, the pre-race ceremonies of the Indianapolis 500 feature several patriotic songs. Like most other sporting events, the national anthem is performed before the race by a notable vocalist. The most noteworthy and most popular traditions are the annual singing of the chorus of "Back Home Again in Indiana," and the victory lane bottle of milk.

== Month of May ==
The two to three weeks of practice and qualifying leading up to the Indianapolis 500 is known in racing circles simply as "the month of May [at Indianapolis]". In early years, the track traditionally opened for practice on May 1 (regardless of the day of the week). This practice dated back to 1911. The policy was typically to make the track available for practice no later than May 1, although in most years, few if any competitors might be on the grounds yet. It was not uncommon for local entries to begin setting up in the garage area in early/mid-April to work on their cars. Out-of-town or overseas entries sometimes arrived in Indianapolis (sometimes after lengthy travels) and set up shop in a local garage before moving into the track. In some years, the track might even be available for practice and testing as early as mid-April. For instance, in 1932, cars began to arrive on April 6, and in 1969, the first day of practice was April 28. In very early years, it was not uncommon for the track to be closed on Sundays during practice, or be open for only competitors with the gates closed to the public. In 1974, due to the energy crisis, the schedule was reduced, and the track opened instead three weeks before race day. The change was well-received, and the new schedule was made permanent, with various tweaks over the years.

In 2014, a second race at Indianapolis was introduced to the IndyCar Series schedule, conducted on the track's road course. The new event is held two weeks before the 500.

Though not part of the month of May, since the mid-2010s, Founders Day has been recognized and celebrated at the Speedway each year on March 20. That coincides with the date in 1909 in which the Speedway was incorporated. Since 2017, Founders Day has sometimes been used to announce inductees of the Indianapolis Motor Speedway Hall of Fame, with the formal induction taking place during the month of May.

=== Memorial Day ===
The race has always been scheduled in conjunction with Memorial Day. Through 1970, the race was held on Memorial Day proper (May 30), regardless of the day of the week, unless it fell on Sunday. In those cases, it was scheduled for Monday, May 31. After the Uniform Monday Holiday Act took effect in 1971, the race was scheduled as part of the three-day Memorial Day weekend – either the Saturday, the Sunday, or the Monday of the holiday weekend. Since 1974, the race has been scheduled for the Sunday of Memorial Day weekend and has been held on a Sunday with only two exceptions due to rain delays. The race is often held on the same day as Formula One's Monaco Grand Prix and the NASCAR Cup Series's Coca-Cola 600, making for one of the largest weekends in motor racing.

Sundays were avoided for scheduling race activity dating back to pre-500 races in 1909 and 1910. In the early decades, Sundays were occasionally used for practice and/or qualifying, but were used sparingly in pre-World War II years. In some early years, practice may have been permitted on Sundays, but the gates might not be open to the public. When Tony Hulman bought the Speedway after World War II, Speedway management continued to refuse to schedule the race on a Sunday, a policy that stayed in place through 1973. Qualifying and practice, however, were regularly held on Sundays during those years, with no days closed to spectators.

- From 1911 to 1970, the race was scheduled for May 30, regardless of the day of the week. If May 30 fell on a Sunday, the race was scheduled for Monday, May 31.
  - For the first 500 in 1911, May 30 fell on a Tuesday.
  - In 1915, May 30 fell on a Sunday, and the race was initially scheduled for Saturday, May 29. Heavy rains fell in the days leading up to the race flooding the grounds and making some dirt roads leading to the track impassible. A few days before the race was to be held, officials decided to postpone the race until Monday, May 31, in order to allow time for the grounds to dry out.
  - In 1919, the race was held on Saturday, May 31. It was the first race after the conclusion of World War I. The race was deliberately moved off Memorial Day (Friday, May 30) and pushed to Saturday so as not to detract from the holiday.
  - May 30 fell on Sunday in 1920, 1926, 1937, 1948, 1954, and 1965. In each of those years, the race was held on Monday, May 31.
  - The final race under that scheduling format (1970) was on Saturday, May 30.
- In 1971 and 1972, the race was scheduled for and held on the Saturday of Memorial Day weekend.
- In 1973, the race was scheduled for Memorial Day Monday. The change was made after requests from spectators, many complaining that it was inconvenient to the many people who had to work on Saturdays. In addition, it allowed the popular 500 Festival Parade to run downtown during the daytime, rather than as the night parade it had been forced to be for years. Despite the change, rain and accidents delayed the race until Wednesday.
- Since 1974, the race has been scheduled for the Sunday of Memorial Day weekend.
- In case of a rainout on Sunday, the race will be rescheduled for the following day, Monday – the Memorial Day federal holiday. Monday is the prioritized make-up date. However, if it rains again on Monday, the race will be shifted to the next available day.
- The 1986 race was scheduled for Sunday, May 25, but was rained out on both Sunday and Monday. It was postponed to the following weekend and held on Saturday, May 31.
- The 1997 race was scheduled for Sunday, May 25, but rain washed out the day. The race began the next day, on Memorial Day (Monday, May 26), but rain showers moved back into the area. The race was halted after 15 laps and could not be restarted. Short of the 101 laps needed for an official race, track officials elected to resume the race on the following day (Tuesday, May 27). The race was run to completion, as laps 16–200 were completed on Tuesday.
- The 2020 race was scheduled for Sunday, May 24, but due to the COVID-19 pandemic, was rescheduled for Sunday, August 23, in an attempt to allow spectators (which Marion County refused; spectators were eventually allowed for the third INDYCAR meeting at the Speedway, the Harvest Grand Prix in October 2020).

Armed Forces Day also falls during the month of May and usually coincides with one of the weekends of time trials. Since 1978 at the Speedway, that weekend is often filled with activities honoring the U.S. military, including an oath of enlistment ceremony.

=== Days and dates ===
Day	Total	Years
Sunday	51	1974, 1975, 1976, 1977, 1978, 1979, 1980, 1981, 1982, 1983, 1984, 1985, 1987, 1988, 1989, 1990, 1991, 1992, 1993, 1994, 1995, 1996, 1998, 1999, 2000, 2001, 2002, 2003, 2004, 2005, 2006, 2007, 2008, 2009, 2010, 2011, 2012, 2013, 2014, 2015, 2016, 2017, 2018, 2019, 2020, 2021, 2022, 2023, 2024, 2025, 2026
Monday	15	1915, 1920, 1921, 1926, 1927, 1932, 1937, 1938, 1948, 1949, 1954, 1955, 1960, 1965, 1966
Tuesday	8	1911, 1916, 1922, 1933, 1939, 1950, 1961, 1997
Wednesday	8	1923, 1934, 1940, 1951, 1956, 1962, 1967, 1973
Thursday	8	1912, 1928, 1929, 1935, 1946, 1957, 1963, 1968
Friday	8	1913, 1924, 1930, 1941, 1947, 1952, 1958, 1969
Saturday	12	1914, 1919, 1925, 1931, 1936, 1953, 1959, 1964, 1970, 1971, 1972, 1986
Date	Total	Years
May 24	7	1981, 1987, 1992, 1998, 2009, 2015, 2026
May 25	6	1975, 1980, 2003, 2008, 2014, 2025
May 26	8	1974, 1985, 1991, 1996, 2002, 2013, 2019, 2024
May 27	9	1972, 1979, 1984, 1990, 1997, 2001, 2007, 2012, 2018
May 28	7	1978, 1989, 1995, 2000, 2006, 2017, 2023
May 29	9	1971, 1977, 1983, 1988, 1994, 2005, 2011, 2016, 2022
May 30	54	1911, 1912, 1913, 1914, 1916, 1920, 1921, 1922, 1923, 1924, 1925, 1927, 1928, 1929, 1930, 1931, 1932, 1933, 1934, 1935, 1936, 1938, 1939, 1940, 1941, 1946, 1947, 1949, 1950, 1951, 1952, 1953, 1955, 1956, 1957, 1958, 1959, 1960, 1961, 1962, 1963, 1964, 1966, 1968, 1969, 1970, 1973, 1976, 1982, 1993, 1999, 2004, 2010, 2021
May 31	9	1915, 1919, 1926, 1937, 1948, 1954, 1965, 1967, 1986
August 23	1	2020

=== Practice and qualifying ===
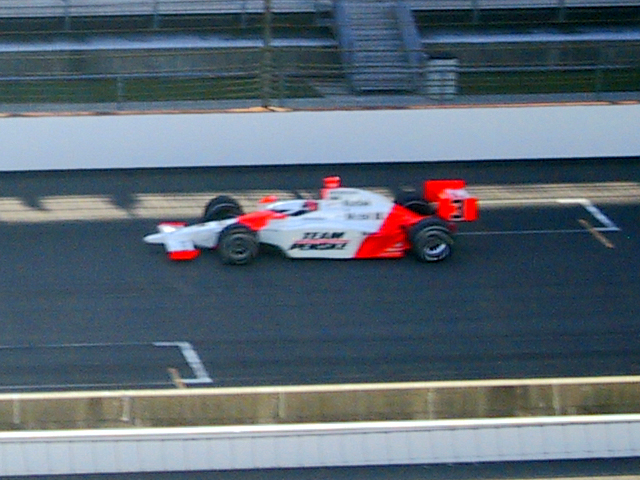
Hélio Castroneves makes his pole-winning qualification run in 2007 during "Happy Hour". Note the shadows cast on the racing surface.

==== Opening Day ====
The first day of practice is traditionally referred to as "Opening Day". From 1911 to 1973, Opening day was traditionally May 1, although oftentimes the track was made available for practice much earlier than that date. The day is usually marked with festivities and for many years was popularly attended. In some years when May 1 fell mid-week, or if weather interfered, the activity would be light and the formal ceremonies would be held on the first Saturday of the month. Since 1974, the "Opening Day" practice session has been scheduled either three weeks or two weeks prior to race day. The battle to be the First Driver on the Track for the month was a spectacle of Opening Day for many years. Teams and drivers would battle to get their cars prepped and cranked up as soon as officials opened the track, hoping to be the first car to leave the pits, and likewise the first car to complete a practice lap for the month. The effort usually attracted the attention of the smaller teams, as it was seen as a way to draw headlines for the day. The race to be first on the track was usually friendly, although in some years it became heated, drawing the ire of the officials. For a time, it became a tradition that the cars of the Bryant Heating & Cooling Team, and later Dick Simon Racing, were usually the first cars on the track. In recent years, Opening Day might include separate sessions for Rookie Orientation and Refresher tests, proceeding or following a full-field, veteran driver practice session. One of the long-standing traditions of Opening Day is the ceremonial handing over of the keys to the pace car from the manufacturer to the track officials.

==== Rookie Orientation Program ====
Starting in 1936 all rookies were required to take a rookie test prior to being allowed to compete. The test traditionally consists of multiple phases, each increasing in speed, under the close observation of officials, driver coaches, and both current and former IndyCar Series drivers. Rookie drivers are required to exhibit adequate car control and proper driving lines, among other requirements. After several decades of conducting the tests during normal session of practice (usually early in the month), officials decided to organize the sessions. Since 1981, the Rookie Orientation Program (ROP) has been held in April or early May. The program allows newcomers the opportunity to take their first laps at the Speedway and acclimate themselves to the circuit in a relaxed environment. It would be held without the pressure of veteran drivers crowding the track, without the distraction of spectators, and with minimal media coverage. Currently, drivers can complete all phases of their rookie tests during ROP if conditions allow. The ROP has traditionally been held prior to opening day, however, in some years it served as opening day. Drivers with exceptional driving experience at high levels of motorsports can occasionally receive waivers for participation in ROP, but must still pass their rookie test at a later date before they can practice during normal sessions.

==== Refresher Tests ====
In addition to Rookie Orientation Program, veteran Indy 500 drivers who have not been behind the wheel of a race car for a considerable amount of time, as determined by the officials, may be required to complete a refresher test prior to competing. Currently the "Refresher Test" consists of the final two phases of the aforementioned rookie test, and it is used to re-acclimate drivers to Indy car racing and the Speedway. Refresher test participants usually are drivers that have not driven in an Indy car, particularly on an oval superspeedway, since the previous year's Indy 500 (or longer). This usually applies to part-time drivers and drivers who have been away from the sport for an extended period of time. Full-time drivers in the IndyCar Series (that are not rookies) are almost universally exempt from taking refresher tests. Track time for refresher tests is usually offered during the Rookie Orientation Program, but they can also be completed on regular practice days unless they did not participate at Indianapolis or another superspeedway the previous year.

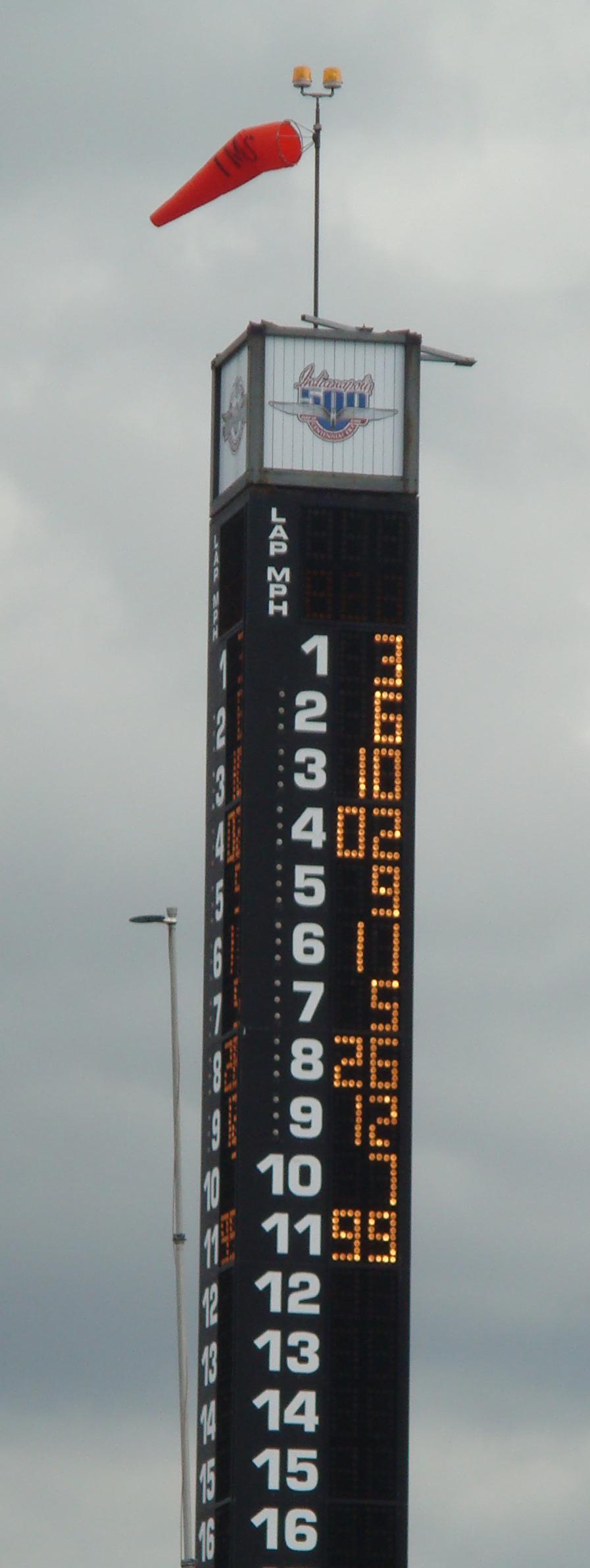
Scoring pylon at the close of pole day qualifications in 2009.

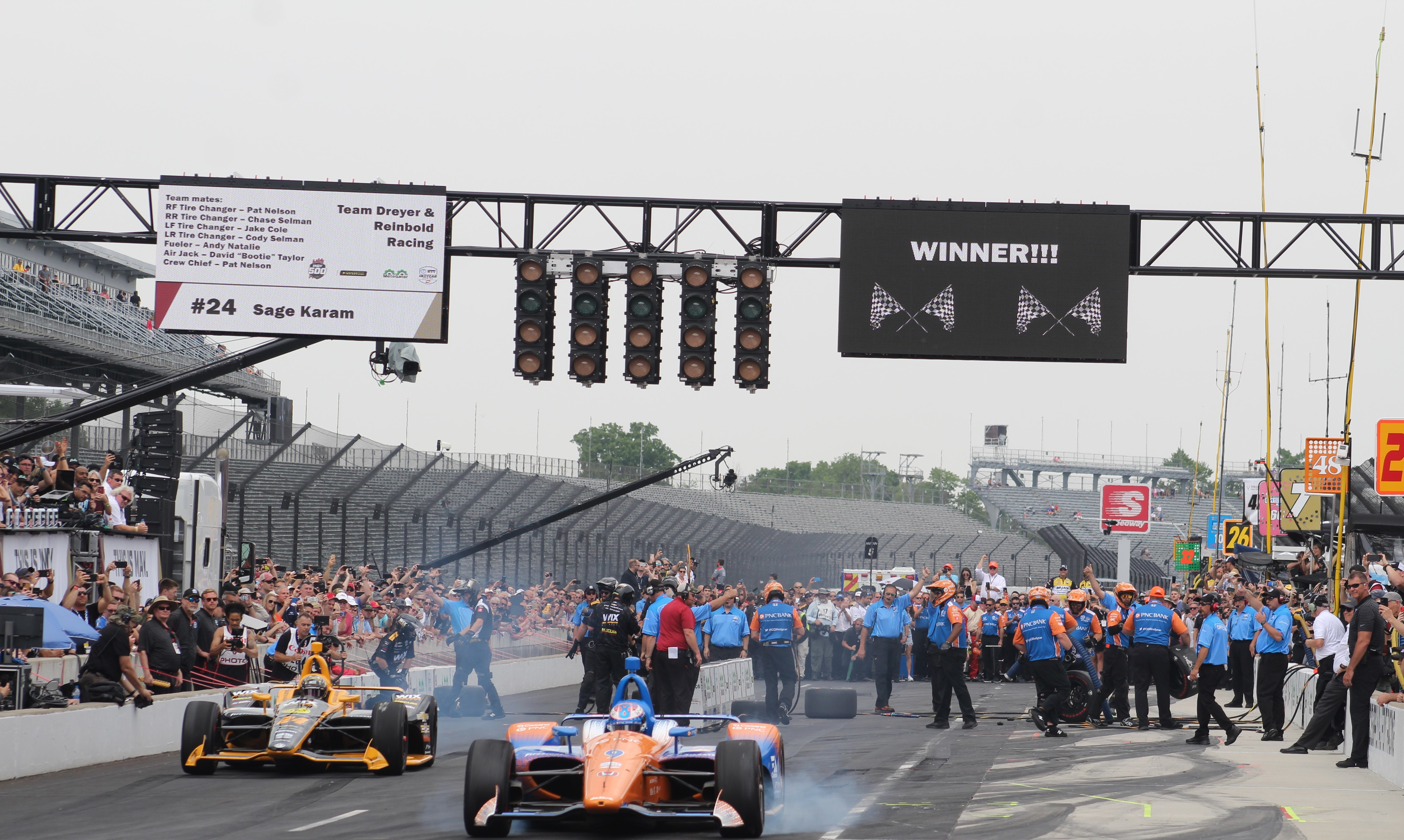
Scott Dixon goes up against Sage Karam during the Pit Stop Challenge at the 2019 Carb Day

==== Practice ====
Since the first Indianapolis 500 in 1911, the track has been opened for practice early in the month for competitors. Through 1973, it was a tradition that the track was made available for practice beginning on May 1. In some years the track opened as early as mid-April. In 1974, the schedule was cut back to three weeks prior to race day. Since 2010, the track typically opens for practice about two weeks before race day. In the early years, practice began each day as early as 9:00 a.m., but in modern times, the track typically opens at 11 a.m. or 12 p.m. Traditionally, the track closes at 6:00 p.m. During the USAC years, the 6 p.m. close was a hard deadline, but more recent years, if weather delays the start of practice on a particular day, IndyCar officials may extend the session beyond 6 p.m., to make up for some lost track time.

==== Happy Hour ====
The final hour of practice and qualifying each day is referred to as "Happy Hour". Due to the large double-deck grandstands on the front stretch, large shadows are cast over a good portion of the track, cooling the asphalt surface. A lower ambient air temperature, along with a lower track surface temperature, usually translates into faster speeds. Since Indiana began observing Daylight Saving Time in 2006, this phenomenon has been somewhat diminished. It is believed that former USAC midget racer Tommy Copp coined the term "Happy Hour" in the early-1960s.

==== Fast Friday ====
The final practice session before pole day qualifying is nicknamed "Fast Friday". The fastest speeds of the month are commonly observed on Fast Friday, as teams and drivers make their final preparations and look for final "bragging rights" before the run for the pole position. Since the current engine formula was adopted in 2012, elevated turbocharger "boost" levels have been permitted on Fast Friday, reflecting the increased level allowed during time trials. Drivers who have been "sandbagging" during the week may choose to reveal their speed, in an effort to distance themselves from the competition. Sometimes the speeds turned in on Fast Friday are overachieved by the respective drivers' due to a tow. Though "Fast Friday" has been a fixture since the 1950s–1960s, the nickname was not coined until about 1996. Track records set on Fast Friday (as well as other practice sessions) are considered unofficial. The sanctioning body only recognizes speeds set during the officially competitive sessions of qualifying and the race.

==== Pole Day ====
The first day of time trials traditionally was referred to as "Pole Day". The fastest qualifier on pole day wins the highly coveted pole position. Over the years, the "race for the pole" was often regarded as a race in itself, a speed contest, and was advertised as the second-largest single day sporting event (second only to race day itself). Though crowds have diminished for pole day as of late, and rules changes have curtailed speeds, the nickname "The Fastest Day in Motorsports" is still sometimes used. Since 2014, a special two-day format has been utilized for time trials, and the pole position is actually not determined until the conclusion of the second day. The term "pole day" is still widely used, however, to reference the second day in particular.

==== Bump Day ====
The final day of qualifying, when the final starting field is set, is traditionally known as "Bump Day" (or "Bubble Day"). Drivers who are removed from the starting grid of 33 by being out-qualified by faster cars are said to have been "bumped". The driver with the slowest speed in the field of 33, the first in line to be bumped, is said to be "on the bubble". Unqualified drivers attempt to bump their way into the field and "burst the slower driver's bubble". Prior to World War II, the term typically used for drivers being knocked out of the field was "crowded out". Since the early 2000s, smaller entry lists have led to fewer cars, or even zero cars, being bumped from the starting grid. With the adoption of a special two-day qualifying format in 2014, the bumping procedure from 2014 to 2018 actually would occur on the first day (Saturday) of time trials. As such, the term "Bump Day" disappeared from use for a few years. In 2018, the term "Bump Day" was brought back, and was used as the nickname for the first day of time trials. Beginning in 2019, the bumping procedure returns to the second day of time trials (Sunday).

==== Post-qualifying practice ====
Beginning in 2014, an additional practice session has been scheduled on the Monday after qualifying, and starting in 2019, after Pole Day qualifying, primarily for the cars starting 10-30 (which do not participate in any qualifying sessions during Bump session or the Pole session). After schedule overhauls, as well as a substantial format changes for qualifying, this session is utilized specifically for race practice, particularly multi-car "group" practice. This practice session has proven to be frenzied and aggressive, simulating race conditions. Previously teams would utilize weekdays, and very often, loosely utilize the down times of the final day of time trials for such practice. Due to the format changes of time trials, adequate time is no longer available to practice during down times on the last day of time trials due to the lengthy post-qualifying technical inspection, and the general lateness of the day that the starting grid is finalized. This extra practice period is also sometimes used by teams to reach maximum mileage for engines, as they install a fresh engine for Carb Day and race day. Under current INDYCAR rules, an engine must reach 2,550 miles (or 4,100 km) during the season in order to be eligible for a fresh engine.

==== Freedom 100 ====
The Indy Lights developmental support series (now called Indy NXT) began holding a support race, the Freedom 100, during the month of May in 2003. For the first two years, it was held on the second weekend of time trials. In 2005, it was moved to Carb Day. Practice and qualifying for the Freedom 100 is held at some point during the week (between Indy 500 time trials and Carb Day). The Freedom 100 was taken off the schedule in 2020, and it currently on hiatus.

==== Carb Day ====
The final practice session before the race, currently held on the Friday before race day, is called "Carburetion Day" (shortened to "Carb Day" since 2000). The name originally came from the fact that it was the final session where teams could tune their carburetors in conditions similar to those that might be encountered on race day. The name has remained despite the fact that no qualified car has used a carburetor since 1963. The day is now similar to most motorsport weekends, as the final practice is accompanied by a pit stop contest, a support race, and a concert. The Pit Stop Challenge debuted in 1977, the Indy Lights Freedom 100 moved to Carb Day in 2005, and the concerts have been held since 1998. In 1969–1972, Carb Day was held the Wednesday before the race. From 1973 to 2004, Carb Day was held the Thursday before the race. It was moved to Friday before the race beginning in 2005, at which time the Indy Lights race was moved to that day. Prior to 1969, Carb Day was not on a fixed day of the week, instead it was simply scheduled for a nondescript day midway between the final day of time trials and race day, and was sometimes closed to the public. Particularly with the advent of the sometimes aggressive Post-Qualifying Monday practice, the Carb Day practice session is typically disciplined and relatively tame. The objectives of the teams might be to conduct basic leak-checks, and/or other minute, last-minute adjustments, but refraining from aggressive driving and avoiding incidents. In case of inclement weather, the Carb Day practice is usually cancelled without being rescheduled.

In 2025–2026, Carb Day has hosted the Wienie 500, featuring a race between the six Oscar Mayer Wienermobiles.

=== Radio ===
Coverage of the Indianapolis 500 on radio dates back to 1922. The longtime flagship station of the IMS Radio Network is WIBC, which in 2007 moved from WFNI at 1070 AM to WIBC at 93.1 FM.

WFNI's AM signal went dark in August 2021, but continues to be heard in Indianapolis on FM translator 93.5 MHz, with programming fed by sister station WIBC 93.1 FM's HD Radio subchannel, which continues to originate its Sports radio format including the IMS Radio Network. The network dates back to 1952, and was initially launched using WIBC talent. Since the late 1960s and early 1970s, the station has featured extensive daily coverage of practice, qualifications, as well as pre-race and post-race coverage on race day.

From 1971 to 2020, the most popular and most traditional daily show during the month of May was Donald Davidson's The Talk of Gasoline Alley.

=== Concerts ===
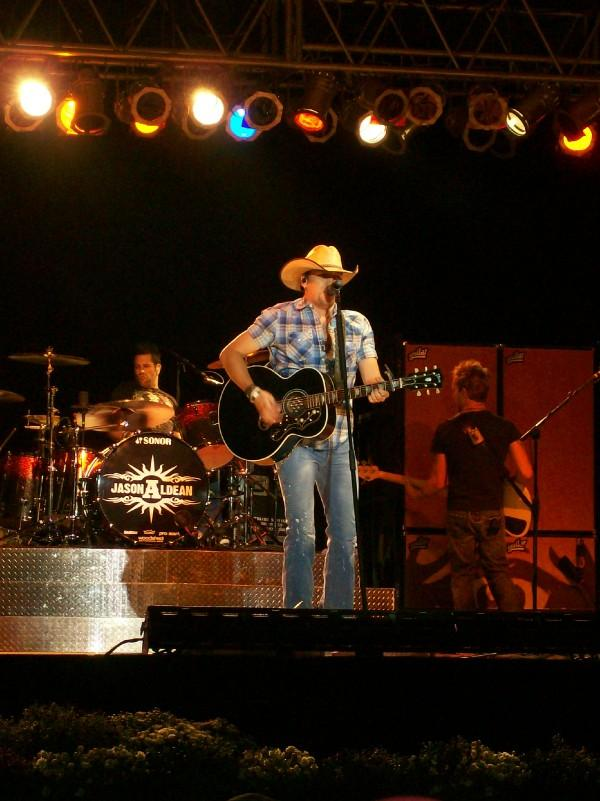
Jason Aldean

Since the early 1990s, concerts featuring top acts have been held the weekend of the race. Originally the concerts were held downtown the night of Carburetion Day, sponsored by local radio station WFBQ. In 1998, the Carb Day concert was moved to the track. Numerous other local bands, indie bands, garage bands, and smaller musical acts perform at other times during the month on days featuring track activity. Prior to 2005, Carb Day was the Thursday before the race, and since 2005, Carb Day has been the Friday prior to the race. Currently, the Carb Day concert is typically held in the afternoon, following the conclusion of on-track activity. Starting in 2014, a second headlining concert has been held on Legends Day. The Carb Day concert has typically featured rock groups, while Legends Day typically stars country music artists. The performers have been as follows:

Carb Day concerts

- 1992: Doug Lawson and the Middle of the Road Band (Wednesday), Carl Storie band (Friday)
- 1993: 38 Special (concert held downtown at Union Station)
- 1994: John Kay and Steppenwolf, Carl Storie and the Faith Band reunion, Bob & Tom Band (concert held downtown at Union Station)
- 1995: Alligator Brothers, Bob & Tom Band, The Electric Amish, The Marshall Tucker Band (concert held downtown at Union Station)
- 1996: Charlie Daniels Band (concert held downtown at Union Station)
- 1997: Bob & Tom Band, The Electric Amish, Larry Crane, Eddie Money (concert held downtown at Union Station)
- 1998: Tracy Byrd and Neal McCoy
- 1999: Lorrie Morgan and Sammy Kershaw
- 2000: Smash Mouth
- 2001: Collective Soul
- 2002: Better Than Ezra (Nine Days opened)
- 2003: Cracker (Kenny Bräck and the Subwoofers opened)
- 2004: Live (Kenny Bräck and the Subwoofers opened)
- 2005: The Black Crowes (22-20s opened)
- 2006: The B-52's and Third Eye Blind
- 2007: Kid Rock
- 2008: Stone Temple Pilots
- 2009: 3 Doors Down
- 2010: ZZ Top
- 2011: Staind and Papa Roach
- 2012: Lynyrd Skynyrd
- 2013: Poison
- 2014: Sammy Hagar and The Wabos, Sublime with Rome
- 2015: 38 Special, O.A.R., Jane's Addiction
- 2016: Journey
- 2017: Steve Miller Band, Barenaked Ladies
- 2018: Train, Blues Traveler
- 2019: Foreigner, Kool & the Gang
- 2020: Concert cancelled due to COVID-19 pandemic (scheduled to be REO Speedwagon and Styx)
- 2021: No concert scheduled due to COVID-19 pandemic
- 2022: Kings of Chaos, Rick Springfield
- 2023: Bryan Adams, Soul Asylum
- 2024: George Thorogood and the Destroyers, Gin Blossoms, Kid Quill
- 2025: The All-American Rejects, Bret Michaels
- 2026: Counting Crows, Switchfoot

Legends Day concerts

- 2014: Jason Aldean
- 2015: Florida Georgia Line, Thomas Rhett, Frankie Ballard
- 2016: Corey Cox, Chris Janson, Blake Shelton
- 2017: Keith Urban, Dustin Lynch, Clayton Anderson
- 2018: Sam Hunt, Canaan Smith, Filmore
- 2019: Zac Brown Band, Carly Pearce, Clayton Anderson
- 2020: Concert cancelled due to COVID-19 pandemic (scheduled to be Luke Bryan and Morgan Wallen
- 2021: No concert scheduled due to COVID-19 pandemic
- 2022: Dierks Bentley, Ashley McBryde, and Dillon Carmichael (concert held at TCU Amphitheater at White River State Park)
- 2023: Brad Paisley, Russell Dickerson, Jackson Dean (concert held at TCU Amphitheater at White River State Park)
- 2024: Riley Green, Zach Top, Tenille Townes (concert held at Everwise Amphitheater at White River State Park)
- 2025: Midland (concert held at Everwise Amphitheater at White River State Park)

July 4 concerts

- 2015: The Rolling Stones (Zip Code Tour), Rascal Flatts

Big Machine 400 concerts

- 2017: The Chainsmokers, Major Lazer
- 2018: Not held (weather)
- 2019: Florida Georgia Line
- 2020: Florida Georgia Line, Dustin Lynch, Riley Green

=== Last Row Party ===
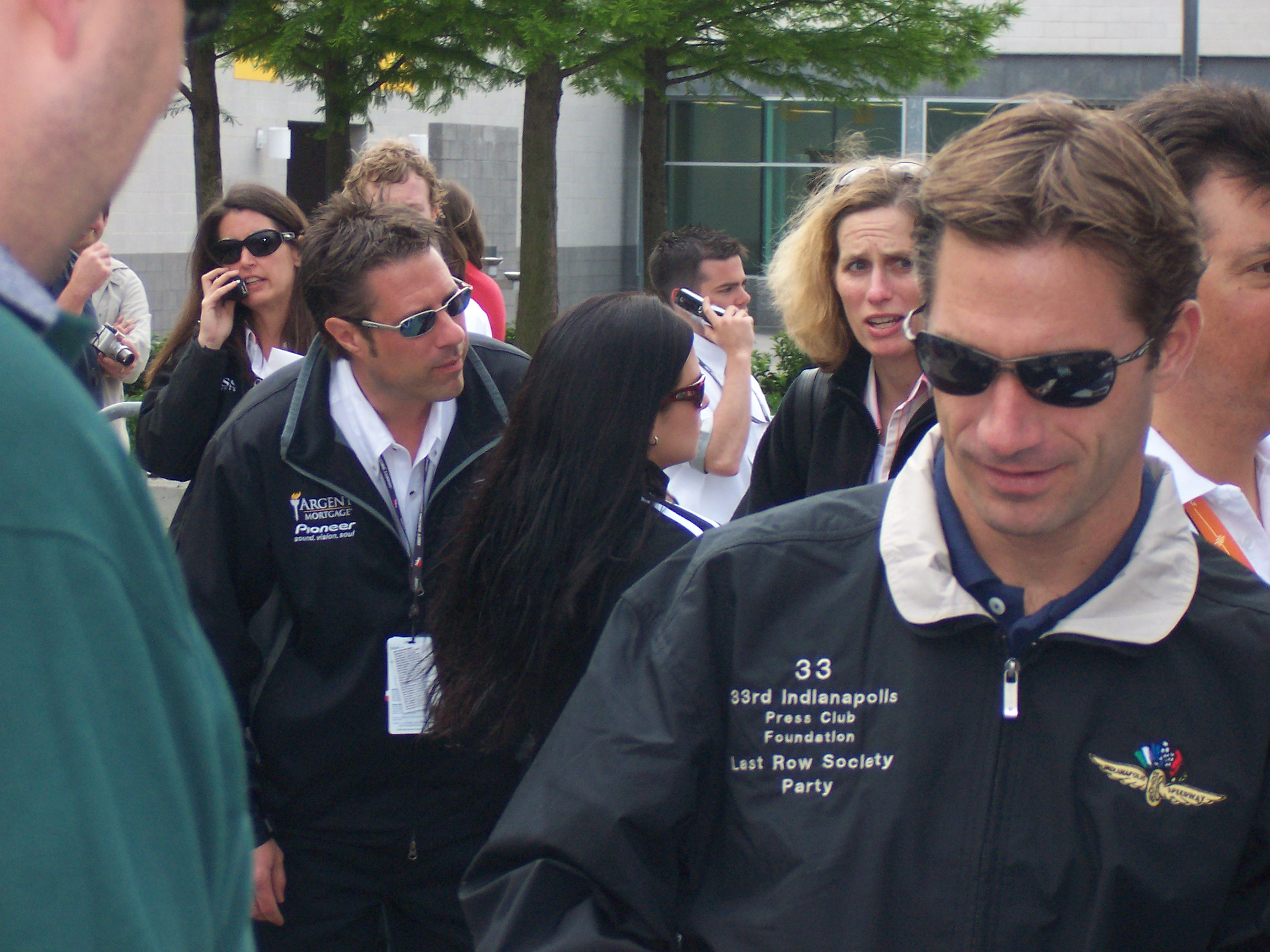
Driver Felipe Giaffone wearing his "Last Row Party" jacket at the 2005 race.

A few days before the race, the "Last Row Party" has been held for charity since 1973. It is a scholarship benefit organized by the Indianapolis Press Club Foundation, and is usually held the Thursday evening or Friday evening before the race. Currently it is held at one of the suites in the Pagoda, and previously it was held at the Speedway Motel. The event is conducted as a roast and cocktail party for the final three qualifiers in the 500, who will be starting on the eleventh and final row (positions 31, 32, and 33). Due to the complex qualifying procedure for the race, these three drivers are usually, but not always, the slowest three cars in the field. Like Mr. Irrelevant, often some of these drivers are obscure, and several have been race rookies. Some are noted for a dramatic last-minute qualifying effort to secure a spot in the lineup, while others may have survived a Bump day scare, or an otherwise tumultuous month of May, to hold on to make the field. Twelve former or eventual race winners have participated in the honor at some time during their career (Rutherford, Johncock, Sneva, Cheever, Lazier, Hunter-Reay, Kanaan, Sato, Power, Rossi, Ericsson, Newgarden).

In addition to being on the receiving end of numerous good-natured jokes and jabs, the three drivers are presented with a special jacket, various gifts, and checks for 31¢, 32¢, and 33¢, respectively. The group becomes known as the "11th Row Society" and enjoys a buffet dinner, apéritif, cocktails, and hors d'oeuvre with attendees. Later they may sign autographs and pose for pictures, in what is generally a fun and laid-back environment. The emcee for the event is usually a media figure, and past hosts included Bob Jenkins, Robin Miller, Jack Arute, Dave Wilson, and Laura Steele. The 2015 and 2016 co-emcees were Curt Cavin (Indianapolis Star) and Chris Hagen (WXIN). Lindy Thackston hosted the event for 2017 and 2018. The 2013 reception was not held but a brief ceremony was held on Carb Day to recognize the honorees.

"11th Row Society" honorees
Year	Starting position		
Year	31st	32nd	33rd
1973	(United States) Bob Harkey	(United States) Sammy Sessions	(United States) Jim McElreath
1974	(United States) Bob Harkey	(United States) Jan Opperman	(United States) Larry Cannon
1975	(United States) Mike Hiss	(Canada) Eldon Rasmussen	(United States) Tom Bigelow
1976	(United Kingdom) David Hobbs	(United States) Tom Bigelow	(United States) Jan Opperman
1977	(United States) John Mahler	(Canada) Eldon Rasmussen	(United States) Bubby Jones
1978	(United States) Gary Bettenhausen	(United States) Jerry Sneva	(United States) Mario Andretti
1979^{1}	(United States) Spike Gehlhausen	(United States) John Mahler	(Canada) Eldon Rasmussen
1980	(United States) Tom Bigelow	(United States) Gary Bettenhausen	(United States) Tom Sneva
1981^{2}	(United States) Tom Klausler	(United States) Jerry Karl	(United States) Mario Andretti
1982	(United States) Tom Bigelow	(United States) Pete Halsmer	(Mexico) Josele Garza
1983	(United States) Steve Krisiloff	(United States) Chet Fillip	(Australia) Dennis Firestone
1984^{3}	(United States) Johnny Rutherford	(United States) George Snider	(Australia) Dennis Firestone
1985	(Republic of Ireland) Derek Daly	(United States) Kevin Cogan	(United States) Rich Vogler
1986^{4}	(United States) Gary Bettenhausen	(United States) George Snider	(United States) Mario Andretti
1987^{5}	(United States) Ed Pimm	(United States) George Snider	(United States) Steve Chassey
1988	(Canada) Ludwig Heimrath	(United States) Rich Vogler	(United States) Howdy Holmes
1989	(United States) Davy Jones	(United States) Pancho Carter	(United States) Rich Vogler
1990	(United States) Bill Vukovich III	(United States) John Paul Jr.	(United States) Rocky Moran
1991	(United States) Randy Lewis	(United States) Pancho Carter	(United States) Gordon Johncock
1992^{6}	(United States) Tom Sneva	(United States) Gordon Johncock	(United States) Ted Prappas
1993	(United Kingdom) Jim Crawford	(Belgium) Didier Theys	(United States) Eddie Cheever
1994	(United States) Mike Groff	(Brazil) Marco Greco	(Canada) Scott Goodyear
1995^{7}	(United States) Scott Sharp	(Sweden) Stefan Johansson	(United States) Davy Jones
1996	(United States) Joe Gosek	(United States) Scott Harrington	(United States) Danny Ongais
1997^{8}	(Italy) Alessandro Zampedri	(Canada) Claude Bourbonnais	(United States) Paul Durant
1998	(France) Stéphan Grégoire	(United States) Mike Groff	(United States) Billy Roe
1999	(United States) Dr. Jack Miller	(United States) Robbie Buhl	(Brazil) Raul Boesel
2000	(United States) Billy Boat	(United States) Lyn St. James	(United States) Andy Hillenburg
2001	(United States) Cory Witherill	(United States) Billy Boat	(Brazil) Felipe Giaffone
2002	(United States) Greg Ray	(United States) George Mack	(United States) Mark Dismore
2003	(United States) Robby McGehee	(United States) Jimmy Kite	(Brazil) Airton Daré
2004	(United States) P. J. Jones	(Canada) Marty Roth	(United States) Robby McGehee
2005	(United States) Jeff Ward	(United States) Jimmy Kite	(Brazil) Felipe Giaffone
2006	(Netherlands) Arie Luyendyk Jr.	(United States) P. J. Jones	(Brazil) Thiago Medeiros
2007	(Brazil) Roberto Moreno	(United States) Richie Hearn	(United States) Phil Giebler
2008	(United States) A. J. Foyt IV	(United States) Buddy Lazier	(Canada) Marty Roth
2009	(France) Nelson Philippe	(United States) Ryan Hunter-Reay	(Canada) Alex Tagliani
2010	(Japan) Takuma Sato	(Colombia) Sebastián Saavedra	(Brazil) Tony Kanaan
2011	(United Kingdom) Pippa Mann	(Brazil) Ana Beatriz	(United States) Ryan Hunter-Reay
2012	(United States) Bryan Clauson	(Switzerland) Simona de Silvestro	(France) Jean Alesi
2013	(United States) Conor Daly	(United States) Buddy Lazier	(United Kingdom) Katherine Legge
2014	(United States) Sage Karam	(Colombia) Sebastián Saavedra	(United States) Buddy Lazier
2015	(Australia) Ryan Briscoe	(France) Tristan Vautier	(Australia) James Davison
2016	(United Kingdom) Jack Hawksworth	(United States) Buddy Lazier	(Canada) Alex Tagliani
2017	(Colombia) Sebastián Saavedra	(United States) Zach Veach	(Australia) James Davison
2018	(United Kingdom) Jack Harvey	(United States) Alexander Rossi	(United States) Conor Daly
2019	(United States) Sage Karam	(Canada) James Hinchcliffe	(United States) Kyle Kaiser
2020^{9}	(United States) Sage Karam	(United States) J. R. Hildebrand	(United Kingdom) Ben Hanley
2021^{9}	(United States) Sage Karam	(Australia) Will Power	(Switzerland) Simona de Silvestro
2022	(Denmark) Christian Lundgaard	(United Kingdom) Jack Harvey	(United Kingdom) Stefan Wilson
2023^{10}	(Denmark) Christian Lundgaard	(United States) Sting Ray Robb	(United Kingdom) Jack Harvey
2024	(United Kingdom) Katherine Legge	(Sweden) Marcus Ericsson	(United States) Graham Rahal
2025^{11}	(Netherlands) Rinus VeeKay	(United States) Josef Newgarden	(Australia) Will Power
2026^{12}	(United States) Sting Ray Robb	(Brazil) Caio Collet	(United Kingdom) Jack Harvey

- ^{1} The 1979 race had 35 starters. The party was still held in honor of those drivers on the 11th row despite a 12th row existing for the race.
- ^{2} Following the Last Row Party in 1981, Tim Richmond purchased the car of George Snider and was moved to 33rd on the grid. As the move occurred after the party occurred, Richmond was not honored as an 11th row society member, while Tom Klausler, who moved up to the 10th row, remained an honoree.
- ^{3} Chris Kneifel started in last, but was not an honoree. Kneifel had initially failed to qualify, but was instated into the field after Jacques Villeneuve was forced to withdraw his car after a practice accident.
- ^{4} A multi-car accident on Carb Day caused a significant reshuffle on the qualifying grid. Snider was moved behind Andretti, and two other drivers started behind the honorees.
- ^{5} Emerson Fittipaldi started the race last after switching to a back-up car due to a practice crash.
- ^{6} Scott Goodyear started last, but was not a Last Row Party honoree. Goodyear had failed to qualify but replaced Mike Groff, whose car was then moved to the rear of the field.
- ^{7} Bryan Herta started last the race last after switching to a back-up car due to a practice crash.
- ^{8} Race had 35 starters. The party was still held in honor of those drivers on the 11th row despite a 12th row existing for the race.
- ^{9} Ceremony cancelled due to the COVID-19 pandemic.
- ^{10} Graham Rahal started the race last after filling in as an injury replacement for Stefan Wilson. Rahal was also honored as a fourth member of the 11th Row Society along with the drivers that originally qualified on that row.
- ^{11} Prior to participating in Fast 12 qualifying on May 18, Josef Newgarden and Will Power withdrew their cars for failing tech inspections due to illegal modifications of their safety attenuators. On May 19, and notably after Jacob Abel was bumped from the starting grid in Last Chance Qualifying, Newgarden and Power were penalized for these modifications and were ordered to start 32nd and 33rd, respectively. Scott McLaughlin, the third Team Penske entry, did not have these modifications to his attenuator, and maintained his starting position of 10th.
- ^{12} Caio Collet and Jack Harvey were moved to the rear of the field due to technical infractions found during post-qualifying inspection.

=== Public drivers' meeting and Legends Day ===
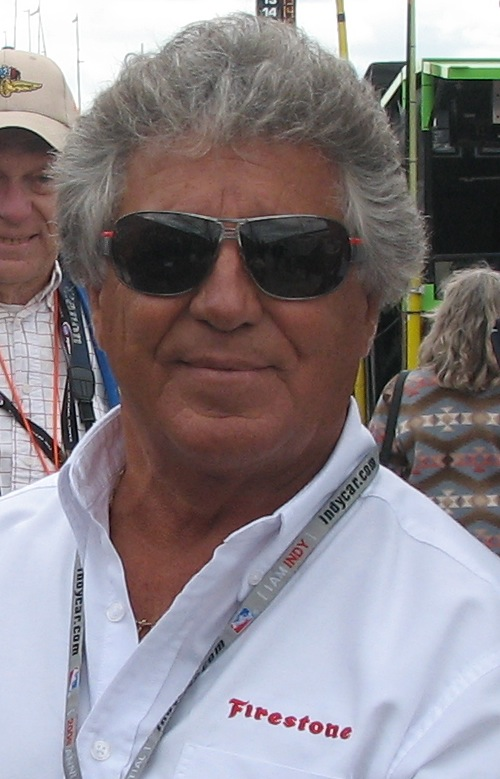
2014 Legends Day honoree Mario Andretti

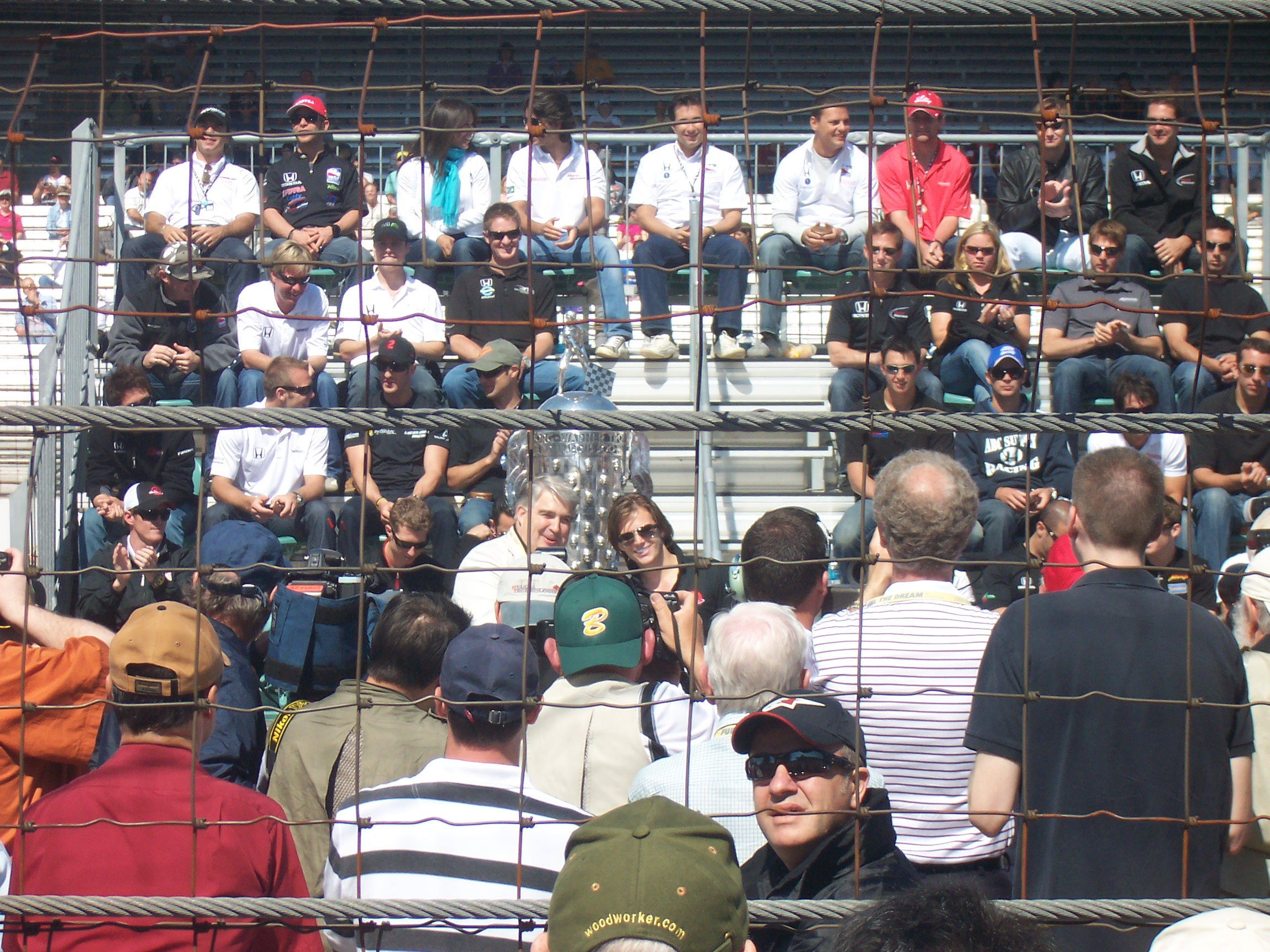
2008 drivers' meeting

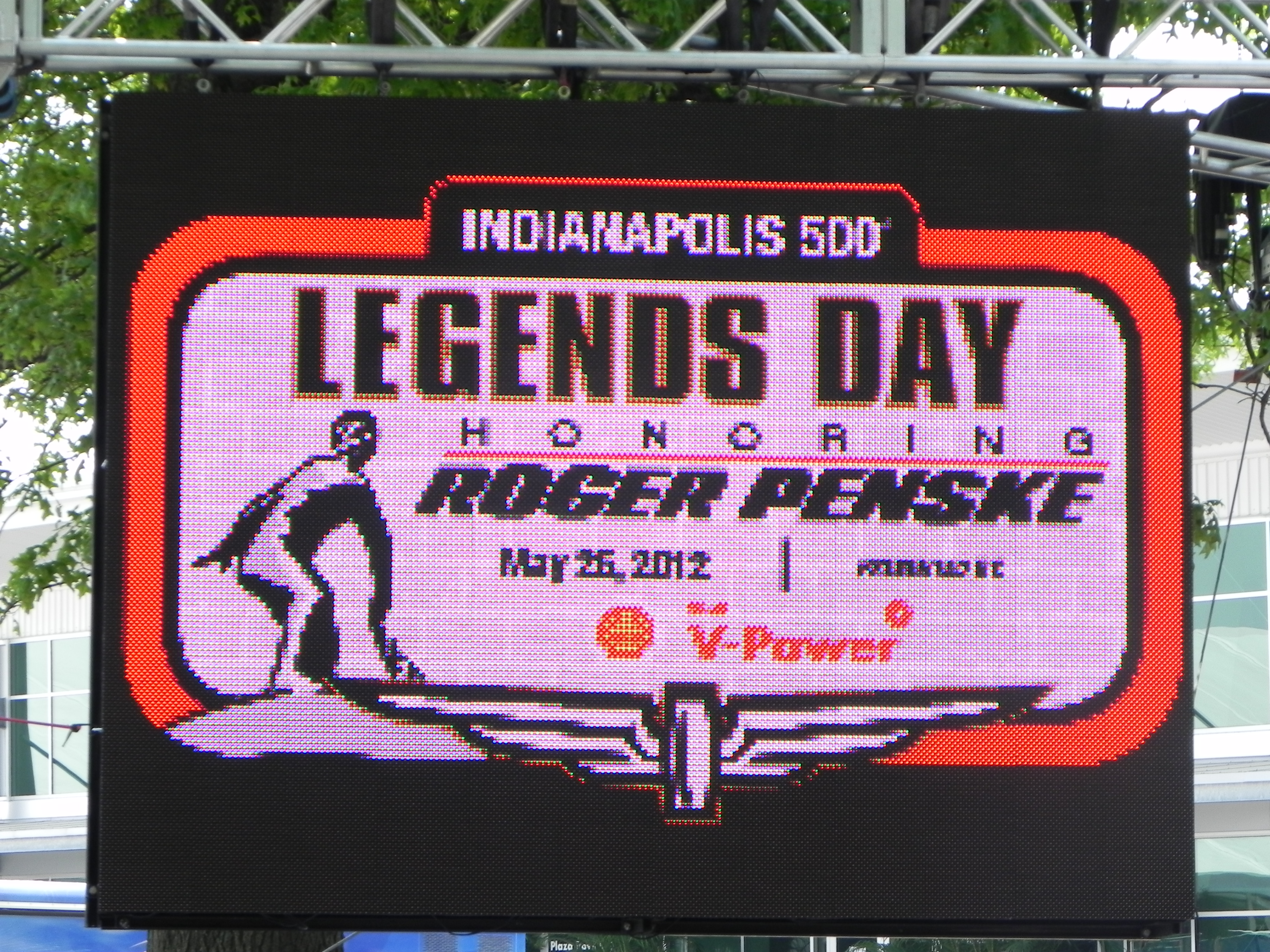
Legends Day in 2012

The day before the race, a ceremonial drivers meeting is held at the track, which is open to the public, and is popularly attended. This tradition dates back many decades. During the meeting, the 33 starting drivers are presented with their starter's ring and various awards and trophies are handed out (such as trophies from the previous year's race, qualifying awards, lifetime achievement awards, etc.) The drivers are usually seated on a platform situated in the eleven rows of three, and numerous other celebrities and special guests may be honored or give remarks. Rules clarifications, instructions for the race, and other pertinent information is also discussed in the open forum. Drivers who can not attend due to scheduling conflicts (e.g., participating in another race) will usually have another team member or family member participate on their behalf.

This drivers meeting is separate from the official drivers meeting, organized by race stewards. That meeting, held the morning of the race, is strictly closed to the public and the media.

Starting in 1998, the days leading up to the race have included ceremonies and activities honoring former drivers. In some years, each day during the week would have a featured Indy legend, and might feature the driver taking ceremonial laps around the track in one of his winning race cars, or in a pace car. Other years utilized Opening Day as an opportunity to honor Indy legends. In addition, the day before the race was expanded to include an autograph session featuring the 33 starting drivers, former drivers, Q&A sessions, car displays, a "fanfest" midway, a memorabilia show, and other festivities. Starting 2011, the events of the day before the race have been officially themed "Legends Day," and features a designated honoree. In addition, Legends Day showcases the classic cars of the 500: fans are able to get close looks and take photos of the machines, with a number of historic race cars also running laps of the circuit.

Legends Day honorees

- 1998: "Parade of Champions" (Parnelli Jones, Bobby Unser, Gordon Johncock, Johnny Rutherford, Al Unser, Tom Sneva)
- 1999: "Legends of the Speedway" (Rodger Ward, A. J. Watson, Johnny Rutherford, Jim Rathmann, Lloyd Ruby)
- 2000: "Legends of the Speedway" (Joe Leonard, Duke Nalon, Emerson Fittipaldi, Rick Mears, Mario Andretti, Andy Granatelli)
- 2001: "Salute to cars" (Indy 500 winning cars from 1911, 1922, 1931, 1951, 1961, and the 1968 Wedge Turbine)
- 2003: "Back-to-Back Winners" (Wilbur Shaw, Mauri Rose, Bill Vukovich, Al Unser, Hélio Castroneves)
- 2006: "Andretti Opening Day" (Mario, Michael, and Marco celebrating three generations of the Andretti family at Indy)
- 2007: "A. J. Foyt Opening Day" (Celebrating 50th year of A. J. Foyt participating at Indianapolis).
- 2008: "Unser Opening Day" (Al Sr., Al Jr., Robby, Johnny, and Al III, celebrating the Unser family at Indy)
- 2011: "Legends Day" with A. J. Foyt
- 2012: "Legends Day" with Roger Penske
- 2013: "Legends Day" with Parnelli Jones
- 2014: "Legends Day" with Mario Andretti
- 2015: "Legends Day" with Al Unser Sr.
- 2016: "Legends Day" Honoring Champions of the 500
- 2017: "Legends Day" Honoring Rookie Winners of the 500
- 2018: "Legends Day" Honoring the Roadster Era
- 2019: "Legends Day" celebrating the 1960s
- 2020: Cancelled due to COVID-19 pandemic (was to celebrate milestone events of 1920, 1965, 1970, 1980, 2005 IMS To Celebrate Indy 500 History, Heroes Leading into Firestone Legends Day)
- 2021: Not scheduled due to COVID-19 protocols

=== 500 Festival Parade ===
The 500 Festival is a non-profit organization founded in 1957 to organize various civic events in the city of Indianapolis leading up to the race. The festival includes more than 50 events and programs celebrating the Indianapolis 500, including its two largest events, the OneAmerica 500 Festival Mini-Marathon in early-May and the 500 Festival Parade the day before the race. Other events have included "Community Day" at the track, memorial services, luncheons, and the annual Snake Pit Ball, a black tie socialite gathering downtown. The 500 Festival attracts an annual attendance of about 500,000.

In many years, the parade grand marshal has been a celebrity with ties to Indiana or the Indianapolis area, particularly Indianapolis-area sports figures. In many cases, the grand marshal of the parade is also honored during pre-race festivities on race morning. The organizing committee boasts the parade as one of the largest in the nation. In 1997, a fire swept through the storage hangar housing the floats for that year's parade, threatening to cancel the event. Only four floats were spared, and Buddy Lazier's 1996 winning car escaped the fire only because the museum had decided to wait a few extra days before delivering it to the float staging area. The parade went on as scheduled but in a slightly retooled format.

The grand marshals for the annual parade have been as follows:

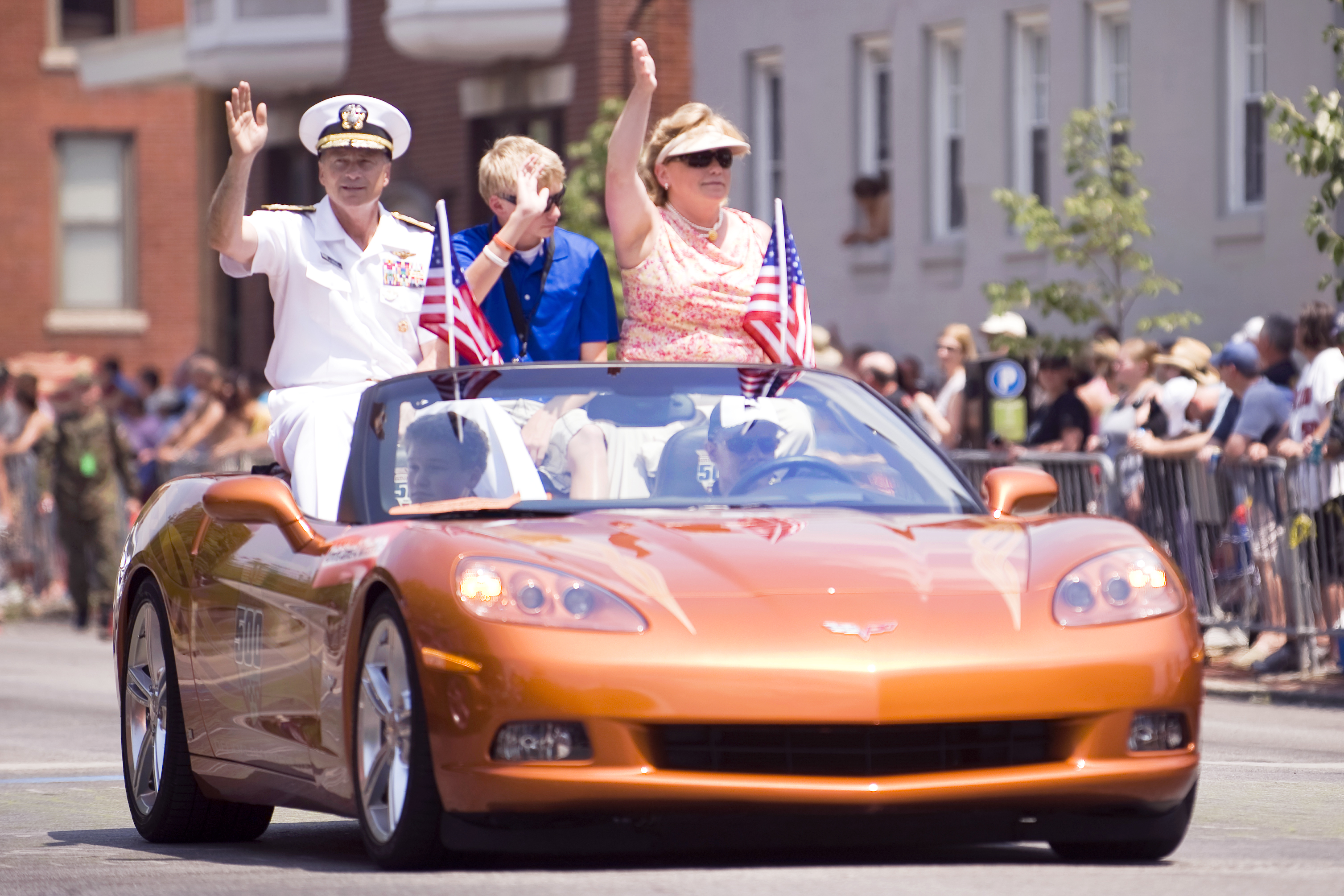
Navy Adm. James A. Winnefeld Jr. at the 2012 500 Festival Parade.

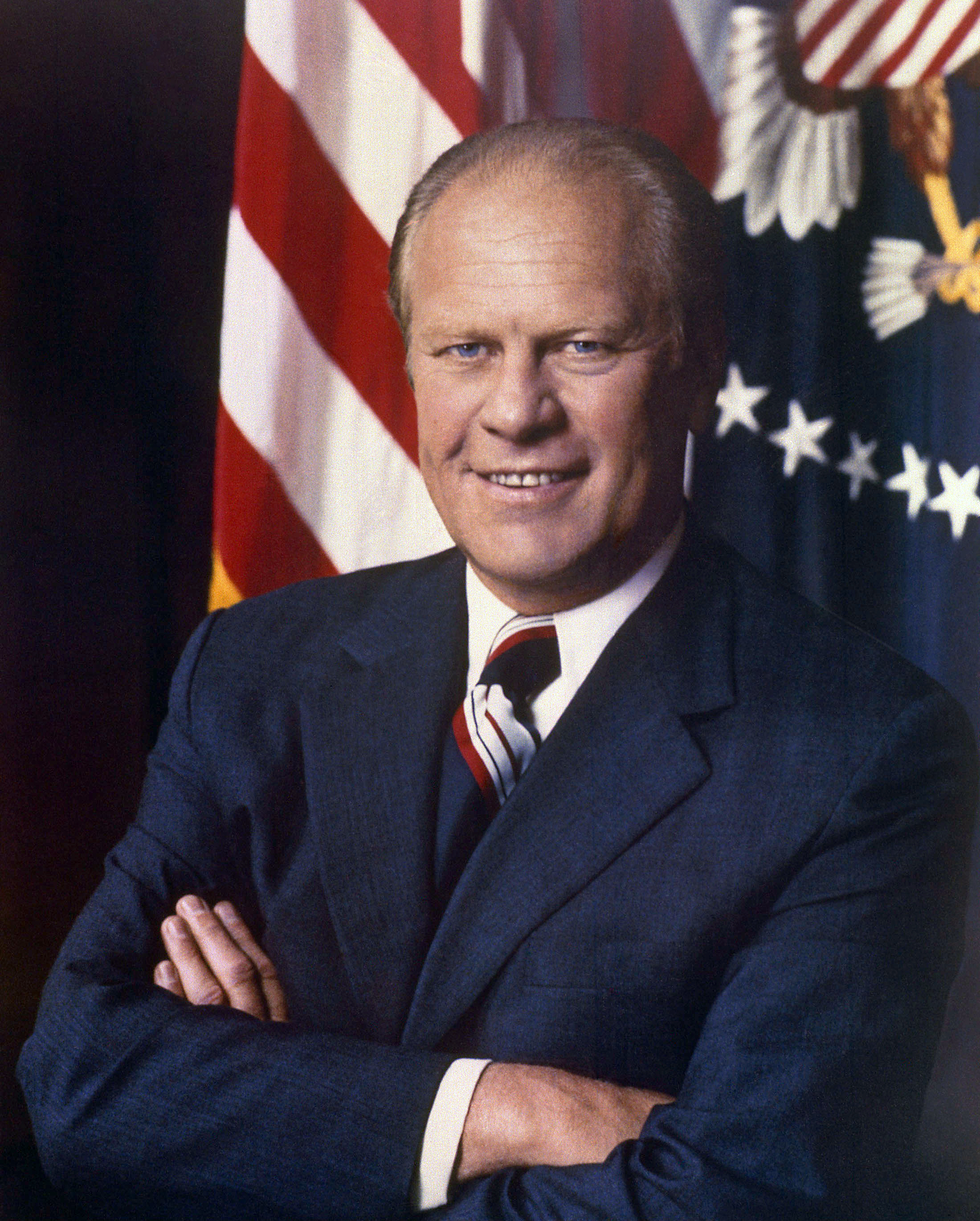
Former President Gerald Ford was the grand marshal in 1979.

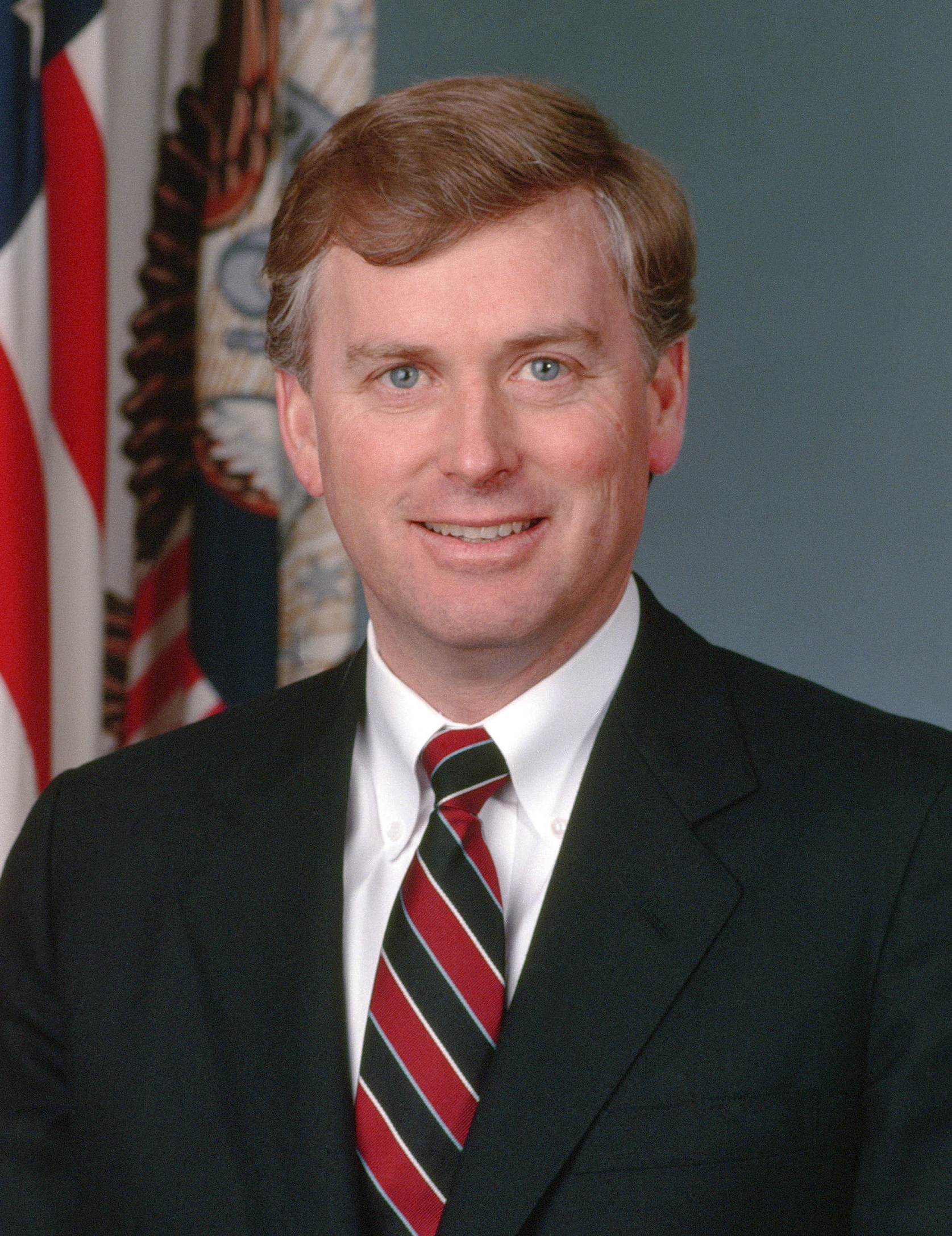
Vice-president Dan Quayle was the grand marshal in 1990.

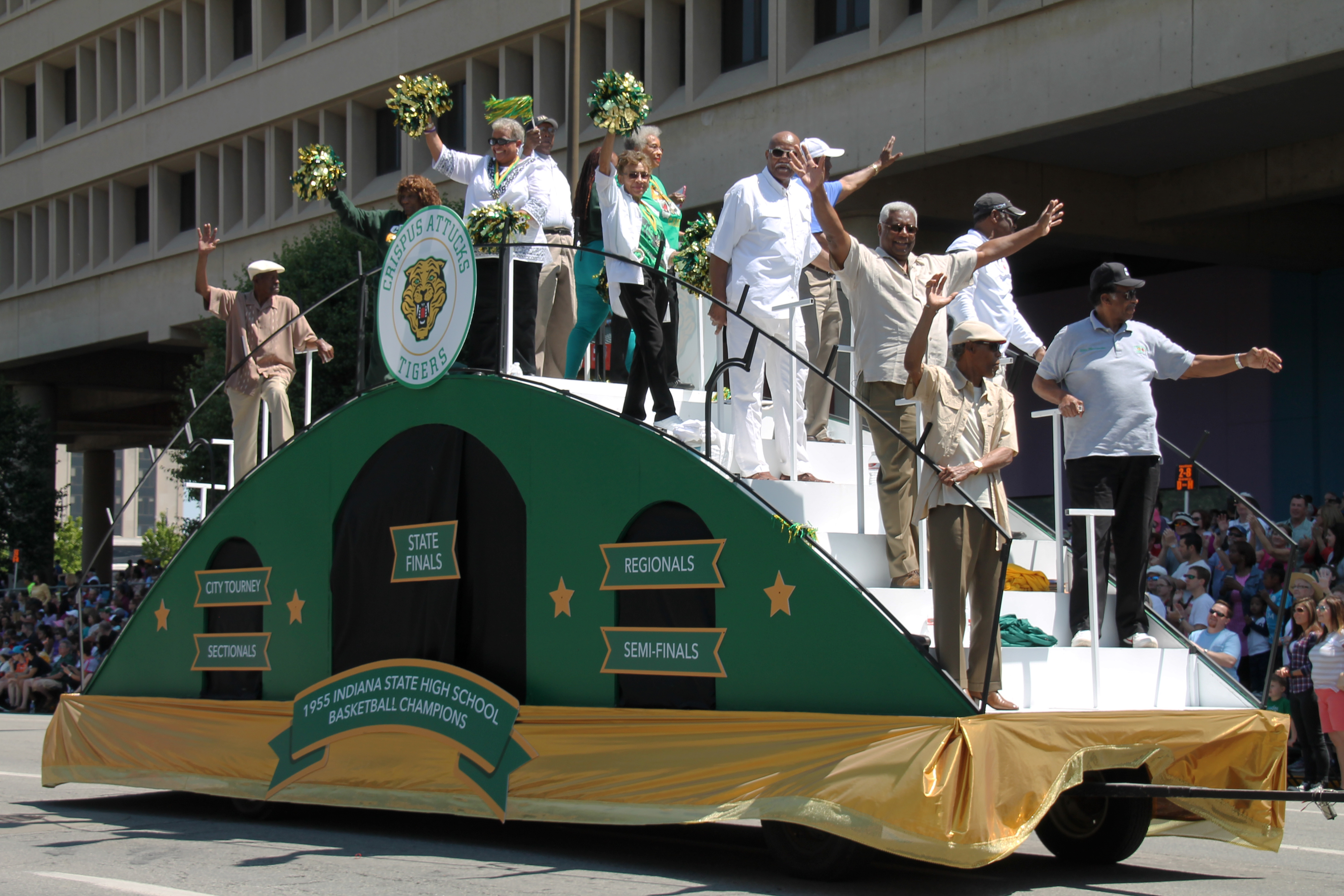
The 1955 Crispus Attucks High School State Champion Basketball Team were the grand marshals in 2015.

- 1957: Lt. Gen. G. W. Arnold
- 1958: Shirley MacLaine
- 1959
- 1960: Gen. David M. Shoup, Indiana native, Medal of Honor recipient, 22nd USMC Commandant
- 1961: Lt. Gen. Joe W. Kelly, Indiana native, DFC recipient, 5th MATS Commander
- 1962: Gen. Herbert B. Powell
- 1963: Lt. Gen. Charles G. Dodge, Commanding General 5th U.S. Army, Ft Sheridan, Illinois
- 1964: Lt. Gen. David A. Burchinal
- 1965: James Stewart
- 1966: Walter Cronkite
- 1967: Lorne Greene, Dan Blocker, Michael Landon
- 1968: Ambassadors from Peru, Bolivia, and Ecuador
- 1969: Manuel Fraga Iribarne
- 1970: Edie Adams
- 1971: George W. Romney, John Arthur Love, Carl Stokes
- 1972: Phil Harris
- 1973: James H. Kasler
- 1974: Mickey Mouse
- 1975: Peter DePaolo, 1925 Indianapolis 500 winner (driver); 1935 Indianapolis 500 winner (team owner)
- 1976: Tony Hulman & Bob Hope
- 1977: William Hanna & Joseph Barbera
- 1978: Roy Clark
- 1979: Gerald Ford (occurred after his presidency)
- 1980: Mike Douglas
- 1981: Joyce DeWitt (grew up in Speedway, Indiana, graduated from Speedway Senior High School)
- 1982: Merlin Olsen
- 1983: Joseph P. Allen (Crawfordsville, Indiana native)
- 1984: David Hasselhoff
- 1985: Mickey Mouse
- 1986: Jerry L. Ross
- 1987: Mario Vázquez Raña
- 1988: Jim Davis and Garfield (Davis is a native and lifelong resident of Indiana)
- 1989: Gene Autry
- 1990: Dan Quayle (then sitting Vice President of the United States, an Indiana native)
- 1991: A. J. Foyt and Mary Fendrich Hulman (Foyt was planning to retire after the 1991 race, but recanted and actually retired following the 1992 Indianapolis 500); General Norman Schwarzkopf was designated the grand marshal of the race itself.
- 1992: Mickey & Minnie Mouse
- 1993: Larry Bird (Indiana native)
- 1994: Mario Andretti and Bonnie Blair (Andretti was retiring at the end of the 1994 PPG Indy Car World Series, and 1994 would be his final Indy 500)
- 1995: A. J. Foyt, Rick Mears, Al Unser Sr. (the three four-time Indy 500 winners at the time)
- 1996: Jim Davis & Garfield
- 1997: Cam Cameron, Bob Davie, Joe Tiller (at the time the head coaches of the state's three Division I-A college football programs)
- 1998: David Wolf (Indianapolis native)
- 1999: Medal of Honor Recipients
- 2000: Jim Nabors
- 2001: Five Public Safety Agencies of Indianapolis
- 2002: Jim Caviezel
- 2003: Wynonna Judd
- 2004: Jane Pauley (Indianapolis native)
- 2005: Reggie Miller (who retired from the NBA following an 18-year career, spent entirely with the Indiana Pacers, days before the parade)
- 2006: Lance Armstrong (occurred before his 2012 doping scandal)
- 2007: Peyton Manning (won Super Bowl XLI MVP with Indianapolis Colts earlier in the year)
- 2008: Patricia Heaton
- 2009: Dick Vitale
- 2010: 2009–10 Butler Bulldogs men's basketball team (finished runner-up in NCAA tournament that season)
- 2011: Anderson Cooper
- 2012: Olivia Newton-John
- 2013: Indiana Fever (won WNBA championship in 2012)
- 2014: Josh Kaufman and Jim Nabors (celebrating Nabors' final 500 performance of "Back Home Again in Indiana")
- 2015: Members of 1955 Crispus Attucks High School State Champion basketball team and cheerleaders
- 2016: Emma Stumpf
- 2017: Eva Mozes Kor
- 2018: Abby Abel & Mitch Bonar (celebrating Champions Together; Special Olympics Unified Sports)
- 2019: Sam Schmidt
- 2020: Parade cancelled due to COVID-19 pandemic
- 2021: Parade not held due to COVID-19 pandemic
- 2022: August A. Ebeling (longtime Festival volunteer)
- 2023: Frank Shorter
- 2024: Tamika Catchings
- 2025: Scot Pollard

== Track lore ==
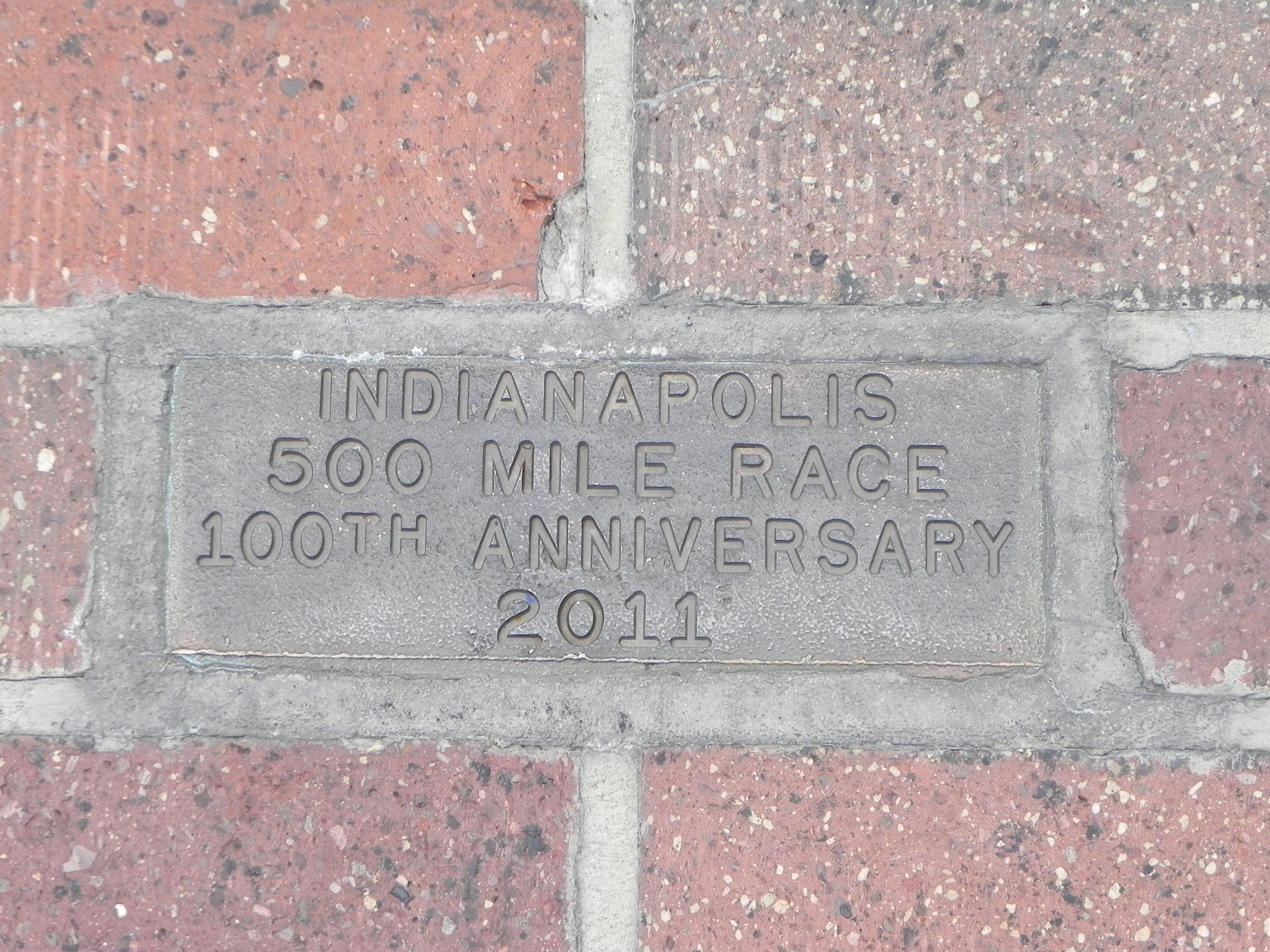
A ceremonial golden brick was installed at the start/finish line of the track to commemorate the 100th anniversary

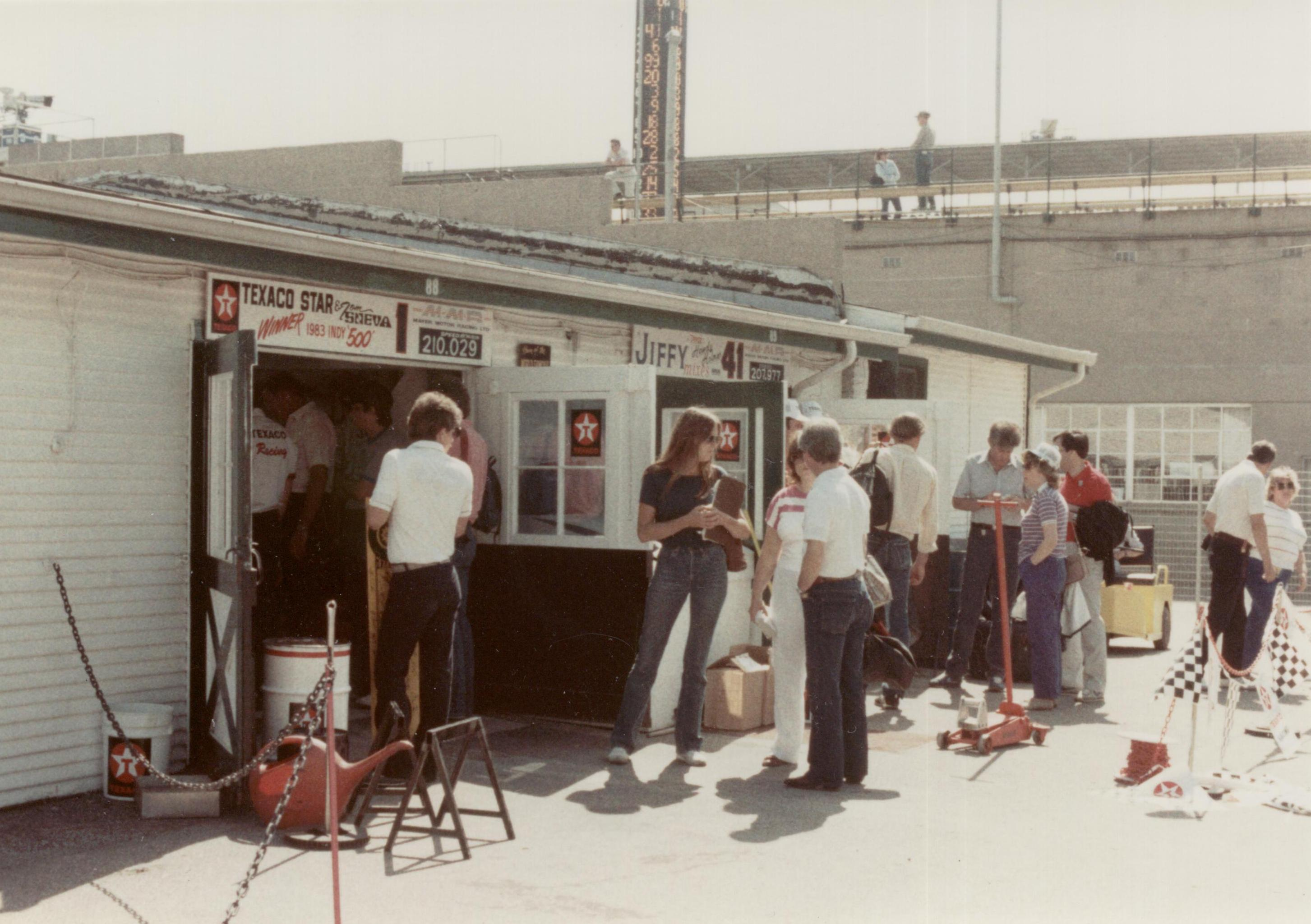
Gasoline Alley in 1984.

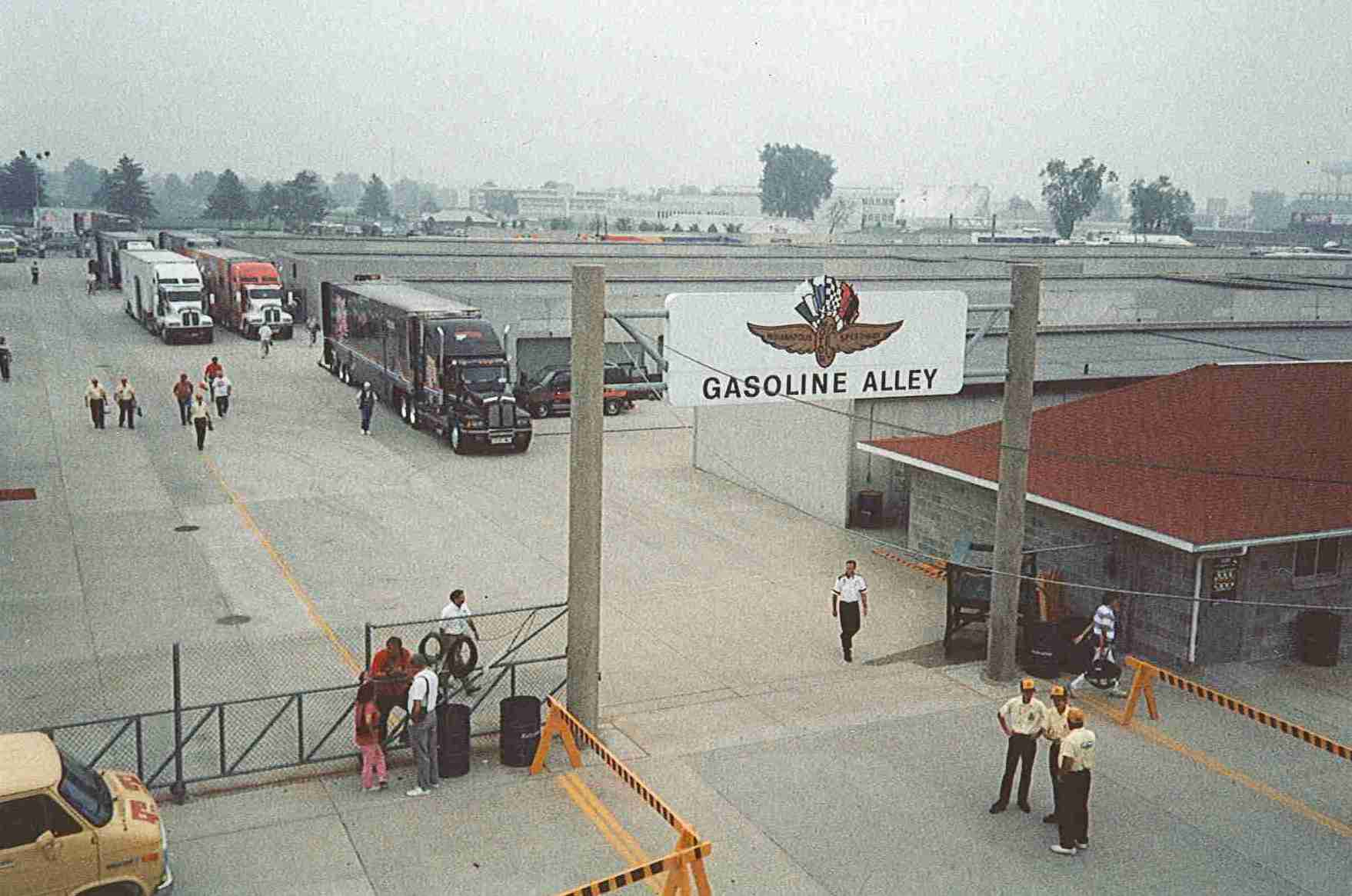
The new Gasoline Alley opened in 1986.

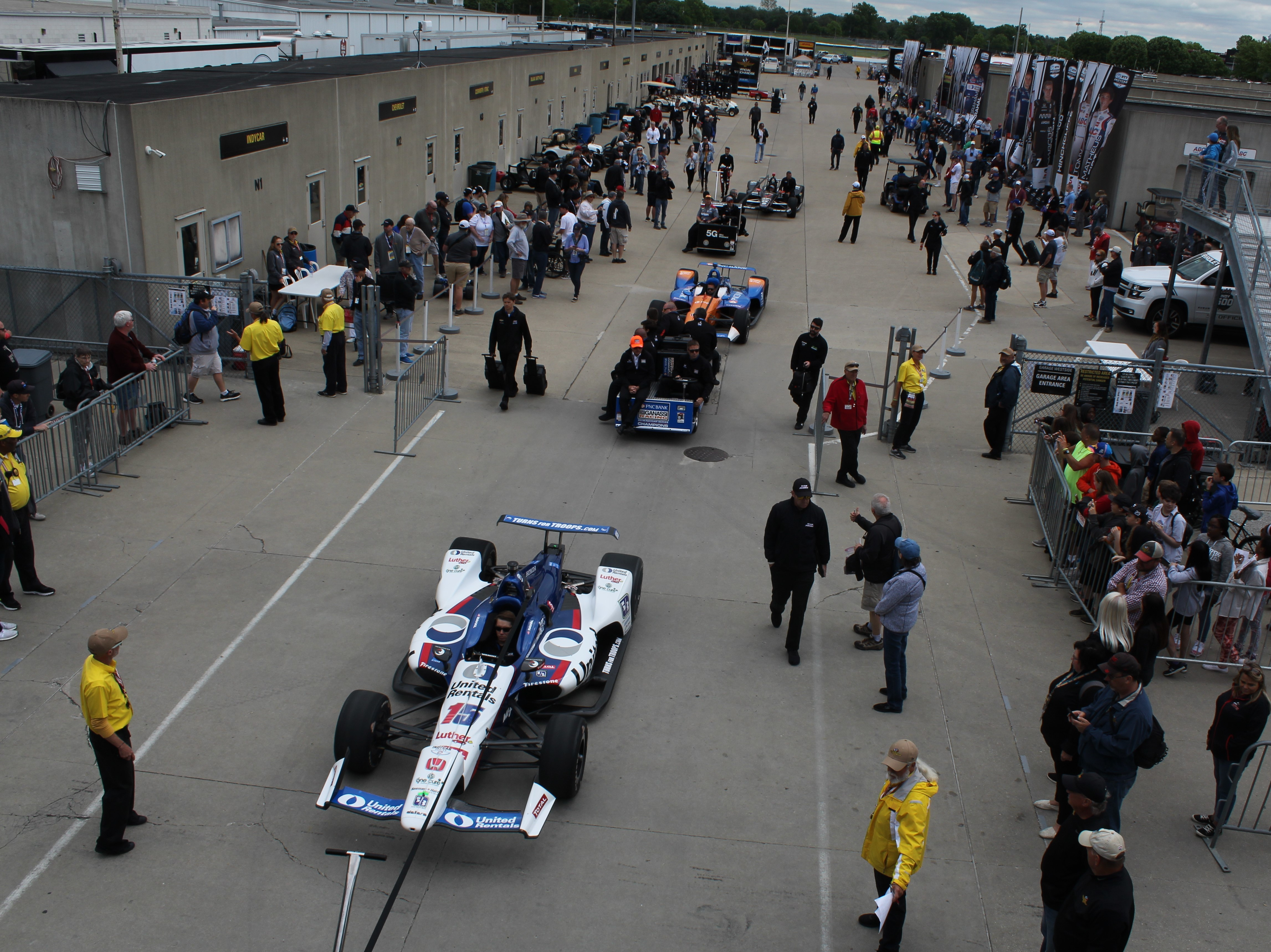
Gasoline Alley in 2019.

The atmosphere at the track during the month of May and on race day has long been a source of traditions.

=== The Brickyard ===
The nickname of the Indianapolis Motor Speedway is the "Brickyard". When the track opened in August 1909, the surface was composed of crushed stone and tar. This surface quickly was deemed unsuitable and dangerous after multiple accidents. In the fall of 1909, the track was paved in brick. In just over two months, 3.2 million bricks were hand laid on a bed of sand and the gaps were filled with mortar. Before the work was completed, locals nicknamed the track the "Brickyard". Beginning in the 1930s, portions of the track were paved over in asphalt, starting with the turns. By the late 1950s, most of the track had been paved over with asphalt. Only a portion of the maintretch remained brick.

Following the 1961 race, the remaining brick segment of the mainstretch was paved over, and the entire track was now covered in asphalt. One yard of bricks was left exposed at the start/finish line. To this day, the vast majority of the original 3.2 million bricks remain in place, buried several inches beneath multiple layers of asphalt. Some bricks have been unearthed from the track over the years, namely in the locations where the infield access tunnels have been constructed. Subsequent re-pavings of the track in 1976, 1988, 1995, and 2004, have preserved the bricks in place underneath. However, the yard of bricks exposed at the start/finish line has been dug up in those instances by milling operations. Different bricks - ostensibly bricks that were dug up at one point from other locations of the track - were cleanly re-laid at the start/finish line, both for safety and aesthetic reasons.

In 2000 when the new Pagoda and Pagoda Plaza were built, the yard of bricks was extended from the track surface across the pit lane and then through to the spectator areas in the new Pagoda Plaza.

=== Gasoline Alley ===
The garage area at the Indianapolis Motor Speedway is known as "Gasoline Alley". The nickname dates back to the early decades of the race, and for a time, referred specifically to one particular spot in the back where cars would refuel. Though the exact origin of the name is unclear, it may be loosely linked to the eponymous comic strip. Later, the nickname was used for the main corridor of the garage area, and eventually was used colloquially for the entire garage complex. The use of gasoline at the Indy 500 was phased out in favor of methanol beginning in 1965 (and later ethanol in 2006), but the nickname nonetheless remained. Gasoline was not used again at Indy until NASCAR arrived for the Brickyard 400 in 1994.

The first garage area consisted of one double-sided bank of garages running east–west. It was in the same general location as the present day complex. In the very early years, the foreign entries were housed in a second garage complex outside of turn two. In 1929, a second row of garages was constructed alongside the first, creating the soon-to-be familiar Gasoline Alley corridor. The original garages were known for their signature green and white barn doors, and were sometimes visually compared to horse stables, as the complex loosely resembled a horse racing paddock.

One of the fixtures of the garage area in the pre-WWII years was Tom Beall's diner, an outdoor restaurant and gathering place, popular with drivers, mechanics, officials, and fans. Bealle often allowed drivers to run up a tab during the month of May, allowing them to pay their bill once they received their prize money at the end of the month. Around 1974–1975, since the entry fee was still relatively small, Jim Hurtubise was known for entering three cars (despite perhaps only having one or two cars in running condition) in order to rent three garages. He would convert the third garage stall into a bar & lounge to entertain himself and his team and friends, although officials and track management took a dim view of it. In later years, in order to curtail similar actions, entry fees were substantially increased and entrants were required to show proof of the car(s) existence before their entry was accepted. In addition, by the 1980s, teams began setting up hospitality tents specifically for that purpose, and furthermore, an abundance of permanent hospitality suites - many adjacent to the garage area, were later constructed to supplement.

A fire swept through the garage area on the morning of the 1941 race, and burned down a significant portion of the south bank of garages. They were replaced, and eventually the complex expanded to 88 stalls. As the sport grew, and the cars and teams became larger and more sophisticated, work space was increasingly limited in the garages. Amenities were simple, corridors were heavily congested, and by the 1980s, the cars and teams had outgrown the aging facility. With car counts swelling in the 1970s and early 1980s to sometimes over 100 entries, some smaller teams were left out and forced to work out of tents. Even the formidable teams found themselves needing to store some of their equipment (tools, tires, bodywork, etc.) outside the doors or back at their transporters because there simply was not enough room. A second fire during a private test session in 1964 caused damage, and raised concerns about safety.

Despite their lack of modern amenities, the garages had a nostalgic quaintness admired by participants and fans, and they also served important intrinsic purposes for the teams. For many years, the entry fee for the Indianapolis 500 provided a garage stall to the competitors not just for the month of May, but for the entire offseason as well. It was a valuable asset to some teams, especially small-budget teams without a race shop, and it would serve as their year-round headquarters. It was not uncommon for teams to even house other types of race cars there (sprints, midgets, stock cars) as they competed in the Indiana short track circuits during the summer. Even larger, more established teams still might use the garage stall for storage or as a staging location for cross-country trips to other races.

Following the 1985 race, the original Gasoline Alley garage area was torn down and replaced with a state-of-the-art, multimillion-dollar garage complex. The nickname "Gasoline Alley" remained when the new complex opened in 1986. In 2000, an additional row of garages was constructed alongside the pit lane on the main stretch, in preparations for the U.S. Grand Prix. They are not considered part of Gasoline Alley. In 2011, NASCAR began using the pitside garages for Cup Series teams at the Brickyard 400 with one garage used for NASCAR inspection. Lower-series teams and (since 2016) non-exempted teams use Gasoline Alley. Today in total, there are 133 garage stalls -- three buildings with 32 stalls each and 37 garages on the main straight. On occasion, for major road course events such as years with the SCCA Runoffs are held at the Speedway, all four garages may be used.

=== The Snake Pit ===
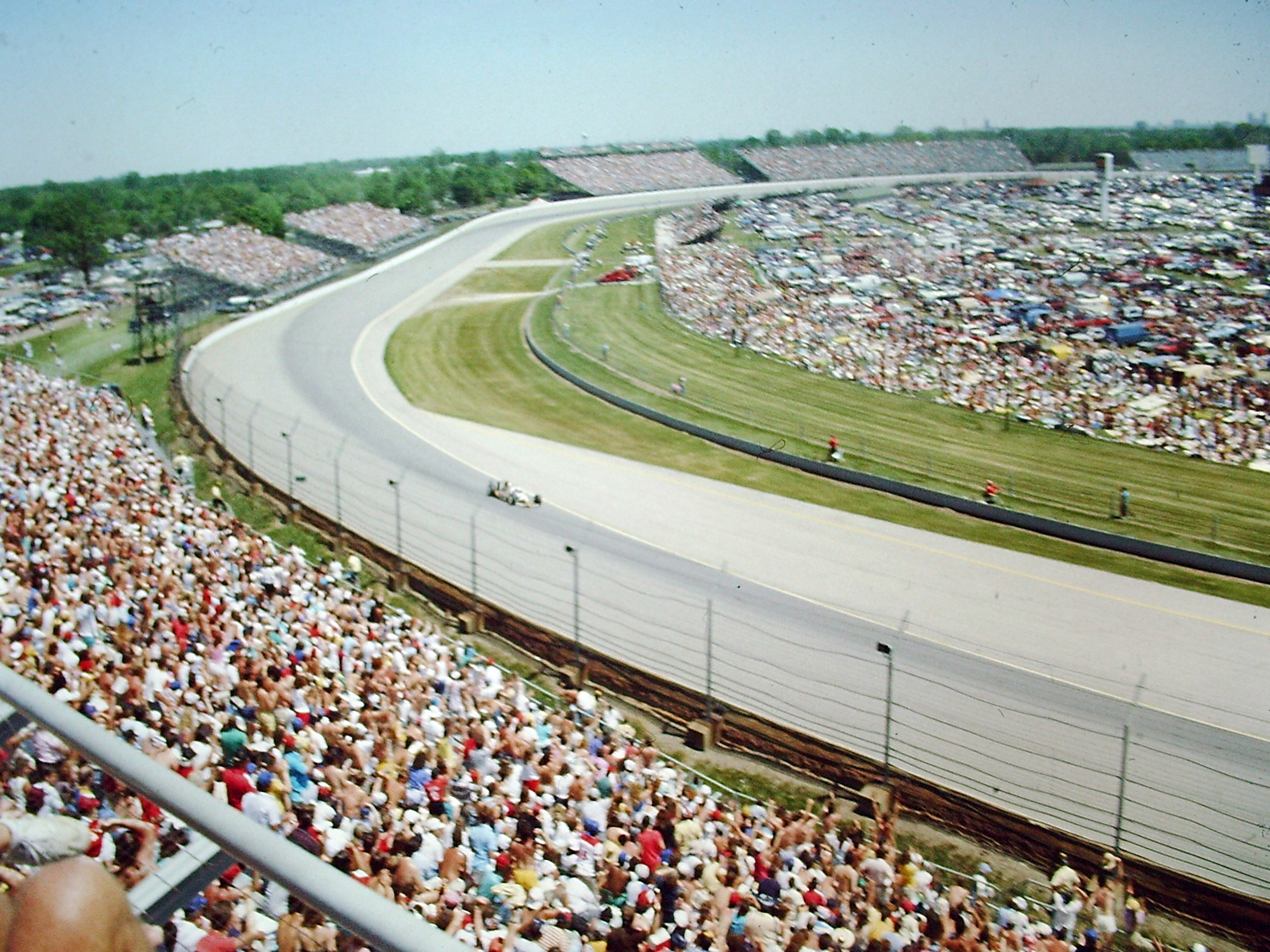
The Turn 4 infield ("Snake Pit II") seen on pole day in 1988.

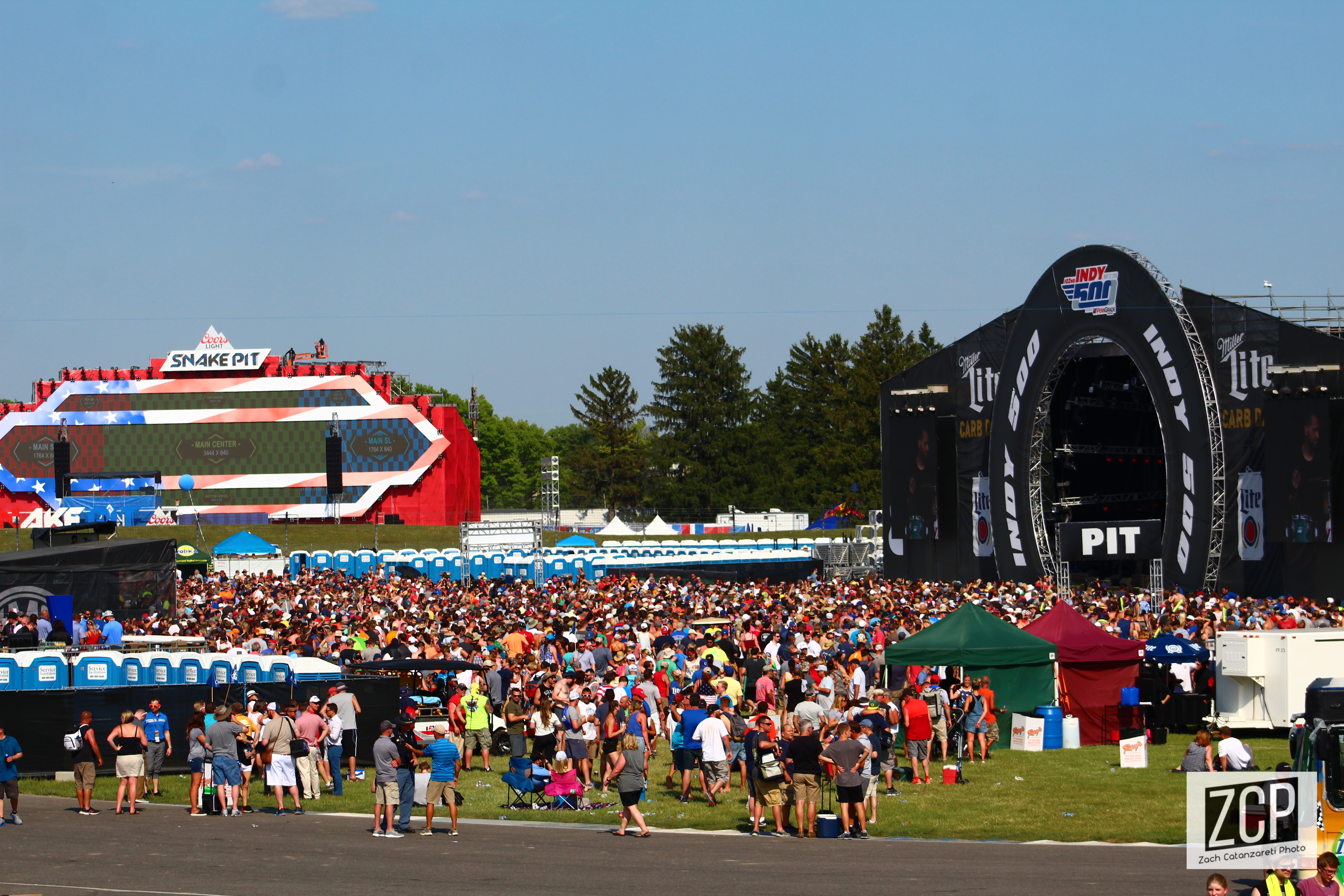
[New] Snake Pit on the left, 2018

The infield of the track in the vicinity of turn one was known as the "Snake Pit". (sometimes "Snakepit"). Long known for a reputation of rowdiness, heavy alcohol consumption, bikers, streaking, flashing, and an overall Woodstock/Mardi Gras atmosphere, the Snake Pit was a popular location for college-age and counterculture fans to spend time at the track, many of whom had little or no interest in the actual racing activities. Like the infield at the Kentucky Derby, the Snake Pit was often considered a rite of spring, and an excuse to party with abandon. Arrests for public intoxication, disorderly conduct, fights, and drug possession were frequent and common.

The area that eventually became the Snake Pit took shape very early on, prior to World War I. In the early decades of the Speedway, a railroad line connected Union Station in downtown Indianapolis out to the track and beyond. Many fans in the early years (and through 1963) arrived at the race by train. A train depot was located across the road from the Speedway, near the intersection of present-day 16th Street and Georgetown Road. The spectators disembarked the trains and poured directly into the main entrance, strategically placed across from the station at the outside of turn one. Fans that did not have grandstand tickets gathered in the general admission infield, particularly the turn one infield. The area became a popular place for picnicking and race viewing. Sometime in the mid/late-1950s, it started to gain a raucous reputation, which intensified in the 1960s. It reached its zenith of popularity and intensity of revelry during the decade of the 1970s. The nickname "Snake Pit" was coined sometime in the early/mid-1960s, and appeared in print at least as early as 1968.

In periods of rain, the area usually became overwhelmed with mud, and mud wrestling was commonly observed. By the end of the race, the area would be littered with cans, bottles, and inordinate amounts of trash and abandoned belongings. Bonfires and burned cars were also noted. In 1975, management allowed cars to fully park in the area, as an early effort to settle the crowd by reducing available capacity. Occasionally, the rowdiness was reported as less tumultuous, such as 1977 when many infield revelers instead stormed the fountain in front of the Speedway museum to cool off from the hot day.

In 1980, a fatality occurred in the area after a Jeep flipped over. Around that time, track management decided to take deliberate steps to curtail the revelry, and make the infield more "family-friendly". For the 1981 race, bleachers were erected in the turn one infield. In addition, capital improvements that included the new Gasoline Alley, a place for competitors to park motor homes, new support buildings, new restroom buildings, media parking lots, and other changes to the site, gradually and deliberately scaled back the size of the area. As a result, by the late 1980s, the patrons migrated to the infield of turn four, and the less-intense Snake Pit II emerged.

By the 1990s, the intensity of the rowdiness had dropped substantially, due largely to third-generation management at the Speedway (Tony George) and beefed up law enforcement. By the end of the 20th century, it almost disappeared completely.

The turn four infield was razed in 1999 to make room for the infield road course. The race day party scene migrated again, this time to its current location, the turn three infield. The Snake Pit eventually became more of a festive party zone. Later, the original turn one location was also razed to make room for road course modifications, a section sometimes referred to as the "Snake Pit" section. In 2010, the turn three infield was officially named the [New] Snake Pit, and began to be organized and officially marketed by management. On race day, a concert stage is erected, and popular music acts, and DJ's perform to entertain the infield crowd in a controlled and festive environment. While rock music typically headlines the Carb Day concert, and country music headlines the Legends Day concert, EDM is featured at the Snake Pit. By the late-2010s, the revelry in the Snake Pit had somewhat re-intensified, however, not to the levels witnessed in the 1970s.

Snake Pit concerts (race day)

- 2011: Action Jackson, Andy & Annie Skinner, Andy D
- 2012: EDI, DJ Lockstar, Krewella, Benny Benassi
- 2013: Topher Jones, Diplo, Afrojack
- 2014: DJ Lockstar, Matt Dash, Dillon Francis, NERVO, Hardwell
- 2015: Sinclair Wheeler, Caked Up, Milk 'N' Cookies, A-Trak, Steve Aoki, Kaskade
- 2016: BOAT (Big Once and Trentino), DJ Mustard, Zeds Dead, Martin Garrix, Skrillex
- 2017: the Trap House, Action Bronson, Adventure Club, RL Grime, Marshmello, Zedd, with host Ric Flair
- 2018: GRiZ, Diplo, deadmau5, Axwell Λ Ingrosso
- 2019: Ricky Retro, Chris Lake, Illenium, Alesso, Skrillex
- 2020: Concert cancelled due to COVID-19 pandemic (scheduled to be Martin Garrix, Galantis, Rezz, Steve Aoki and Yellow Claw)
- 2021: Concert cancelled due to COVID-19 pandemic
- 2022: Martin Garrix, deadmau5, Galantis, Steve Aoki, Yellow Claw with grand marshal Titus O'Neil
- 2023: Kaskade, Subtronics, John Summit, Valentino Khan, Jauz
- 2024: Excision, Dom Dolla, Gryffin, Sullivan King, Timmy Trumpet
- 2025: Illenium, Sammy Virji, Two Friends, Kayzo, Oliver Heldens, with grand marshal Rob Gronkowski
- 2026: Zedd, Crankdat, Wooli, it's murph, Wax Motif

=== Coke Lot ===
Similar to the aforementioned "Snake Pit," the Coke Lot which is located outside the track, is the most noteworthy and popular camping location on the grounds of the Speedway. Officially designated as Lot 1C, it has been nicknamed the "Coke Lot" for decades due to the presence of a Coca-Cola bottling plant located on an adjacent property. The lot is an open field situated just to the northwest of the track, outside of turn 4 of the oval, off of Georgetown Road. Long known for intense revelry and all-night partying (particularly on the night before the race), the Coke Lot is a festive area and party scene for RVs and campers, as well as tent campers. The lot typically opens a few days before the race and allows fans to stay through the entire race weekend. It has been observed by many that the outline of the main parcel of the Coke Lot coincidentally resembles the outline of the state of Indiana.

While the Coke Lot is the most notorious camping area, several other camping lots are also situated around the vicinity of the Speedway, some focusing on family-friendly environments, while others are considered premium lot for high-end RV'ers.

In years past, another camping area called the "North 40" (named due to its size of approximately 40 acres) was another scene of intense overnight revelry. In the 1970s, its revelry surpassed that of the Coke Lot. Located directly north of the track off of 30th Street, in close proximity to the Speedway's golf course, and backed up against a neighborhood of homes, it is no longer used for camping. Currently it is only utilized for daytime car parking, and employee parking. During its peak, security had to begin using giant searchlights to keep North 40 campers from illegally wandering onto the golf course property late into the night.

=== Food ===
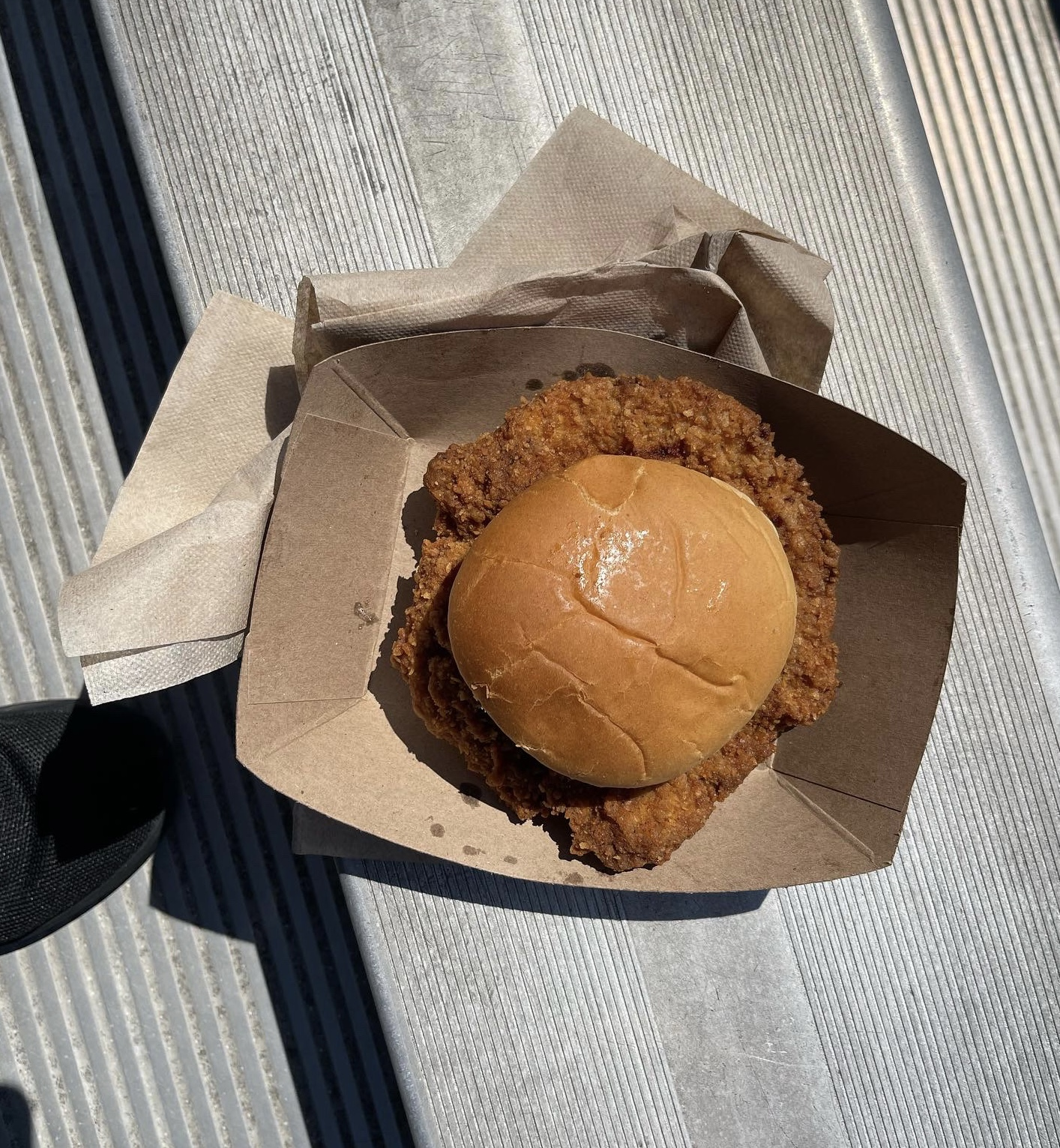
Pork tenderloin sandwich served at the 2022 Indianapolis 500

A traditional food of choice at the Indianapolis Motor Speedway is the pork tenderloin sandwich. The sandwich is a well-known Midwestern creation, and is sold at the track concessions.

Beer (largely domestic) is consumed in considerable amounts at the track. Unlike most sports stadiums and arenas, at Indianapolis (and most speedways), spectators are allowed to bring their own alcoholic beverages into the track for consumption. Beer is also sold at concessions. Glass bottles, however, are strictly prohibited at the track. Broken glass is considered an extreme hazard to the race cars (cut tires) on the track.

Peanuts are considered bad luck. An ambiguous, long-standing superstition against eating peanuts at the racetrack has dominated Indianapolis dating back to at least the 1940s. Legend says, though unconfirmed, that a crashed car was found with peanut shells in the cockpit. As of 2009, however, peanuts are sold at trackside concessions, and the myth has lost a lot of its following.

From the mid-1960s until her death in 1975, Mary Catherine "Mom" Unser (mother of Jerry, Bobby, and Al) was a well-known fixture at the race. She became famous for her spicy chili. Each year, she would treat the participants to a cookout in the garage area.

Several local restaurants, both current and former, have been popular gathering places for participants and fans during the month of May. Establishments include St. Elmo Steak House, Charlie Brown's Pancake and Steak House, Mug-n-Bun, and Long's Bakery. The aforementioned Tom Bealle's diner was a fixture of the garage area for many years. Redevelopment of Speedway's main street has created an area of popular establishments and nightlife, including Sarah Fisher's 1911 Grill (since closed), and A. J. Foyt's Foyt Wine Vault. A White Castle used to stand across the street from the track, as did a Steak 'n Shake, but both have since been demolished. From the 1930s to the 1960s, Mate's White Front Tavern was a popular hangout for drivers and crews. Located just a few blocks east of the speedway, it was sold to new management in the early 1960s and was kept open until the mid-1980s. A Taco Bell just east of the Speedway has gained subtle notoriety with fans after IndyCar drivers Scott Dixon and Dario Franchitti were mugged in the parking lot in 2017.

=== Superstitions ===
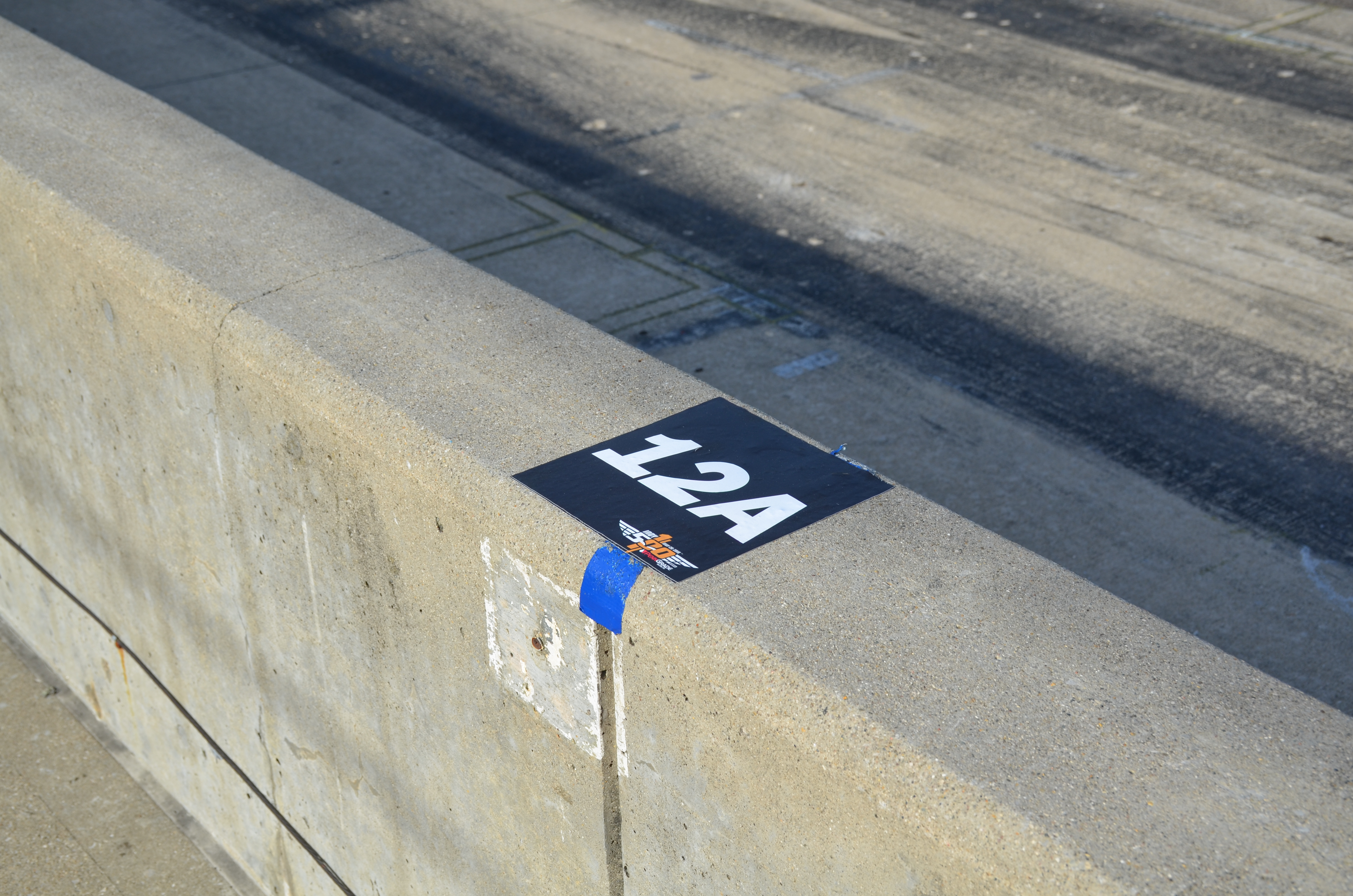
In the pit area at Indianapolis, there is no pit stall #13. It is substituted with #12A.

Numerous superstitions have developed at the Indianapolis 500 over the years. Most date back many decades, although some have lost a considerable amount of following. Among the prevailing superstitions in the modern day include the ongoing "Andretti curse" and "Curse of the Smiths" (see below).

Older superstitions that have been popular at Indianapolis include some of the following:

- Number 13: Triskaidekaphobia - fear of the use of the Number 13 - has prevailed at Indianapolis dating back to the first 500 in 1911. In that year, the car assigned 13 did not make the race. Only one driver carried #13 on their car for the remainder of the 20th century. In 1914, George Mason started 13th and finished 23rd. From 1926 to 2002, the use of #13 was officially disallowed by the rules. Most drivers avoided the use of number 13, however after changes in the rules, Greg Ray used the number in 2003. It was only the second time the number 13 had been used over the first 87 editions of the race. Subsequently, only two other drivers have used #13: E. J. Viso (2009) and Danica Patrick (2018). Both Viso and Patrick dropped out of the respective races.
- Green cars: A long-time superstition at Indianapolis has been against painting cars the color green. Many drivers and team prefer not to allow the color green on their cars, even if just on small decals or pinstriping. Apropos to that, there have been two green winning cars (1920 and 1965). As mentioned above, not only did Patrick use #13, her car also happened to be green. Ed Carpenter (who owned Patrick's #13 car) drove a green car in the 2017 running with sponsorship from Fuzzy's Vodka.
- Peanuts: Peanuts are considered bad luck (see Food above). An ambiguous, long-standing superstition against eating peanuts at the race track has dominated Indianapolis dating back to at least the 1940s.
- Miscellany: Numerous other and sometimes ambiguous superstitions have been promulgated by a myriad of drivers. However, many have lost much if not all of their following. Some included not allowing women and children near the cars, entering and exiting the cockpit on a particular side, not allowing photographs prior to going out on the track, and carrying good luck charms.

=== Curse of the Smiths ===
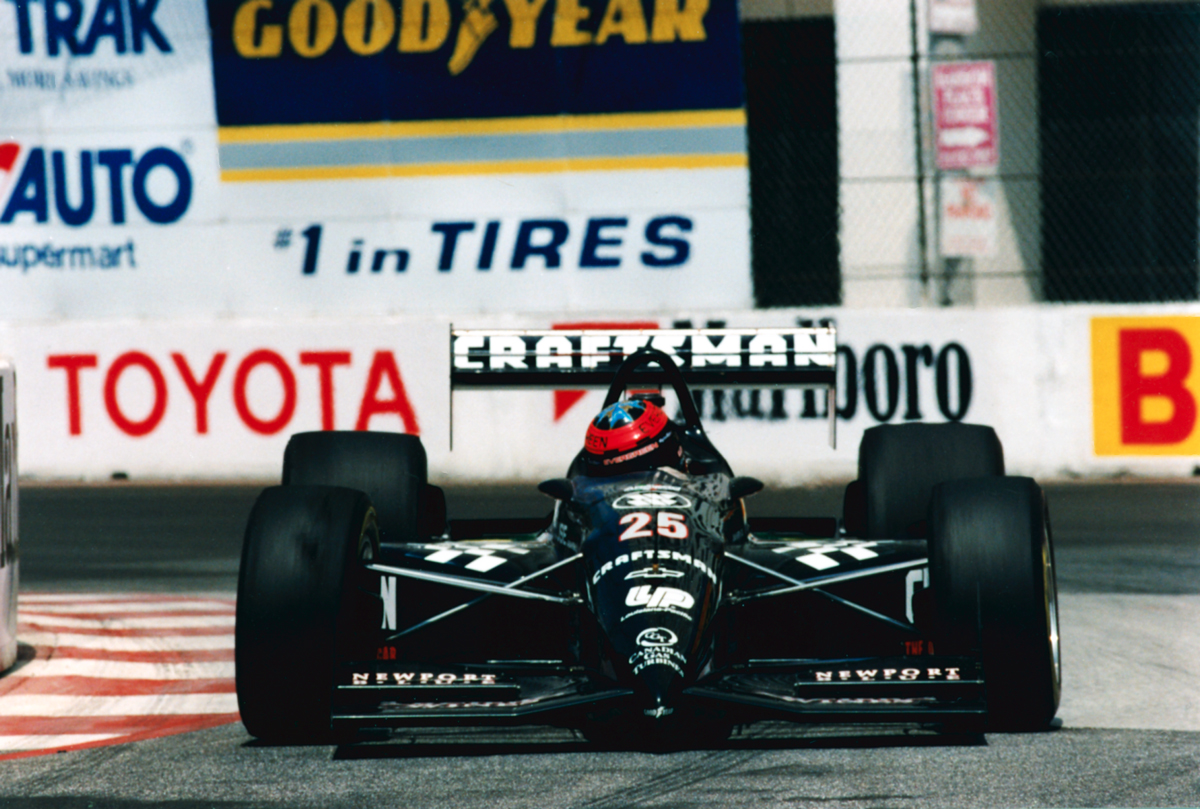
Mark Smith failed to qualify.

Among the over 800 drivers who have participated in the Indy 500, none have had the last name Smith, the most common surname in the United States. Several Smiths have attempted to make the race, the last being Mark Smith who failed to qualify in 1993 and 1994, despite finishing fifth at the 1994 Michigan 500. By contrast there have been ten different drivers with the last name Jones, five with the last name Johnson, and five with the last name Miller.

As of 2024, a total of five drivers with the surname Smith have ever competed in professional races at the Indianapolis Motor Speedway, albeit in different events. Regan Smith drove in the Brickyard 400 from 2008 to 2013 (with a best finish of 3rd in 2011). He also has competed in the Lilly Diabetes 250. Motorcyclist Bradley Smith competed in the Red Bull Indianapolis GP, with best finish of second in 2009. More recently, both Sammy Smith (with a best finish of 18th in 2024) and Chandler Smith (with a best finish of 33rd in 2024) have participated in NASCAR Xfinity Series events in 2023 (road course) and 2024 (oval) and Zane Smith participated in the Brickyard 400 in 2024 (finishing 17th). Indy NXT driver Tommy Smith also competed in events on the road course in 2025.

One driver with a German language translation of Smith has participated, however, with Sam Schmidt making three starts.

=== Rabbits ===
A longstanding legend at the Indianapolis Motor Speedway involves bunny rabbits. From 1911 to 1993, there was traditionally only one race held annually at the Speedway. Activity outside the month of May was limited to semi-occasional tire testing. Thus for eleven months out of the year, the grounds were noticeably quiet, green and lush, particularly after nine holes of a golf course were built in the spacious infield in 1929. The well-manicured grounds naturally became a home for fauna, particularly rabbits and other small vermin. As the race participants would arrive in the spring, they would often be greeted by numerous rabbits roaming the grounds, oftentimes running out on the track. The rabbits were thought to be welcome and some considered them symbols of good luck. However, they were sometimes a nuisance, causing yellows for running out on the track and evading capture. Al Unser famously ran over a rabbit during the 1988 race. The well-known presence of rabbits at the Speedway even began a tradition that a rabbit would appear somewhere in the race program each year.

== Pre-race ceremonies ==
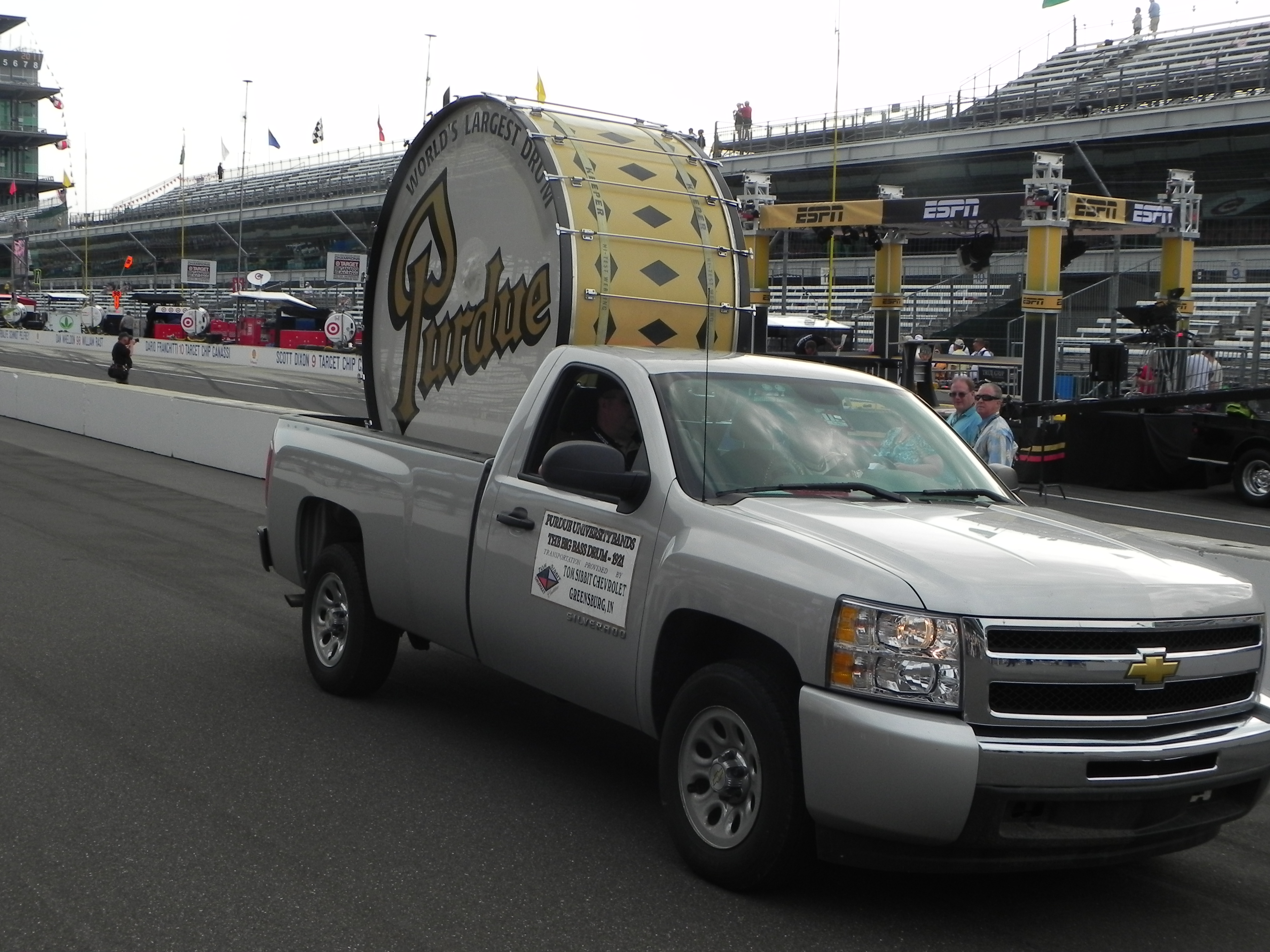
Purdue University Band "World's Largest Drum" at the 2011 Indianapolis 500.

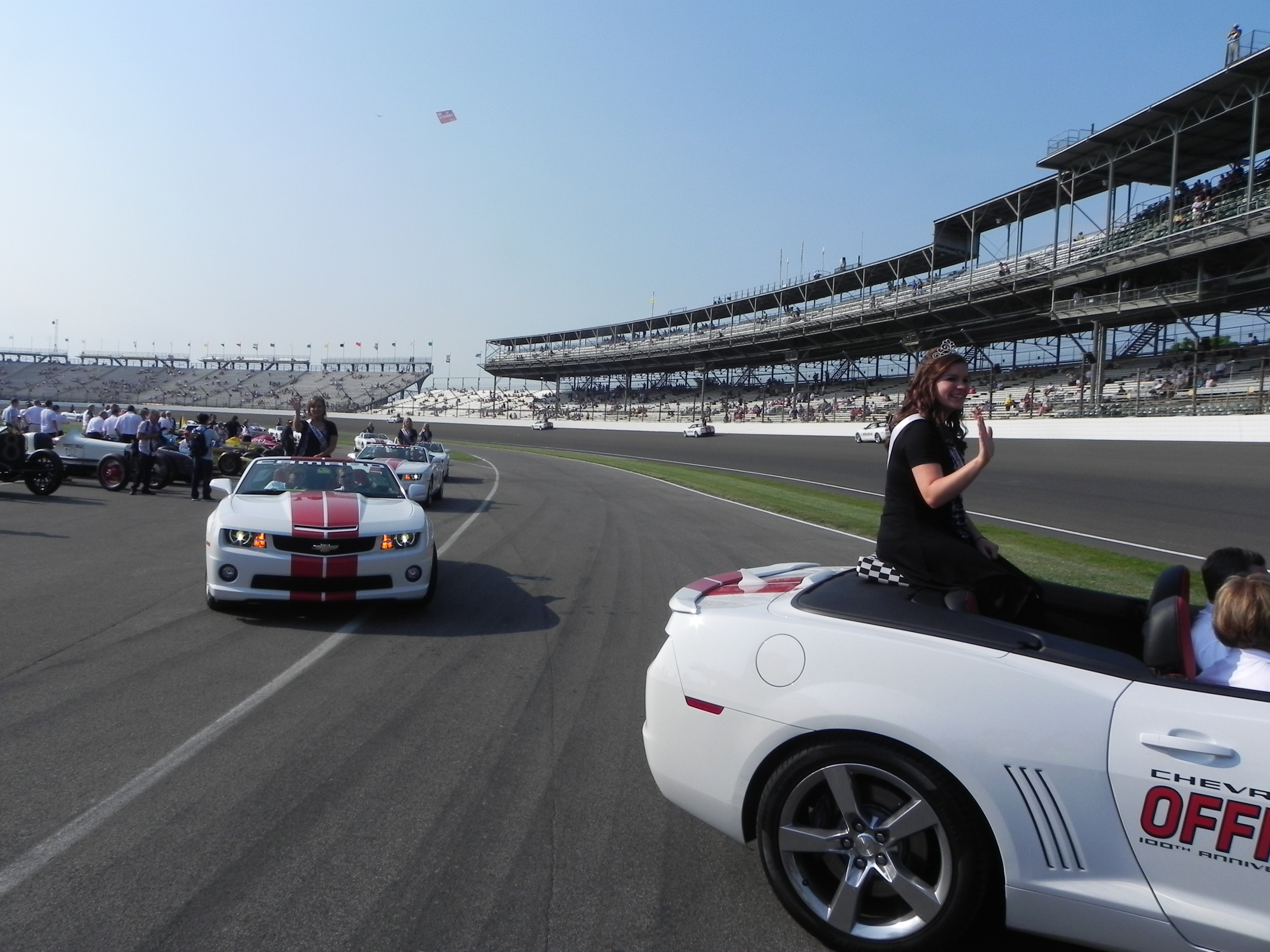
500 Festival Queen and Princesses caravan at the 2011 Indianapolis 500.

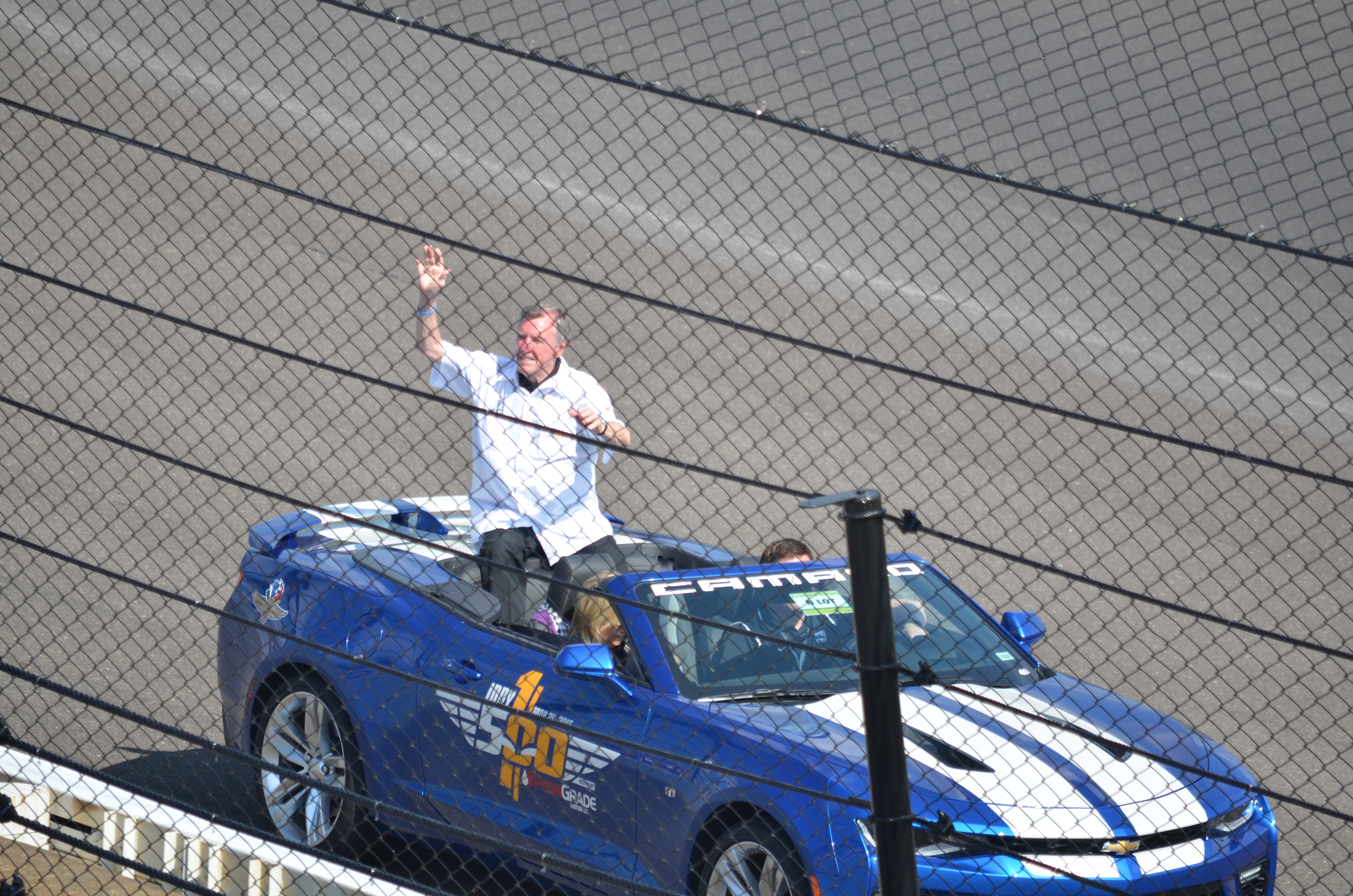
Johnny Rutherford during the former winners parade at the 2016 Indianapolis 500.

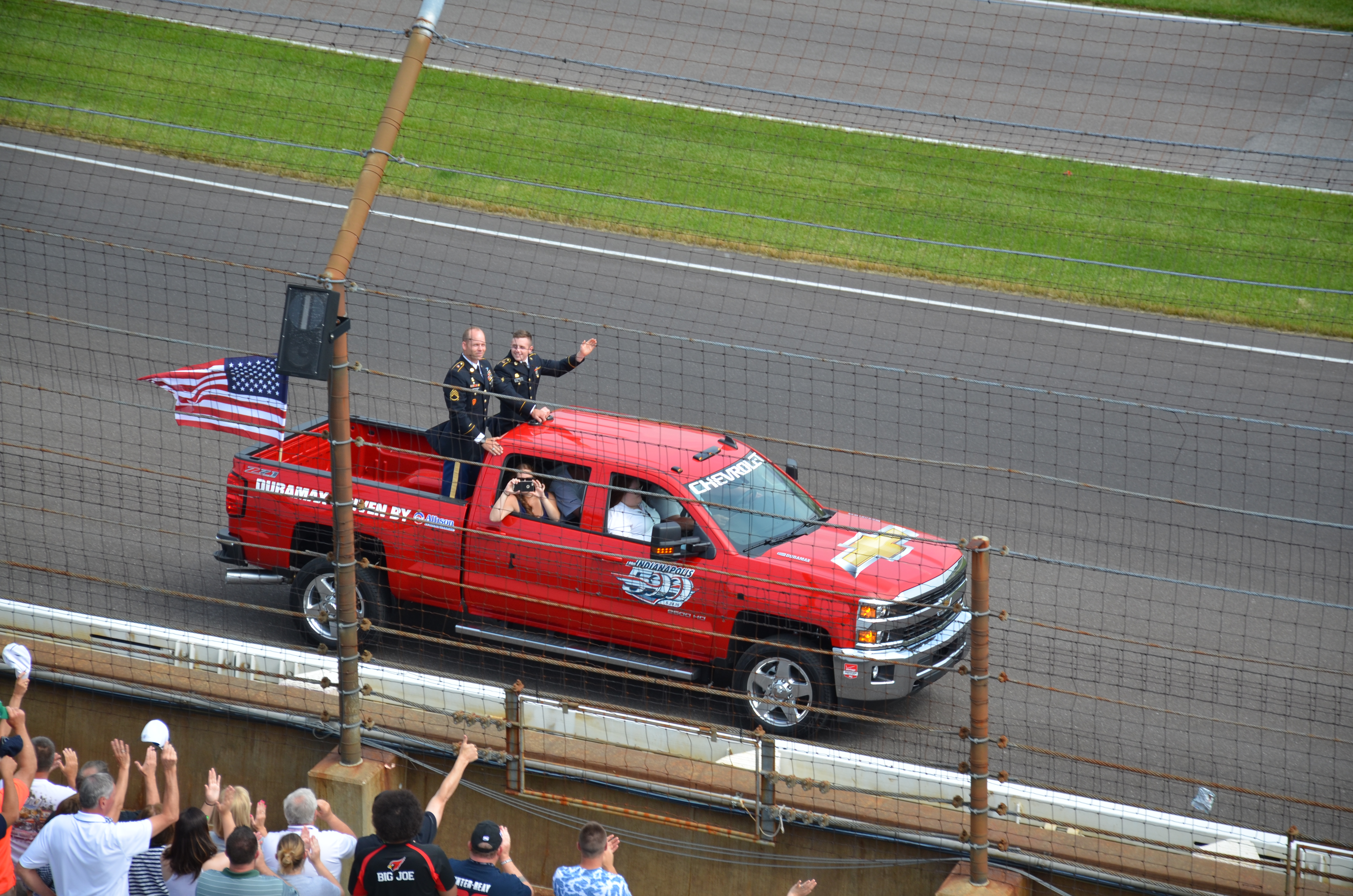
Military Appreciation Lap at the 2015 Indianapolis 500.

- At 6 a.m., and in some years as early as 5 a.m., an aerial bomb is set off to signal the opening of the gates.
- At 8 a.m., the "Parade of Bands" marches a lap around the racing circuit. Numerous marching bands from nearby and neighboring high schools and universities entertain the early arriving fans. This tradition dates back to 1922, and celebrated its 90th anniversary in 2015. Most of the bands in attendance also participate in the 500 Festival Parade downtown the day before. Traditional participants include the Purdue All-American Marching Band (along with the World's Largest Drum which is driven around the track) and Speedway High School. Due to rain showers the morning of the race in 2007, the bands instead paraded around the infield, including parts of the infield road course, as track crews were working to dry the track with trucks and jet dryers.
- The Purdue University All-American Marching Band plays several pre-race songs, including "On the Banks of the Wabash" and "Stars and Stripes Forever". The former played as the teams begin wheeling their cars to the starting grid. The band is believed to have first appeared at the race in 1919.
- In the 1960s to the 1990s, early arriving spectators would be entertained by Big band music. Songs by well-known Hoosier band leader George Freije and the Freije All Star Band were played over the public address system from roughly 6 a.m. to 8 a.m.
- In 1991, and in most years since about 2002, a special military appreciation lap has been held. Military personnel who have recently returned from active service overseas are honored in a parade around the track. In 1991, hundred of troops who had returned from Operation Desert Storm marched around the course on race morning. In the 2000s, troops (namely from Iraq and Afghanistan) have been paraded around in trucks and saluted by fans.
- About an hour or two before the race, there is a parade around the track (typically in convertible festival cars) of the 500 Festival Queen and her court of 500 Festival Princesses. Likewise, a similar parade of former race winners, celebrities in attendance, and other VIPs is conducted.
- In many years, a ceremonial lap of vintage race cars and/or vintage pace cars is conducted. In some cases, the original drivers (or surviving relatives) are behind the wheel.
- Starting in 2016, a new tradition was introduced, the "march to the bricks". The Borg-Warner Trophy is paraded through the infield to the start/finish line.
- Finally, driver introductions take place. They are usually in reverse starting order with the front row being introduced last. This is followed by the drivers being paraded around the track similar to the Festival Queen, her court, and other VIPs.

The pre-race ceremonies usually go in the following order:

- Invocation
- "Taps"
- "America the Beautiful" and "God Bless America"
- "The Star-Spangled Banner" followed by flyover
- "Drivers to your cars" command
- "Back Home Again in Indiana" (accompanied by a balloon release until 2021)
- Starting command

=== Grand marshal ===
In some years, a grand marshal has been named for the race. The duties of the grand marshal may include greeting drivers and dignitaries during pre-race ceremonies, and riding in the pace car. This person may or may not be the same grand marshal at the 500 Festival Parade. Unlike other races, the grand marshal does not give the starting command. In recent years, the grand marshal has been responsible for delivering the "Drivers to your cars" message.

- 1991: Norman Schwarzkopf
- 2015: Nastia Liukin
- 2016: Florence Henderson (her final appearance)
- 2018: Nick Goepper
- 2019: Matt Iseman & Akbar Gbaja-Biamila
- 2021: Dude Perfect
- 2022: Blake Shelton
- 2023: Stephanie Beatriz
- 2024: Dylan Sprouse
- 2025: Alex Rodriguez and Derek Jeter
- 2026: Caitlin Clark

=== National anthem ===
The Star-Spangled Banner has been performed before the start of the Indy 500 in most years. Up through the 1970s and early 1980s, the song was typically played by the Purdue All-American Marching Band without a vocalist. However, in some rare occasions, a vocalist was used. In 1976, Tom Sullivan and Up with People were invited to sing, as a gesture to the U.S. Bicentennial.

By the mid-1980s, the Speedway began inviting notable artists to perform the national anthem. In nearly all cases, they would be backed by the Purdue Band. In 1983, James A. Hubert flubbed the lyrics. He omitted the line "O'er the ramparts we watched, were so gallantly streaming?" and instead repeated the second line "What so proudly we hailed at the twilight's last gleaming", stumbling on the word "twilight" the second time around.

After the national anthem is performed, the public address announcer or the grand marshal gives the command "Drivers, to your cars!"

In 2001, Steven Tyler of Aerosmith caused a controversy after he changed the lyrics of the song. Recent performers include:

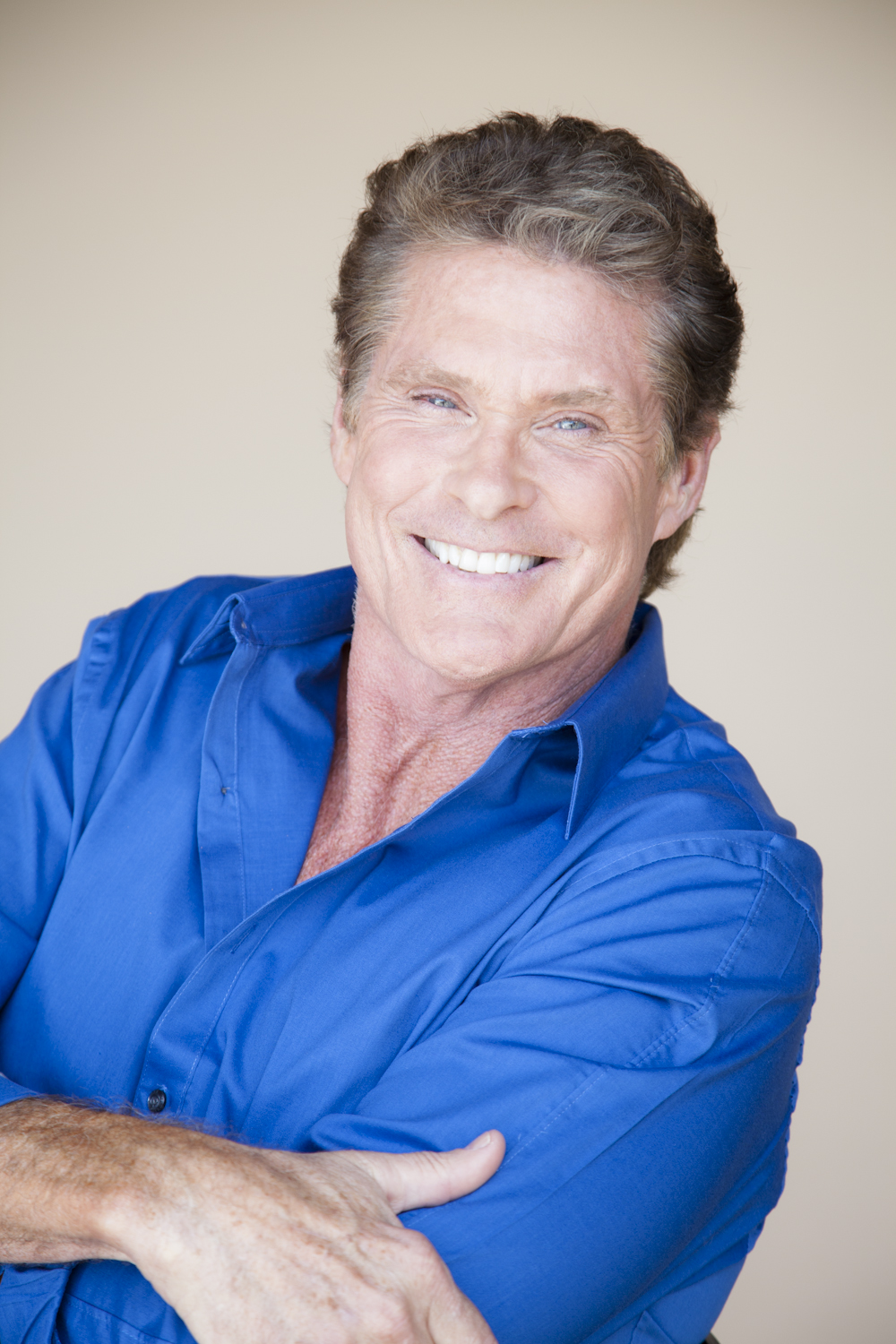
David Hasselhoff

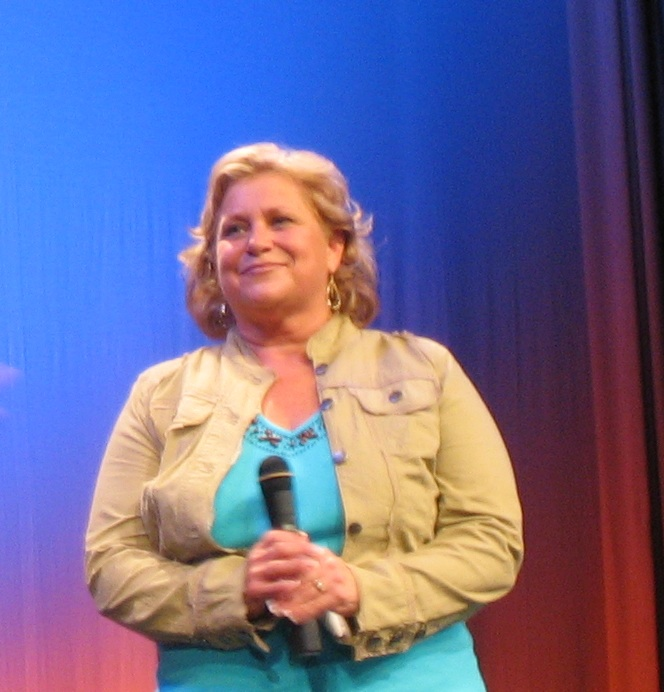
Sandi Patty

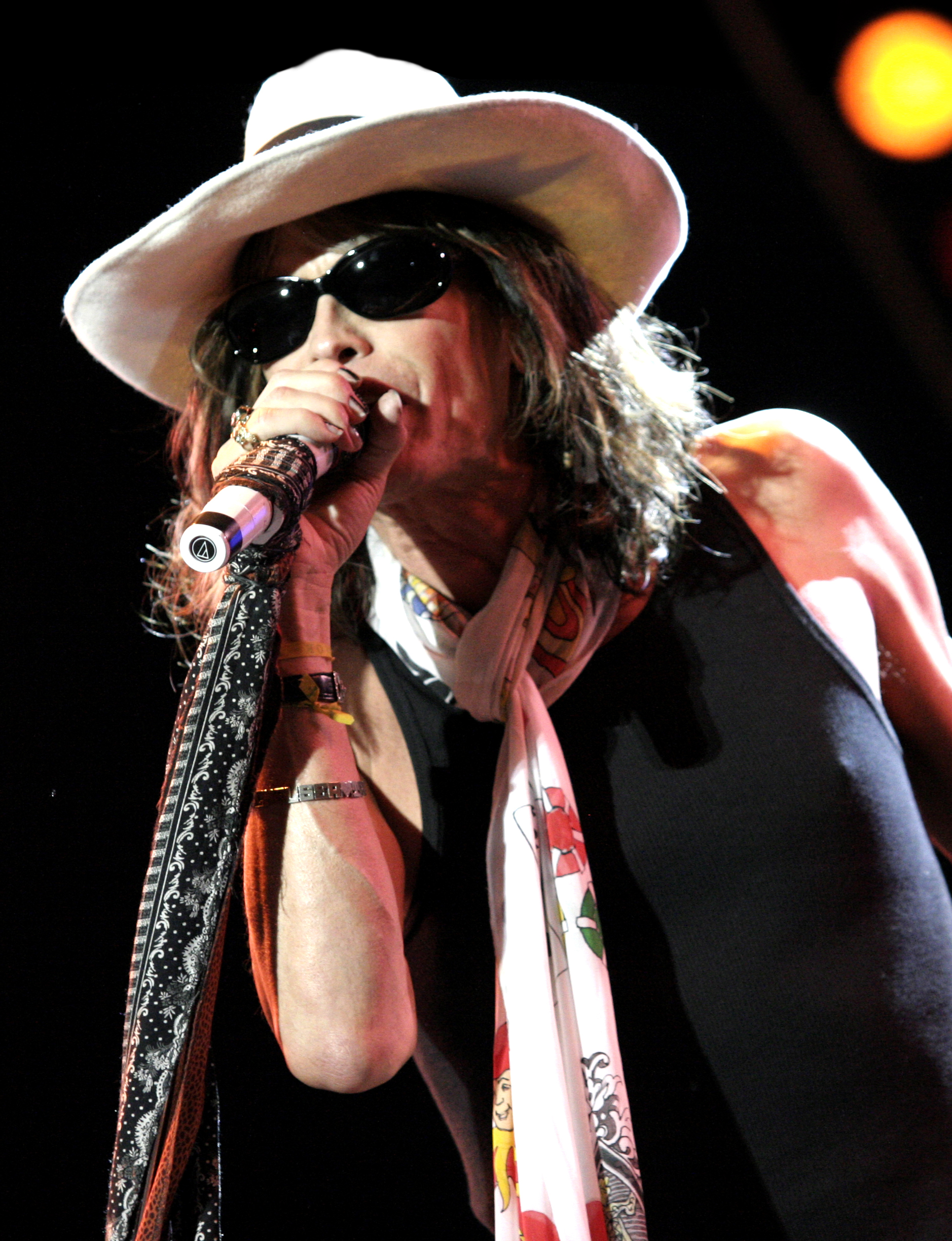
Steven Tyler

- 1960: Purdue Band
- 1961: Purdue Band
- 1962: Purdue Band
- 1963: Purdue Band
- 1964: Purdue Band
- 1965: Purdue Band
- 1966: Purdue Band
- 1967: Purdue Band
- 1968: Purdue Band
- 1969: Purdue Band
- 1970: Al Hirt (trumpet solo)
- 1971: Purdue Band
- 1972: Purdue Band
- 1973: Purdue Band
- 1974: Purdue Band
- 1975: Purdue Band
- 1976: Tom Sullivan and Up with People
- 1977: Purdue Band
- 1978: Purdue Band
- 1979: Purdue Band
- 1980: Purdue Band
- 1981: Purdue Band
- 1982: Louis Sudler
- 1983: James A. Hubert
- 1984: Robert McFarland
- 1985: Robert McFarland
- 1986: David Hasselhoff
- 1987: Sandi Patty
- 1988: Sandi Patty
- 1989: Tom Hudnut (brother of Indianapolis mayor Bill Hudnut)
- 1990: Sandi Patty
- 1991: Sandi Patty
- 1992: Sandi Patty and the Voices of Liberty
- 1993: Florence Henderson
- 1994: Florence Henderson
- 1995: Florence Henderson
- 1996: Florence Henderson
- 1997: Florence Henderson
- 1998: Elizabeth Burch
- 1999: CeCe Winans
- 2000: Jessica Andrews
- 2001: Steven Tyler
- 2002: Josephine Holmon (West Point cadet)
- 2003: Daniel Rodríguez
- 2004: Jessica Simpson
- 2005: Members of U.S. Armed Forces
  - SrA Edward "Justin" Allen (United States Air Force)
  - SSG Mark Roberts (United States Army)
  - SSG Remayl Shaffer-Hardy (United States Marine Corps)
  - Petty Officer Sharalee Wirt (United States Navy)
- 2006: Members of U.S. Armed Forces
  - SSgt Edward "Justin" Allen (United States Air Force)
  - SGT Jennifer Castle (Army National Guard)
  - (MU1) Lisa Taylor (United States Coast Guard)
  - GySgt Remayl Shaffer-Hardy (United States Marine Corps)
  - Petty Officer (MU3) Landon Crissup (United States Navy)
- 2007: Members of U.S. Armed Forces
  - SMSgt Angela Burns (United States Air Force)
  - Petty Officer Lisa Williamson (United States Coast Guard)
  - SSG Colin Eaton (United States Army)
  - Petty Officer J. David Sigmon (United States Navy)
  - SGT Terri Kopetzki (United States Marine Corps)
- 2008: Julianne Hough
- 2009: Major Lisa Kopczynski (Indiana National Guard)
- 2010: Jewel
- 2011: Seal and Kelly Clarkson, accompanied by David Foster on piano.
- 2012: Martina McBride
- 2013: Sandi Patty
- 2014: LeAnn Rimes
- 2015: Jordin Sparks
- 2016: Darius Rucker
- 2017: Bebe Rexha
- 2018: Kelly Clarkson
- 2019: Kelly Clarkson
- 2020: Dr. Elvis Francois & Dr. William Robinson (the "Singing Surgeons")
- 2021: Jimmie Allen
- 2022: Jordan Fisher
- 2023: Jewel
- 2024: Jordin Sparks
- 2025: Natalie Grant
- 2026: Jordin Sparks

=== Other songs ===
In most years since 1991, the songs "America the Beautiful" and/or "God Bless America" have been performed. Florence Henderson, a native Hoosier, was a friend of the Hulman-George family that owned the Speedway at the time. Henderson performed one of the two songs numerous times, book-ending years when she performed the national anthem instead. Her performances were usually not televised.

The performance of "America the Beautiful" was introduced for the race's 75th anniversary running in 1991, in part due to Operation Desert Storm. Henderson switched to the national anthem for 1993–1997, then resumed "America the Beautiful" in 1999. In 2003, her performance was switched to "God Bless America," which became more popular in the post-9/11 era. She continued through 2015, then served as grand marshal for her final race in 2016. Henderson died six months after the 2016 race. Henderson routinely sang the entire song, including the prologue, and in some years sang the chorus a second time.

By 2009, "America the Beautiful" was re-added to the ceremonies. In 1999, Lee Greenwood did a special performance of "God Bless the USA", and in 2003, Darryl Worley performed "Have You Forgotten?". In 2005, 3 Doors Down did a special performance of "Kryptonite" from the Pagoda, as part of the driver introductions.

==== "America the Beautiful" ====
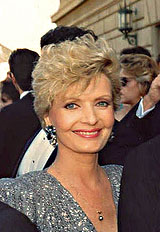
Florence Henderson

- 1991: Florence Henderson
- 1992: Florence Henderson
- 1993—1998: Not performed
- 1999: Florence Henderson
- 2000: Florence Henderson
- 2001: Florence Henderson
- 2002: Florence Henderson
- 2003—2008: Not performed
- 2009: Miss America 2009 Katie Stam
- 2010: Major Lisa Kopczynski (Indiana National Guard)
- 2011: Miss America 2011 Teresa Scanlan
- 2012: Specialist Ron Walker
- 2013: Lindsey Kraner
- 2014: Martina McBride
- 2015: Danielle Bradbery
- 2016: Not performed
- 2017: 101st Airborne Division (Air Assault) Band; vocalist Rick Walburn
- 2018: Indiana National Guard Trio
- 2019: Indiana National Guard Trio
- 2020: Not performed
- 2021: Indiana National Guard Trio
- 2022: Girl Named Tom
- 2023: Indiana National Guard Trio
- 2024: Indiana National Guard Trio
- 2025: Ephraim Owens
- 2026: Ephraim Owens

==== "God Bless America" ====
- 2003: Florence Henderson
- 2004: Florence Henderson
- 2005: Florence Henderson
- 2006: Florence Henderson
- 2007: Florence Henderson
- 2008: Florence Henderson
- 2009: Florence Henderson
- 2010: Florence Henderson
- 2011: Florence Henderson
- 2012: Florence Henderson
- 2013: Jon McLaughlin
- 2014: Florence Henderson
- 2015: Florence Henderson
- 2016: Indianapolis Children's Choir
- 2017: Angela Brown
- 2018: Jon McLaughlin
- 2019: Chevel Shepherd
- 2020: Dr. Elvis Francois & Dr. William Robinson (NBC Special "Back Home Again" on May 24)
- 2021: Generald Wilson
- 2022: Not performed
- 2023: Angela Brown
- 2024: Phillip Phillips
- 2025: Arturo Chacón Cruz
- 2026: Angela Brown

==== "God Bless The USA" ====
- 1999: Lee Greenwood
- 2019: Lee Greenwood

=== Invocation ===
Starting in 1974, the Indy 500 was moved to the Sunday of Memorial Day weekend. As a gesture, the Speedway added an invocation to the pre-race ceremonies. In most years since 1980, the Speedway has invited a representative of the Roman Catholic Archdiocese of Indianapolis. In selected years, others have been invited including nationally famous clergymen Oral Roberts and Billy Graham.

The Most Reverend Archbishop Edward T. O'Meara participated several times until his death in early 1992. Archbishop Daniel M. Buechlein then took over as the traditional clergy starting in 1993. Buechlein customarily ended his invocation with the word "Godspeed" in the languages of all of the participating drivers. Buechlein's final year at the race was 2009, and he died in 2018 after a lengthy illness.

- 1974: Rev. Ray Montgomery
- 1975: Rev. Ray Montgomery
- 1976: Rev. Ray Montgomery
- 1977: Oral Roberts
- 1978: Rev. James Bonke
- 1979: Rev. James Bonke
- 1980: Archbishop Edward T. O'Meara
- 1981: Archbishop Edward T. O'Meara
- 1982: Rev. James Bonke
- 1983: Archbishop Edward T. O'Meara
- 1984: Archbishop Edward T. O'Meara
- 1985: Archbishop Edward T. O'Meara
- 1986: Archbishop Edward T. O'Meara
- 1987: Archbishop Edward T. O'Meara
- 1988: Archbishop Edward T. O'Meara
- 1989: Archbishop Edward T. O'Meara
- 1990: Archbishop Edward T. O'Meara
- 1991: Archbishop Edward T. O'Meara
- 1992: Father Michael Welch
- 1993: Archbishop Daniel M. Buechlein
- 1994: Archbishop Daniel M. Buechlein
- 1995: Archbishop Daniel M. Buechlein
- 1996: Archbishop Daniel M. Buechlein
- 1997: Vicar general Joseph F. Schaedel
- 1998: Archbishop Daniel M. Buechlein
- 1999: Billy Graham
- 2000: Archbishop Daniel M. Buechlein
- 2001: Archbishop Daniel M. Buechlein
- 2002: Archbishop Daniel M. Buechlein
- 2003: Archbishop Daniel M. Buechlein
- 2004: Monsignor Joseph F. Schaedel
- 2005: Archbishop Daniel M. Buechlein
- 2006: Archbishop Daniel M. Buechlein
- 2007: Archbishop Daniel M. Buechlein
- 2008: Archbishop Daniel M. Buechlein
- 2009: Archbishop Daniel M. Buechlein
- 2010: Monsignor Joseph F. Schaedel
- 2011: Auxiliary bishop Christopher J. Coyne
- 2012: Auxiliary bishop Christopher J. Coyne
- 2013: Archbishop Joseph William Tobin
- 2014: Auxiliary bishop Christopher J. Coyne
- 2015: Archbishop Joseph William Tobin
- 2016: Archbishop Joseph William Tobin
- 2017: Father Michael Welch
- 2018: Archbishop Charles C. Thompson
- 2019: Archbishop Charles C. Thompson
- 2020: Archbishop Charles C. Thompson
- 2021: Archbishop Charles C. Thompson
- 2022: Archbishop Charles C. Thompson
- 2023: Archbishop Charles C. Thompson
- 2024: Archbishop Charles C. Thompson
- 2025: Archbishop Charles C. Thompson

=== Taps ===
In remembrance of Memorial Day, "Taps" is played, and a U.S. military aircraft does a flyover. In some years, multiple aircraft participate, executing the missing man formation. Traditionally, a member of the public address announcing team recited a preamble honoring those who have died in combat, and those who have perished in automobile racing. The preamble dated back to at least 1965. Jim Philippe recited the preamble until he died in 2003. Since then, it has been reprised three times: Dave Calabro (2006), Jerry Baker (2012), and Bob Jenkins (2019). Since 2000, a notable military or government official has also offered a tribute or remarks.

The traditional preamble goes as follows:

"On this Memorial Day weekend, we pause in a moment of silence, to pay homage to those individuals who have given their lives—unselfishly, and unafraid—so that we may witness as free men and women, the world's greatest sporting event. We also pay homage to those individuals, who have given their lives—unselfishly, and without fear—to make racing, the world's most spectacular spectator sport."

In the 1960s and 1970s, "Taps" was typically performed by a combined U.S. Armed Forces color guard. Then from the about 1980 through 2005, it was usually played by the full Purdue Band. In 1986 and 1997, due to rain delays, the Purdue Band was unable to stay for the pre-race ceremonies. In those years, a substitute performer(s) was used. Since 2006, "Taps" has been rendered as a trumpet solo. In 2016, the trumpeter moved from the trackside victory podium near the pits to the starter's stand outside the main stretch. Since 2006 "Taps" has been rendered by a trumpeter from the 38th Division, Indiana Army National Guard Band.

Rendering of "Taps"

- 1960: U.S. Armed Forces color guard
- 1961: U.S. Armed Forces color guard
- 1962: U.S. Armed Forces color guard
- 1963: U.S. Armed Forces color guard
- 1964: U.S. Armed Forces color guard
- 1965: U.S. Armed Forces color guard
- 1966: U.S. Armed Forces color guard
- 1967: U.S. Armed Forces color guard
- 1968: U.S. Armed Forces color guard
- 1969: U.S. Armed Forces color guard
- 1970: U.S. Armed Forces color guard
- 1971: U.S. Armed Forces color guard
- 1972: U.S. Armed Forces color guard
- 1973: U.S. Armed Forces color guard
- 1974: U.S. Armed Forces color guard
- 1975: U.S. Armed Forces color guard
- 1976: U.S. Armed Forces color guard
- 1977: U.S. Armed Forces color guard
- 1978: U.S. Armed Forces color guard
- 1979:
- 1980: Purdue Brass Quartet
- 1981:
- 1982: Combined U.S. Armed Forces color guard
- 1983: Purdue Band
- 1984: Purdue Band
- 1985: Combined U.S. Armed Forces color guard
- 1986: Ron Blomberg & Robert A. Nixon (74th Army Band of Fort Benjamin Harrison)
- 1987: Purdue Band
- 1988: Purdue Band
- 1989: Purdue Band
- 1990: Purdue Band
- 1991: Purdue Band
- 1992: Purdue Band
- 1993: Purdue Band
- 1994: Purdue Band
- 1995: Purdue Band
- 1996: Purdue Band
- 1997: Larry Wiseman
- 1998: Purdue Band
- 1999: Purdue Band
- 2000: Purdue Band
- 2001: Purdue Band
- 2002: Purdue Band
- 2003: Purdue Band
- 2004: Purdue Band
- 2005: Purdue Band
- 2006–2008: SGT Byron Bartosh (38th Infantry Division, Indiana Army National Guard Band)
- 2009–2010: SGT Joseph Young (38th Infantry Division, Indiana Army National Guard Band)
- 2011–2021: SFC Ron Duncan (38th Infantry Division, Indiana Army National Guard Band)
- 2022-2024: SSG Trevor Ewigleben (38th Infantry Division, Indiana Army National Guard Band)
- 2025: SGT Scott Burns (Indiana National Guard)

Remarks

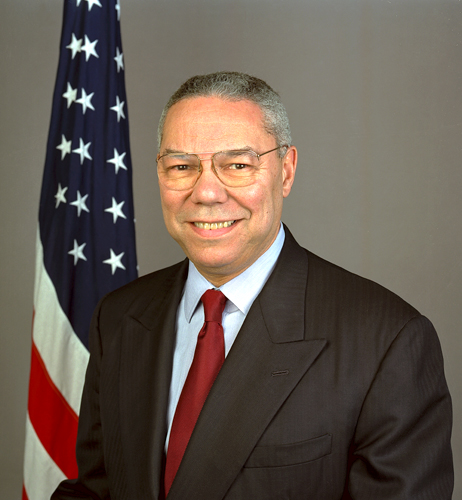
Colin Powell

- 2000: U. S. Secretary of Defense William Cohen
- 2001: General James L. Jones
- 2003: General Jack Keane
- 2004: General William J. Begert
- 2005: General Colin Powell (former United States Secretary of State)
- 2006: General Colin Powell (former United States Secretary of State)
- 2007: General Norman Schwarzkopf Jr.
- 2008: General Victor E. Renuart Jr.
- 2009: General Craig R. McKinley followed by a 3-volley salute
- 2010: Rear admiral John W. Miller followed by a 3-volley salute
- 2011: General Peter W. Chiarelli followed by a 3-volley salute
- 2012: Admiral James A. Winnefeld Jr. followed by a 3-volley salute
- 2013: Colonel Jack H. Jacobs followed by a 3-volley salute
- 2014: General Frank J. Grass followed by a 3-volley salute
- 2015: General Dennis L. Via followed by a 3-volley salute
- 2016: Lieutenant General Joseph Anderson followed by a 3-volley salute, and tribute to Pearl Harbor Survivors
- 2017: General Robert B. Abrams followed by a 3-volley salute
- 2018: General Joseph L. Lengyel followed by a 3-volley salute
- 2019: General Michael X. Garrett
- 2021: Lieutenant General David A. Krumm followed by a 3-volley salute

=== Fly-bys ===
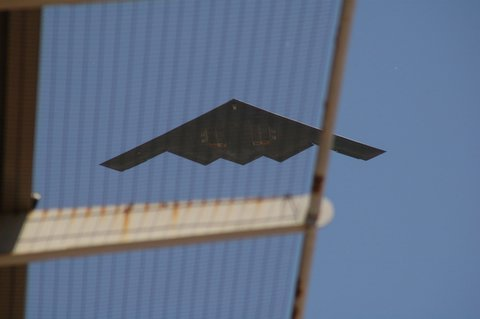
Stealth Bomber flyover at the 2005 Indianapolis 500

- 1991 – Four A-10s
- 1992 – The "Black Aces"
- 1994 – Four P-51 Mustangs, led by Chuck Yeager
- 1995 – B-17 Flying Fortress, led by Chuck Yeager
- 1996 – Four F/A-18 Hornets (Marine Aircraft Group 31)
- 1997 – Stealth Bomber
- 1999 – Stealth Bomber & four F-14 Tomcats
- 2000 – Two AV-8B Harrier IIs
- 2001 – Four F-16s, "The Racers" (181st Fighter Wing, Indiana Air National Guard)
- 2002 – Stealth Bomber "Spirit of Washington" (509th Bomb Wing, Whiteman Air Force Base)
- 2003 – Stealth Bomber "Spirit of Indiana" (509th Bomb Wing, Whiteman Air Force Base)
- 2004 – Four F-16s, "The Black Snakes" (122d Fighter Wing, Air National Guard)
- 2005 – Stealth Bomber
- 2006 – Historic Aircraft & four F-16s
- 2007 – Four F-22 Raptors (Langley AFB)
- 2008 – Two F-16 Vipers & two F/A-18 Hornets (Naval Strike and Air Warfare Center)
- 2009 – Two World War II B-25 Mitchell bombers
- 2010 – Four F/A-18 Hornets (Naval Strike and Air Warfare Center)
- 2011 – B-2 Spirit stealth bomber "Spirit of Nebraska" (509th Bomb Wing, Whiteman Air Force Base)
  - Post-race – Four F/A-18E Super Hornets
- 2012 – A-10 Thunderbolt "Warthog", F-16 Fighting Falcon, two P-51 Mustangs.
- 2013 – One World War II North American B-25 Mitchell "Axis Nightmare" (Tri-State Warbird Museum) and five North American T-6 Texan trainer aircraft
- 2014 – Black Diamond Jet Team
- 2015 – Two A-10s
- 2016 – Douglas SBD-5 Dauntless and a P-51 Mustang; both aircraft are from the Commemorative Air Force. Also, two F/A-18E Super Hornets from VFA-81 and two EA-18G Growlers from VAQ-139.
- 2017 – B-52 Bomber (69th Bomb Squadron)
- 2018 - Stealth Bomber
- 2019 - Four helicopters; followed by USAF Heritage Flight (F-16 Fighting Falcon, A-10 Thunderbolt II, P-51 Mustang, P-40 Warhawk)
- 2020 - United States Air Force Thunderbirds
- 2021 - United States Air Force F-16 Vipers from the 187th Fighter Wing at Montgomery Air National Guard Base
- 2022 - United States Air Force Thunderbirds
- 2023 - United States Air Force F-16 Vipers from the 49th Wing at Holloman Air Force Base
- 2024 - United States Air Force Thunderbirds
- 2025 - United States Air Force South Dakota Air National Guard F-16 Vipers from the 175th Fighter Squadron at Joe Foss Field Air National Guard Station
- 2026 - United States Air Force South Dakota Air National Guard F-16 Vipers from the 175th Fighter Squadron at Joe Foss Field Air National Guard Station

=== "Back Home Again in Indiana" ===
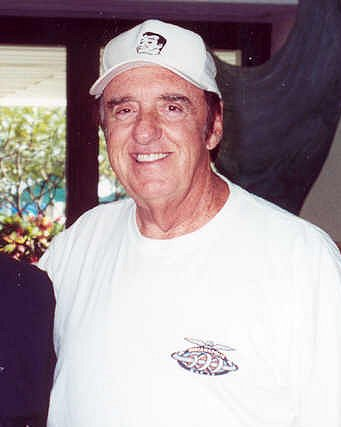
Jim Nabors at the 2000 Indianapolis 500

The most traditional performance is the singing of the chorus of "Back Home Again in Indiana". This tradition has accompanied the race since 1946. Jim Nabors, accompanied by the Purdue Marching Band, notably performed the song in most years from 1972 to 2014. The song has long been the last event in the order of the day, immediately preceding the command to start engines.

During the song, thousands of multicolored balloons are released from an infield tent. The balloon release dates back to 1947, and has coincided with the song since about 1950 until 2020 when the practice was halted citing environmental concerns. The song, which was first published in 1917, is reported to have been first played at the race in 1919. A track side brass band played the song as Indiana-born Howdy Wilcox was finishing the final laps to victory.

In 1955, Dinah Shore became the only woman to perform this song during the race. In 1986, the race was rained out on Sunday and Monday, and subsequently postponed until the following Saturday. Robert McFarland of the Metropolitan Opera, who had performed the national anthem in two previous years, was scheduled to sing the song. However, due to the rain delay he was unable to return. John S. Davies, the Artist-in-residence of the Indianapolis Opera was brought in as a replacement.

In 1997, the race was rained out on Sunday, and the start was rescheduled for Monday. Nabors (as well as the Purdue band), had left the grounds by Monday morning. Rather than find a last-minute replacement, Nabors suggested that the Speedway utilize a recording of one of his previous performances. The Speedway replayed his 1993 rendition, and it was well received by the fans. Two days before the 2007 race, Nabors canceled his appearance due to an illness. On race morning, Nabors recorded a special video greeting to the fans from his Hawaii home, which was streamed over the Internet. Fans were invited to sing along with the Purdue band, and a "get well soon" message was displayed for Nabors. In 2008, Nabors made a well-received return, and received a standing ovation at the public driver meeting.

Nabors again missed the race in 2012 due to an illness. This time, the Speedway sent a film crew to his home in Hawaii, and recorded a performance on video that was played on the video boards on race morning. In March 2014, Nabors announced that the 2014 race would be his final performance. In 2017, Jim Cornelison was invited to sing, and his performance was critically praised. He has repeated his performance every year since then.

- 1946 – James Melton
- 1947 – James Melton
- 1948 – James Melton
- 1949 – Frank Parish
- 1950 – James Melton
- 1951 – Frank Parish
- 1952 – Morton Downey Sr.
- 1953 – Morton Downey Sr.
- 1954 – James Melton
- 1955 – Dinah Shore
- 1956 – Brian Sullivan
- 1957 – Jerome Hines & Purdue Band
- 1958 – Brian Sullivan
- 1959 – Purdue University Glee Club
- 1960 – Dennis Morgan
- 1961 – Mel Tormé
- 1962 – C. David Cochard (Purdue Varsity Glee Club)
- 1963 – Brian Sullivan
- 1964 – Vic Damone
- 1965 – Johnny Desmond
- 1966 – Ed Ames
- 1967 – Russell J. Wunderlich (Purdue Varsity Glee Club)
- 1968 – Richard O. Plothow (Purdue Varsity Glee Club)
- 1969 – Mack H. Shultz (Purdue Varsity Glee Club)
- 1970 – Saverio Saridis
- 1971 – Peter DePaolo
- 1972 – Jim Nabors
- 1973 – Jim Nabors
- 1974 – Jim Nabors
- 1975 – Jim Nabors
- 1976 – Jim Nabors
- 1977 – Jim Nabors
- 1978 – Jim Nabors
- 1979 – Peter Marshall
- 1980 – Dr. Richard Smith (Purdue Varsity Glee Club)
- 1981 – Phil Harris
- 1982 – Louis Sudler (Chicago Civic Opera)
- 1983 – Jim Nabors
- 1984 – Jim Nabors
- 1985 – Walt Disney World Voices of Liberty, conducted by Mickey Mouse
- 1986 – John S. Davies & the 74th Army Band of Fort Benjamin Harrison
- 1987 – Jim Nabors
- 1988 – Jim Nabors
- 1989 – Jim Nabors
- 1990 – Jim Nabors
- 1991 – Jim Nabors
- 1992 – Jim Nabors
- 1993 – Jim Nabors
- 1994 – Jim Nabors
- 1995 – Jim Nabors
- 1996 – Jim Nabors
- 1997 – Jim Nabors (via recording)
- 1998 – Jim Nabors
- 1999 – Jim Nabors
- 2000 – Jim Nabors
- 2001 – Jim Nabors
- 2002 – Jim Nabors
- 2003 – Jim Nabors
- 2004 – Jim Nabors
- 2005 – Jim Nabors
- 2006 – Jim Nabors
- 2007 – 300,000 race fans and Purdue Band
- 2008 – Jim Nabors
- 2009 – Jim Nabors
- 2010 – Jim Nabors
- 2011 – Jim Nabors
- 2012 – Jim Nabors (via videotape from Hawaii)
- 2013 – Jim Nabors
- 2014 – Jim Nabors
- 2015 – Straight No Chaser
- 2016 – Josh Kaufman & Indianapolis Children's Choir
- 2017 – Jim Cornelison
- 2018 – Jim Cornelison
- 2019 – Jim Cornelison
- 2020 – Jim Cornelison
- 2021 – Jim Cornelison
- 2022 – Jim Cornelison
- 2023 – Jim Cornelison
- 2024 – Jim Cornelison
- 2025 – Jim Cornelison
- 2026 – Jim Cornelison

=== Starting command ===
The call for the engines to start has been traditionally made by stating "Gentlemen, start your engines!" When female drivers have competed, the call has been amended to "Lady and gentlemen..." or "Ladies and gentlemen, start your engines". In 2017, 2018 and 2020, the command was recited as "Drivers, start your engines". In 2019 it returned to "Lady and gentlemen..". Unlike other races, the starting command was not recited by the grand marshal. The starting command is customarily recited by a ranking member of the Indianapolis Motor Speedway board of directors. From 1955 to 2019, the starting command was recited by a member of the Hulman-George family. Since 2020, the starting command was recited by Roger Penske.

The exact origin of the phrase is unclear, and there have been several conflicting accounts of who was the first to recite it, and what the exact wording of it was. Prior to World War II, it was commonplace for an aerial bomb to signal the start of the engines. Seth Kline was the official starter of the "500" in 1925–1926 & 1934–1953. Kline is thought to have made an informal "Gentlemen, start your motors!" command as early as 1948 to accompany the bomb. The first documented case was in 1950, and that was recited by prolific public address announcer John Francis "Irish" Horan. Kline was again reported as saying it in 1951, (though some report it was Horan) Either Kline or Horan said it again in 1952. It was around that time the command was changed from "...motors!" to "...engines!" The participants and officials alike, preferred the more technical term "engines" to describe their machines. Sid Collins stated that chief steward Harlan Fengler explained to him, "There are no motors in the race, just engines."

Wilbur Shaw, president of the Speedway in 1946–1954, was once believed to be the person who coined the phrase, and it was erroneously claimed in his autobiography that he recited it in all the post-World War II years until his death. Speedway historian Donald Davidson, however, believes Shaw only recited it twice, in 1953 and 1954.

After Shaw's death, Tony Hulman started reciting the command, and made it popular and famous. The normally soft-spoken and shy Hulman had a proud and vociferous version of the command annually. Hulman would rehearse the line, perfecting it for show, and was even known to work with radio broadcaster Luke Walton to draft cue cards to know when to stress certain words and syllables. After Hulman's death in 1977, his widow Mary F. Hulman took over the honor, followed by their daughter Mari George.

In 1977, Janet Guthrie became the first female driver to qualify for the Indy 500. Controversy surrounded the command, because the Speedway management did not want to alter the traditional phrase. During the week before the race, the management announced that they would not change the wording of the command. Looking for an excuse, they insisted that the cars were actually started by male crew members with an electric hand-held starter from behind the car. Guthrie and her crew were quite displeased by the stubbornness of the Speedway management, considering her unprecedented accomplishment. The crew reacted by assigning Kay Bignotti (wife of George Bignotti) as the crew member to operate the inertial starter at the back of Guthrie's car. The Speedway's argument fell apart, and they decided upon a special amended command for that year. They did not announce beforehand what the special command would be, and Hulman's highly anticipated phrase was the following:

In company with the first lady ever to qualify at Indianapolis, gentlemen, start your engines.

In 1978–1979, when Guthrie again qualified for the race, the command was simply amended to "Lady and gentlemen, start your engines." In 1992, Lyn St. James became the second female to qualify for the race. She publicly requested, albeit not contentiously, that the command be changed to "Drivers, start your engines." The request was dismissed, and the command used was the now customary "Lady and gentlemen..." variation. That variation, along with "Ladies and gentlemen..." were used many times over the next two decades. In 2017, Pippa Mann was the lone female driver in the field, and Tony George gave the command as "Drivers, start your engines." This was the first time that this variation of the command was used for the race.

For many years, the traditional location for giving the command was at the pace car in the front of the starting grid. Public address announcer Jim Philippe normally introduced the command, describing it as the "traditional command" or the "famous four words". Phillippe's final 500 was 2003. Likewise, for many years through 1989, Luke Walton traditionally introduced the command on the radio network broadcast. Since 2004, current public address announcer Dave Calabro introduces the command normally by calling it the "most famous words in motorsports".

In most cases, Tony Hulman would give the command, then ride in the pace car during the pace laps. Mary F. Hulman would give the command near the pace car, but rarely rode in the pace car due to her age and declining health. Eventually, the location was moved to near the start/finish line, and in 2001, it was moved to the new Victory Podium stage adjacent to the Pagoda. In 2011 only, Mari George moved back to the front of the starting grid to give the command, and then she rode in the pace car with A. J. Foyt. In 2014, as a special gesture to Jim Nabors's final performance at Indy, the starting command was given in unison by both Mari George and Nabors, marking the first time a non-member of the Hulman-George family had given the command for the 500 since 1954. In 2016 for the 100th Indianapolis 500, now-matriarch Mari was joined by three subsequent generations of the Hulman-George family, who gave the command together. Due to her advanced age, the 2016 race would be Mari's final turn giving the command. Later that same year, Tony George gave the starting command for the Brickyard 400, his first time giving a command since a restart command in 1986. For the 2017 Indianapolis 500, the duty was permanently assigned to Tony George. In that year, Tony George began using the phrase "Drivers, start your engines" instead of the more familiar "Lady and gentlemen..". variation. However, for the 2019 race, George recited that latter variation.

Roger Penske, who purchased the Speedway from the Hulman-George family in November 2019, gave the starting command for the 2020 Indianapolis 500.

Years	Starting command	Notes
1948–1952	Seth Klein or John Francis "Irish" Horan	(unconfirmed)
1953–1954	Wilbur Shaw	
1955–1977	Tony Hulman	Restart commands by Tony Hulman in 1967, 1973
1978–1980	Mary F. Hulman	
1981	Mari Hulman George	
1982–1996	Mary F. Hulman	Restart command by Tom Carnegie in 1982; Restart command by Tony George in 1986
1997–2013	Mari Hulman George	Restart command by Mari Hulman George in 1997; Restart command by Tom Carnegie in 2004
2014	Mari Hulman George & Jim Nabors	
2015	Mari Hulman George	
2016	Four generations of the Hulman-George family	(including Mari George and Tony George)
2017–2019	Tony George	
2020–2026	Roger Penske	

On occasions when an accident or rain has halted the race, a second command has typically been given. Years include: 1967, 1973, 1982, 1986, 1997, 2004, 2007. The amended command, "gentlemen, re-start your engines," has usually been used. In 1986, this restart command was given by Tony George. In 1997, it was given by Mari Hulman George. In 1982 and 2004 the command was given by public address announcer Tom Carnegie.

In 1981, Mary F. Hulman was unable to recite the starting command due to an illness. In that year, Mari George recited, her first time performing the honor.

Over the years, the starting command has been adopted to start all sorts of auto racing in the United States, including but not limited to NASCAR. However, in many venues outside of Indy, the phrase "Drivers, start your engines" appears to be the preferred version.

=== Honorary starter ===
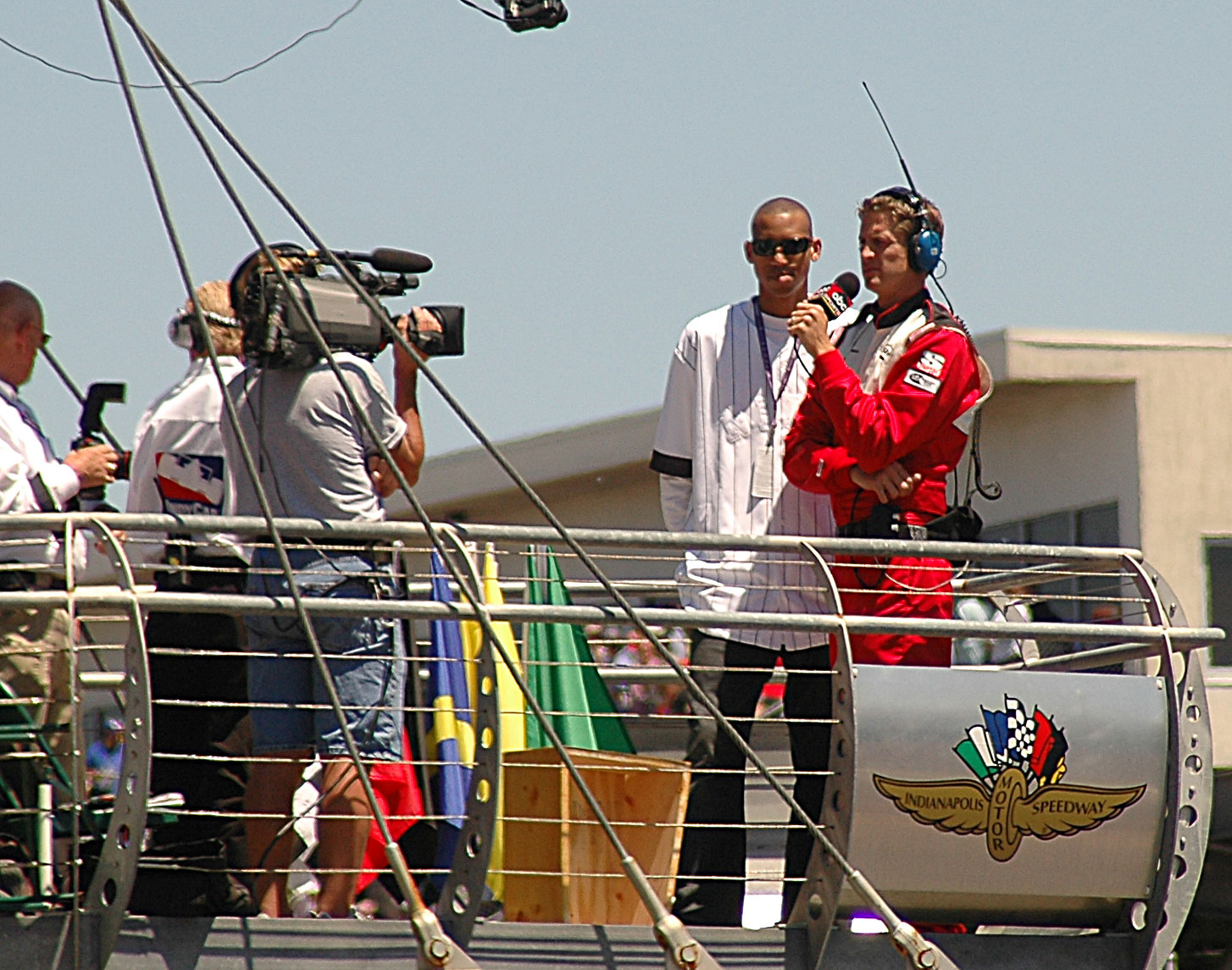
Reggie Miller in the starter's stand in 2005

A recently added tradition is the use of an honorary starter. A special guest has been invited in recent years to wave the green flag to start the race. Starting in 2013, the tradition was expanded where another celebrity or special guest(s) arrives on race morning by helicopter to ceremoniously deliver the green flag or the checkered flag. The official starter (or "flagman"), however, is a trained race official, and handles the remainder of the flagging duties during the race. In 2010, due to two early caution periods, honorary starter Jack Nicholson elected to stay in the starter's perch for an additional few minutes, and was able to drop the green for the two subsequent restarts as well.

- 1993: Nick Fornoro (retired CART starter, retired at the end of the 1992 CART season)
- 1996: Robert James Eaton (Chairman and CEO of Chrysler Corporation)
- 1997: General Ronald Fogleman (Chief of Staff of the United States Air Force)
- 1998: Mark Page (Sr. VP of Store Operations for Pep Boys, IndyCar Series sponsor)
- 1999: Jim Postl (President and CEO of Pennzoil)
- 2000: Howard Katz (President of ABC Sports)
- 2004: Nick Lachey
- 2005: Reggie Miller
- 2006: Sugar Ray Leonard
- 2007: Peyton Manning
- 2008: Kristi Yamaguchi
- 2009: Allen Sirkin (COO of Phillips-Van Heusen, IndyCar Series Sponsor)
- 2010: Jack Nicholson
- 2011: Bruce P. Crandall (Medal of Honor recipient)
- 2012: Indiana Governor Mitch Daniels
- 2013: Michael Peña (promoting the film Turbo)
  - Green flag delivered by Chuck Pagano and Riley Hospital patient Willie Avila
- 2014: Mark Cuban
  - Green flag delivered by Andrew Luck and Riley Hospital patients MaKenzi Rooksberry and Johliel Austin
- 2015: Patrick Dempsey
  - Green flag delivered by Paul George, Pat McAfee, and Riley Hospital patient Tori Gwyn
- 2016: Chris Pine
  - Green flag delivered by workers from IU Health University Hospital
- 2017: Jake Gyllenhaal & Jeff Bauman
  - Green flag delivered by Nathan Kress and workers from IU Health University Hospital
  - Checkered flags delivery by the 101st Airborne Division ("Screaming Eagles")
- 2018: Chris Hemsworth
  - Green flag delivered by deadmau5, after being transported by Governor Eric Holcomb via non-stop flight from Paris
- 2019: Christian Bale & Matt Damon
  - Green flag delivered by EMS first responder and former Riley Hospital patient Trey Edens
- 2020: Dan Towriss (CEO of Gainbridge)
- 2021: Milo Ventimiglia
  - Green flag delivered by workers from IU Health University Hospital
- 2023: Adam Driver
  - Green flag delivered by IU Health University Hospital trauma patient Bailey Rogers
- 2024: Austin Butler & Jodie Comer
  - Green flag delivered by IU Health University Hospital trauma patient Hanna Long
- 2025: Casey Foyt
  - Green flag delivered by IU Health University Hospital trauma patient Chris Arvin
- 2026: Brendan Fraser

=== Celebrity guests ===
Since the early years of the race, celebrities from all walks of fame have been invited to the race, some have returned for many years or even decades. Television and movie stars, recording artists, sports figures, politicians, and military, are among the many dignitaries invited. During the pre-race, a parade of stars is conducted around the track, usually in convertibles. In numerous years, celebrities have been invited to drive the pace car at the start of the race.

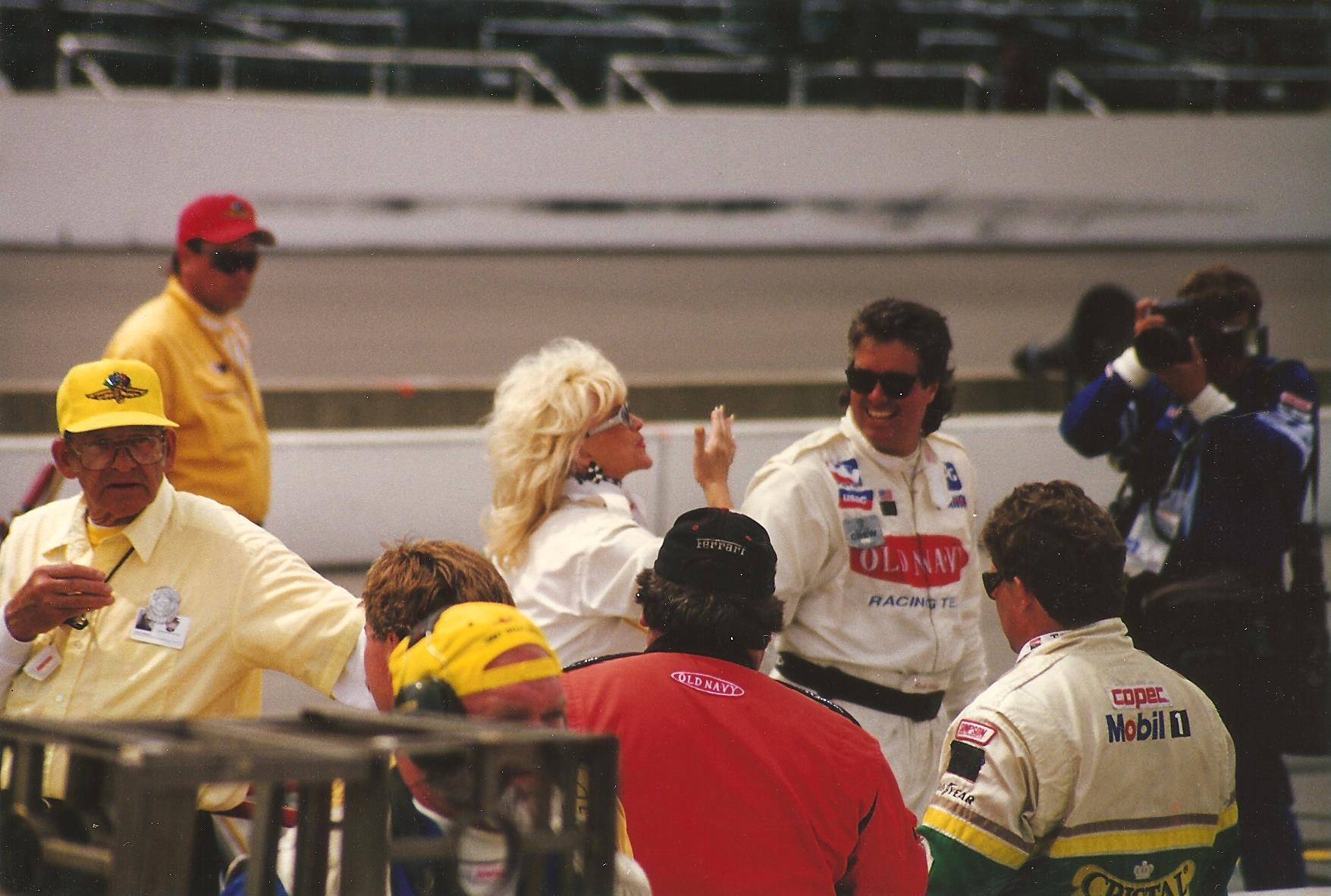
Linda Vaughn at the 1997 Indianapolis 500

Clark Gable is seen in a famous photograph of the 1947 race. Among the many celebrities who attended or have attended multiple Indy 500s include Jim Nabors, James Garner (who drove the pace car in 1975, 1977 and 1985), David Letterman, Tim Allen, Florence Henderson, Linda Vaughn, and many others. Paul Newman, who starred in the Indy-related film Winning, attended the race many times, and in 1983–1995, and then again in 2008, was at the race as co-owner of Newman/Haas Racing. Joyce DeWitt, who grew up in the Town of Speedway, and graduated from Speedway Senior High School, once worked at the Indianapolis Motor Speedway ticket office. Numerous celebrities have attended the race as a co-investor or ambassador of a team, such as Joe Montana, Walter Payton, and Jim Harbaugh.

At least three former U.S. presidents (and one future president) have attended the Indianapolis 500. Following his presidency, Gerald Ford attended the 1979 race, serving also as the grand marshal of the 500 Festival Parade. After their presidencies, both George H. W. Bush and Bill Clinton attended the 2003 race, the first time in Indy history that two former presidents were at the same race. It was the elder Bush's second visit to the Speedway; he previously presided over the opening ceremonies of the 1987 Pan American Games, which was held at the track. Future president Donald Trump attended the race in 2002. Trump was selected to drive the pace car for the 2011 race, but withdrew the duty after drawing controversy from fans. In 1971, tentative plans were made for sitting president Richard Nixon to attend the race, as part of the NATO Conference on Urban Affairs that was being held in the city. Nixon was even rumored to be giving the starting command. Nixon would have been the first, and only to-date, sitting president to attend the race. However, the visit was later cancelled.

At least two presidential candidates have visited the Speedway during their respective election campaigns, owning much to the fact that the Indiana primary is usually held in May. Ronald Reagan visited the track during the month of May 1976, while he was in town campaigning for the 1976 Indiana Republican primary. Likewise, Hillary Clinton visited the track while campaigning for the 2008 Indiana primary and met with driver Sarah Fisher.

At least four former vice presidents have attended the race. The aforementioned Gerald Ford, George H. W. Bush, and Indiana natives Dan Quayle and Mike Pence. Quayle has attended the race numerous times, including three times as sitting vice president (1989–1991). Pence has reportedly attended the race over thirty times, most recently in 2016, while he was the sitting governor of Indiana and again in 2017 while he was sitting vice president. In 2018, Pence visited the track during practice, but not on race day.

David Letterman worked as a reporter for ABC Sports during the 1971 race, and attended the race many times as a spectator. Since 2002, he has attended the race as co-owner of Rahal Letterman Racing. The team won the race in 2004 and 2020. At the 2015 race, Letterman was honored on the famous scoring pylon during the pre-race; just four days after he retired from the Late Show.

During the 1960s and early 1970s, several NASA astronauts from the Mercury and Apollo programs were among invited guests.

== Race ==
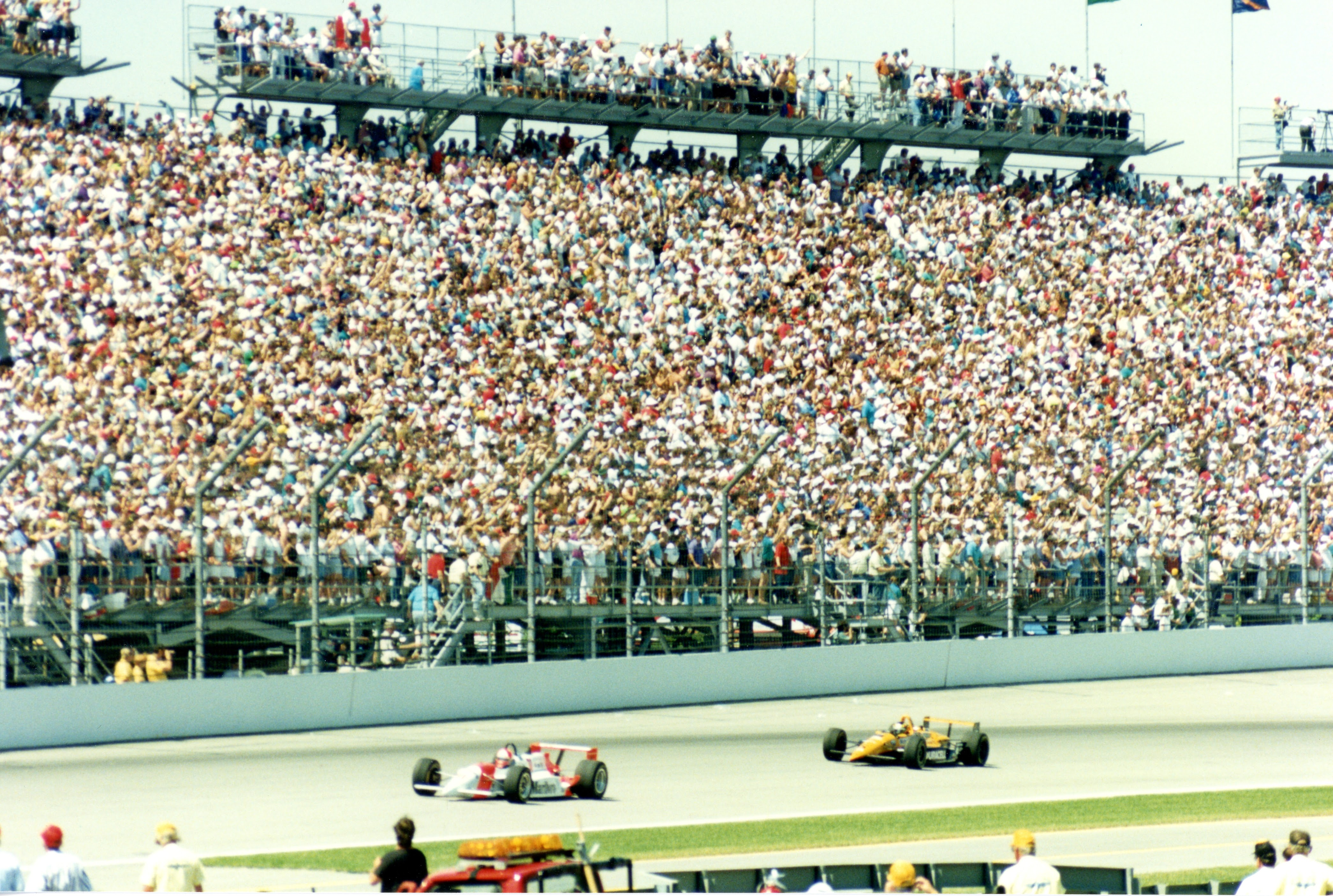
Indianapolis 500, 1994

- For the entire history of the 500 mile race, the official winner of the race has been defined as the driver who completes the 500 mile distance first, sans penalties. A winner is declared with a finishing time in hours, minutes, and seconds. Finishers behind the winner were given additional time – upwards of an hour in early years – to complete the 500 mile distance. In very early years, completing the full 500 miles was a requirement to receive prize money. In 1912, Ralph Mulford famously took nearly nine hours (over 2 1/2 hours after the winner) to complete the race and earn the 10th place prize money. Later, it was because completing the 500 mile distance at an average speed of over 100 mph earned a driver a spot in the prestigious Champion Spark Plug 100 mph Club. In 1964 as live television arrived, this "extra time" was reduced to about five minutes, and after 1974, when raucous fans ran out on the track at the checkered flag, extra time was eliminated. 1975 was the first year in which the lap the winner finishes the race is the final lap for all competitors. In 1966, Gordon Johncock was said to have completed the 500 miles in lesser elapsed time than winner Graham Hill. However, Johncock had suffered minor damage during the first lap accident, and restarted the race in the pit lane due to the crew changing the nose cone. USAC officials did not score his first lap out of the pit lane, and he effectively ran all day carrying a one lap penalty to the field.
- The cars begin the race in a rolling start, traditionally in eleven rows of three, for a field of 33 total cars. Most other automobile races have two cars per row. The 33-car field derives from a 1919 AAA mandate of one car for every 400 feet (120 m) of track. Early races, however, saw varying numbers of starters, from as low as 21, to as high as 42. The number of cars in each row also varied, with as many as five abreast. Since 1933 there have only been the following exceptions to having a field of 33 racers:
  - In 1941, 33 cars initially qualified for the field during time trials. Sam Hanks was injured in a practice crash the day before the race and withdrew. Then on the morning of the race, George Barringer's car was destroyed in a fire that swept through the garage area, thus only 31 cars lined up to start the race.
  - In 1947, only 30 cars qualified. A boycott over the purse led to the smaller field.
  - In 1979, after a rules dispute over turbocharger inlets, and after controversy regarding the refusal of some entries from members of the CART series, a special fifth day of qualifying was added. However, only two cars ran sufficient speeds to be added to the field, and 35 cars lined up to start the race. Heavy attrition early on saw one car fail to complete a lap, and 7 cars out by lap 22.
  - In 1997, which used an "all exempt tour" concept similar to the PGA Tour since 1983, the top 25 teams headed in Indy Racing League team entry points standings earned exemptions into the field, with the top nine non-exempt cars making the race on speed. Some exempt teams bumped out other non-exempt cars that had actually qualified with faster speeds, but their teams were not in the top 25 of League points. Two bumped cars were restored to the field to ensure that the "33 fastest entries" were part of the field, for a total of 35 starters. Ironically on the pace lap, three cars crashed out together, while two suffered mechanical problems, and only 30 cars took the green flag. (A similar rule was used at the Crown Royal presents the Your Hero's Name Here 400 from 2005 to 2012 and the Lilly Diabetes 250 from 2012 to 2014. Both were NASCAR races which guaranteed a position for the top 35 drivers in the owners standings in the Sprint Cup Series and top 30 drivers for the Xfinity Series.)

"I always get a happy moment if I see the sunshine on race day, you know I think that's the happiest kind of a moment I ever have. Then I think when it's overcast I'm not quite so happy. Then when it rains, why I would just assume crawl under the bed and stay there."

— Tony Hulman, discussing his preferences for weather on race day.
- Tom Carnegie announced on June 9, 2006, that the previous month's race, would be his last as official chief track announcer. Having called the race since 1946 on the public address system, he is best known for his lines, "He's/She's on it!" (signaling the start of a qualifying attempt), "It's a new track record!" (when a driver surpasses either a one- or four-lap track record in qualifications), and "He's slowing down on the backstretch!" or "Andretti is slowing down!" (The latter for the Andretti family's historical misfortune at Indianapolis.). Carnegie was also known for opening each day in May when the track was open to the public with the words, "Good morning, race fans!" After Carnegie's retirement, Dave Calabro, sports director of Indianapolis' NBC affiliate WTHR, became the second chief PA announcer in the Hulman-George era for the 2007 race and ever since.
- With the race scheduled for the month of May, the on-track activities are often at the mercy of midwestern springtime rain showers. Numerous practice days, qualifying days, and race days, over the years have been halted, delayed or washed out due to inclement weather. Since the cars can not race on a wet or damp course, rainy weather (and even rainy forecasts) are often despised by fans and competitors. Track owner Tony Hulman was said to have loathed rainy weather at the track, quipping that if he woke up on race day to rainy weather he "would just assume crawl under the bed and stay there". Days at the track that feature plentiful sunshine, warm, pleasant temperatures, and no precipitation, are said to be experiencing "Tony Hulman weather".

== Post-race ==
=== Victory Lane ===
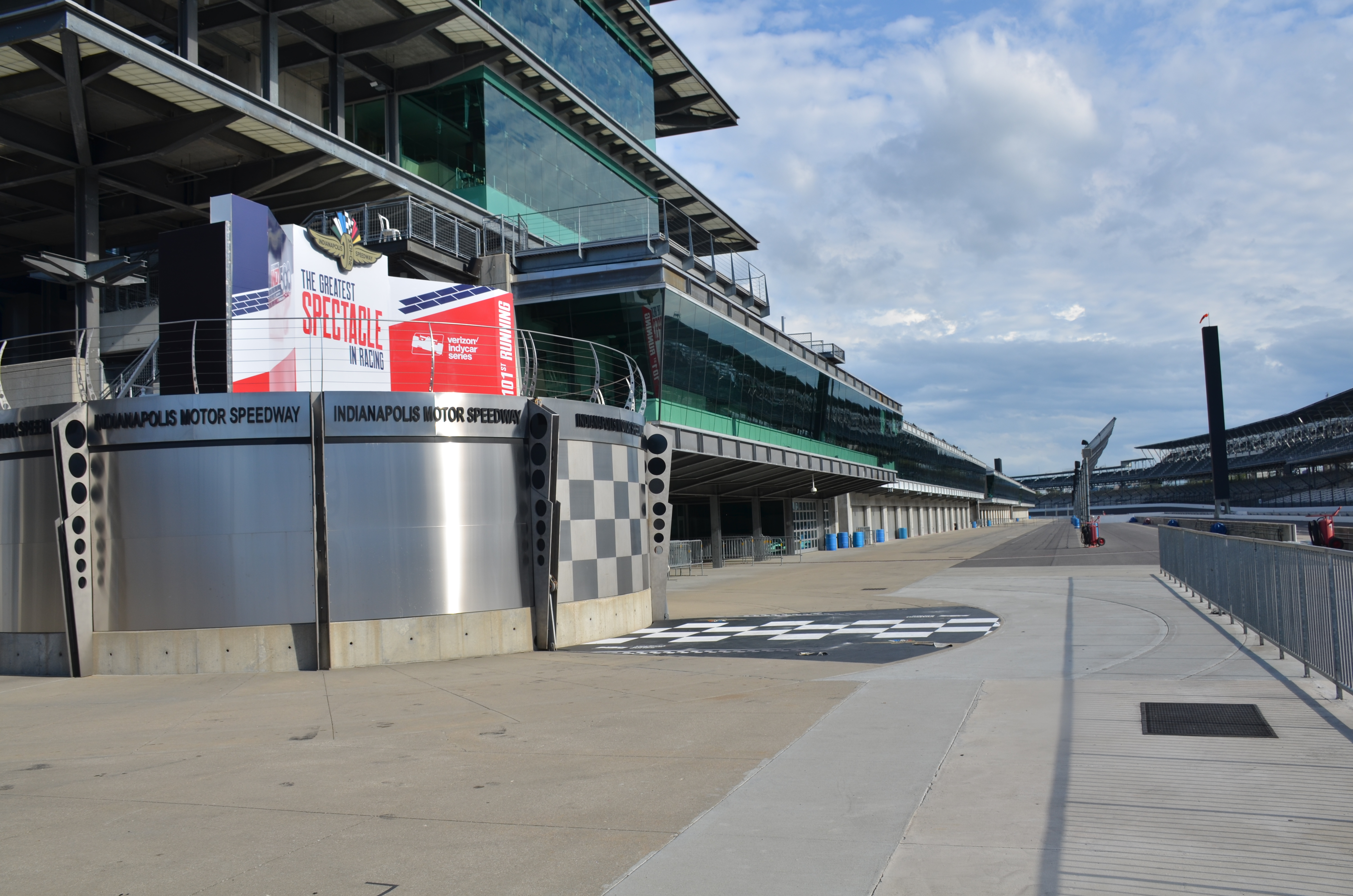
Victory Lane at the Indianapolis Motor Speedway.

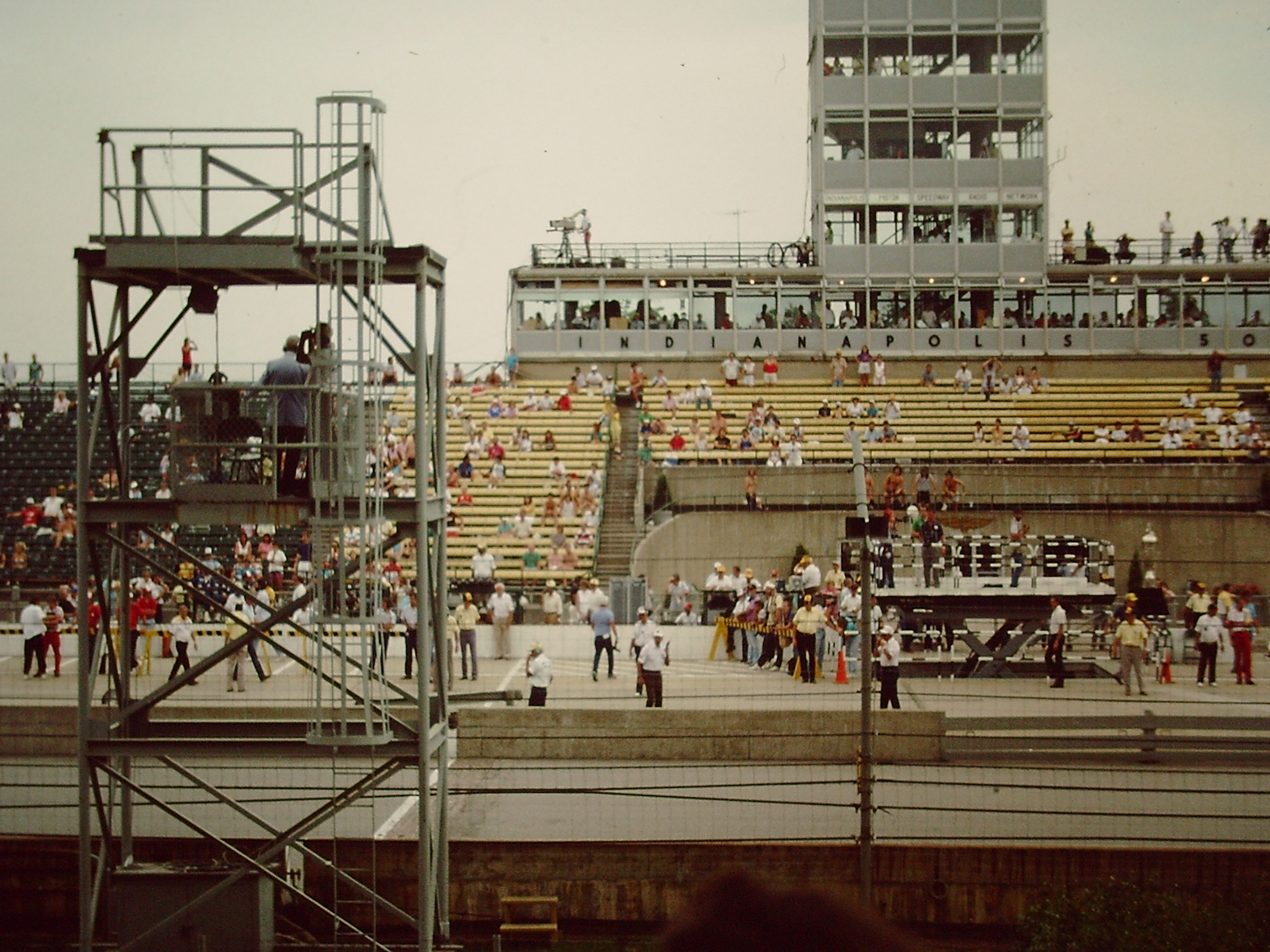
Victory lane platform used from 1986 to 1993.

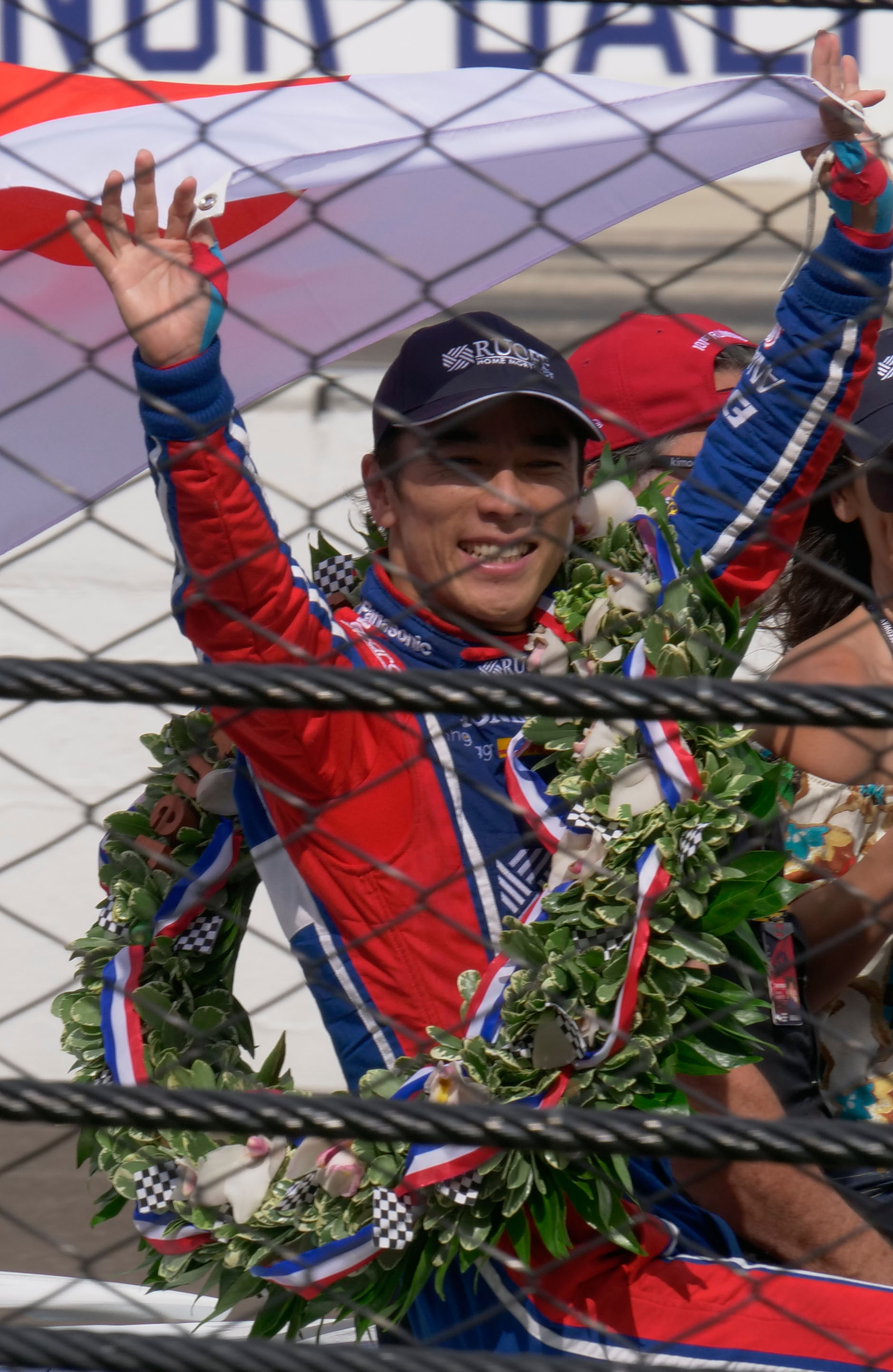
2017 Indy 500 winner Takuma Sato celebrates his victory.

Immediately after taking the checkered flag, the race winner drives to Victory Lane. The celebration to honor the winner begins with the car being wheeled onto a black and white checkered periphery. The driver is presented with the Borg-Warner Trophy, which is situated behind the car in a prominent location. A floral wreath (containing 33 lilies to commemorate the 33 drivers of the field) is placed around the winners neck, and the winner is presented with the traditional bottle of milk for refreshment. Interviews are taken for television, radio, and over the public address system. The driver's crew and team owner(s) also are invited to celebrate in victory lane, and are joined by numerous dignitaries, including the 500 Festival Queen and Princesses court, track and series personalities, celebrities, and various sponsor representatives. The Indianapolis 500 notably does not utilize a podium for the top-three finishers as is customary in other forms of racing, as well as at most other IndyCar events. Only the winning driver and team participate in victory lane celebrations, believed to be an homage to horse racing's Winner's Circle.

In the early years, victory lane was located at the far south end of the pit area, near the entrance to Turn One. For many years, it was identified by a large black and white checkered carpet. This location was used through 1970. In 1971, victory lane was moved to the horseshoe area located in front of the Master Control Tower. The car would be rolled up two checkered ramps, to a raised platform a few feet above the ground. In 1986, a new victory lane was constructed, which was a hydraulic lift in the pit lane. In 1994, after the pit lane was reconstructed, victory lane was moved back to the horseshoe area, this time on a large cylindrical platform.

The current victory lane is located beneath the Victory Podium stage, adjacent to the Pagoda. The podium was originally built in 2000 for the U.S. Grand Prix to serve as a 1st-2nd-3rd podium for that event and later MotoGP, SCCA, and USAC events, but is not used as a podium for either the Indy 500 or the Brickyard 400. Instead it has been utilized as a stage for pre-race ceremonies. In 2020, as part of capital improvements by the new Penske ownership, the podium was upgraded to include a new hoist to lift the winning car on top of the victory podium platform stage, a throwback to the 1986–1998 version of victory lane.

=== Bottle of milk ===
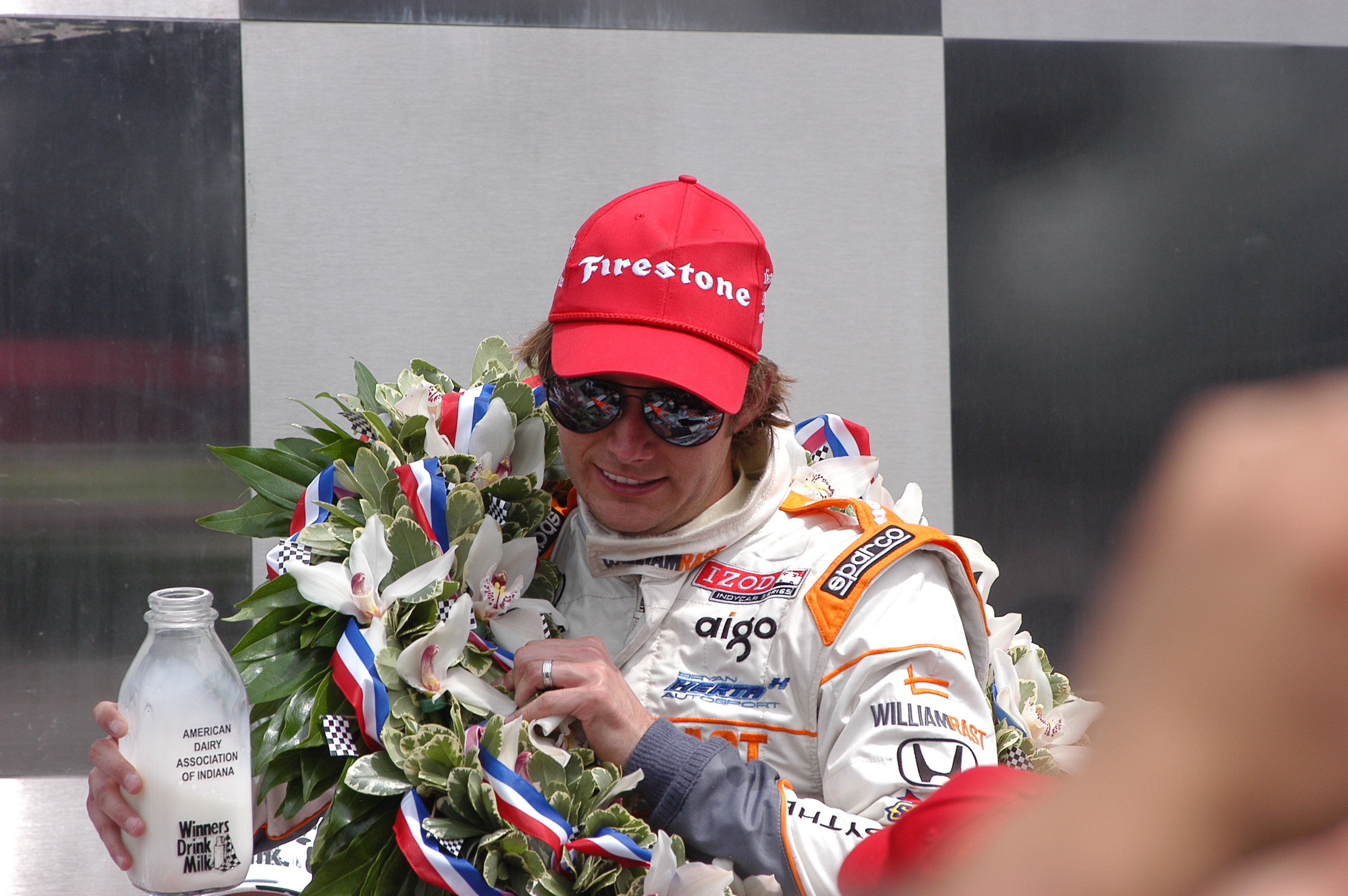
Dan Wheldon in Victory Lane with the bottle of milk

A long-standing tradition of the Indianapolis 500 is for the winner to drink a bottle of milk immediately after the race. This tradition dates back to 1936 after victor Louis Meyer asked for a glass of buttermilk, something his mother had encouraged him to drink on hot days. Meyer also reportedly drank milk after his victory in 1933, as did a few others in the immediate years afterward. The young tradition quickly went away, and for a time after World War II, was replaced by "Water From Wilbur" – a silver jug (resembling an ice bucket) filled with icy-cold water, presented by then-Speedway president, and three-time former winner Wilbur Shaw.

By 1956, the milk returned as a ritual as milk companies became sponsors of the race purse and handed a bottle of milk to the winner to promote their product. A sponsorship of currently $10,000 now paid out by the American Dairy Association if the winner sips the milk in victory lane. In 1993, Emerson Fittipaldi drank orange juice instead of milk after his victory. The snub drew considerable ire from fans. Later he took a sip of milk, at the urging of his car owner Roger Penske. Fittipaldi owned citrus farms in Brazil and wished to promote his industry. As a result, he was booed in driver's introductions the following week by the crowd in Milwaukee, Wisconsin, in the heart of "America's Dairyland". In 1981, Bobby Unser also did not drink the milk in victory lane. After Unser was tentatively stripped of his victory, Mario Andretti sipped from a bottle of milk the next morning during the traditional photo shoot.

Drivers are allowed to choose what type of milk they want to receive, and the publication of the "milk list" is a popular event amongst fans. For the 2019 running of the 500, 21 drivers (including winner Simon Pagenaud) picked whole milk, 10 opted for 2 percent, Marcus Ericsson selected fat-free and defending champion Will Power did not list a preference. Several modern drivers, most notably Ed Carpenter and James Hinchcliffe, have said they want to drink buttermilk if they were to win out of respect for Louis Meyer's original tradition.

Since the early 2000s, it has become increasingly common for winning drivers to pour some or all of the milk over their heads after drinking (in apparent emulation of champagne-spilling celebrations traditional at other races).

=== Borg-Warner Trophy ===
A bas-relief sculpture of the winner's face, along with his name, average speed, and date of victory is added to the Borg-Warner Trophy. The trophy has been in use since 1936. A smaller replica of this trophy has been officially presented to the winner after the race since 1988 and team principal since 1997, usually in a press conference either at the Speedway or in Detroit at the North American International Auto Show at the BorgWarner exhibit, except for the 2011 race because of extenuating circumstances (the winning driver had died in a crash at an aborted INDYCAR race; the winning team principal and the driver's widow were presented with the respective trophies in the ensuing January). Prior to that, winners received a replica mounted on a chestnut plaque.

=== Other celebrations ===
- The Gordon Pipers bagpipes marching band has performed traditionally at the Indianapolis 500 since 1962. The band marches and performs during the 500 Festival Parade, during pre-race ceremonies, and plays while the winner is being wheeled into victory lane.
- Celebratory burnouts or "donuts," while not specifically prohibited by the rules, are generally discouraged and frowned upon at the Indianapolis 500. Burnouts in IndyCar racing in general are often prohibited by the teams themselves, as they potentially inflict damage on the engines, which are subject to strict mileage usage and rebuild intervals.
- Impromptu celebrations at locations other than the formal victory lane area are also discouraged, and sometimes are considered a breach of tradition. The lone allowable exception in the past many years has been Hélio Castroneves, who made a signature of climbing the catchfence after his victories. In 2016, Alexander Rossi ran out of fuel on his cool down lap, and his car coasted to a halt out on the track. He then sprang from his car to wave to fans in turn four. He was quickly towed to victory lane, and the formal celebrations began as normal. In 2019, winner Simon Pagenaud stopped at the start/finish line and climbed out of his car, which resulted in some mild criticism. Before the impromptu celebration escalated, officials coaxed him back into the car and pushed the car through a gate opening to the traditional victory lane. In both 2023 and 2024, Josef Newgarden sprung from his car, and climbed through an opening in the catch fence to greet spectators in the grandstands.
- At some point after the victory lane celebration, the winner is whisked away and rides for a lap around the track in the pace car to salute the fans.
- The tradition of the winning driver and crew kissing the yard of bricks that mark the start/finish, started by Dale Jarrett at the 1996 Brickyard 400, appears to have carried over to the Indy 500, starting with Gil de Ferran in 2003.

=== Selected awards ===
- Pace car: The race winner has been awarded one of the pace cars, or a replica, almost every year since 1936. In 1941, there were only six copies of the special Chrysler Newport Phaeton, and no production models created. The co-winners did not receive it. In 1946, an oil painting and a trip was substituted as the award, but winner George Robson died in a motor sports accident before he received it. In 1971, Al Unser received a Dodge Charger from Palmer Dodge in the Indianapolis area, after the Dodge Challenger pace car was damaged in the start crash. Palmer repaired the car and kept it until selling in 2006 to local car collector Steven Cage. In 1991, the Dodge Viper was still a prototype vehicle, and only two were in existence. Winner Rick Mears was awarded instead a Dodge Stealth, which was to be the original pace car but after protests by the UAW (because the Stealth was a captive import built by Mitsubishi in Japan), they were instead used at the track for festival cars.
- Rookie of the Year: Since 1952, the Rookie of the Year award has been presented for the most outstanding performance by a rookie (first year) driver. The award is voted on by a panel of experts, and does not necessarily go to the highest finishing rookie.
- Louis Schwitzer Award: The Louis Schwitzer Award is presented annually to an engineer, or a team of engineers, for excellence in the design, development and implementation of new, innovative motorsports technology concepts for use in the Indianapolis 500.
- Jigger Award: The Jigger Award was presented by the American Auto Racing Writers & Broadcasters Association (AARWBA) for the "hard-luck" driver during time trials. It is in reference to the infamous qualifying gaffe of Leon Duray "Jigger" Sirois at the 1969 race. Selection criteria is very loose, and sometimes lighthearted, but the recipient is usually one of the last drivers bumped from the field, or a driver who fails to qualify (especially if the driver made several unsuccessful attempts).
- Quilt: Among the numerous awards presented to the winner is the traditional Winner's Quilt. Beginning in 1976, Jeanetta Holder hand-crafted a special quilt blanket that featured an Indy-related design and presented the quilt to the winning driver the morning after the race, during the traditional winner's photo shoot. Holder died in December 2023.
- Winner's photo: The morning after the race, the winning driver and team participates in the traditional winner's photo shoot at the start-finish line. The 1981 photo shoot is notable in that race winner Bobby Unser was stripped of the victory when official results were posted. Second place Mario Andretti was elevated to the win, and Andretti took part in the photo shoot. Later in the year, Unser was reinstated the victory, having never sat for a session of official winner photographs. In 2009, heavy rain on Monday morning forced Hélio Castroneves' photo shoot to take place indoors.
- Victory Banquet: The night after the race, the prizes are distributed at the annual 500 Victory Banquet. The traditional awards banquet dates back many decades. In 1972, the black-tie gala was moved to the Indiana Convention Center, and was held there until the mid-2000s. In more recent years, it has been held at a pavilion on the grounds of the Speedway. The 1973 banquet was cancelled due to the rain delay and tragic circumstances surrounding the event. For a brief time (2000–2001), the banquet was held on Sunday night, a few hours after the conclusion of the race. The 2000 race did not end until nearly 6 p.m. due to a rain delay, and participants had to rush downtown to make the banquet on time. In 2002, the banquet was moved back to Monday night. In 1986, the race was delayed until the following Saturday due to rain, and the banquet was cancelled due to scheduling concerns. A private victory luncheon for the top three finishers was held the day after the race at the Speedway Motel.

=== Official standings ===
For many years, the results of the race were considered unofficial until the following day. Immediately after the race, the sanctioning body would begin reviewing the scoring serials, as well as examine video tapes and film, in order to confirm the results, correct scoring errors, make judgements on rules infractions, and assess penalties (or rescind penalties) if necessary. It was not unusual for the vetting process to go late into the evening, beyond midnight, and into the early hours of the next morning. Traditionally, USAC would post the official results at 8 a.m. local time the morning after the race. Revisions were not unusual, as assessed penalties and scoring corrections would be announced in the official standings. However, most corrections were relatively minor, and seldom did drivers lose or gain positions in the final standings. A brief protest period would open for the teams to formally submit complaints, and if there were no protests, the official results would stand as published.

This policy was often a source of controversy, as in earlier years, this made officials apt to document rules infractions as they occurred, but not assess penalties until after the race – rather than during the race. Drivers and teams were sometimes not made fully aware of rules infractions until after they were issued a penalty the next morning. This prevented teams from being able to strategize and make up the penalty deficits during the race itself. In some cases, the penalty dropped them one or more positions in the final standings. By the early to mid-1990s, with speed limits being instituted on pit lane after a fatality during a NASCAR race in 1990, penalties that included making a pit stop without any further activities ("stop and go") or driving through pit lane at the prescribed speed limit without stopping ("drive-through penalty"), have replaced most post-race infractions.

Starting in 1990, a new electronic scoring system was implemented, simplifying the scoring process. In that year, officials were done compiling the official standings very early Sunday evening, but still withheld the official release until 8 a.m. the next day. By 1993, the rules were amended such that the official standings would be released approximately six hours following the conclusion of the race (rather than the next morning). This was largely because computer and GPS-based scoring systems had automated the process, and barring any equipment malfunctions (as happened at Texas in 1997), serial scoring errors were almost non-existent; and significantly more accurate and reliable than previous hand-scoring methods. Manually-assessed penalties (such as one-lap penalties assessed for violations that occurred very late in the race) are occasionally a focus of post-race analysis and scoring revision, as those penalties are typically unable to be served before the race concludes.

== Related events ==
In the days leading up the race, numerous other related and unrelated events are held in and around Indianapolis.

- Tony Hulman Classic – Terre Haute Action Track (USAC Sprints)
- Hoosier Hundred – Indiana State Fairgrounds (USAC Silver Crown Series)
- Carb Night Classic (formerly the Night Before the 500) – Lucas Oil Raceway at Indianapolis.
- The Little 500 – Anderson Speedway: A 500-lap, 33-car sprint car race held the night before the Indianapolis 500 at Anderson Speedway in Anderson, Indiana since 1949.
- Burger Bash (formerly the Carb Night Burger Bash) – Since 2008, Curt Cavin (formerly of The Indianapolis Star) and television pit reporter Kevin Lee host a reception in Indianapolis during the week leading up to the race. Originally it was held on the Friday evening before the race (Carb Day). The reception raises money for charity, and is highlighted by guest appearances by drivers from the starting field, former drivers, and other Indy personalities. In 2008–2015, the event was held at 96th Street Steakburgers, then in 2016–2018, it was held downtown, sponsored by Steak 'n Shake. After a hiatus, the Bash returned in 2022, moving to Monday night of race week. It is held outside the main entrance of the Speedway.

As of 2017, the four racing events are held over four consecutive nights, leading up to the Indy 500 on Sunday. The Hulman Classic is typically Wednesday night, the Hoosier Hundred Thursday night, the Carb Night Classic Friday night, and the Little 500 on Saturday night.

From 1963 through 1970, USAC's stock car division held one of its most prestigious events at the beginning of the "month of May". The Yankee 300 was held at Indianapolis Raceway Park, and was frequented by Indy car drivers. The event was viewed by some as the beginning of the month's festivities

== See also ==
- List of attractions and events in Indianapolis
