= Hulman family =

Indiana business family

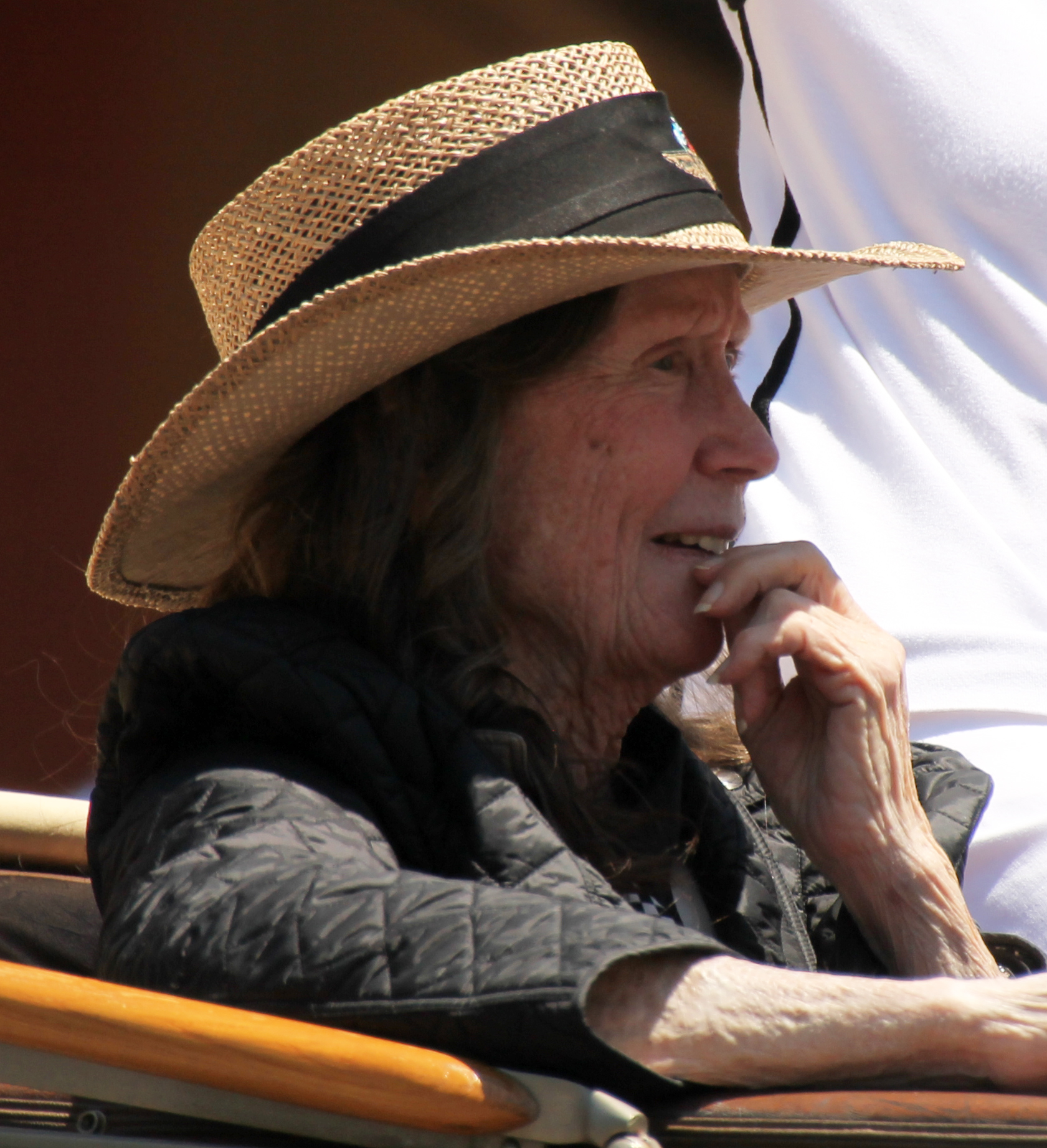
Mari Hulman George

The Hulman family is a family of Indiana businesspeople and philanthropists best known as the former owners of the Indianapolis Motor Speedway, the Indy Racing League and Hulman & Co., which produces Clabber Girl Baking Powder, all of which was sold in 2019.

Notable members include:

- Anton "Tony" Hulman and Mary Fendrich Hulman
  - Mari Hulman George (born Mary Antonia Hulman)
    - Tony George (born Anton Hulman George)
      - Ed Carpenter (Tony's Stepson)
    - Josie George (married Steve Krisiloff)
      - Kyle Krisiloff
