= Indianapolis Motor Speedway Museum =

Museum in Speedway, Indiana, US

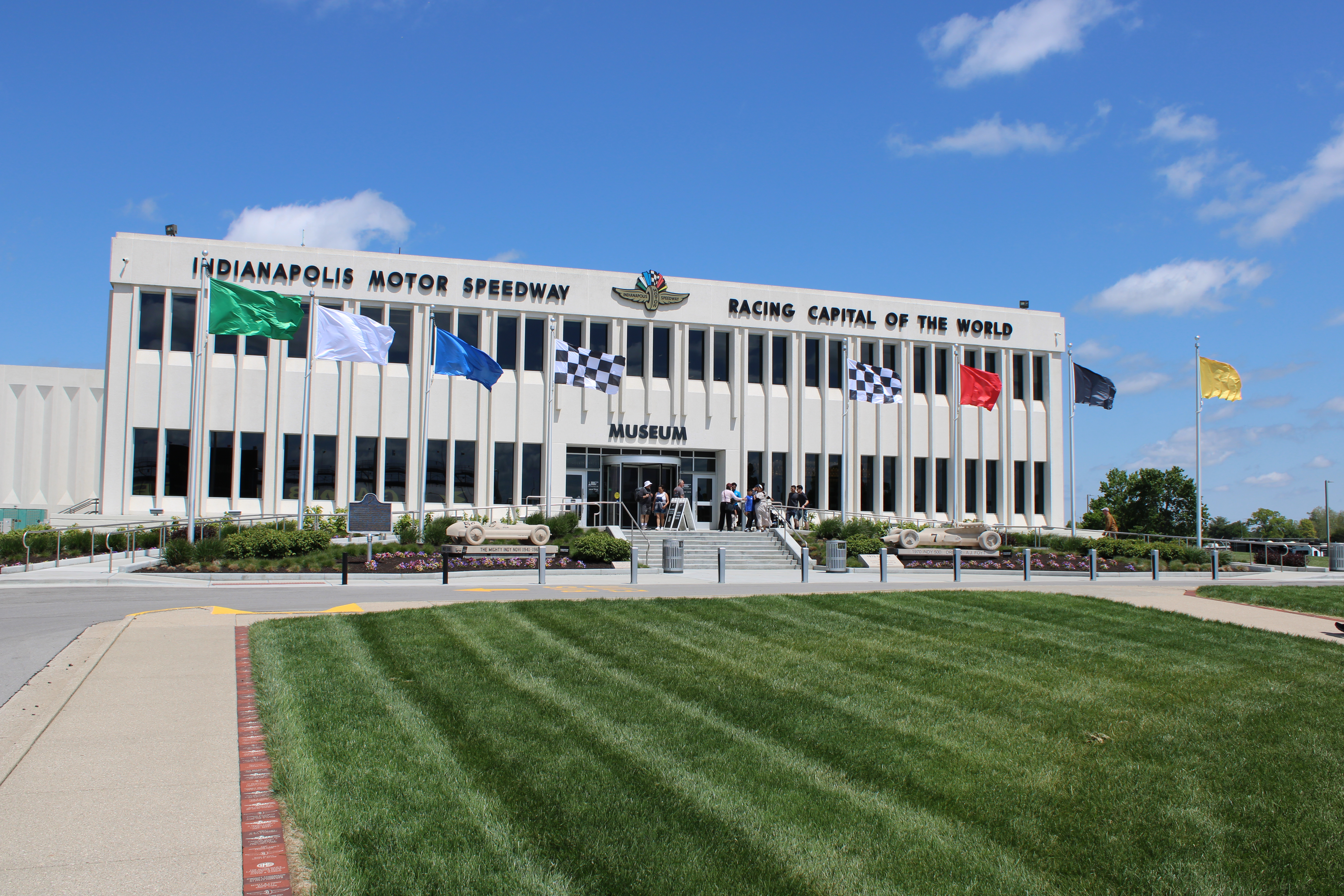
- Indianapolis Motor Speedway Museum in 2026

- Location in Indianapolis
- Former name: Indianapolis Motor Speedway Hall of Fame Museum
- Established: April 7, 1956; 70 years ago
- Location: 4750 West 16th Street; Indianapolis, Indiana 46222
- Coordinates: 39.790298°N 86.233597°W
- Type: Automotive
- Visitors: 1 million (2019)
- Website: Official website

The Indianapolis Motor Speedway Museum is an automotive museum on the grounds of the Indianapolis Motor Speedway in Speedway, Indiana, United States, which houses the Indianapolis Motor Speedway Hall of Fame. It is intrinsically linked to the Indianapolis 500 and Brickyard 400, but it also includes exhibits reflecting other forms of motorsports, passenger cars, and general automotive history. In 2006, it celebrated its 50th anniversary. The museum collection includes several former Indianapolis 500 winning cars, and pace cars, and they are regularly rotated onto the display floor exhibits.

The museum is independently owned and operated by the Indianapolis Motor Speedway Foundation, Inc., a registered 501(c)(3) organization. The museum dates back to 1956, and moved to the current building in 1976. It is located in the infield of the Indianapolis Motor Speedway race course, and is open year-round, except on certain holidays including Thanksgiving and Christmas.

In November 2023 the museum closed for substantial renovations. It reopened on April 2, 2025, after an $89 million renovation and modernization project.

== History ==
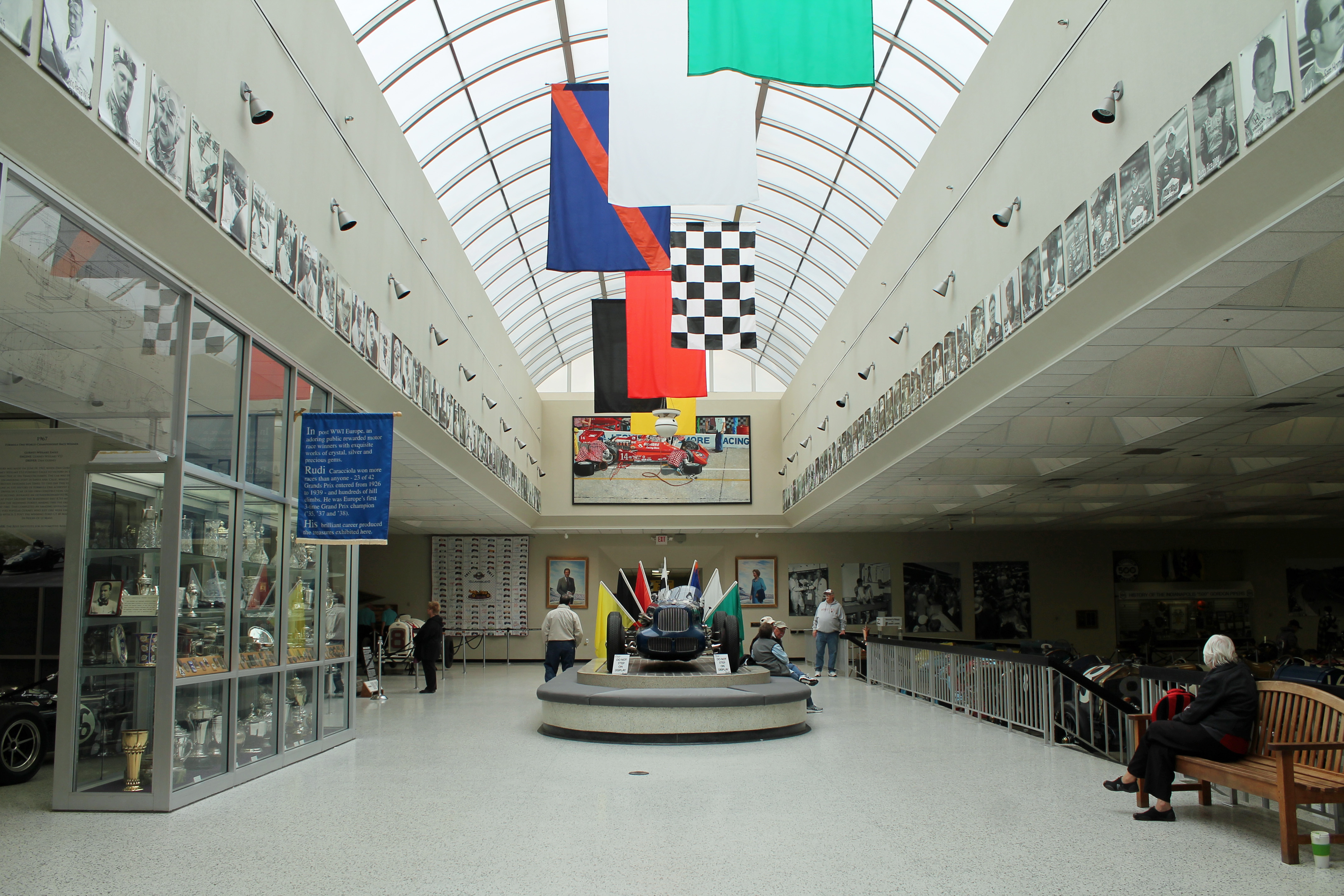
The museum atrium in 2015

The first museum at the Indianapolis Motor Speedway was completed on April 7, 1956. The original building was designed by C. Wilbur Foster and Associates and was sited on the property's southwest corner at the intersection of 16th Street and Georgetown Road. Exhibits included Ray Harroun's 1911 Indianapolis 500-winning car and a handful of other vehicles. Karl Kizer became the first curator. When it opened, it only had six cars; however, within a few years, dozens of collector cars were being donated and acquired, quickly outgrowing available space. According to Speedway publicist Al Bloemker, by 1961, the museum was seeing an average of 5,000 visitors per week (not including month of May crowds).

In 1975, the Indianapolis Motor Speedway broke ground on a new 96,000-square-foot (8,900 m^{2}) museum and administration building inside the track's infield. In addition to the museum, the two-story building housed the Speedway's administrative offices, ticket office, a gift shop, and photography department. The expanded museum opened to the public on April 5, 1976, coinciding with the year-long United States Bicentennial celebration. It officially operated under the name Hall of Fame Museum, but was known colloquially as the Indianapolis Motor Speedway Hall of Fame Museum. The original museum building outside turn one was converted into additional office space.

The Indianapolis Motor Speedway was added to the National Register of Historic Places in 1975 and designated a National Historic Landmark in 1987. A plaque commemorating the property's historic designation is displayed in the museum.

In the summer of 1993, the original museum building outside of turn one was demolished. In its place, a multi-million dollar administration building was erected. The administrative and ticket offices were moved out of the infield museum building and relocated to the new administration building. This freed up floor space and allowed for an expanded gift shop.

In 1993, the museum parking lot hosted the first "Indy 500 Expo" during race festivities, an outdoor interactive spectator exhibit. In 1995, it was expanded and renamed "Indy 500 FanFest". It was discontinued after 1997, but in recent years, smaller displays sponsored by Chevrolet have featured former pace cars and other exhibits. Also, at some point in the 1990s, the photography department added a Halon fire suppression system to the storage room where original film negatives and even glass plates for every race hosted at the track since the inaugural Indianapolis 500 in 1911. (However, no known negatives exist for the inaugural 1909 balloon race event.)

In 2016, a revitalization and modernization project was initiated to expand the museum's floor space and add interactive displays. In April 2016, the museum was officially renamed the Indianapolis Motor Speedway Museum, and the mission was changed "to specifically honor achievement at, and outstanding contributions to, the Indianapolis Motor Speedway." A substantial process of deaccession began to further refine, improve, and update the collection. In late 2023, the museum closed for substantial renovations.

The museum officially re-opened on April 2, 2025. The renovations include seven permanent and three rotating galleries, a new area dedicated to non-vehicle artifacts, and new interactive displays, such as a pit stop challenge allowing visitors to simulate a race-day tire change.

== Exhibits ==
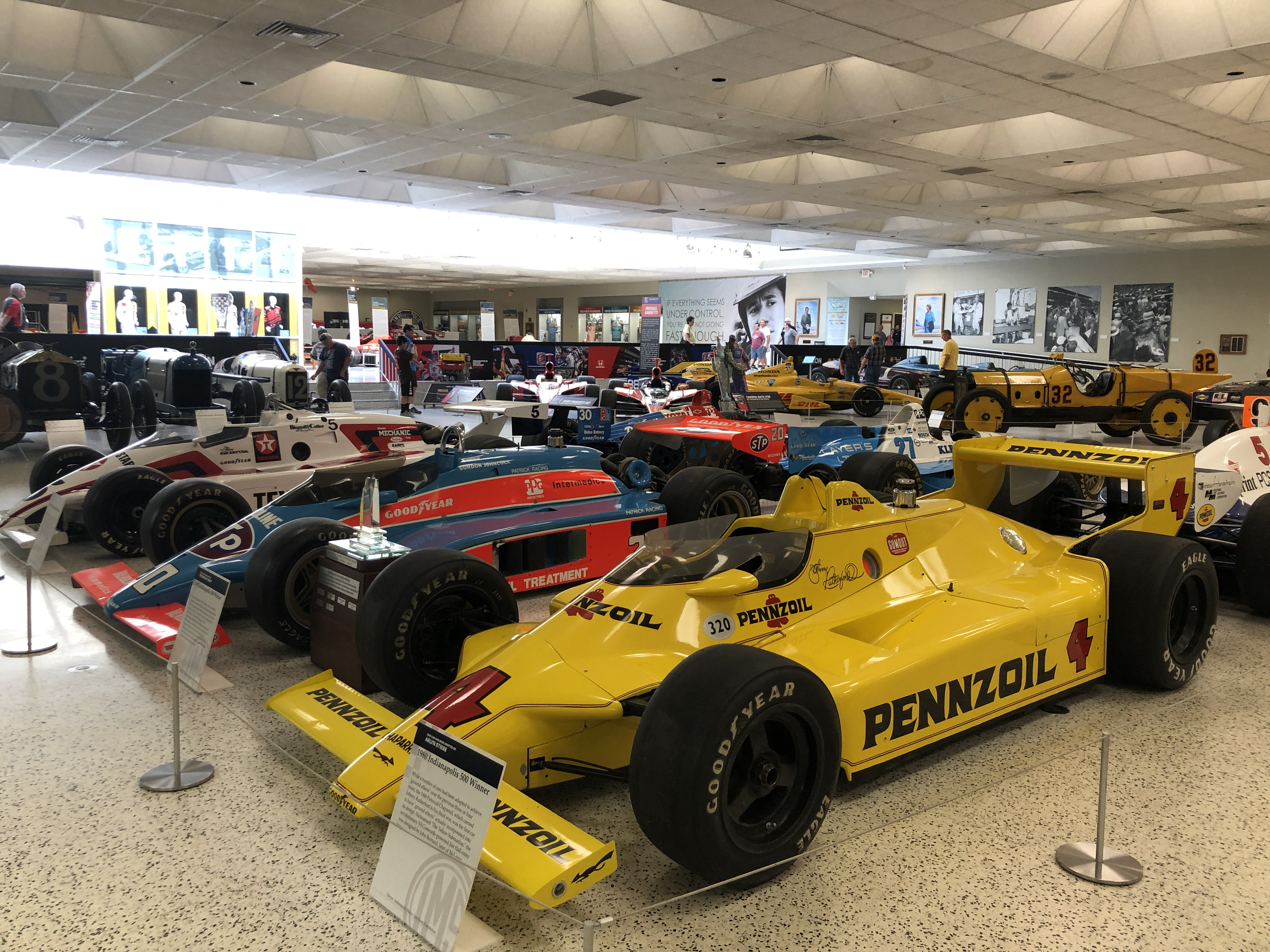
Indianapolis Speedway Museum - Main Display Hall 2019

The museum has about 75 cars on display at any given time. With floor space totaling 37,500 square feet (3,480 m^{2}), only a small portion of the total collection can be displayed. Frequently, cars are sent on loan for display at other museums, historical car shows, parades, and other activities.

The collection includes over thirty Indianapolis 500 winning cars, various other Indy cars, and several racing cars from other disciplines. It also includes pace cars and passenger cars, with a particular focus on those manufactured in Indiana and by Indiana companies. Other items on display include trophies, plaques, and racing paraphernalia such as helmets, gloves, and driver's suits. Rotating exhibits include such elements as model cars, photographs, toys, and paintings. Displays include highlights of the history of Speedway ownership, the evolution of the track, and memorabilia from past years.

=== Indianapolis 500 winning cars ===
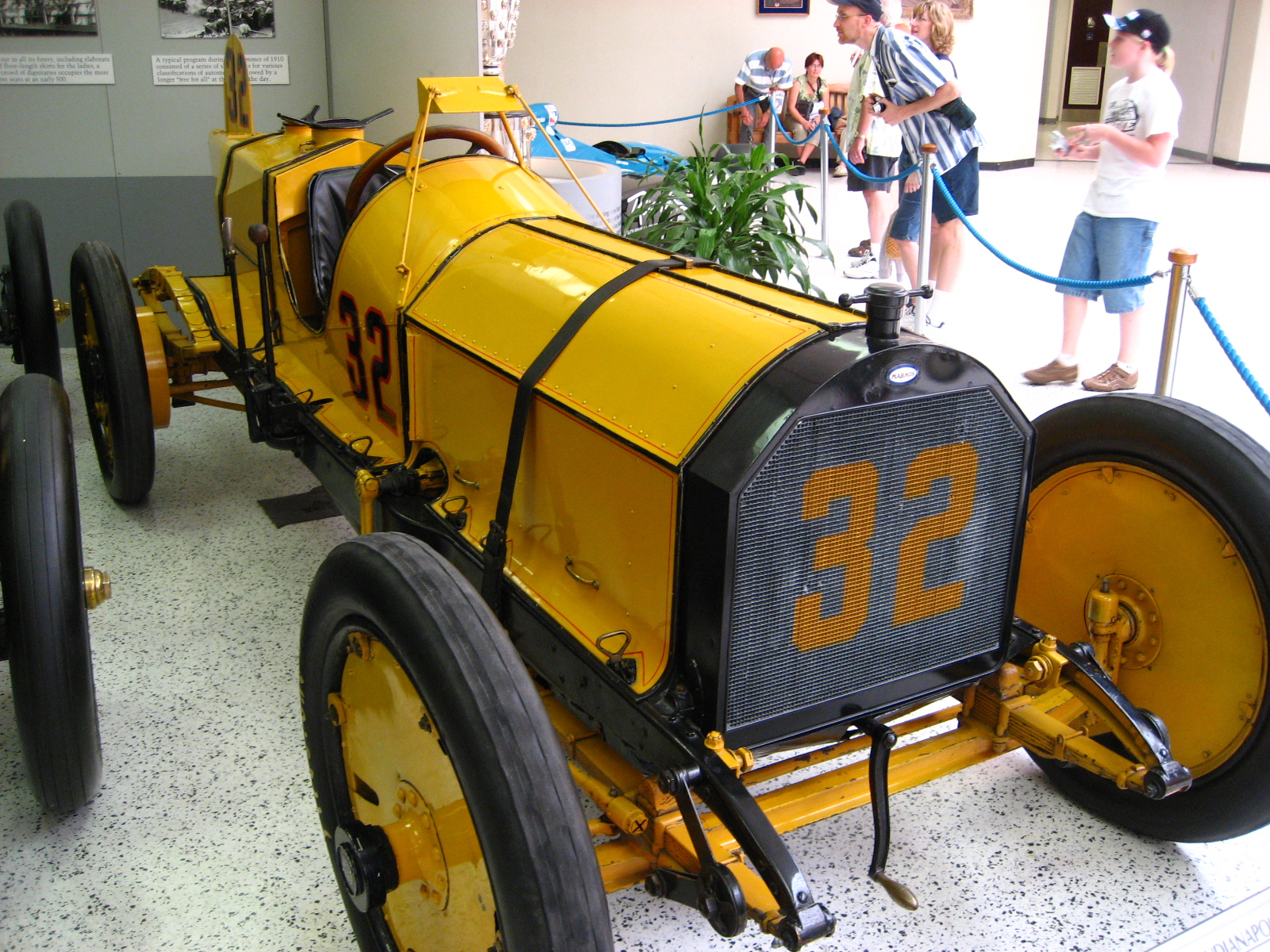
Harroun's 1911-winning Marmon "Wasp" on display at the museum.

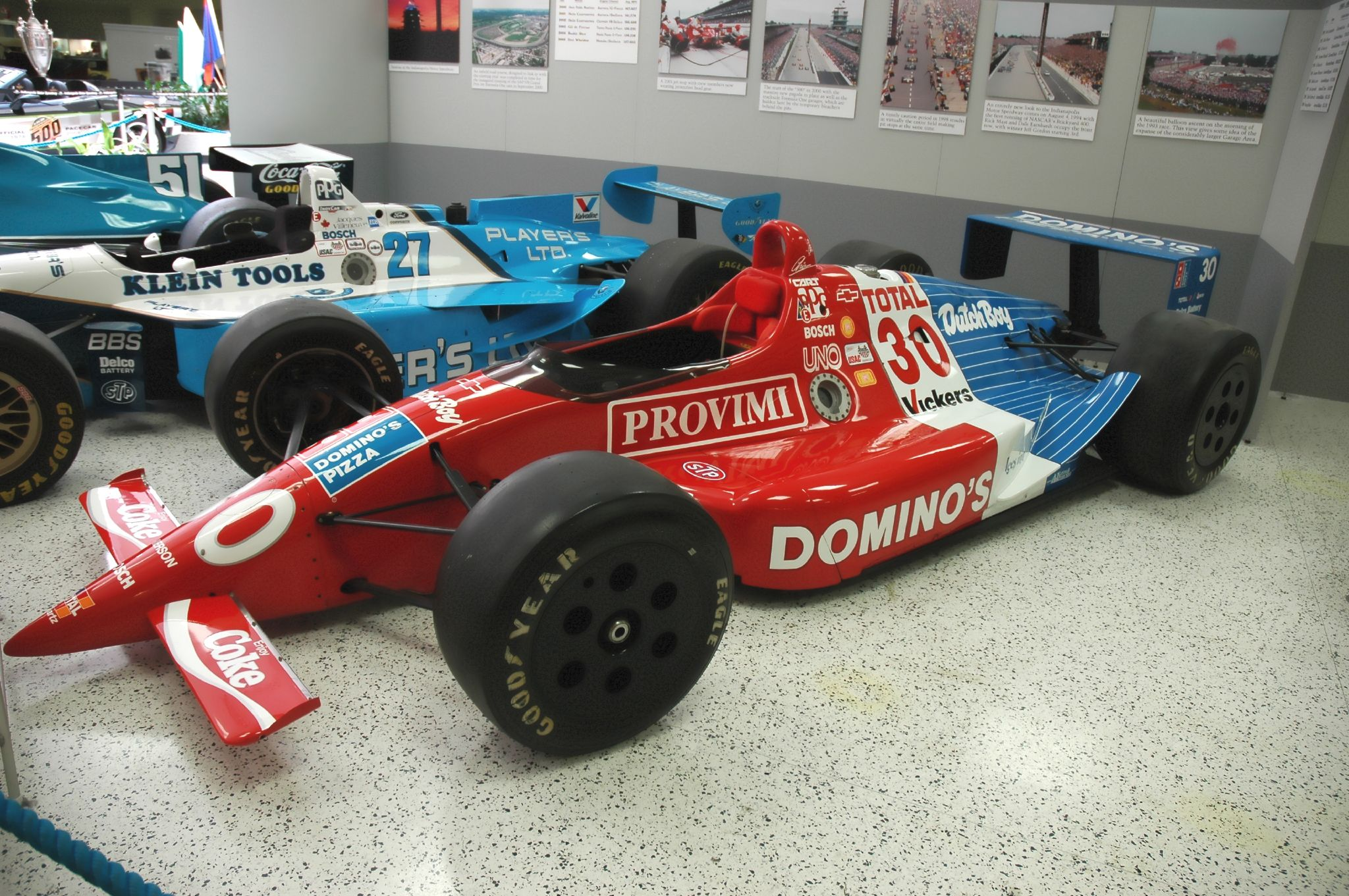
The winning cars of Arie Luyendyk (30), Jacques Villeneuve (27) and Eddie Cheever (51) on display at the museum in 2008.

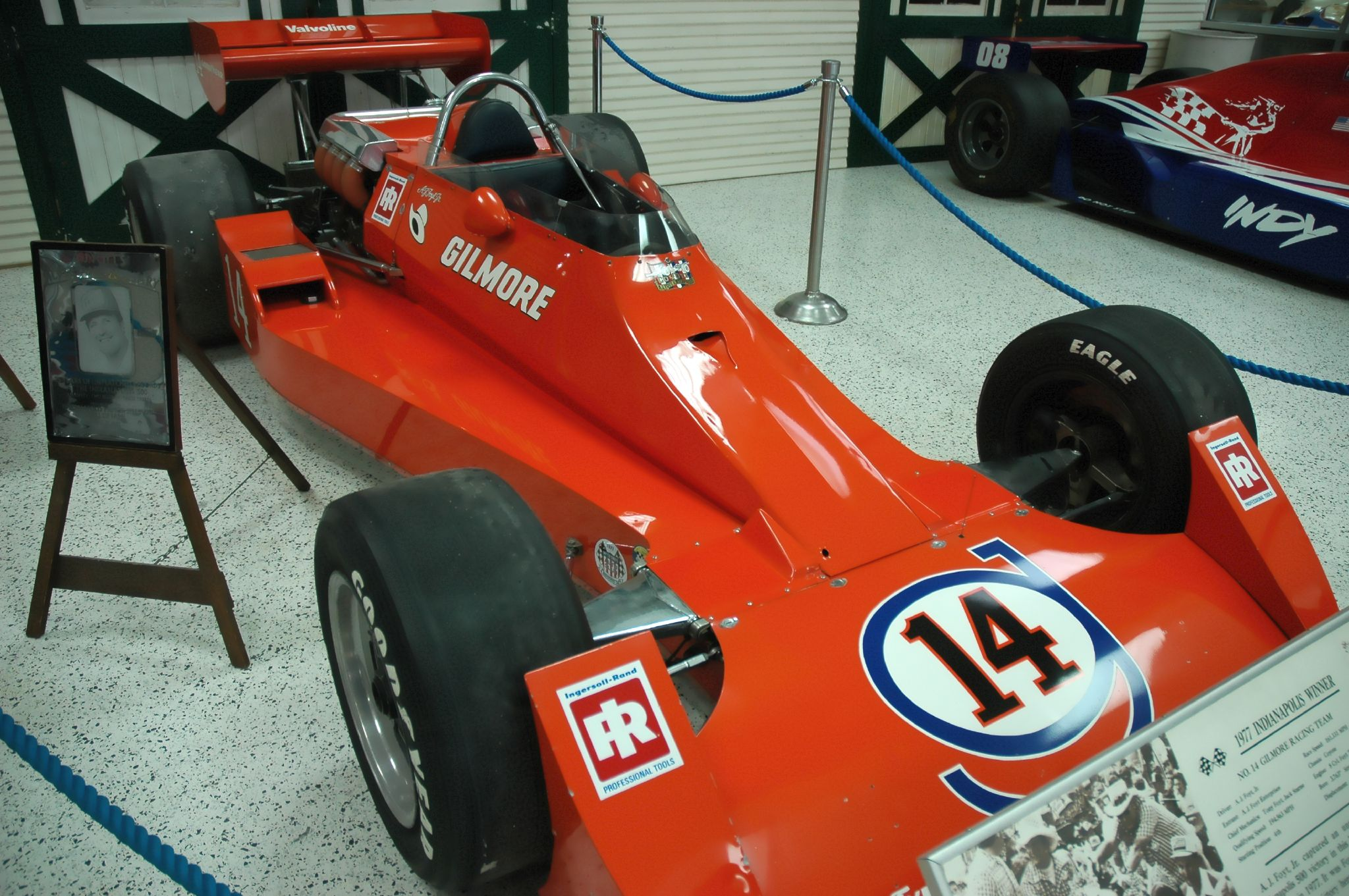
A. J. Foyt's 1977 winning car

- 1911 Marmon Wasp (winner of first Indianapolis 500) (Ray Harroun)
- 1912 National (Joe Dawson)
- 1914 Delage (Rene Thomas)
- 1922 Duesenberg (also won 1921 French Grand Prix at Le Mans; painted in 1921 livery) (Jimmy Murphy)
- 1925/1927 Duesenberg (driven by Peter DePaolo in 1925, and by George Souders in 1927)
- 1928 Miller (Louis Meyer)
- 1932 Miller-Hartz (Fred Frame)
- 1939–1940 Boyle Special Maserati (back-to-back winner) (driven both years by Wilbur Shaw)
- 1941 Noc-Out Hose Clamp Special (Floyd Davis/Mauri Rose)
- 1946 Thorne Engineering (first race under Hulman ownership) (George Robson)
- 1947–1948 Blue Crown Spark Plug Special (back-to-back winner) (driven both years by Mauri Rose)
- 1950 Wynn's Offy (Johnnie Parsons)
- 1951 Belanger Special (Lee Wallard)
- 1953–1954 Fuel Injection Offy (back-to-back winner) (Bill Vukovich)
- 1955 John Zink Offy (Bob Sweikert)
- 1957–1958 Belond Special Offy (back-to-back winner) (Sam Hanks in 1957; Jimmy Bryan in 1958)
- 1960 Ken Paul Special (replica) (Jim Rathmann)
- 1961 Bowes Seal Fast Offy (A. J. Foyt)
- 1962 Leader Card Watson Roadster (Rodger Ward)
- 1963 Agajanian Watson Offy replica ("Calhoun") (Parnelli Jones)
- 1964 Sheraton-Thompson Watson Offy (A. J. Foyt)
- 1967 Sheraton-Thompson Coyote Foyt (A. J. Foyt)
- 1968 Rislone Special Eagle (Bobby Unser)
- 1969 STP Hawk Ford (replica) (Mario Andretti)
- 1972 Sunoco McLaren (Mark Donohue)
- 1973 STP Eagle Offy (Gordon Johncock)
- 1977 Gilmore Racing Team Coyote/Foyt (A. J. Foyt)
- 1978 First National City Traveler's Checks Lola/Cosworth (Al Unser Sr.)
- 1980 Pennzoil Chapparal (Johnny Rutherford)
- 1982 STP Wildcat/Cosworth (Gordon Johncock)
- 1983 Texaco Star March/Cosworth (Tom Sneva)
- 1986 Budweiser Truesports March/Cosworth (Bobby Rahal)
- 1990 Domino's Pizza Hot One Lola/Chevrolet (Arie Luyendyk)
- 1995 Player's Ltd. Reynard/Ford Cosworth BX (Jacques Villeneuve)

=== Other Indy cars ===
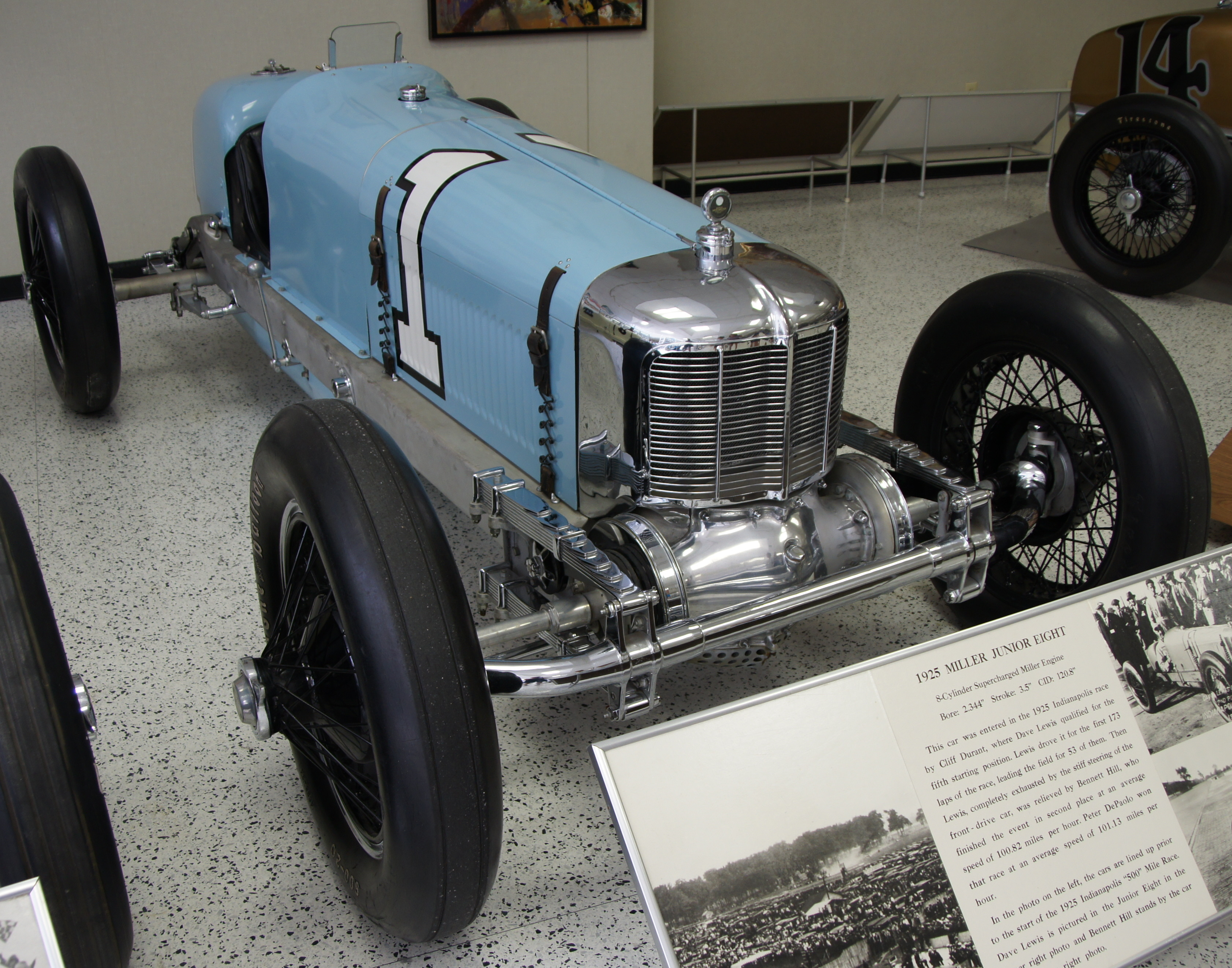
1925 Miller Junior Eight on display at the museum

- 1912 Fiat driven by Teddy Tetzlaff to second place
- 1925 Miller Junior Eight
- 1925 Miller Special
- 1931 Cummins Diesel driven by Dave Evans (first car to complete the Indianapolis 500 without a pit stop)
- 1935 Miller-Ford
- 1938 Bowes Seal Fast Special driven by Louis Meyer (flipped car during race, and retired)
- 1940 Sampson Special
- 1948 Alfa Romeo Tipo 308 driven by Johnny Mauro
- 1950 Cummins Diesel Special driven by Jimmy Jackson
- 1950 Russo-Nichels Special (won the open wheel race at Darlington by Paul Russo)
- 1952 Ferrari Special
- 1954 Dean Van Lines Special (Jimmy Bryan; 2nd-place finisher)
- 1956 Wolcott Special (driven by Len Sutton, and Rodger Ward at Darlington)
- 1957 Dean Van Lines Special (winner of 1957 Race of Two Worlds)
- 1958 Leader Card Monza (winner of 1958 Race of Two Worlds)
- 1961 Cooper Climax driven by Jack Brabham, the first car of the European rear-engined revolution (the car in the museum is the back-up car a normal Cooper T53 Grand Prix car and not the T54 that Brabham drove).
- 1963 Lotus Powered by Ford driven by Jim Clark
- 1976 Bryant Heating & Cooling Offy driven by Janet Guthrie during practice.
- 1977 Bryant Heating & Cooling Lightning/Offy driven by Janet Guthrie, the first female to qualify for the Indy 500.
- 1968 STP Wedge Lotus/Turbine
- 1995 Reynard/Ford Cosworth XB driven by Arie Luyendyk (set current IMS track record in 1996)
- 2005 Panoz/Honda driven by Danica Patrick, the first female driver to lead a lap during the Indianapolis 500

=== Passenger cars ===
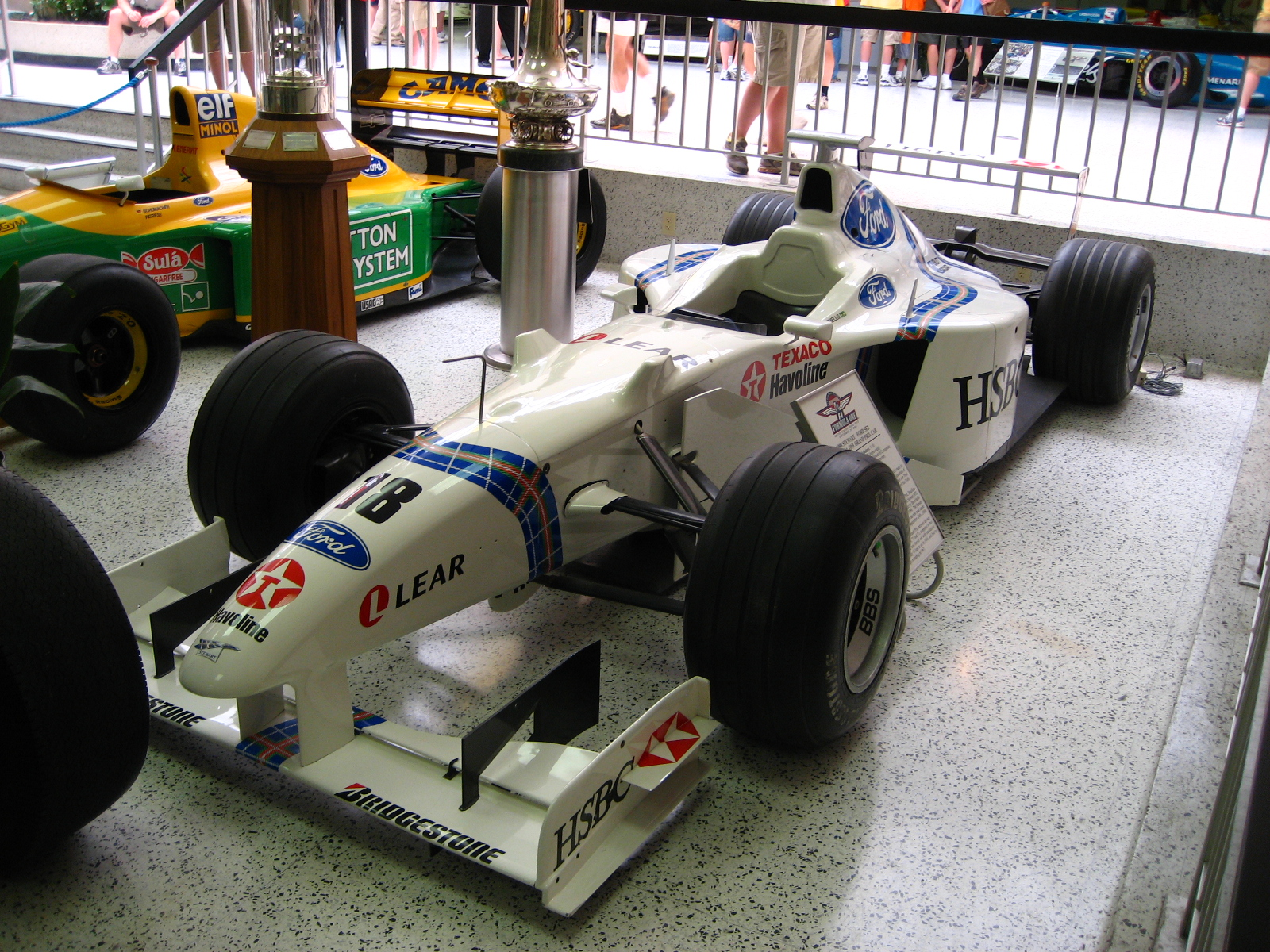
Rubens Barrichello's SF02 on display at the museum

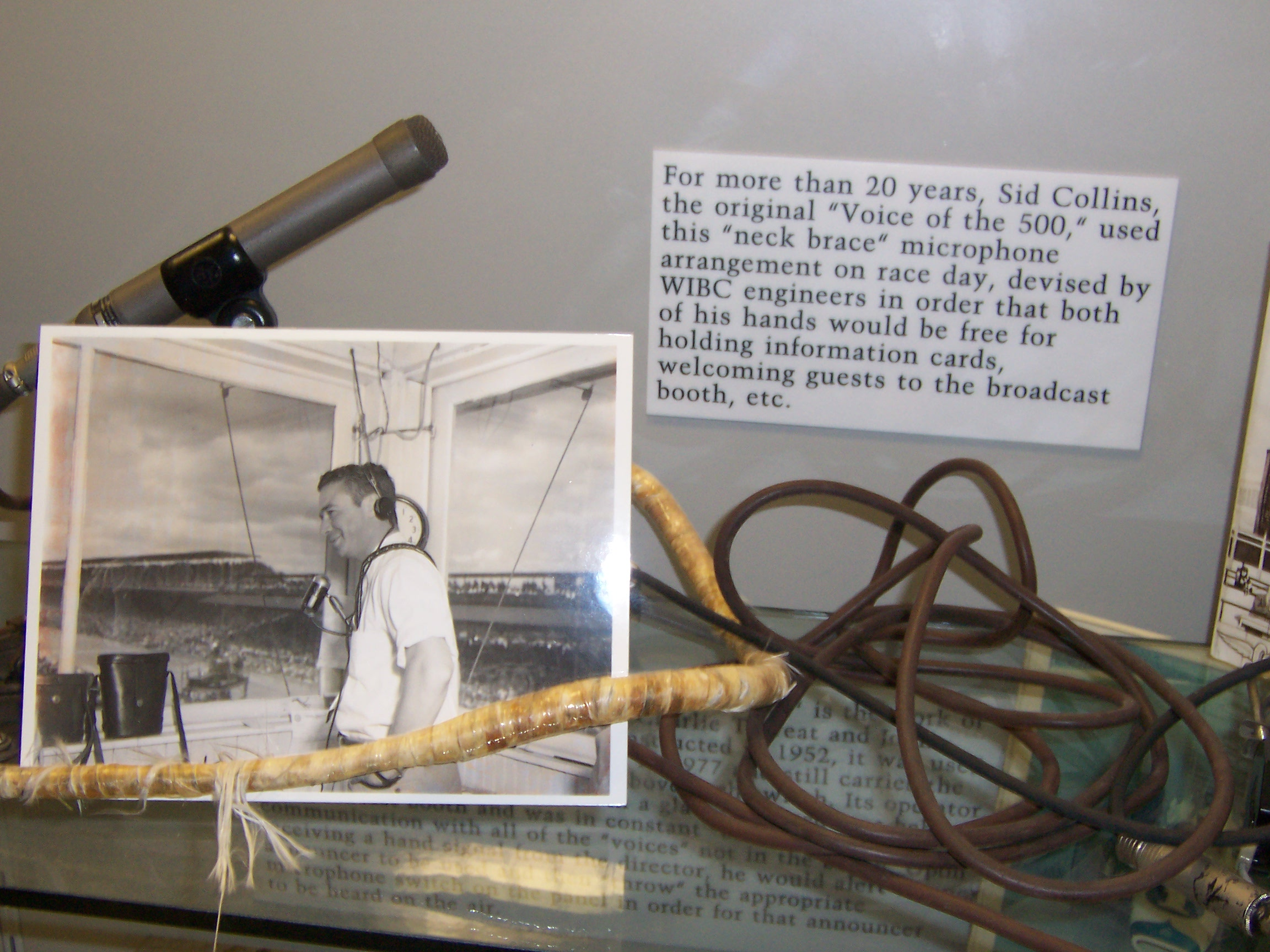
Sid Collins exhibit

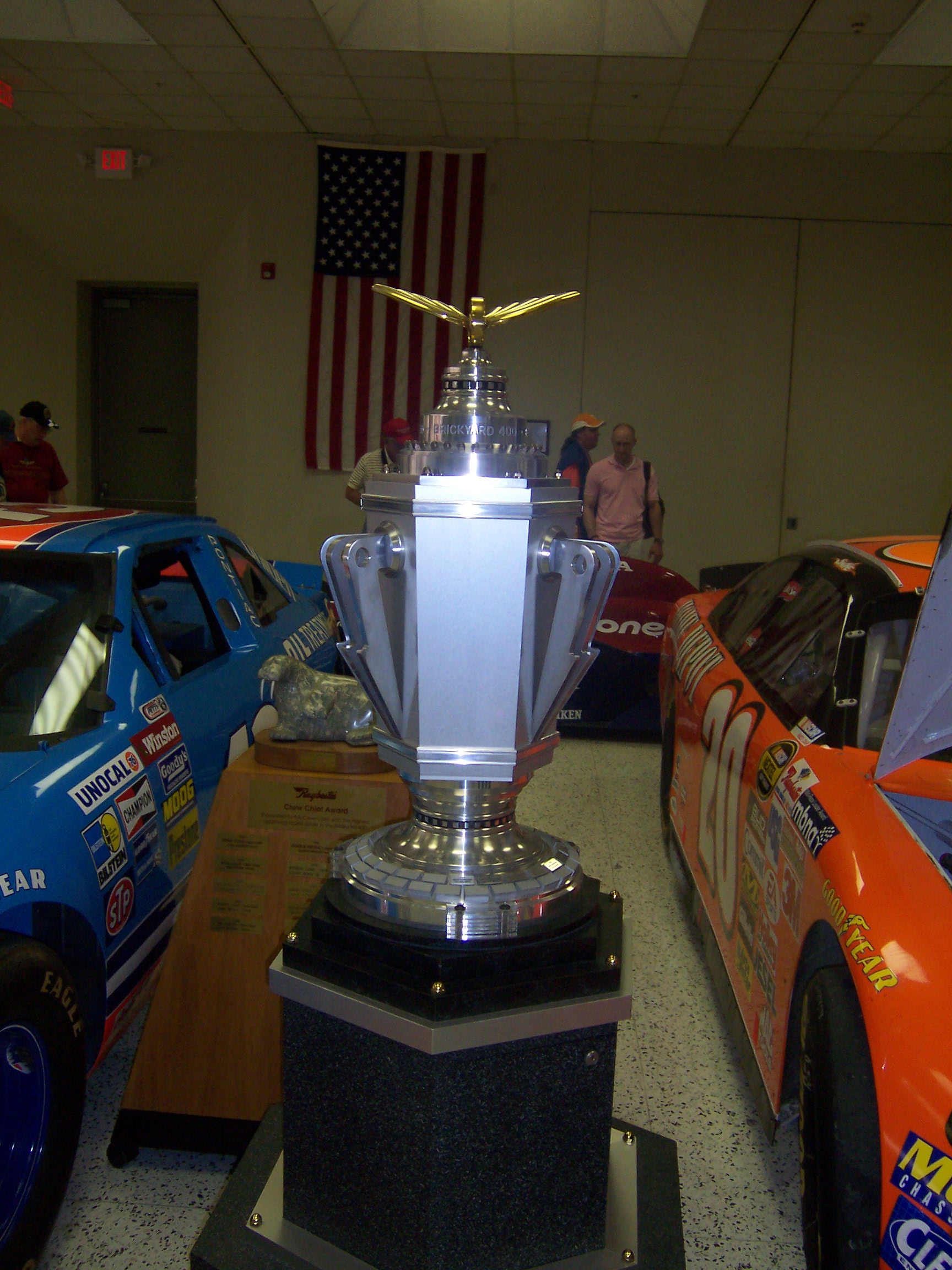
PPG Trophy for the Brickyard 400

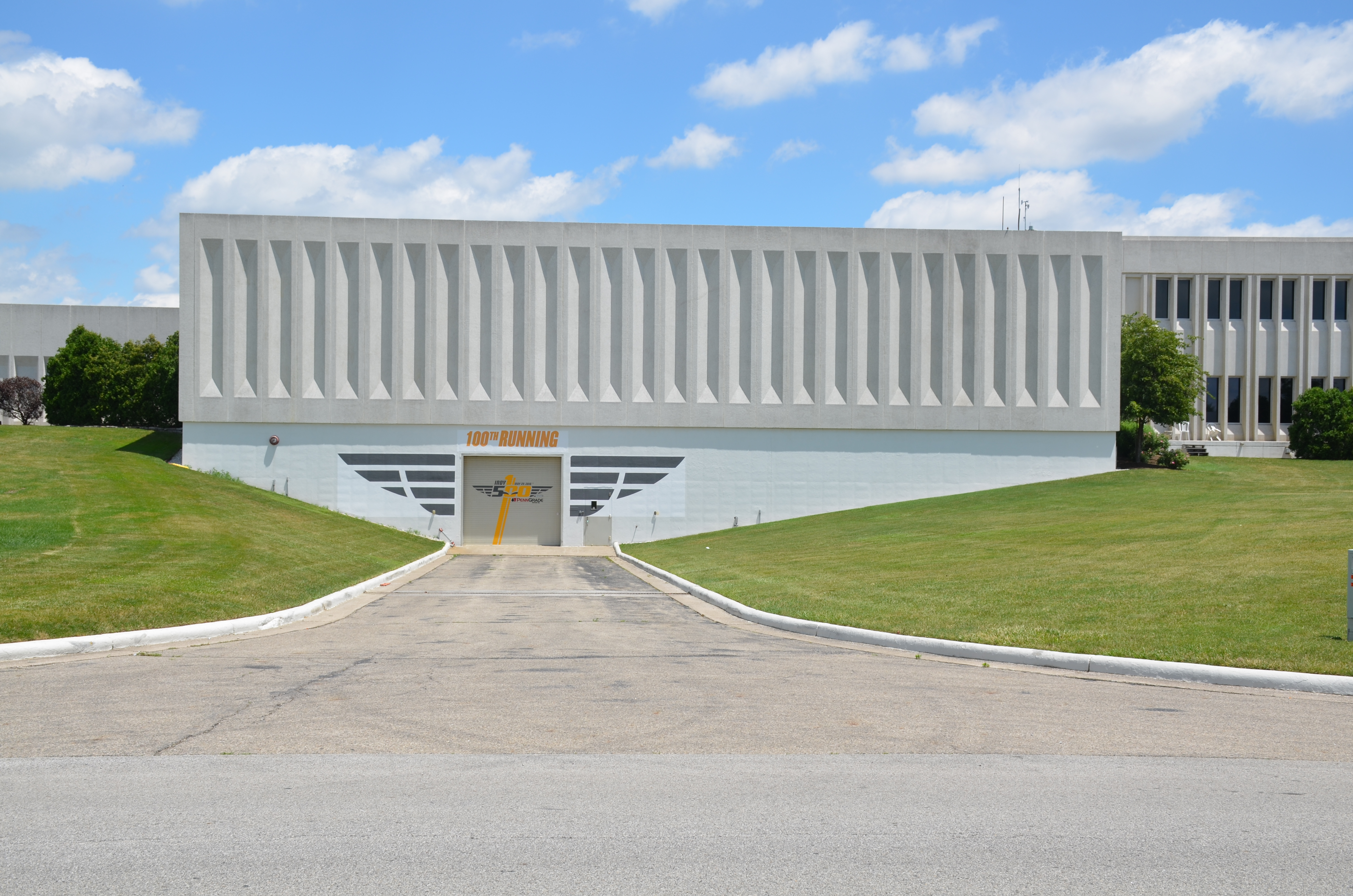
Entrance to the basement at the IMS Museum

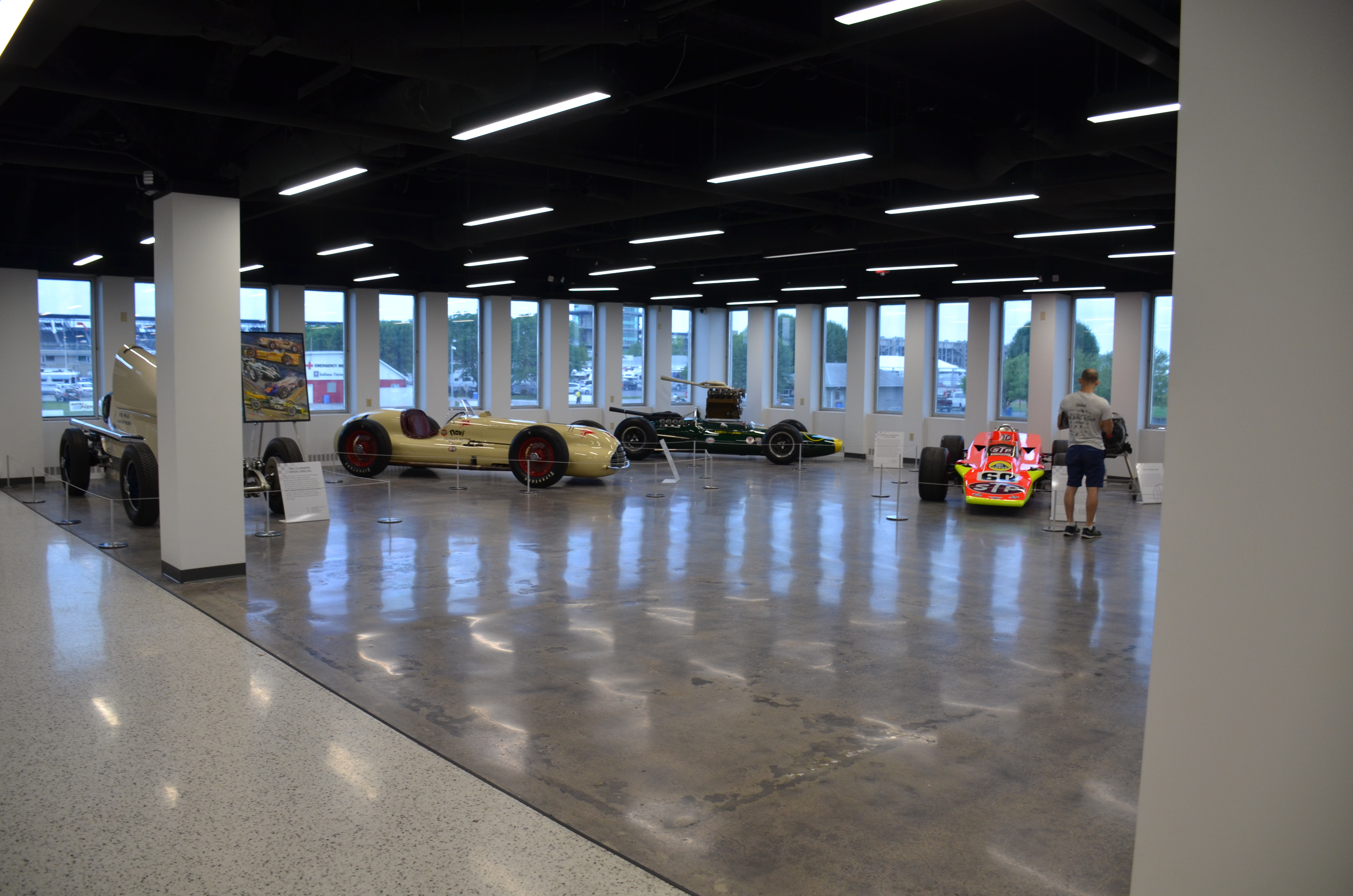
North wing

- At least one Indy 500 pace car from 1911, 1930, 1964, 1966, and 1975 to the present.
- 1886 Daimler "Motor Carriage"
- 1886 Benz Patent Motorwagen
- 1903 Premier
- 1903 Premier Special owned by Carl Fisher
- 1908 Richmond Surrey
- 1909 Haynes
- 1911 Cole 30
- 1914 Marmon roadster
- 1925 McFarlan TV6 passenger roadster.

=== Other race cars ===
- A NASCAR Winston Cup stock car driven and donated by Richard Petty in 1993.
- A sprint car driven by A. J. Foyt and George Snider
- 2007 Allstate 400 at the Brickyard winning car driven by Tony Stewart
- 1998 Stewart SF02-Ford Formula One car
- 1991 Benetton B191B-Ford Formula One car
- 1965 Le Mans-winning Ferrari 250 LM.
- 1964 Hussein 1/Dodge Zerex Special driven by A. J. Foyt
- 1957 SSI Corvette
- 1954–55 Mercedes-Benz W196 Formula One car
- 1929 Bugatti 35-B
- 1907 Itala G.P. race car
- 1906 Laurin & Klement race car
- 1906 Renault AK 90CV
- Indy car used during the filming of Winning (not restored)
- 1965 Spirit of America – Sonic 1 Land Speed Record car

=== Trophies ===
- Permanent home for the Borg-Warner Trophy
- The Wheeler-Schebler Trophy, which pre-dates the Borg-Warner
- Permanent home for the PPG trophy, awarded to the winner of the Brickyard 400
- Historic Race of Two Worlds trophy
- Display case of historic trophies and medals from a broad range of racing events

=== Selected exhibits ===
- Various paintings and photographs from noteworthy artists
- Indianapolis Motor Speedway Radio Network exhibit, including antique radio equipment
- The Tony Hulman theatre, showing a short film about the history of the race
- An additional admission includes a bus tour of the track

=== Special exhibits ===
In recent years, the museum has featured one or two special exhibits per year, one running roughly from early spring through the fall, and another in the intervening months.

- 2011: The Ultimate Indianapolis 500 Winning Car Collection
- 2016: Team Penske 50th Anniversary exhibit
- 2016: Tony Stewart exhibit
- 2017: A. J. Foyt exhibit (40th Anniversary of Foyt's fourth Indy 500 victory)
- 2017: Incredible Engines of the Indianapolis 500 and 50th Anniversary of the Camaro Pace Car
- 2018: The Amazing Unsers: celebrating Al Unser, Bobby Unser, Al Unser Jr., and the rest of the Unser racing family.
- 2018: Hoosier Thunder: Indiana's Short Track Racing Heritage
- 2019: Mario Andretti exhibit ("Mario Andretti: Icon")
- 2021: Rick Mears exhibit ("Rocket Rick Mears")
- 2022: "Roadsters 2 Records" (front-engine Indy roadsters from the 1960s)

=== Basement ===
Due to the size of the collection, and space constraints on the display floor, a large portion of the collection is in storage. Some cars are rotated into display, while others remained in storage permanently, out of public view. Prior to the 2023–25 renovations, the museum's storage areas were off-limits to the public, and admittance was by invitation only. The contents of the stored collection had become a source of folklore and mystique, as it includes some extremely rare vehicles that few visitors were allowed to see, and photography was strictly forbidden. However, access to the basement became public when the museum reopened in 2025 and can now be viewed by all museum visitors.

=== North Hall ===
In 2016, the museum display floor was expanded by 7,500 square feet after Speedway staff offices were relocated to another building. The new North Hall is used to display additional cars, and offers a view of a portion of the Speedway road course.

== Indianapolis Motor Speedway Hall of Fame ==
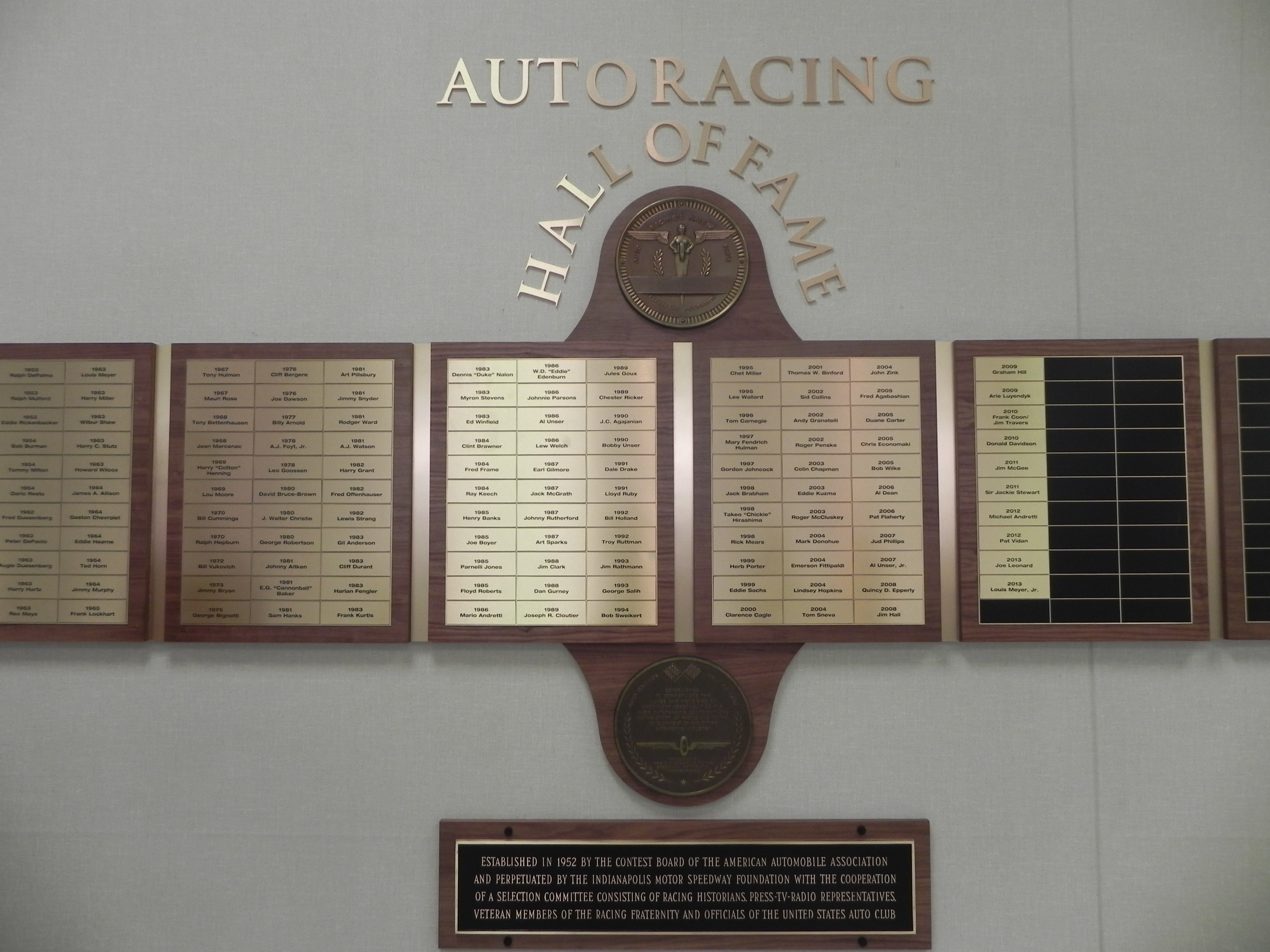
The Auto Racing Hall of Fame

The Indianapolis Motor Speedway Hall of Fame, formerly known as the Auto Racing Hall of Fame, dates back to 1952. It was established and supported by the American Automobile Association (AAA) and the Ford Foundation. It was originally the brainchild of Tony Hulman who had expressed interest in starting a racing hall of fame shortly after he purchased the Indianapolis Motor Speedway in 1945. As of 2025, there have been 169 inductees enshrined into the hall.

AAA dropped out of racing entirely after 1955. After being established for only three years, and after only a handful of historical, "veterans committee" inductees, the hall of fame went dormant. A year later, the first Indianapolis Motor Speedway museum opened its doors. In 1961, Hulman acquired and revived the hall of fame, and incorporated it into the Speedway museum's organization.

Candidates can be nominated after at least twenty years have elapsed from the first date of participation in activities involved with professional-level auto racing. Drivers do not have to be retired from racing in order to be considered. Inductees are elected by a panel of roughly 150 members consisting of racing officials, living hall of fame members, historians, and select media representatives. In 2018, the scope of the Hall of Fame was redefined and clarified as encompassing participants in all major racing events at the Indianapolis Motor Speedway: the Indianapolis 500, Brickyard 400/Verizon 200, U.S. Grand Prix (2000–2007), and major AMA-sanctioned motorcycle racing (such as MotoGP and MotoAmerica). Subsequent to that, Jeff Gordon became the first driver inducted whose accomplishments were primarily or exclusively attributed to a race other than the Indianapolis 500.

Voting is held annually and inductees are typically announced in the spring. In some years, they have been announced on or around Founders Day (March 20), the date on which the Indianapolis Motor Speedway was incorporated in 1909. The new members are formally enshrined during a special ceremony held in May, a few days before the Indianapolis 500. There is no set number of inductees for each year, and the number varies annually.

The 2026 Hall of Fame inductees were Scott Dixon and Giampaolo Dallara.

(W) — Denotes Indianapolis 500 winning driver

(O) — Denotes Indianapolis 500 winning owner

(BY) — Denotes Brickyard 400 winning driver

(BYO) — Denotes Brickyard 400 winning owner

(GP) — Denotes U.S.G.P. winning driver

=== Inductees – Drivers ===
- Fred Agabashian
- Johnny Aitken
- Gil Andersen
- Mario Andretti (W)
- Michael Andretti (O)
- Billy Arnold (W)
- Erwin G. "Cannon Ball" Baker
- Henry Banks
- Cliff Bergere
- Tony Bettenhausen
- Joe Boyer (W)
- Jack Brabham
- David Bruce-Brown
- Jimmy Bryan (W)
- Bob Burman
- Duane Carter Sr.
- Hélio Castroneves (W, O)
- Gaston Chevrolet (W)
- Louis Chevrolet (O)
- Jim Clark (W)
- Earl Cooper
- Bill Cummings (W)
- Wally Dallenbach Sr.
- Joe Dawson (W)
- Ralph DePalma (W)
- Pete DePaolo (W, O)
- Mark Donohue (W)
- Cliff Durant
- Dale Earnhardt Sr. (BY)
- Harlan Fengler
- Emerson Fittipaldi (W)
- Pat Flaherty (W)
- A. J. Foyt (W, O)
- Fred Frame (W)
- Dario Franchitti (W)
- Chip Ganassi (O, BYO)
- Paul Goldsmith
- Jeff Gordon (BY)
- Jules Goux (W)
- Harry Grant
- Janet Guthrie
- Dan Gurney (O)
- Sam Hanks (W)
- Ray Harroun (W)
- Harry Hartz (O)
- Eddie Hearne
- Ralph Hepburn
- Graham Hill (W)
- Bill Holland (W)
- Ted Horn
- Gordon Johncock (W)
- Parnelli Jones (W, O)
- Tony Kanaan (W)
- Ray Keech (W)
- Joe Leonard
- Frank Lockhart (W)
- Arie Luyendyk (W)
- Rex Mays
- Roger McCluskey
- Jim McElreath
- Jack McGrath
- Bruce McLaren
- Rick Mears (W)
- Louis Meyer (W, O)
- Chet Miller
- Tommy Milton (W)
- Juan Pablo Montoya (W)
- Lou Moore (O)
- Ralph Mulford
- Jimmy Murphy (W, O)
- Duke Nalon
- Barney Oldfield
- Johnnie Parsons (W)
- Bobby Rahal (W, O)
- Jim Rathmann (W)
- Dario Resta (W)
- Eddie Rickenbacker
- Floyd Roberts (W)
- Mauri Rose (W)
- Lloyd Ruby
- Johnny Rutherford (W)
- Troy Ruttman (W)
- Eddie Sachs
- Michael Schumacher (GP)
- Wilbur Shaw (W, O)
- Tom Sneva (W)
- Jimmy Snyder
- Myron Stevens
- Jackie Stewart
- Tony Stewart (BY, BYO)
- Lewis Strang
- Danny Sullivan (W)
- Bob Sweikert (W)
- Al Unser (W)
- Al Unser Jr. (W)
- Bobby Unser (W)
- Bill Vukovich (W)
- Lee Wallard (W)
- Rodger Ward (W)
- Dan Wheldon (W)
- Howdy Wilcox (W)

=== Inductees – Owners / Chief Mechanics / Contributors ===
- J. C. Agajanian (O)
- James A. Allison
- George Bignotti (O)
- Thomas W. Binford
- Clint Brawner
- Clarence Cagle
- Phil Casey
- Tom Carnegie
- Colin Chapman (O)
- J. Walter Christie
- Tim Cindric
- Joe Cloutier
- Sid Collins
- Frank Coon
- Donald Davidson
- Al Dean
- Bert Dingley
- Dale Drake
- August Duesenberg
- Fred Duesenberg
- Chris Economaki
- W. D. "Eddie" Edenburn
- Quin Epperly
- Harvey S. Firestone Sr.
- Carl G. Fisher
- Henry Ford
- Mari Hulman George
- Tony George
- Earl B. Gilmore
- Leo Goossen
- Andy Granatelli (O)
- Jim Hall (O)
- Harry C. "Cotton" Henning
- Takeo "Chickie" Hirashima
- Lindsey Hopkins
- Mary Fendrich Hulman
- Anton "Tony" Hulman
- Bob Jenkins
- Frank Kurtis (O)
- Eddie Kuzma
- Jean Marcenac
- Jim McGee
- Leo Mehl
- Louis "Sonny" Meyer Jr.
- Harry Miller
- Theodore E. "Pop" Myers
- Fred Offenhauser
- Paul Page
- U.E. "Pat" Patrick (O)
- Roger Penske (O, BYO)
- Jud Phillips
- Art Pillsbury
- Herb Porter
- Chester Ricker
- George Robertson
- George Salih (O)
- Bill Simpson
- Art Sparks
- Harry C. Stutz
- Jim Travers
- William K. Vanderbilt
- Pat Vidan
- Fred Wagner
- A. J. Watson
- Lew Welch
- Bob Wilke
- Ed Winfield
- John Zink

== Gallery ==
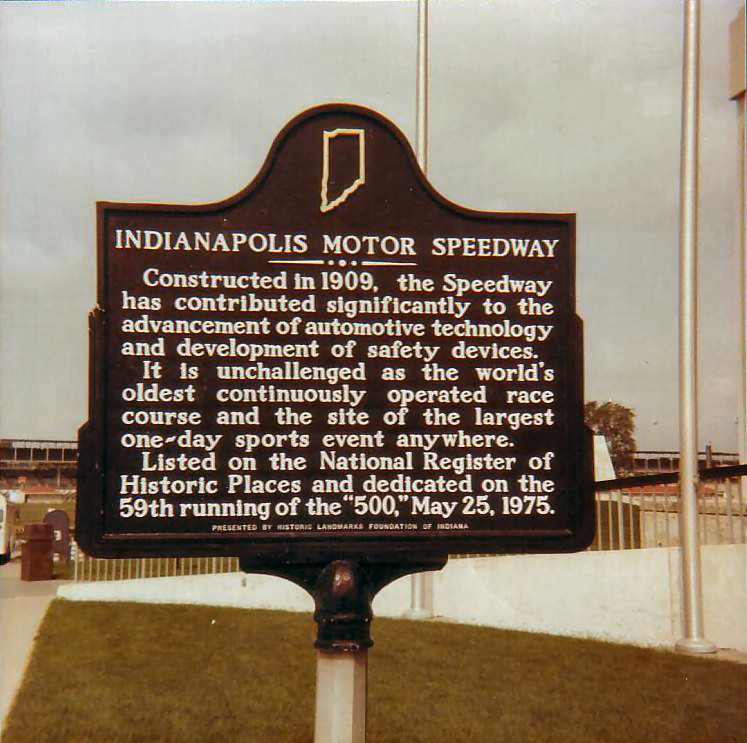
Indiana state historical marker outside the IMS Hall of Fame Museum

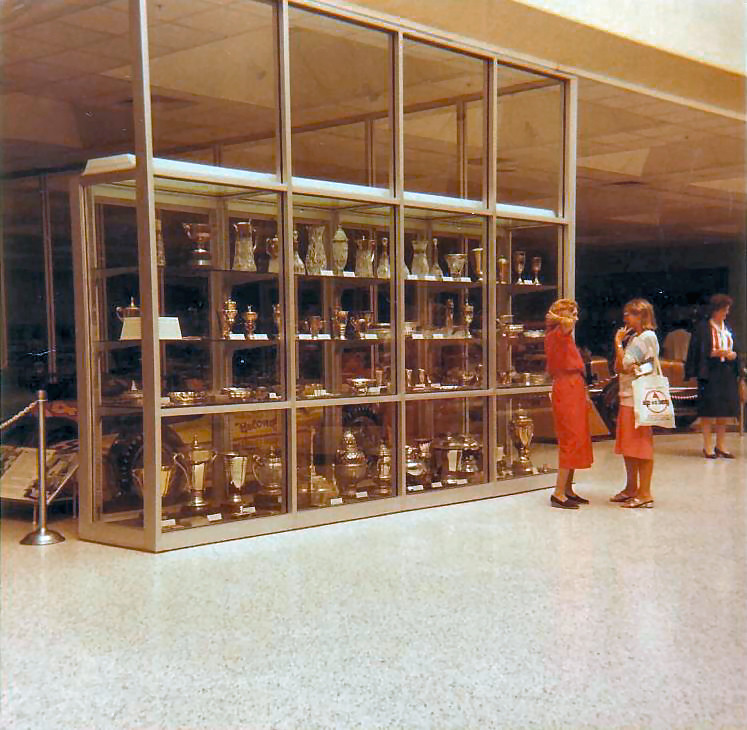
Trophy cabinet at the Hall of Fame Museum

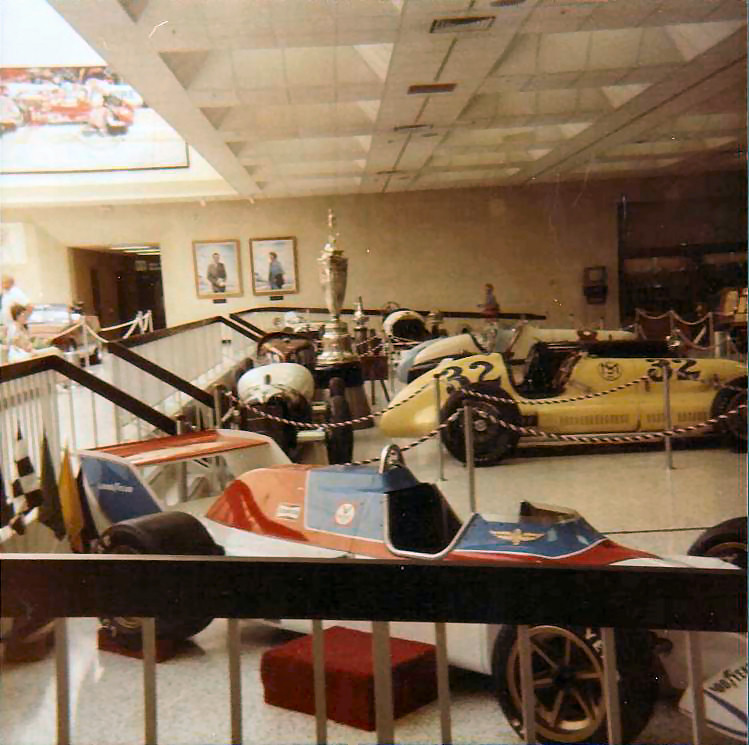
Racing cars at the Hall of Fame Museum

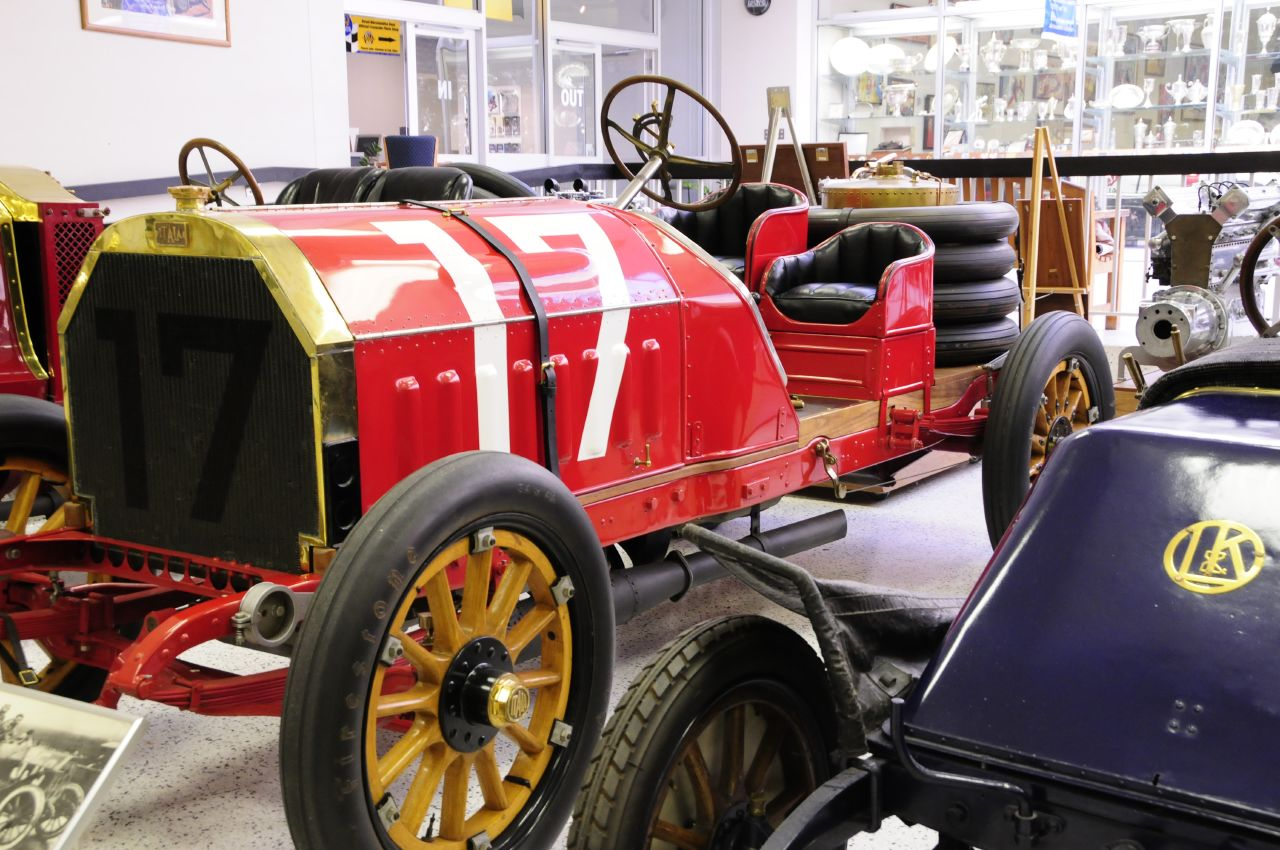
1907 Itala G.P. race car with 14.75 liter (900 cubic-inch) engine

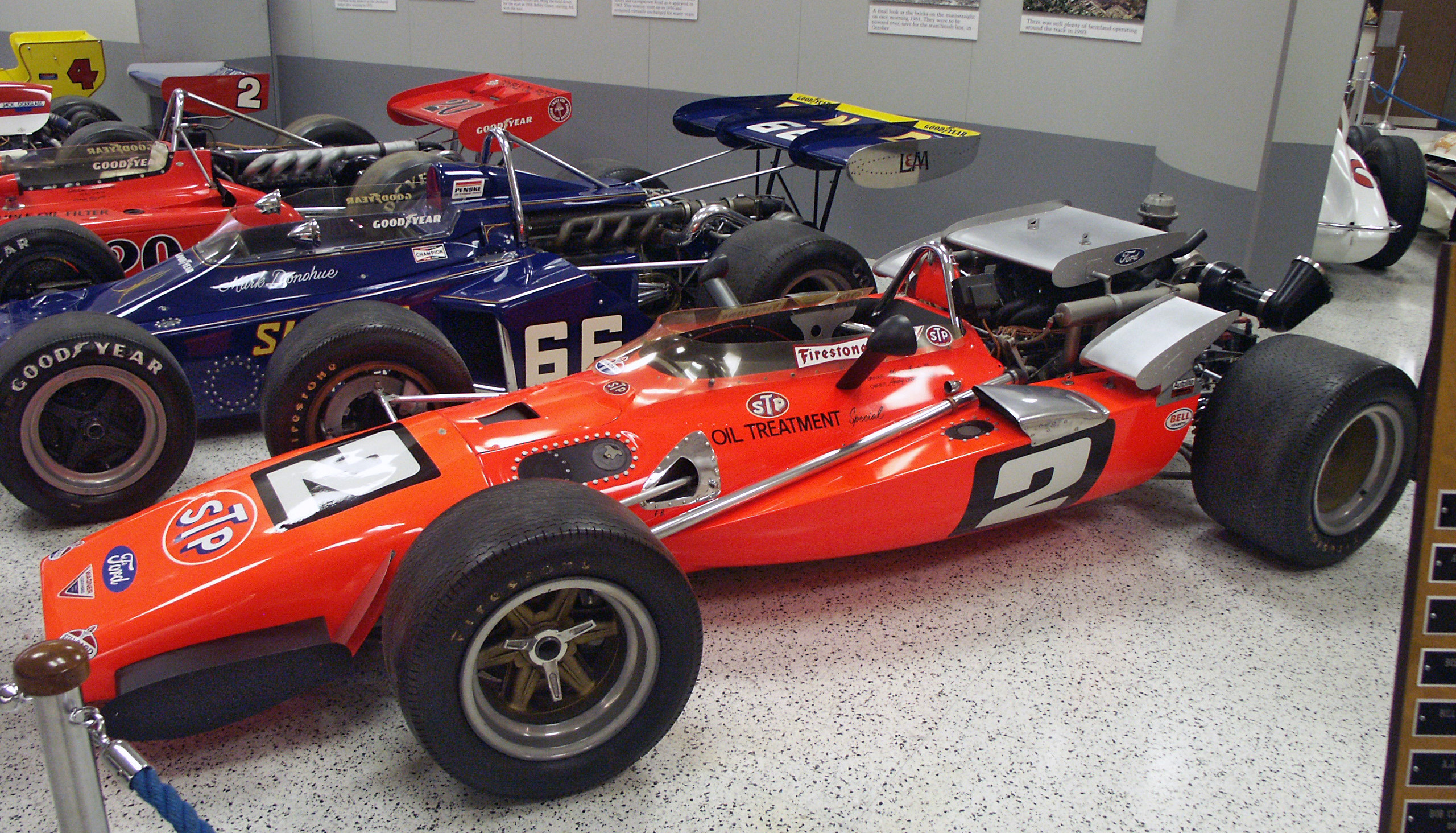
A replica of Mario Andretti's Brawner Hawk, the 1969 Indy 500 winner

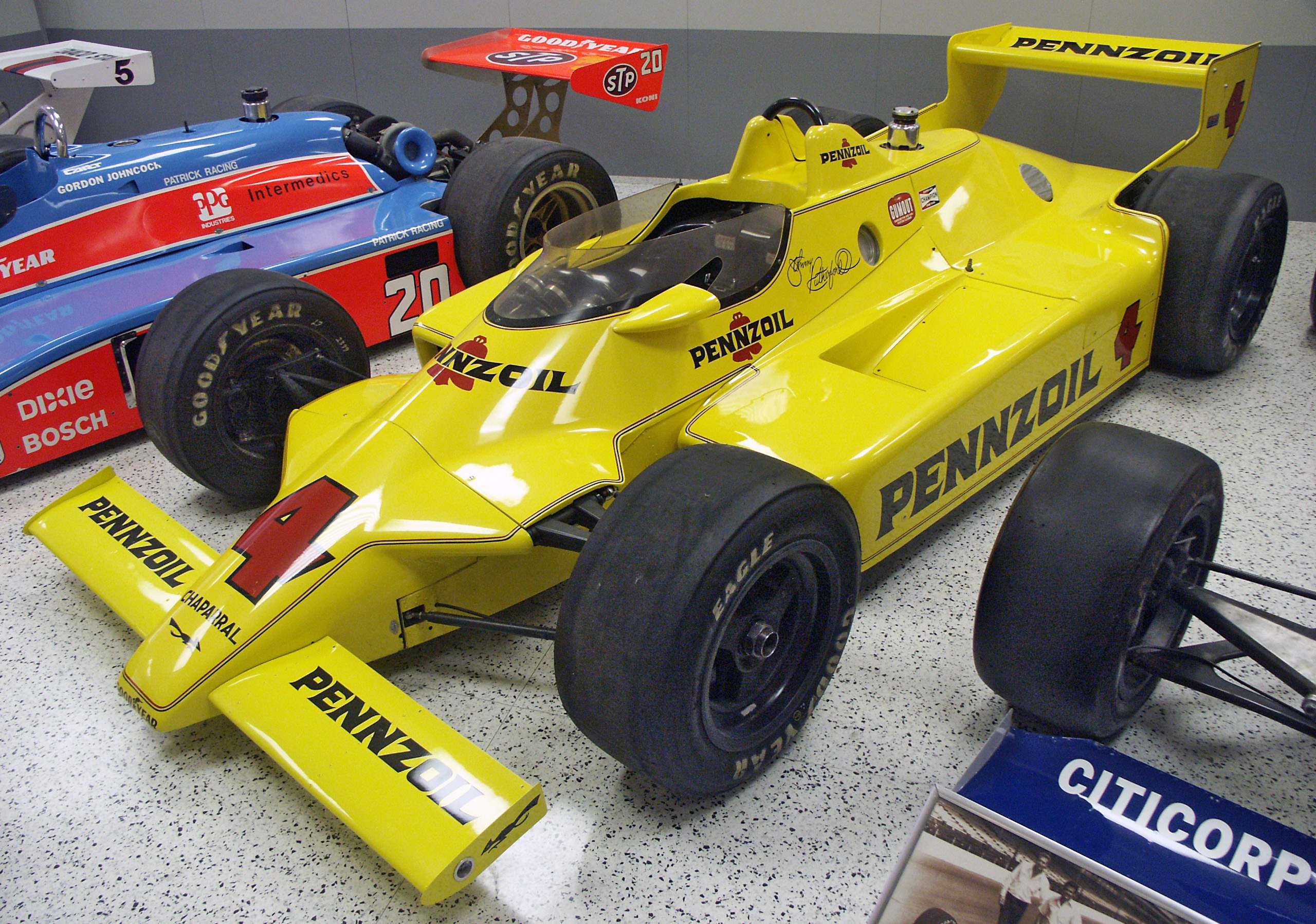
Johnny Rutherford's 1980 pole and race-winning Chaparral 2K

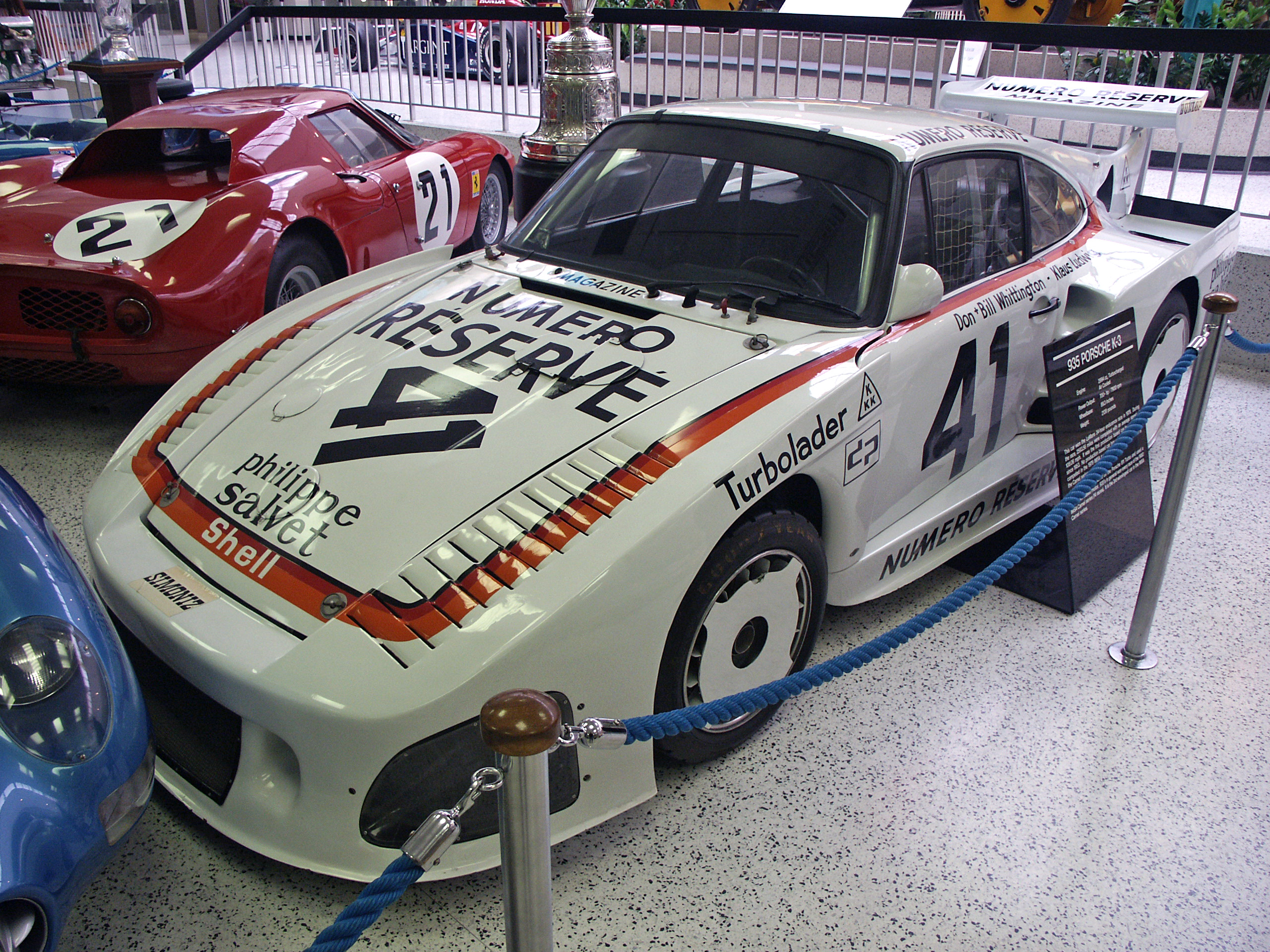
1979 Le Mans winning Porsche 935

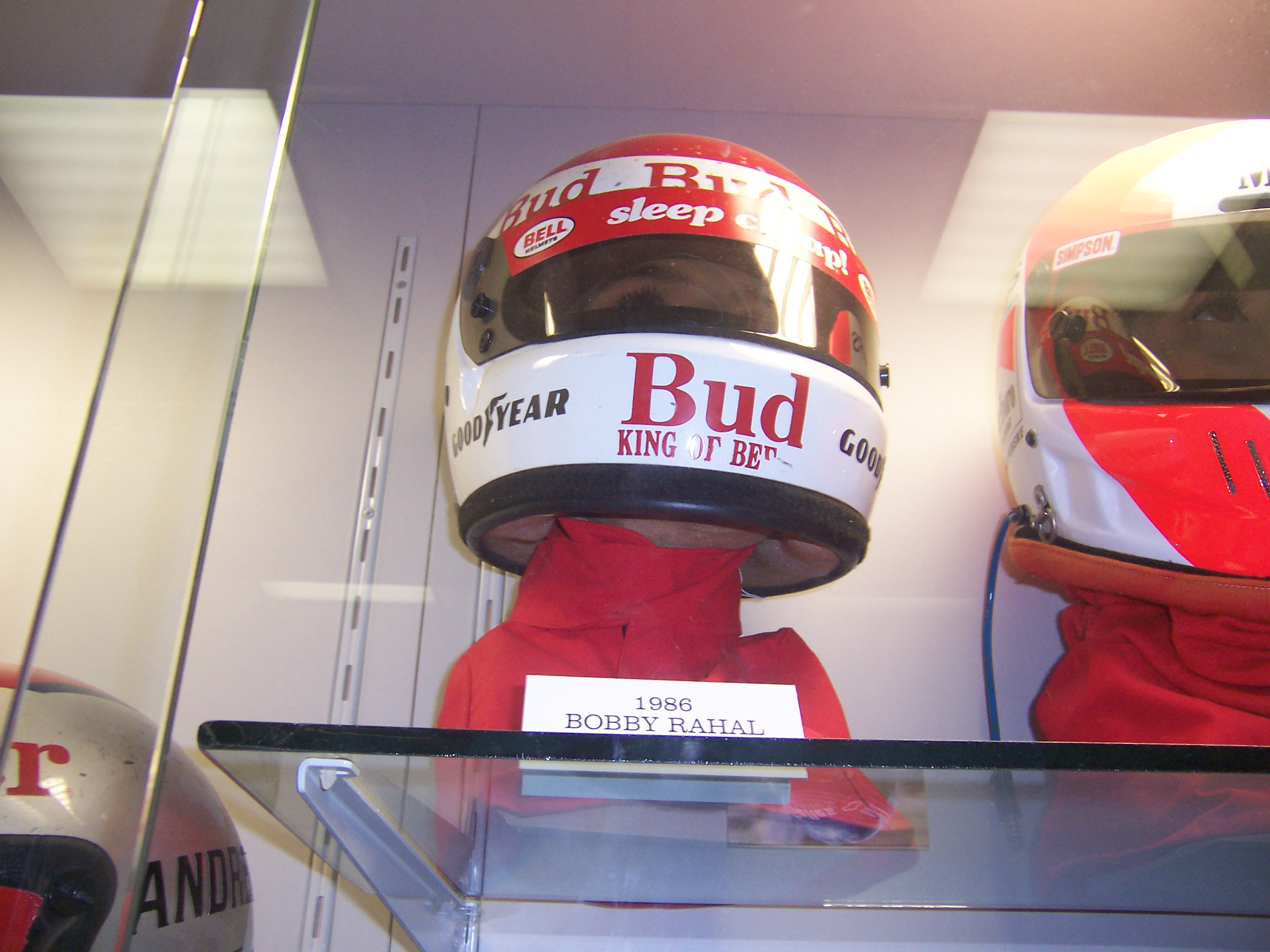
Race-worn helmet of 1986 Indianapolis 500 winner Bobby Rahal on display

== See also ==
- List of automobile museums
- List of museums in Indiana
- List of attractions and events in Indianapolis
- Louis Chevrolet Memorial that sits outside the museum.
