= Fendrick =

Fendrick is a surname. Notable people with the surname include:

- Lauren Fendrick (born 1982), American beach volleyball player

== See also ==
- Fendrich
