= Tony Hulman =

American businessman (1901–1977)

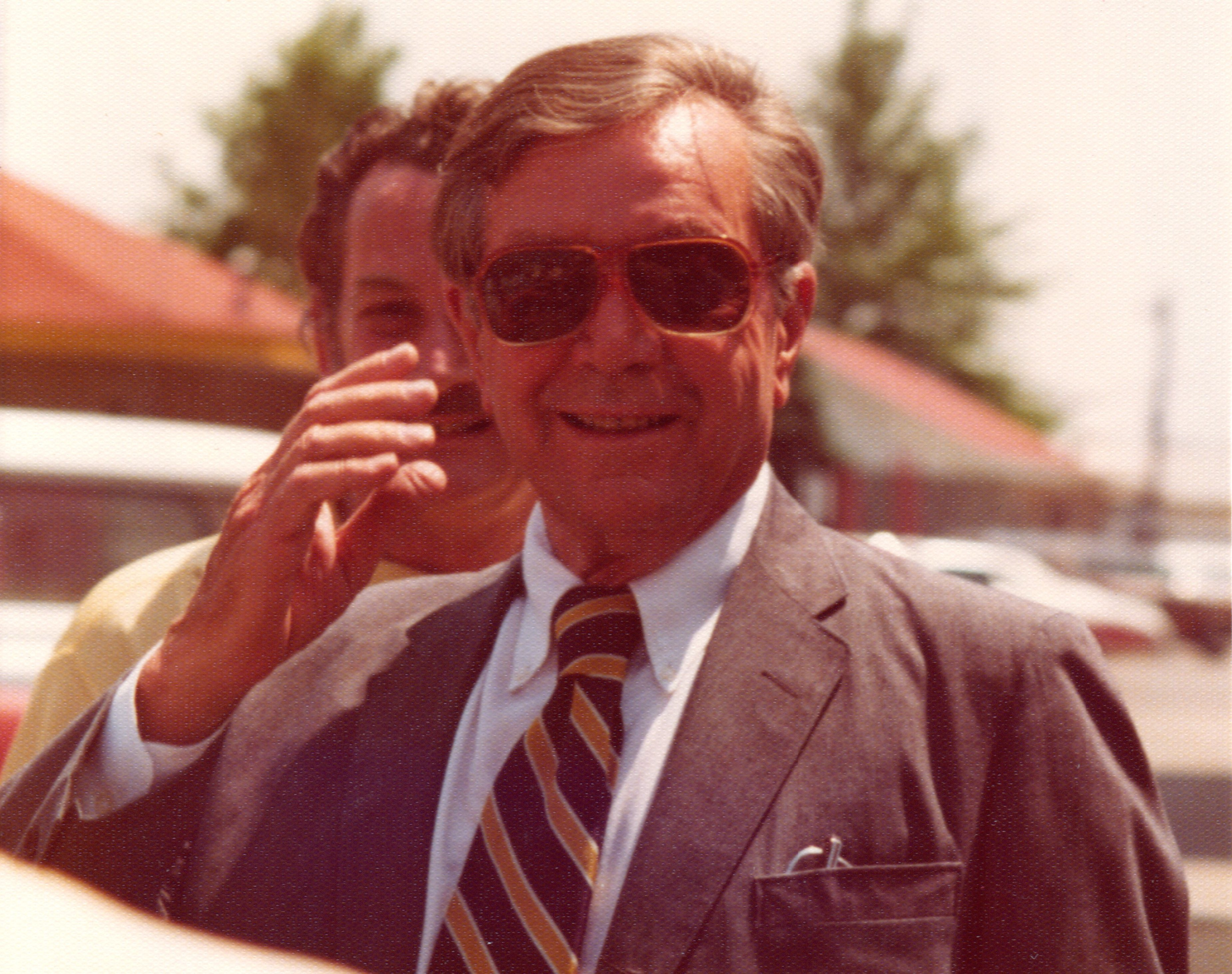
- Tony Hulman at the 59th running of the Indy 500, May 24, 1975.
- Born: February 11, 1901; Terre Haute, Indiana
- Died: October 27, 1977 (aged 76); Indianapolis, Indiana
- Resting place: Calvary Cemetery, Terre Haute; 39.4702988°N 87.3518982°W
- Education: Lawrenceville School, Worcester Academy, Sheffield Scientific School
- Occupation: businessman
- Employer(s): Hulman & Company
- Known for: Clabber Girl; Indianapolis Motor Speedway
- Spouse: Mary Fendrich Hulman
- Children: Mary Antonia Hulman George (Mari) grandchildren Nancy, Josie, Kathi and Tony George

Anton "Tony" Hulman Jr. (February 11, 1901 – October 27, 1977) was an American businessman from Terre Haute, Indiana, who bought the Indianapolis Motor Speedway in 1945 and brought racing back to the famous race course after a four-year hiatus following World War II.

== Early life and entry into the family business ==
Hulman was born in 1901 in Terre Haute. He was educated at St. Benedict's School at Terre Haute, Lawrenceville School in New Jersey and Worcester Academy in Massachusetts. Hulman participated in the high hurdles and the pole vault at Worcester.

Hulman served with the American Red Cross Ambulance Corps during World War I at the age of 17.

Upon graduation from Yale's Sheffield Scientific School in 1924, Hulman returned to Terre Haute to work for Hulman & Company, the family business run by his father Anton Hulman Sr. However, Anton Sr. told his managers, "Don't give Tony a place in the business. Let him work for it."

Despite this, Hulman rose far and fast. By 1926, he was the company's sales manager, and by 1931, at the age of 30, succeeded his father as company president.

== Clabber Girl ==
Hulman's first project was developing a 10-year plan for an ad campaign that would take Clabber Girl's top product, baking powder, to national prominence. Salesmen traveled around the country posting billboards along the roadside and going door-to-door inviting women to try Clabber Girl, which successfully boosted product sales. An original billboard that reads "Five Minutes to Terre Haute, Home of Clabber Girl Baking Powder" and has a clock at the top is still visible along US 40 outside of Terre Haute, Indiana and is considered a local landmark.

== Indianapolis Motor Speedway ==
Hulman is probably best known for buying the dilapidated Indianapolis Motor Speedway from a group led by World War I flying ace Eddie Rickenbacker immediately after World War II, seeing it as a way to promote Clabber Girl. Influenced by three-time Indy 500 winner Wilbur Shaw (who became the track's president in the early years of the Hulman regime), Hulman made numerous improvements to the track in time for the race to be held in 1946.

Following Shaw's death in a plane crash on October 30, 1954, Hulman stepped into his soon-to-be-familiar role as the "face" of the Speedway.

Hulman followed the tradition of launching the Indianapolis 500 with the command, "Gentlemen, start your engines!" Into the 1970s, despite the fact he'd given the command so many times before, he would always practice it extensively beforehand, and on race day, he would invariably pull a card containing the famous words: "Gentlemen, start your engines!" from the pocket of his suit as he stepped to the microphone. Luke Walton, who with Wilbur Shaw had founded the Indianapolis Motor Speedway Radio Network, was for many years a sportscaster and worked annually with Hulman (and later with Mrs. Hulman) to ensure each word was delivered with the proper emphasis.

== Family and philanthropy ==
Hulman married Mary Fendrich, the daughter of Fendrich Cigar Company owner John H. Fendrich, in 1926. Their first child, a daughter named Mary, died just hours after her birth in 1930. In 1934, the couple's second daughter, also named Mary, but better known as "Mari", was born. Mari would later give Tony and Mary four grandchildren. Their sole grandson, Anton Hulman "Tony" George, would carry on the family's racing and business traditions.

The Hulmans were well known in Indiana for their philanthropy and dedication to higher education; Terre Haute's Rose Polytechnic Institute received gifts of millions of dollars over the years. The Hulmans' generosity led the board of Rose Polytechnic to rename the school Rose-Hulman Institute of Technology in the couple's honor in 1971. Indiana State's Hulman Center arena (opened in 1973) and Hulman Memorial Student Union (completed in the mid-1990s) for the couple carry the Hulman name in recognition of the family's donations for their construction. Mari Hulman George established a Center for Equine Studies at Saint Mary-of-the-Woods College, west of Terre Haute.

Terre Haute's Hulman Links public golf course is situated on over 200 acres (0.81 km^{2}) of land donated by Hulman in the early 1970s; however, the course was not completed until after his death.

== Death ==
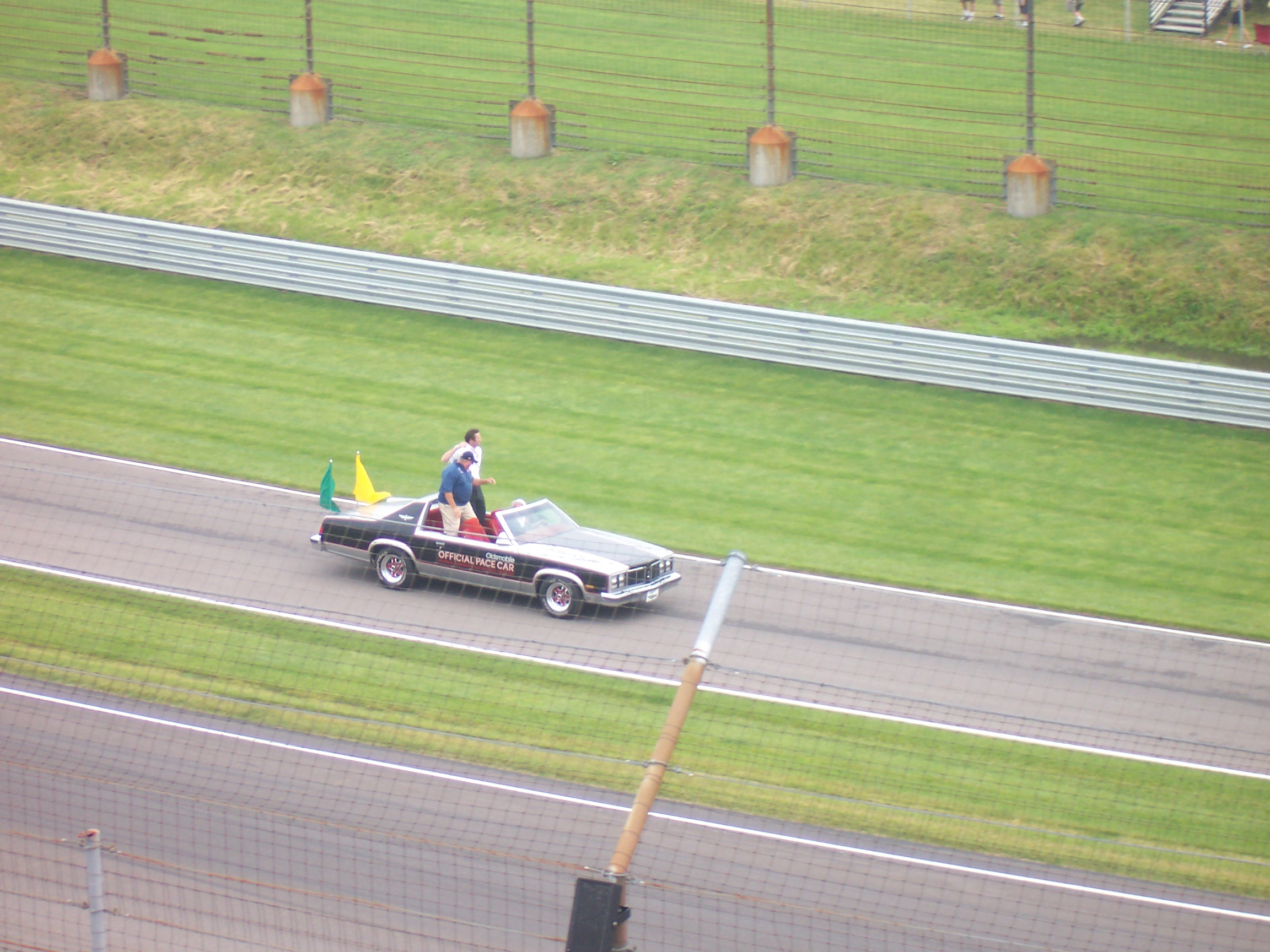
A. J. Foyt and Hulman's grandson Tony George rode together in the 1977 pace car, recreating the scene on the 30th anniversary in 2007.

The 1977 Indianapolis 500 would be memorable for many reasons. A. J. Foyt won his fourth "500" that day, and Foyt invited Hulman to ride with him on the back of the Oldsmobile Delta 88 pace car. The pair were photographed smiling and waving to the fans. It was one of the few, perhaps only, times Hulman had ever ridden on the back of the pace car with the winner; most other times he had sat in the passenger seat. It would be the final time most people saw Hulman publicly.

At 76 years old, Hulman appeared to be in good health; he was always busy maintaining his business interests in Indianapolis and Terre Haute. In mid-October 1977, he hosted the annual Speedway press dinner. A few days later, though, he and his close friend, Hoosier sportscaster Chris Schenkel, were the grand marshals for the Fall Festival parade in nearby Martinsville, Indiana, where Hulman refused Schenkel's offer of his coat in the cool autumn weather. On the night of October 27, 1977, Hulman died of heart failure caused by a ruptured aortic aneurysm on the operating table in St. Vincent's Hospital in Indianapolis. He is buried in Calvary Cemetery, along with other members of his family.

== Honors and awards ==
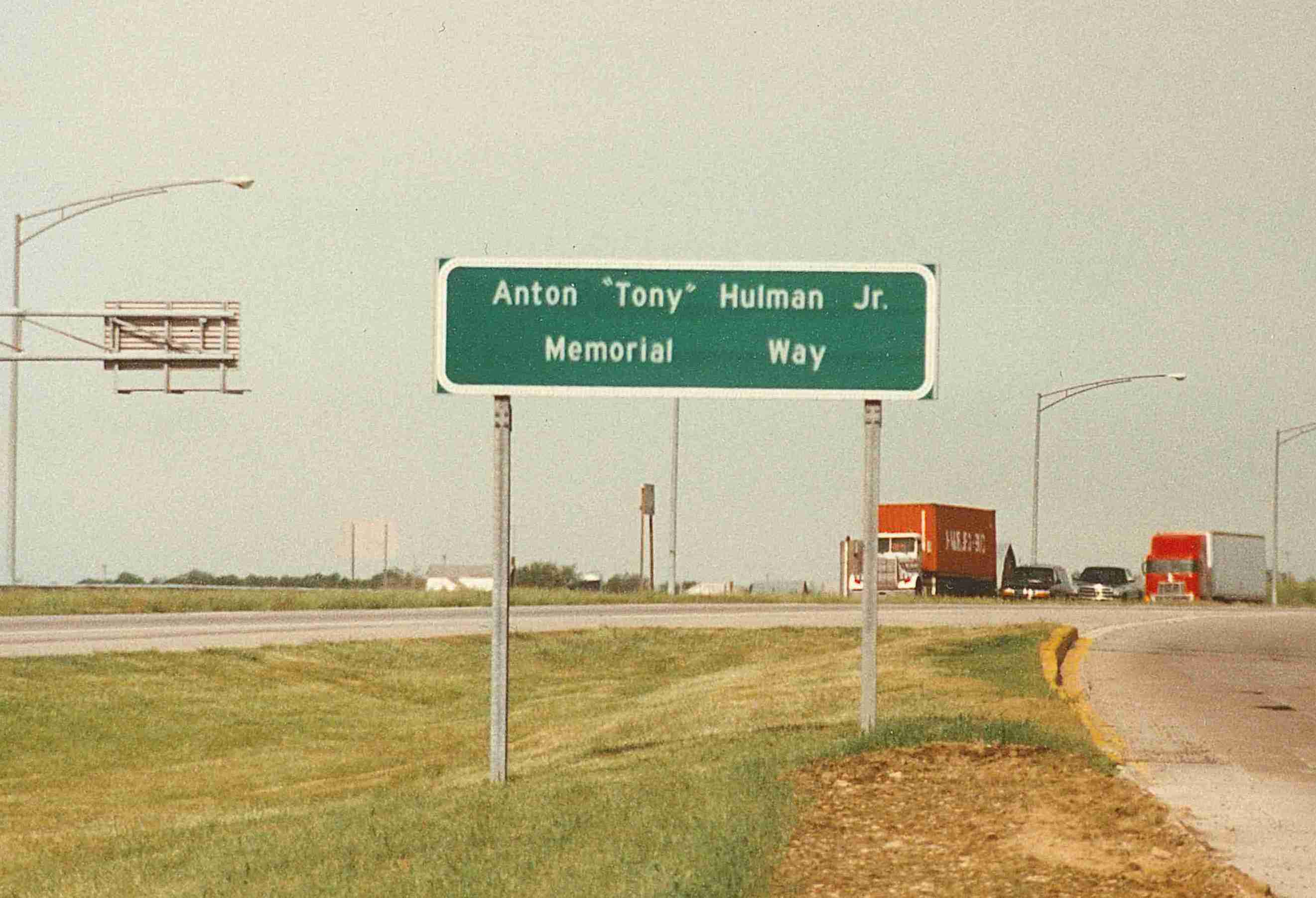
Roadway sign located at a rest stop on Interstate 70 in Indiana depicting the Anton "Tony" Hulman Jr. Memorial Way in 1997.

- Interstate 70 in Indiana is designated the Anton "Tony" Hulman Jr. Memorial Highway.
- Motorsports Hall of Fame of America (1991)
- International Motorsports Hall of Fame (1990)
- Indiana Football Hall of Fame (1976)
- American Academy of Achievement Golden Plate Award (1975)

== Other business interests ==
Hulman went on a buying spree beginning in the 1930s, purchasing a string of Coca-Cola bottling plants across Indiana (which were later consolidated to Indianapolis), utility companies, newspapers, radio and television stations including Terre Haute's WTHI, WTHI-FM and WTHI-TV, and a great deal of real estate.

In recent years, however, as the family has concentrated primarily on the Speedway and racing-related businesses, they have slowly begun to divest themselves of some of Hulman's real estate holdings and "non-core" businesses, such as Wabash Valley Broadcasting, their radio and television holding company, which was sold to Emmis Communications in 1997. Emmis sold WTHI-TV and several of their other television stations to LIN TV Corporation in 2005.

Wabash Valley Broadcasting was originally started by Terre Haute, IN. attorney Raymond J. Kearns, whom was the president of WVB. Shortly after Wabash Valley Broadcasting was incorporated, Anton "Tony" Hulman Jr. became a stockholder. The company (Wabash Valley Broadcasting) started radio station WTHI-AM, which went on air January 1948 as an ABC affiliate. Hulman later headed a small group of men who purchased the holdings of all original shareholders. Hulman & Co. then sold Wabash Valley Broadcasting to Emmis Broadcasting in a $90 million deal, Wabash Valley Broadcasting consisted of television station WTHI, radio stations WTHI-FM, WTHI-AM and WWVR-FM as well as television station WFTX in Fort Myers, FL.

One such property that the family owned for years that became the subject of much speculation and scorn was the land occupied by the former Terre Haute House hotel, which stood at the northeast corner of Seventh Street and Wabash Avenue in Terre Haute (the historic former "Crossroads of America" junction of U.S. Highways 40 and 41). Hulman purchased the hotel in 1959 and closed it to the public in 1970. Noted for the rich and famous (as well as infamous) who stayed there during the hotel's early years, the hotel was the target of numerous attempts at revitalization between 1970 and 2005, with the city of Terre Haute taking a purchase option on the property in 2004 in an effort to finally make something happen. None came to fruition, and in the fall of 2005, the Hulman family (through Terre Haute Realty Corp.) sold the hotel and two other historic buildings to a limited liability corporation, Seventh & Wabash, LLC, owned by Terre Haute developer, Greg Gibson, who demolished the structures for redevelopment. A new hotel, the Hilton Garden Inn – Terre Haute House, opened in the fall of 2007.

== See also ==
- List of ambulance drivers during World War I
