= Fendrich =

Fendrich is a surname. Notable people with the surname include:

- Fredric Fendrich (born 1988), Swedish footballer
- Laurie Fendrich (born 1948), American artist, writer and educator
- Mary Fendrich Hulman (1905–1998), Wife of the late Indiana industrialist Anton "Tony" Hulman, Jr. and matriarch of the Hulman-George family
- Rainhard Fendrich (born 1955), Austrian singer, composer, entertainer and actor

== See also ==
- Fendrich Cigar Company, Cigar factory in Evansville, Indiana
