= Mary Fendrich Hulman =

American businesswoman

- Born: March 13, 1905; Evansville, Indiana
- Died: April 10, 1998 (aged 93); Indianapolis, Indiana
- Resting place: Calvary Cemetery, Terre Haute; 39.4702988°N 87.3518982°W
- Employer(s): Hulman & Company
- Spouse: Tony Hulman (m. 1926; died 1977)
- Children: Mary Antonia Hulman George (Mari) grandchildren Nancy, Josie, Kathi and Tony George

Mary Fendrich Hulman (March 13, 1905 – April 10, 1998) was the wife of the late Indiana industrialist Anton "Tony" Hulman Jr. and matriarch of the Hulman-George family that controlled Hulman & Company.

== Early life ==
She was born March 13, 1905, in Evansville, Indiana. Hulman was the only child of Fendrich Cigar Company president John H. Fendrich and Nettie Buttriss Fendrich. The Fendrich family was among Evansville's prominent Catholic families; Mary attended Catholic schools.

== Marriage and family ==
Mary met Tony Hulman in the early 1920s in Atlantic City, where both families summered. On October 6, 1926, the couple married in a lavish ceremony in Evansville.

The couple settled in Terre Haute, Indiana following a European honeymoon. Tony became sales manager of Hulman & Co., while Mary set up housekeeping in the city's Farrington's Grove neighborhood.

Their first child, Mary, was born in Evansville in 1930, but died shortly after birth. On December 26, 1934, the couple's daughter Mary (Mari Hulman George), was born. She died November 3, 2018.

== Sporting ==
Mary played golf and shot skeet competitively.

When Tony purchased the Indianapolis Motor Speedway in 1945, she chose to play an active role each year at the race.

== Philanthropy ==
In the early 1970s, the Hulmans donated land and a "challenge grant" of $2.5M (25% of the estimated construction cost) for the construction of Indiana State University's Hulman Center arena and the city of Terre Haute's public Hulman Links golf course.

Mary became a major contributor to art museums and schools; particularly the Sheldon Swope Art Museum in Terre Haute and the Indianapolis Museum of Art, along with Saint Mary-of-the-Woods College and other institutions of higher learning. Mary donated $3.5 million to the Indianapolis Museum of Art at Newfields, and, in 1990, the Mary Fendrich Hulman Pavilion opened.

== Later life ==
When Tony Hulman died on October 27, 1977, she became the chairman of both the Speedway and Hulman & Co. After his death, Mary took over one of Tony's traditional roles during the Indianapolis 500. She voiced the famous line of "Gentlemen, start your engines!" She would continue to give the command (with few exceptions, when daughter Mari delivered it) through 1996

In 1986, Forbes magazine named Mary to the list of the 400 wealthiest Americans, worth nearly $180 million at that time. With her vast wealth, Mary continued to donate to various institutions and charities in her later years.

As her health declined in the 1990s, Mary gradually relinquished her roles to her daughter and grandchildren and finally moved from the family's longtime Terre Haute home to Marquette Manor Retirement Community in Indianapolis.

== Death ==
Mary Fendrich Hulman died from complications due to emphysema on April 10, 1998, at age 93. Following her funeral in the church where Tony Hulman's funeral was held 20 years earlier, she was buried by his side in Terre Haute's Calvary Cemetery.

== Sources ==
- Associated Press article on the occasion of Hulman's death
