= Mari Hulman George =

American heiress and philanthropist

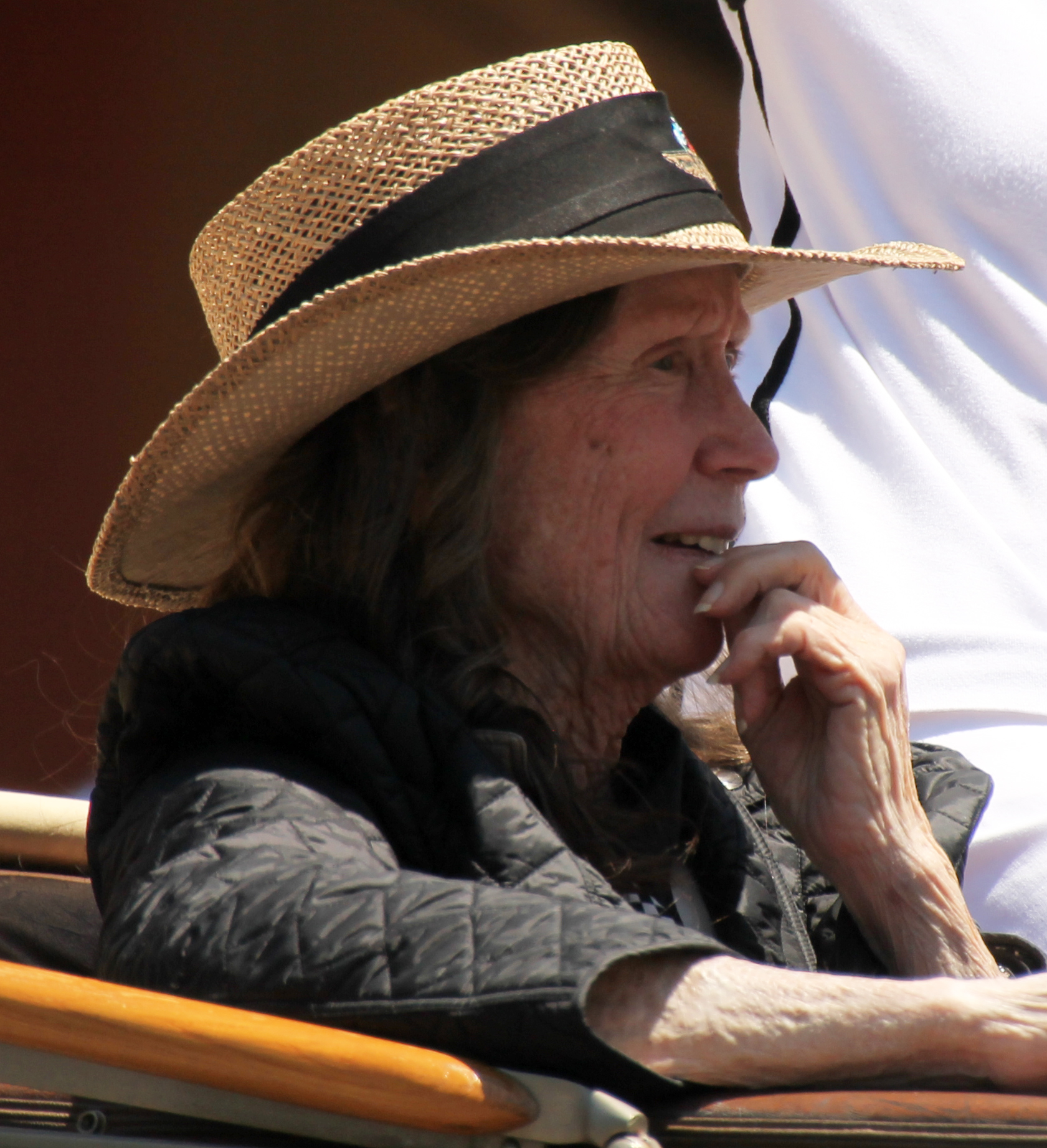
- Mari Hulman George 2015 Indianapolis 500
- Born: Mary Antonia Hulman; December 26, 1934; Evansville, Indiana, U.S.
- Died: November 3, 2018 (aged 83); Indianapolis, Indiana, U.S.
- Education: St. Mary-of-the-Woods College
- Employers: Indianapolis Motor Speedway; Hulman & Company
- Spouse: Elmer George (1957–1976)
- Children: Anton "Tony" Hulman George
- Parent(s): Anton "Tony" Hulman and Mary Fendrich Hulman
- Relatives: Kyle Krisiloff (grandson)

Mary Antonia "Mari" Hulman George (December 26, 1934 – November 3, 2018) was the daughter of Anton "Tony" Hulman and Mary Fendrich Hulman, prominent Indiana philanthropists and business owners. She was the chairperson of the Indianapolis Motor Speedway from 1988 to 2016, and also of Hulman & Company.

== Family ==
Mari was the Hulmans' only child, but from the age of eleven she was often surrounded by the families of Indianapolis 500 drivers, whom she befriended. She married one such driver, Elmer George, on April 29, 1957. At 22 years of age, she became stepmother to Elmer's children from his first marriage, and the couple would go on to have four children together: three daughters, Nancy, Josie, and Kathi; and one son, Anton Hulman George, who, like his namesake grandfather, would be better known as "Tony."

Elmer George, who met with little success as a driver, retired from racing in 1963. He later became a Speedway vice-president and head of the IMS Radio Network. For most of the couple's marriage, they owned a farm outside of Terre Haute, but spent much of their time at their 1,300-acre (526 ha) ranch in Wyoming.

Mari filed for divorce from Elmer in May 1976. Only four weeks after this, Elmer was shot multiple times and killed by Guy Trollinger, the family's horse trainer and Mari's alleged boyfriend, after an argument at Elmer and Mari's ranch in Terre Haute late at night on the day of that year's Indianapolis 500.

On November 3, 2018, Indianapolis Motor Speedway announced that Mari Hulman George had died.

== Chairperson ==
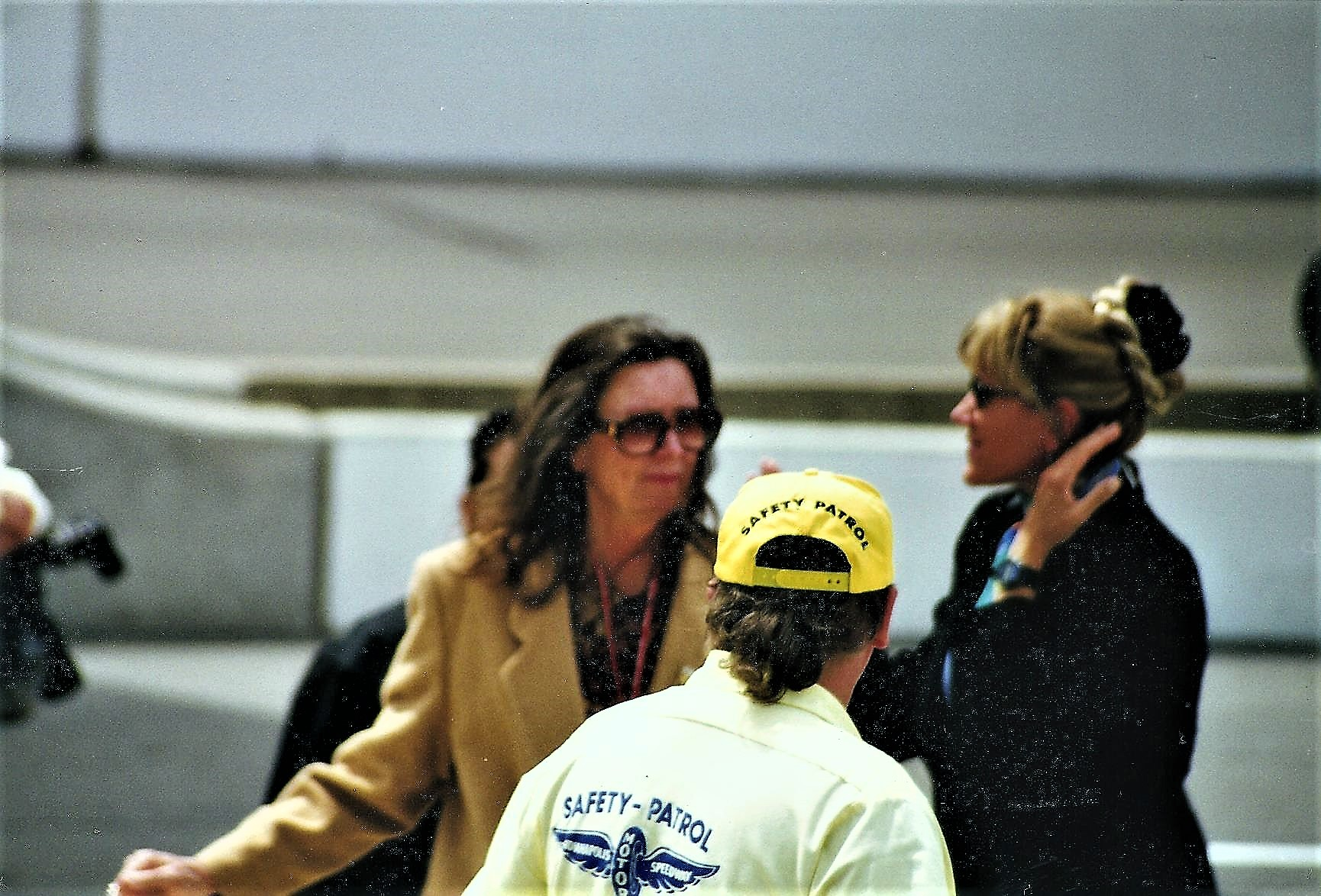
Mari Hulman George at the 1997 Indianapolis 500

After the death of Tony Hulman in 1977, his widow Mary F. Hulman (Mari's mother) was named the chairperson of the board of directors of the Indianapolis Motor Speedway and Hulman & Co., the family's primary business. Mari Hulman George was named to the position of vice president and board member. When Mary F. Hulman's health began to decline, she retired and was named chairman emeritus, a position she held until her death in 1998. The chairmanship of the companies was passed to Mari Hulman George in 1988. Mari Hulman George held those positions until the summer of 2016. Shortly after the 2016 Indianapolis 500, Mari was facing declining health and was elected chairman emeritus of the family companies. At that same time, her son Tony George was elevated to the chairman position.

Like her father and mother before her, from 1997 to 2015 Mari officially started the Indianapolis 500 and Brickyard 400 races with the famous starting command, "(Ladies and) Gentlemen, start your engines!" In 2014, she was joined by Jim Nabors, and for the 100th running of the Indianapolis 500 in 2016, she was joined by the entire Hulman/George family. Mari had also given the command as a substitute for her mother in 1981.

== Philanthropist and lover of animals ==
Like her parents, Mari Hulman George is well known throughout Indiana for her generosity to institutions of higher learning, with her alma mater, St. Mary-of-the-Woods College in Saint Mary-of-the-Woods, Indiana among the top beneficiaries. The college maintains the Mari Hulman George School of Equine Studies, founded in part due to her love of horses.

In 2001, the Indiana Department of Homeland Security renamed their search-and-rescue training area at Camp Atterbury the Mari Hulman George Search and Rescue Training Center, in recognition of her contributions to the care of animals displaced and otherwise affected by disasters. She has also been active in the rescue and adoption of racing greyhounds.
