= Clabber Girl =

American brand of baking ingredients

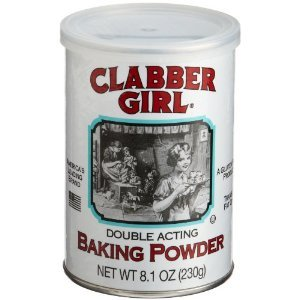
- Clabber Girl brand baking powder
- Founded: 1923
- Founder: Hulman & Company
- Products: Clabber Girl Baking Powder
- Website: http://www.clabbergirl.com

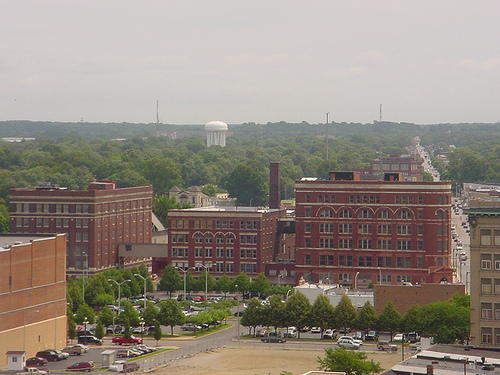
Clabber Girl factory in Terre Haute, Indiana

Clabber Girl is an American brand of baking powder, containing monocalcium phosphate, anhydrous sodium aluminum sulfate, baking soda, and corn starch. Originally owned and manufactured by Hulman & Company, which also owned and operated the Indianapolis Motor Speedway and INDYCAR, it was sold in 2019 to B&G Foods. The brand also owns the Rumford, Davis, Hearth Club and Royal brands of retail baking powder, baking soda and corn starch, and the Royal brand of dessert mixes. The Clabber Girl name brand comes from the word "clabber", a type of sour milk. In the early 1800s, people mixed clabber with pearl ash, soda, cream of tartar, and a few other ingredients to make what we know today as baking powder. The first baking powder brand by Hulman and company was the "Milk Brand". In 1899, it was changed to the "Clabber Brand". In 1923, the company changed the name to "Clabber Girl".

According to the official website, the girl on the front of the can dates back to its 1899 debut, when the product was originally called Clabber Baking Powder. "An artist was commissioned to provide a sketch of the girl, which is on display in the Clabber Girl Museum. The truth is, no one knows if the artist used a model or just came up with the Clabber Girl. The Clabber Girl has had a few different looks over the years, but her appearance has remained the same since 1940 when highlights were added to her hair."

== NASCAR sponsorship ==
Clabber Girl sponsored driver Stevie Reeves in the NASCAR Busch Series from 1994 to 1996, where he picked up two top tens and a pole.
