= Tony George =

American auto racing executive

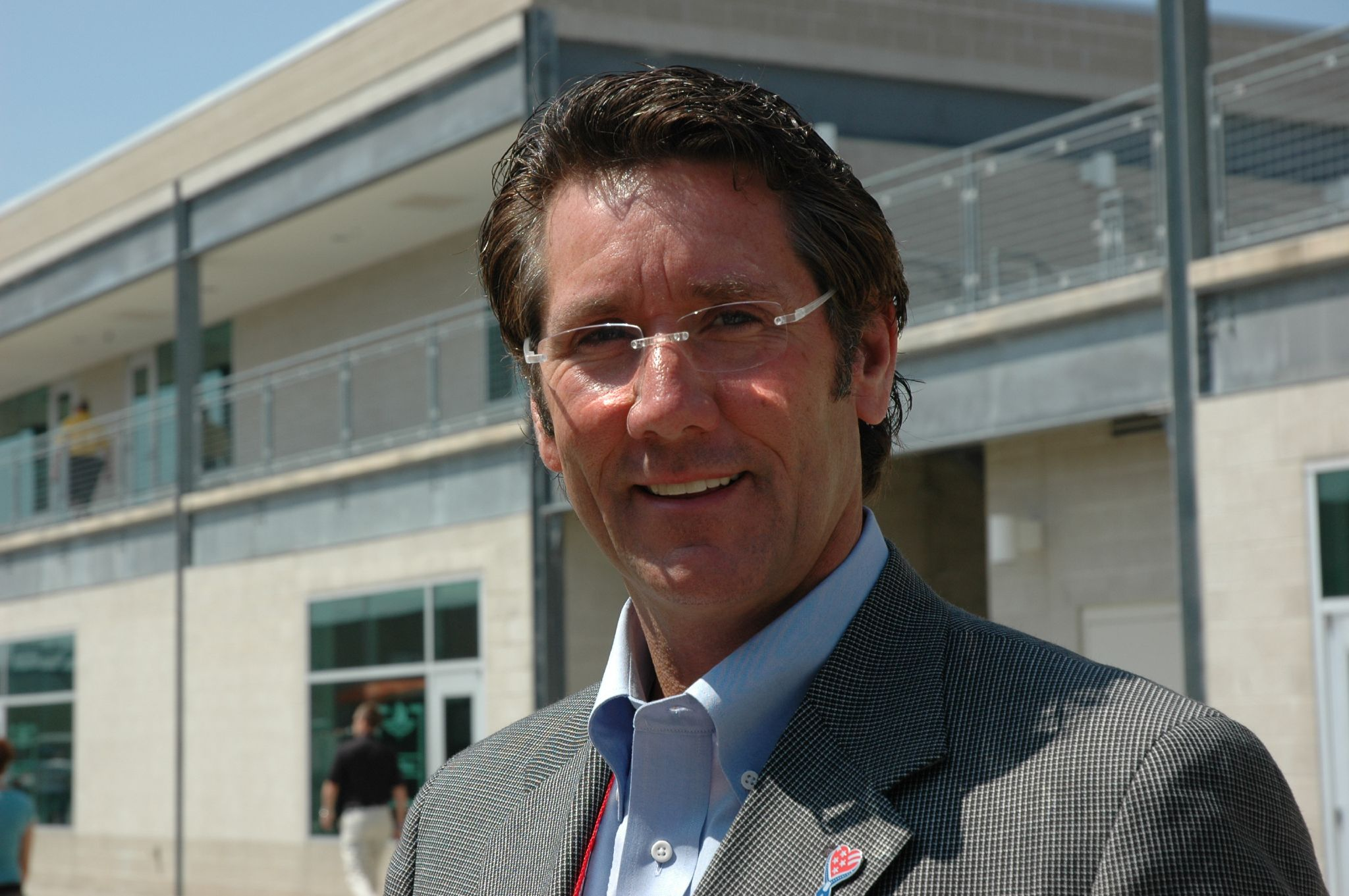
- George in 2007
- Born: Anton Hulman George; December 30, 1959 (age 66); Indiana, U.S.
- Education: Indiana State University

Anton Hulman "Tony" George (born December 30, 1959) is the former Chairman, President, and CEO of the Indianapolis Motor Speedway and Hulman & Company, serving from 1989 to 2009. He was also formerly on the Board of Directors of both entities. He founded the Indy Racing League and co-owned Vision Racing and currently co-owns Ed Carpenter Racing.

George is the grandson of Tony Hulman, who purchased the Indianapolis Motor Speedway at the end of World War II, and Mary Fendrich Hulman. He is the son of Mari Hulman George. George is a former driver, having competed in the 1989 Indy Lights championship, finishing 12th in points and capturing five top-tens.

== Indianapolis Motor Speedway Leadership ==
Tony George became president and CEO of the Indianapolis Motor Speedway Corporation after the death of Joe Cloutier in 1989.

During his first few years as Speedway head, he oversaw new projects such as an infield road-circuit, Tower Terrace Suites, pit lane reconstruction (including the addition of a warm-up lane requested by many influential Speedway alumni), and a control tower.

Before George's arrival, the Indianapolis Motor Speedway (or "the Speedway") traditionally had only one race: the Indianapolis 500. He changed that with the announcement that a NASCAR race would be held at the Speedway. The Brickyard 400 made its debut on August 6, 1994, with Jeff Gordon taking the checkered flag.

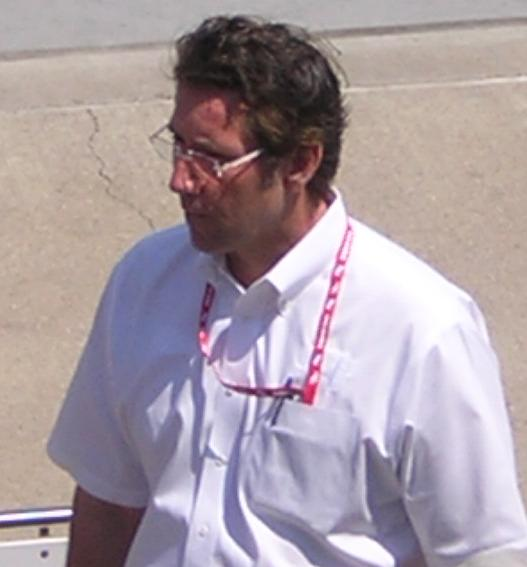
Tony George at the 2007 Indianapolis 500

In 1998, the IROC series came to the track, to little fanfare, and less success.

George helped bring Formula One back to the U.S. with the United States Grand Prix held at the Speedway in 2000. This project involved building a road course inside the oval. The inaugural event in 2000 set an F1 attendance record. Controversy surrounded the 2005 United States Grand Prix, where only 6 of the 20 cars took the green due to problems with Michelin tires, which likely damaged the reputation of the event and the F1 in general in the American market. Michael Schumacher became the first driver to win five races at the Indianapolis Motor Speedway by winning the 2006 race on July 2. Lewis Hamilton won the 2007 event, which turned out to be the last running. George and Formula 1 boss Bernie Ecclestone could not reach an agreement to continue the US Grand Prix at the Brickyard for 2008 and beyond.

The Speedway hosted its first MotoGP event in 2008. The motorcycles could not safely race through the banked turns at high speed, so a portion of the infield was plowed and paved to provide a bypass to Turn 13 of the original road course.

George resigned on June 30, 2009, as President and CEO of IMS and Hulman & Company claiming it to be so he could focus more time on the Indy Racing League. It has been reported that while George's mother Mari Hulman George (who is also chairman of the board) supported him, his sisters (who are the other directors) wanted him out. The board also rejected George's request to continue funding Vision Racing. George had spent hundreds of millions of dollars on IRL teams, drivers, entry fees, marketing plans, airplanes, personnel and his own team. However, the IRL has been said to be continually losing money, and after the estimated $60 million overhaul of the Speedway to accommodate Formula One in 2000, George's sisters, Nancy George, Josie George and Kathi Conforti-George, voiced their concern to their mother over the spending habits of their brother, finally convincing Mari Hulman George to take unchecked power away from him in June 2009.

In January 2010, George resigned from the board of directors. In February 2011, however, George again became a director of Hulman & Company when the board was expanded. At a July 2016 NASCAR event at the Indianapolis Motor Speedway, Tony George was described as Chairman of the Board of Hulman & Company, which owns IMS and the IndyCar Series.

== "The Split" ==
In the 1990s, CART IndyCar Racing faced several criticisms. Costs to field an IndyCar team had risen tremendously. The high costs meant drivers were often paying to obtain a place in the series, leaving talented drivers unemployed. Talented sprint car racers like Jeff Gordon had long competed in Indy car racing but were now choosing NASCAR instead. The CART board of directors was composed of car-owners and excluded other stakeholders in their decision making. The process to obtain engines for a team was increasingly political and cost upwards of $1 million. The schedule was saturated with road course and street circuits which George believed to be less exciting to watch than oval tracks. Owing in part to those criticisms, by the beginning of the decade, NASCAR was viewed as America's most popular form of motorsports instead of IndyCar racing.

Shortly after resigning from the CART Board of Directors, George announced in March 1994 the creation of the Indy Racing League, which began racing in 1996. He claimed to create the IRL to challenge the already established CART series, and to encourage a more even playing field in open wheel racing. He claimed he wanted a series to run entirely on oval tracks, making it distinct from CART, which raced on road and street courses in addition to short ovals and superspeedways. George angered many CART participants by requiring 25 of the 33 spots in the Indianapolis 500 to be occupied by drivers in the IRL circuit. This meant that CART could not hold the Indianapolis 500 as a points scoring event on their calendar as not enough teams would be allowed to compete and earn points. CART decided to stage their own race on the same day, the U.S. 500 at Michigan International Speedway. Due to the lack of participation from the established CART teams, most of the biggest names did not enter the Indianapolis 500 for several years. Tony George became a figure of derision among some racing fans, and he is blamed for open wheel racing losing fans, sponsors and drivers to NASCAR.

George was successful in increasing the visibility of Indianapolis Motor Speedway. The Indy 500 remains one of the highlights of the IRL race season and maintained a strong attendance. George also attracted NASCAR and Formula One (from 2000 to 2007) to Indianapolis. In 2008, the MotoGP series added the oval circuit to its schedule. However the IndyCar series had trouble drawing fans, plus it lost IndyCar drivers to NASCAR such as Sam Hornish, Dario Franchitti, and Danica Patrick. Despite the absorption of the Champ Car World Series (the successor to CART) to IndyCar series, the merged series is nowhere as popular or commercially successful as CART in the early 1990s.

== Indy Racing League ==
The Indy Racing League was founded in 1994 and began racing in 1996 claiming to offer a cost-effective, all-oval alternative to the PPG CART Indycar World Series. The basic beliefs behind the creation of the series were:

- Cost controlled racing
- Driver Safety
- All-oval schedule
- Give a better opportunity for American drivers to succeed in motorsports and compete at the Indianapolis 500, particularly USAC drivers whose numerical representation at the 500 had dwindled.

However, as the series evolved, it moved away from these principles, with more foreign drivers, increased costs and, eventually, racing on road courses and street circuits.

The IRL struggled initially, until CART faced financial turmoil and CART teams began to return to the Indianapolis 500 in 2000. The concern over CART's future, financial stability, and the attraction to the sponsorship draw of the Indy 500 saw teams slowly moving over to the IRL from 2001 to 2003.

CART declared bankruptcy in the 2003 off season. George made a bid for certain assets of the company, while a trio of CART owners (Gerald Forsythe, Paul Gentilozzi, and Kevin Kalkhoven), along with Dan Pettit, also made a bid, calling their group the Open Wheel Racing Series (OWRS). George's offer was to purchase only select company assets, in an effort to eliminate any series that would rival his Indy Racing League. However, if George's bid (which was actually higher than the OWRS bid) had been successful, many vendors that were still owed money by CART would have not been paid. Therefore, a judge ruled that the OWRS group should be the purchaser of CART, which ensured a 25th anniversary season in 2004, running as Champ Car. Open Wheel Racing Series. (OWRS) would later change its name to Champ Car World Series (CCWS) LLC.

Prior to 2003 the IRL was unable to use the term "IndyCar" since that was licensed to CART. In 1992, The Speedway trademarked the term "IndyCar" which had been widely used by CART in championship branding and promotion. The Speedway then leased the term to CART through 1997. With the inception of the IRL, a lawsuit, and a six-year non-use agreement, formal use of the term disappeared. Widespread confusion ensued with CART still competing at "Indy" branded events in Canada and Australia, and both CART/Champ Car and IRL cars being popularly referred to as "IndyCars". In 2003 the non-use agreement expired and the IRL was able to adopt the recognized IndyCar moniker once again, thereafter becoming the IRL IndyCar Series.

Road courses entered the IRL schedule in 2005. Adding road courses added significant costs to the increasingly expensive league, because modifications to the chassis and engines (which were initially designed solely for the stresses of oval racing) would be required. This caused much criticism of George, and debate amongst fans, some of whom argued it went against what the IRL was founded. The fans opined that oval racing was more exciting than road and street racing, better represented the heritage of open-wheel, paid homage to the Indianapolis 500, was more cost effective and better allotted American drivers with the opportunity of success in open-wheel racing. The other side of the debate argued it was best for the IRL to adopt more road racing, and become similar to CART, the series that saw American open-wheel racing reach its peak (popularity, manufacturer and sponsor interest) with a diverse schedule, technical package, manufacturer involvement, and large costs. In addition, Champ Car, the successor to CART, had failed at providing as diverse a schedule as in the CART era. Becoming CART-like in its season schedule was suggested as a way to help grow the IRL fan base.

In 2005, George stepped down from his operational duties in the IRL to start his own team, Vision Racing, with his wife Laura George and actor Patrick Dempsey. The team was formed from the remnants of Kelley Racing, which disbanded after the 2004 season. George's stepson, Ed Carpenter, began driving for the team in 2005. Vision Racing shut down operations on January 28, 2009, due to a lack of sponsorship.

On February 22, 2008, the IRL and Champ Car World Series signed a deal to unify the two open-wheel American circuits, bringing them under the umbrella of the IRL IndyCar Series. A statement was released by the two sides, saying, "Owners of Champ Car and the Indy Racing League completed an agreement in principle Friday that will unify the sport for 2008."

Champ Car liquidated its assets and the IRL bought almost all of them, thereby allowing the unification of IndyCar and Champ Car on track for 2008, as well as officially unifying the history of American Championship Car Racing.

Many commentators, such as Gordon Kirby, suggest that George's actions at the head of the Indianapolis Motor Speedway and in creating the IRL to rival the then-dominant CART led to a sharp decline in popularity of open-wheel racing in the United States as it split the fanbase, and gave a significant boost to the national popularity of NASCAR.
