= Fendrich Cigar Company =

Former cigar factory in Evansville, Indiana, US,

Fendrich Cigar Company (also known as La Fendrich and, more correctly H. Fendrich) was a cigar factory in Evansville, Indiana, founded and owned by notable Fendrich family. The factory was shut in 1969.

== Cigar brands ==
The Fendrich Company made the following brands: La Fendrich, Charles Denby, Diamond Joe, Little Fendrich, Smoke Dreams, Red Ruby, John Jenning, Lady Carmen, Mrs. Fiske, El Cuto, Five Brothers, Little Gun, Casa Nova, Globe-Democrat, Courier Journal, La Cubavana, Aaron Burr, Black Hawk and many more.

== History of the company ==
In 1833 the Fendrich family immigrated to Baltimore from the Margraviate of Baden in the Holy Roman Empire (today's Germany). The Germanic principalities from whence they came had a history of cigar making. In the 1840s Fendrich brothers Joseph, Karl (Charles), Franz (Francis) and Herrmann started the tobacco and cigar business. In 1855 the company headquarters moved to 21 Main St. in Evansville. New factory complex opened in 1912, and Fendrich Cigar Company had around 1,500 employees at that time.

== See also ==
- List of cigar brands
