= Hulman & Company =

American company

Hulman & Co.
- Company type: Private
- Industry: Food
- Founded: 1850
- Defunct: 2019
- Headquarters: Terre Haute, Indiana, United States
- Key people: Tony George (Chairman); Mark Miles (CEO)
- Subsidiaries: Wabash Valley Broadcasting

Hulman & Company was an American private, family-owned, company founded in 1850 by Francis T. Hulman as a wholesale foods supplier of groceries, tobacco, and liquor, headquartered in Terre Haute, Indiana. Throughout the early half of the 20th century, Hulman & Co. became nationally known for its Clabber Girl baking powder which it began producing in 1899. In 1945, the company purchased the Indianapolis Motor Speedway, in what many thought was an unusual investment for a company with a rich history in the food and beverage industry and owned the speedway until its sale to Roger Penske in 2019.

== Company history ==
=== Origins ===
Herman Hulman Sr. (1831–1913)

In 1850, Francis T. Hulman, a native of Lingen, Germany, emigrated to the United States, settling in Terre Haute, Indiana, where he established a small grocery store. The small company proved successful and in 1854, Francis Hulman sent over for his younger brother, Herman Hulman Sr., who had himself been working in the grocery business in the German town of Osnabrück.

The brothers would work together as partners in the wholesale grocery business until in 1858, when Francis and his entire family died at sea aboard the SS Austria, which sank en route to Germany. Herman Hulman thereafter assumed control of the growing and prospering firm.

In 1870, Hulman formed a partnership with Robert S. Cox, previously a main competitor in the wholesale grocery business, with the firm changing its name to Hulman & Cox. During this period, the firm incidentally employed future Socialist Presidential candidate Eugene V. Debs, himself the son of Terre Haute grocers, as a warehouse worker and clerk for five years, with Debs leaving to pursue a political career as elected Terre Haute city clerk in 1879.

Hulman purchased the McGregor & Co. distillery of Terre Haute shortly after forming his partnership with Cox, greatly enlarging the capacity and sales of the firm. He sold the firm in 1875 to Crawford Fairbanks and returned for a visit to Germany, rebuying a half interest upon his return, with the distillery operating as Hulman & Fairbanks for a time. This half interest was then traded to Robert Cox for his share of the Hulman & Cox operation in 1879.

Herman Hulman conducted the business without a partner from 1879 until 1884, formally establishing the firm under the name Hulman & Company in that latter year. Herman Hulman took a new generation in the persons of B. G. Cox and Anton Hulman into partnership in the firm in 1886.

The firm continued to grow until its location at the corner of Fifth Street and Wabash Avenue was outgrown. A new facility was constructed, a vast, multi-story building occupying an entire city block, which was opened with tours and a celebratory banquet attended by more than 2,000 people in September 1893.

In May 2019, Hulman & Company sold Clabber Girl to B&G Foods for $80 million. In November 2019, Hulman & Company sold the Indianapolis Motor Speedway and IndyCar for a reported $300 million to the Penske Corporation.
