= Jack Link's 500 =

Auto race held at Talladega, United States

NASCAR Cup Series
- Venue: Talladega Superspeedway
- Location: Talladega, Alabama, United States
- Corporate sponsor: Jack Link's
- First race: 1970
- Distance: 500.08 miles (804.80 km)
- Laps: 188; Stage 1: 98; Stages 2 & 3: 45 each
- Previous names: Alabama 500 (1970); Winston 500 (1971–1993, 1997); Winston Select 500 (1994–1996); DieHard 500 (1998–2000); Talladega 500 (2001); Aaron's 499 (2002–2014); GEICO 500 (2015–2024)
- Most wins (driver): Jeff Gordon; Brad Keselowski (4)
- Most wins (team): Hendrick Motorsports (8)
- Most wins (manufacturer): Chevrolet (23)

Circuit information
- Surface: Asphalt
- Length: 2.66 mi (4.28 km)
- Turns: 4

The Jack Link's 500 is a NASCAR Cup Series stock car race held at the Talladega Superspeedway in Lincoln, Alabama.

The race was known as the second leg of the sport's Grand Slam races from 1970 until the result of Ferko lawsuit in 2004. The race was also previously part of the Winston Million. Carson Hocevar is the defending winner of the race, having won it in 2026.

== Notable races ==
- 1971: The first Talladega race under Winston sponsorship. Donnie Allison edged Bobby Allison and Buddy Baker for the win; this was Bobby's first race with Holman-Moody since 1967.
- 1972: David Pearson escaped a crash between Bobby Isaac and Jimmy Crawford coming to the white flag; he grabbed his first Talladega win and second career win in a Wood Brothers Mercury.
- 1973: A massive accident eliminated some 20 cars, leaving David Pearson to ride home almost uncontested. Jim Vandiver made up three laps to finish eighth.
- 1974: Pearson grabbed his third straight Winston 500 (and fourth straight for Wood Brothers Racing), while a crash on pit road led to grave injury to Don Miller of the Penske Racing team. The lead changed 53 times.
- 1975: The race was filled with several accidents, featured the first win for Buddy Baker since 1973 and the first Winston Cup Grand National win for team owner Bud Moore since 1971. Tragedy struck on Lap 149 when race leader Richard Petty pitted with a burning wheel bearing; his brother-in-law Randy Owens was killed when he fitted a hose to a pressurized water tank and the tank exploded. The lead changed 51 times, Five-time F1 Champion Juan Manuel Fangio was the honorary starter.
- 1976: Baker became the first driver to win a 500-mile race in under three hours. He drove Bud Moore's Ford to the win in 2 hours 56 minutes.
- 1977: The race produced 63 official lead changes and a four-car scramble on the final lap. Darrell Waltrip had the lead and on the last lap swung low to break the draft; Cale Yarborough blew past Donnie Allison and swung high on Waltrip; Waltrip sideswiped Cale and Benny Parsons dove low and raced Cale all the way to the stripe.
- 1978: Rain postponed the race to Mother's Day Sunday. Cale Yarborough drafted past Buddy Baker for the win.
- 1980: Baker stormed past sophomore Dale Earnhardt coming to the white flag for his final Talladega win.
- 1981: Bobby Allison fought off a late challenge from Baker, Darrell Waltrip, and Ricky Rudd; the race lead changed six times in the final six laps.
- 1982: Benny Parsons posted the first 200 MPH qualifying lap in NASCAR history. The race lead changed 51 times as Darrell Waltrip and Terry Labonte drafted past Parsons on the final lap. This race was also notable for the only race for a con artist using the name L. W. Wright; who finished poorly in a Music City Racing effort, then after several checks for a NASCAR license and car bounced (and a failure to qualify for the next race at Nashville Fairgrounds Speedway), disappeared.
- 1984: The race has exceeded 40 official lead changes 18 times. In 1984 a motorsports record of 75 lead changes was set, but this record was broken in 2010 as the lead changed 88 times; this record was tied in 2011. The race was won by Cale Yarborough on a last-lap pass of Harry Gant.
- 1985: Bill Elliott came from nearly two laps down and ran down the field under green to take the win from Kyle Petty.
- 1987: On lap 22, Bobby Allison (driving the Stavola Brothers No. 22 Buick) cut a tire and his car went airborne into the catch fencing in front of the main grandstand. Some 100 feet of the fence was sheared off and Allison's car rebounded back to the track. The race was red-flagged, and track crews spent some two hours repairing the safety fence. Despite the wreckage, no drivers or spectators were seriously injured. As a direct result, the next superspeedway race (the 1987 Firecracker 400 at Daytona), saw the cars using smaller carburetors in an effort to curtail speeds. Starting in 1988, all races at Daytona and Talladega saw mandated carburetor restrictor plates, which were used until the introduction of a new aerodynamics package following the 2019 Daytona 500. Overshadowed by the frightening scene was that this race would be the first victory for Bobby Allison's son Davey.
- 1988: Phil Parsons' single Cup series victory which was shadowed by an incident involving A. J. Foyt and Alan Kulwicki that left Foyt suspended from NASCAR for six months. He was also fined $5,000. NASCAR's vice president of competition Les Richter reviewed the incident and lifted the suspension. However, Foyt's fine was increased to $7,500.
- 1990: Dale Earnhardt grabbed his first Talladega win since 1984, holding off a wildcard bid by Greg Sacks.
- 1991: The race was delayed until Monday due to Sunday rains. A massive battle for the lead erupted into a 20-car crash near halfway when pole-sitter Ernie Irvan got into Kyle Petty and Mark Martin; Petty suffered a shattered leg when he was hit in the door by Chad Little. The race was red-flagged for nearly an hour. Harry Gant won the race on a controversial drafting push by teammate Rick Mast who was a lap down.
- 1993: The last lap saw a ferocious scramble where Ernie Irvan stormed past Dale Earnhardt on the final lap. Rusty Wallace roared to third then came down on Earnhardt making contact in the tri-oval sending Wallace flipping violently several times across the finish line similar to his Daytona crash in the same year. The win was Irvan's final win for Morgan–McClure Motorsports.
- 1994: Dale Earnhardt won this race, and dedicated it to Three-time F1 World Champion Ayrton Senna, who died earlier that day in a crash at the 1994 San Marino Grand Prix in Imola, Italy. There were two consecutive Big Ones just past the midway point: the first one happened on lap 103 in a race for third place when Todd Bodine came down on Greg Sacks and spun into Jeff Gordon. The three cars spun, with Sacks escaping, and collected eight other cars. Mark Martin had taken the worst hit, as his car was collected, shot across the infield, struck the inside wall, and plowed through a guardrail, a chain-link fence, and lastly caught by another guardrail protecting the infield road course, coming to a rest feet from a spectator area. After the field bunched up for the restart, another crash occurred in the tri-oval, when Terry Labonte, running 14th, was tapped from behind, starting a chain-reaction crash collecting at least 14 other cars in turn 1.
- 1996: Sterling Marlin rallied from the back of the pack three separate times to take the win. The race saw two airborne crashes; Bill Elliott flew down the backstretch in the air and suffered a leg injury that sidelined him for several races. Later Mark Martin was turned into the wall by Jeff Gordon and bounced into traffic; Ricky Craven tumbled up the Turn One banking and hit the fencing before bouncing down to the ground.
- 1997: Mark Martin won the fastest NASCAR race ever run at Talladega Superspeedway, and the fastest NASCAR race in history when he averaged 188.354 mph in 2 and half hours.
- 2000: Jeff Gordon scored his 50th career win after starting the race from 36th place, the farthest starting spot ever at Talladega. This was also the final start for the once-dominant Bud Moore Engineering (by that point known as Fenley-Moore Motorsports), though they attempted and failed to qualify for the Coca-Cola 600 later that season.
- 2001: Bobby Hamilton won the race after passing Tony Stewart coming to the white flag. It would be Hamilton's final victory before his death in 2007. It was the second caution-free Talladega race ever, and the first restrictor-plate race since Dale Earnhardt's death.
- 2002: Dale Earnhardt Jr. dominated the race, leading for 133 laps, and took home his second consecutive Talladega win, and teammate Michael Waltrip finished second, the third time the DEI Chevrolets had finished 1-2 after the Daytona races of the previous year. The race was marred by a 24 car crash on the back straightaway on lap 164, in the same location where a large crash had occurred the day before in the Busch race that had involved 30 cars. It was the largest crash ever recorded in NASCAR Cup Series competition until the following year. This was also the first Talladega spring Cup race under the "Aaron's 499" name.
- 2003: On lap 4, the largest crash ever recorded in the NASCAR Cup Series happened when Ryan Newman (who had suffered a very violent blow over crash at Daytona that February) blew a tire and hit the turn 1 wall, causing a cloud of smoke that collected 27 cars in all. These included Mike and Rusty Wallace, Steve Park, Mike Skinner, Bobby Labonte, Johnny Benson Jr., eventual race winner Dale Earnhardt Jr., Tony Stewart, Ricky Rudd, Jeff Burton, points leader Matt Kenseth and more. After multiple trips down pit road to repair damage to his car, Earnhardt Jr. made several rallies to the front, overtaking Kenseth with three laps to go to win his fourth consecutive Talladega race.
  - The finish was not without controversy: after the 2001 spring race (thanks in part to protestations from Jimmy Spencer over Mike McLaughlin's blocking in the Busch Series race in 2001), NASCAR ruled that the yellow lines on the bottom of the track at Talladega and Daytona were an out-of-bounds line (with any car that drops below to gain a position to be immediately black-flagged unless they gave the position back or were forced below it). As the cars reached the backstretch, Kenseth made a lane change, going to the outside to block Jimmie Johnson. Earnhardt Jr. was on the inside and was drafting with Elliott Sadler when Kenseth started making a move low to attempt to block Earnhardt; Earnhardt's left wheels went well below the line entering the apron of turn three as he passed Kenseth. NASCAR ruled that Earnhardt was forced below the line as the nose of his car had already passed the nose of Kenseth's car by the time Kenseth made the block, making it a clean pass, this even though Earnhardt was nowhere close to clearing Kenseth when he hit the turn 3 apron – what the rule was ostensibly intended to prevent. Some sanctioning bodies, such as the Indy Racing League, would have called Kenseth out for violating the blocking rule – a driver may not make two-lane changes on a straight, which is a penalty; the ethic against blocking, however, holds no weight in NASCAR given the gendered nature of the cars. The yellow line rule remained a controversial rule in the sport, with subsequent controversies in the 2008 and 2020 autumn races.
  - Following Dale Earnhardt Jr.'s 2003 win, Hendrick Motorsports won four straight – three by Jeff Gordon and one by Jimmie Johnson.
- 2004: Jeff Gordon's win was marked by a spinout by Brian Vickers with 4⅓ laps to go. In the wake of a dangerous incident between Casey Mears and Dale Jarrett the previous September at New Hampshire, the beneficiary rule was adopted, prohibiting racing back to the caution. One ruling of the beneficiary rule was that if a race went past a specified point (Lap 183 in this case; five laps remaining) and had a caution, they would not throw out the red flag and stop the cars to ensure a green-flag finish. Dale Earnhardt Jr. was side by side with Gordon and attempted a pass on Gordon for the lead at the time of caution. Television replays (which override previous scoring loops when less than five laps remain) declared Gordon was still ahead. The race finished under yellow and while Gordon did his victory burnout, enraged fans littered the track with garbage to protest the finish (it was believed that Vickers' crash and the subsequent cleanup would not have taken very long to clean up). This reaction, following a similar fan bombardment of the track at Daytona International Speedway after the 2002 Pepsi 400 ended under yellow, would result in the overtime rule being instituted in the NASCAR Cup Series and Nationwide Series less than two months later.
- 2008: Kyle Busch won at Talladega over Juan Pablo Montoya. Until 2023, this was his most recent win at Talladega in the Cup Series.
- 2009: A final battle to the finish between Brad Keselowski and Carl Edwards ended in near-disaster when Edwards' car made contact with Keselowski while approaching the finish line and was hooked onto the trioval apron. The car spun into the air and was hammered by Ryan Newman, sending Edwards flipping into the catch fence as Keselowski and Dale Earnhardt Jr. crossed the finish line. The debris from the wreck injured eight spectators, all non-life-threatening. Immediately after the car came to rest, Edwards walked away unharmed after jogging past the finish line as an absurd homage to the finale of the 2006 racing comedy Talladega Nights: The Ballad of Ricky Bobby. Keselowski went on to win the race in only his fifth NASCAR Cup Series starts, undoubtedly one of the biggest upsets of the decade. There were two Big Ones during the race: one in turn 3 on lap 7 involving 14 cars, and one on the back straightaway on Lap 180 involving eleven cars. There were 56 lead changes among 25 drivers.
- 2010: The race was called "the Greatest Talladega Race Ever" by Darrell Waltrip. Throughout the race, there was a record 88 lead changes, breaking the previous record of 75 in the 1984 Winston 500, with 87 of those in regulation. A record 29 different drivers held the lead at one point or another during the race, breaking the record set in the 2008 AMP Energy 500. Among the strongest cars throughout the day were Dale Earnhardt Jr., Denny Hamlin, David Reutimann, Jeff Burton (who led the most laps), Kyle Busch, A. J. Allmendinger, and Michael Waltrip. The new overtime rule was implemented for the first time to the maximum of three attempts (the first attempt because Jeff Gordon, Jeff Burton, and Scott Speed wrecked in the tri-oval on lap 182; the second attempt began when Joey Logano turned Ryan Newman loose in turn 3 and Newman ran into the wall, collecting Bobby Labonte, Elliott Sadler, Brian Vickers, Kasey Kahne, Marcos Ambrose, Sam Hornish Jr., and Brad Keselowski; the third attempt happened when Jimmie Johnson was clipped by Greg Biffle and collided with the inside wall on the back straightaway). Jamie McMurray was the leader at each GWC restart and on the final lap, McMurray and Kevin Harvick pulled away. Coming through the tri-oval, Harvick pushed McMurray up the track and moved low; unlike Carl Edwards the previous year, McMurray gave Harvick room, which allowed Harvick to overtake him and win the race by a wheel, with an official margin of victory set at .012 seconds. This marked Harvick's first win since the 2007 Daytona 500 amid contract talks for the 2010 season. Harvick's contract was renewed shortly afterward.
- 2011: The race saw a Hendrick Motorsports sweep of the top four starting positions, with Jeff Gordon winning the inside pole and Jimmie Johnson taking the outside pole. During the race, Gordon and Johnson drafted respectively with Mark Martin and Dale Earnhardt Jr., who filled out the second row on the grid.
  - The race set the record for most lead changes in regulation (tying the all-time record for most lead changes overall, but the 88th lead change took place on lap 188, the last lap of regulation, unlike the previous year, when Harvick's last-lap pass on McMurray took place on Lap 200, the final lap of the third green-white-checkered finish), and also tied the 2003 Carolina Dodge Dealers 400 for the closest NASCAR Cup Series finish in the electronic timing era (1993–present) at 0.002 seconds. Coming into the tri-oval, Gordon was being pushed by Martin and dueling with Clint Bowyer, who was being pushed by Kevin Harvick. Entering the tri-oval, Johnson, pushed by Earnhardt Jr., squeezed low to Gordon's inside. A brush between Earnhardt Jr., and Martin killed Gordon’s momentum, and Johnson was able to edge ahead of Bowyer and Gordon to win.
- 2012: This was the first Talladega race after NASCAR mandated a smaller spoiler and also radiator changes to induce a greater risk of overheating. The changes were made to break up tandem drafting; the lead changed only 34 times and drivers such as Jeff Gordon protested after the race that the rules package made them race "too conservative." The race saw two crashes in the last 60 laps: one on lap 142 involving five cars in turn 3 caused by some cars running out of gas, and another in turn 1 during a late restart on lap 186 (after Kurt Busch's spin in the tri-oval). In the final laps, a tandem draft of Brad Keselowski and Kyle Busch stormed into the lead; Keselowski shook off Busch's bumper and blasted away to win by two car lengths, the first time in several years that the race win had not been decided by the last-lap.
- 2013: A green-white-checkered finish set up a frantic final lap as Front Row Motorsports drivers David Ragan and David Gilliland stormed from midpack to a 1-2 finish, Ragan's second Cup Series win and his first with FRM. Teammate Gilliland finished second, giving FRM a 1-2 finish and its first NASCAR win. Matt Kenseth led 142 of 192 laps, the most laps led at a Talladega race since Jeff Gordon led 139 laps in 2005, but was shuffled back on the final lap. The race was interrupted by a 3-hour-36-minute-long red flag for a rainstorm around lap 126, which pushed the end of the race into basically complete darkness. There were two Big Ones during the race: the first one, in turn one on lap 43 involving 16 cars, instigated by Kyle Busch touching Kasey Kahne from behind, and another one at the end of the back straightaway on lap 182 involving 13 cars which saw Kurt Busch flip over and land on top of Ryan Newman. It was David Ragan's second win in the NASCAR Cup Series (after winning the 2011 Coke Zero 400 at Daytona driving for Roush Fenway Racing). This race is sometimes referred to as "The 7 hours of Talladega", as the field first received the green flag at 1:07 pm EST/12:07 CDT and finished at around 8:15 pm EST/7:15 CDT, causing NASCAR to do just a single attempt at an overtime finish due to darkness. It was also NASCAR's first major test/workout for their new Air Titan track-drying technique, which did double duty, also working the Nationwide race the day before. Nationwide race winner Regan Smith was in contention toward the end but was shuffled back and finished sixth.
- 2014: Denny Hamlin clawed to his first win of the season and the first points-paying restrictor-plate race win. The race ended under yellow when Justin Allgaier, who'd rallied to challenge for the win in the final 30 laps, crashed with Alex Bowman coming to the white flag. Dale Earnhardt Jr. led 26 laps but lost the lead draft in the final 20 laps and finished 26th. Danica Patrick led six laps early but faded to 22nd. The story of the race was Brad Keselowski; after spinning in the first turn following a shunt with Patrick, he lost six laps early in the race with radiator problems; in the second half of the race he was fighting to get a lap back; he spun out with 50 to go and the crash involved some eleven other cars; Jeff Gordon and Matt Kenseth were very critical of Keselowski's actions. A crash with twelve to go eliminated Keselowski's teammate Joey Logano. This was also the final Talladega spring Cup race under the "Aaron's 499" name.
- 2015: The race started at 1:20 p.m., The lead changed 27 times between 15 drivers, A multi-car wreck happened on lap 47, as 15 cars were involved, that brought out an 11-minute 15-second red flag, Dale Earnhardt Jr. won his first race of the season. This was also the first Talladega spring race under the "GEICO 500" name.
- 2016: The race was started 20 minutes early due to the threat of rain in the area. After a 50 lap opening green-flag run, the race itself was marred by eight crashes, including four Big Ones. Of the 40 cars in the field, only seven cars finished without damage. These included a wreck on lap 96 that saw Chris Buescher flip over three times on the back straightaway, a 17 car wreck in turn 1 on lap 162, and a 12 car wreck on lap 180 saw Matt Kenseth flip over on the back straightaway and strike the inside wall, before turning back upright. Brad Keselowski won his second race of the year as an eight-car wreck unfolded in the tri-oval. The lead changed 37 times between 17 drivers.
- 2017: The race was also notable because of the big one striking late and A. J. Allmendinger going over on his roof with Chase Elliott almost going over, and Danica Patrick hitting hard on the backstretch as she did in the spring 2016 race. The race was won by Ricky Stenhouse Jr, which was his first NASCAR Cup Series win.
- 2019: This race was the first at Talladega without restrictor plates since 1987, as NASCAR used a tapered spacer to restrict the engines instead. Chase Elliott won the race after a final lap crash resulted in Kyle Larson going airborne on the backstretch and flipping several times.
- 2020: Ryan Blaney won in a photo finish in the most competitive running (57 official lead changes) since 2011. The race had been delayed to Monday by rain and interrupted 60 laps in by more rain. A more serious metaphorical cloud came over the Speedway when a garage door rope tied into a noose was found in the stall of Bubba Wallace the night previous. Support for Wallace came rapidly from the entire racing community. An FBI investigation was performed, declaring Wallace was not the target of a hate crime. Wallace in the Richard Petty Motorsports 43 led one lap and was running fourth with three to go but had to pit for fuel and finished 14th.
- 2021: Joey Logano got airborne and flipped over in Turn 3 on the last lap of Stage 1. Despite also being involved in the wreck, Brad Keselowski continued on and would end up winning the race. This would be his last win until 2024 at Darlington Raceway.
- 2023: Kyle Busch got his 1st win at Talladega in 15 years when Bubba Wallace and Ryan Blaney triggered The Big One headed into Turn 1 on the final lap.
- 2024: Tyler Reddick stole the win after Michael McDowell pulled a bad block on Brad Keselowski in the trioval coming to the checkered flag and triggered The Big One, with Corey LaJoie finishing the race with his car on its side up on the outside wall and then rolling back onto the wheels.

== Past winners ==
Year	Date	No.	Driver	Team	Manufacturer	Race distance		Race time	Average speed (mph)	Report	Ref
Year	Date	No.	Driver	Team	Manufacturer	Laps	Miles (km)	Race time	Average speed (mph)	Report	Ref
1970	April 12	40	Pete Hamilton	Petty Enterprises	Plymouth	188	500.08 (804.8)	3:16:59	152.321	Report	
1971	May 16	21	Donnie Allison	Wood Brothers Racing	Mercury	188	500.08 (804.8)	3:23:32	147.419	Report	
1972	May 7	21	David Pearson	Wood Brothers Racing	Mercury	188	500.08 (804.8)	3:43:15	134.4	Report	
1973	May 6	21	David Pearson	Wood Brothers Racing	Mercury	188	500.08 (804.8)	3:47:23	131.956	Report	
1974	May 5	21	David Pearson	Wood Brothers Racing	Mercury	170*	452.2 (727.745)	3:28:09	130.22	Report	
1975	May 4	15	Buddy Baker	Bud Moore Engineering	Ford	188	500.08 (804.8)	3:26:59	144.948	Report	
1976	May 2	15	Buddy Baker	Bud Moore Engineering	Ford	188	500.08 (804.8)	2:56:37	169,887	Report	
1977	May 1	88	Darrell Waltrip	DiGard Motorsports	Chevrolet	188	500.08 (804.8)	3:01:59	164.877	Report	
1978	May 14	11	Cale Yarborough	Junior Johnson & Associates	Oldsmobile	188	500.08 (804.8)	3:07:53	155.699	Report	
1979	May 6	15	Bobby Allison	Bud Moore Engineering	Ford	188	500.08 (804.8)	3:13:52	154.77	Report	
1980	May 4	28	Buddy Baker	Ranier-Lundy	Oldsmobile	188	500.08 (804.8)	2:56:00	170.481	Report	
1981	May 3	28	Bobby Allison	Ranier-Lundy	Buick	188	500.08 (804.8)	3:20:52	149.376	Report	
1982	May 2	11	Darrell Waltrip	Junior Johnson & Associates	Buick	188	500.08 (804.8)	3:11:19	156.597	Report	
1983	May 1	43	Richard Petty	Petty Enterprises	Pontiac	188	500.08 (804.8)	3:14:55	153.936	Report	
1984	May 6	28	Cale Yarborough	Ranier-Lundy	Chevrolet	188	500.08 (804.8)	2:53:27	172.988	Report	
1985	May 5	9	Bill Elliott	Melling Racing	Ford	188	500.08 (804.8)	2:41:04	186.288	Report	
1986	May 4	22	Bobby Allison	Stavola Brothers Racing	Buick	188	500.08 (804.8)	3:10:16	157.698	Report	
1987	May 3	28	Davey Allison	Ranier-Lundy Racing	Ford	178*	473.48 (761.992)	3:04:12	154.228	Report	
1988	May 1	55	Phil Parsons	Leo Jackson Racing	Oldsmobile	188	500.08 (804.8)	3:11:40	156.547	Report	
1989	May 7	28	Davey Allison	Robert Yates Racing	Ford	188	500.08 (804.8)	3:12:30	155.869	Report	
1990	May 6	3	Dale Earnhardt	Richard Childress Racing	Chevrolet	188	500.08 (804.8)	3:08:02	159.571	Report	
1991	May 6*	33	Harry Gant	Leo Jackson Racing	Oldsmobile	188	500.08 (804.8)	3:01:10	165.62	Report	
1992	May 3	28	Davey Allison	Robert Yates Racing	Ford	188	500.08 (804.8)	2:59:01	167.609	Report	
1993	May 2	4	Ernie Irvan	Morgan–McClure Motorsports	Chevrolet	188	500.08 (804.8)	3:13:04	155.412	Report	
1994	May 1	3	Dale Earnhardt	Richard Childress Racing	Chevrolet	188	500.08 (804.8)	3:10:32	157.478	Report	
1995	April 30	6	Mark Martin	Roush Racing	Ford	188	500.08 (804.8)	2:47:43	178.902	Report	
1996	April 28	4	Sterling Marlin	Morgan–McClure Motorsports	Chevrolet	188	500.08 (804.8)	3:20:02	149.999	Report	
1997	May 10*	6	Mark Martin	Roush Racing	Ford	188	500.08 (804.8)	2:39:18	188.354	Report	
1998	April 26	18	Bobby Labonte	Joe Gibbs Racing	Pontiac	188	500.08 (804.8)	3:30:40	144.428	Report	
1999	April 25	3	Dale Earnhardt	Richard Childress Racing	Chevrolet	188	500.08 (804.8)	3:03:38	163.395	Report	
2000	April 16	24	Jeff Gordon	Hendrick Motorsports	Chevrolet	188	500.08 (804.8)	3:06:11	161.157	Report	
2001*	April 22	55	Bobby Hamilton	Andy Petree Racing	Chevrolet	188	500.08 (804.8)	2:43:04	184.003	Report	
2002	April 21	8	Dale Earnhardt Jr.	Dale Earnhardt, Inc.	Chevrolet	188	500.08 (804.8)	3:08:41	159.022	Report	
2003	April 6	8	Dale Earnhardt Jr.	Dale Earnhardt, Inc.	Chevrolet	188	500.08 (804.8)	3:27:28	144.625	Report	
2004	April 25	24	Jeff Gordon	Hendrick Motorsports	Chevrolet	188	500.08 (804.8)	3:51:53	129.396	Report	
2005	May 1	24	Jeff Gordon	Hendrick Motorsports	Chevrolet	194*	516.04 (830.485)	3:30:46	146.904	Report	
2006	May 1*	48	Jimmie Johnson	Hendrick Motorsports	Chevrolet	188	500.08 (804.8)	3:29:59	142.891	Report	
2007	April 29	24	Jeff Gordon	Hendrick Motorsports	Chevrolet	192*	510.72 (821.924)	3:18:46	154,167	Report	
2008	April 27	18	Kyle Busch	Joe Gibbs Racing	Toyota	188	500.08 (804.8)	3:10:37	157.409	Report	
2009	April 26	09	Brad Keselowski	Phoenix Racing	Chevrolet	188	500.08 (804.8)	3:23:20	147.565	Report	
2010*	April 25	29	Kevin Harvick	Richard Childress Racing	Chevrolet	200*	532 (856.171)	3:31:58	150.59	Report	
2011*	April 17	48	Jimmie Johnson	Hendrick Motorsports	Chevrolet	188	500.08 (804.8)	3:12:01	156.261	Report	
2012	May 6	2	Brad Keselowski	Penske Racing	Dodge	194*	516.04 (830.485)	3:13:17	160.192	Report	
2013	May 5	34	David Ragan	Front Row Motorsports	Ford	192*	510.72 (821.924)	3:26:02	148.729	Report	
2014	May 4	11	Denny Hamlin	Joe Gibbs Racing	Toyota	188	500.08 (804.8)	3:17:16	152.103	Report	
2015	May 3	88	Dale Earnhardt Jr.	Hendrick Motorsports	Chevrolet	188	500.08 (804.8)	3:08:08	159.487	Report	
2016	May 1	2	Brad Keselowski	Team Penske	Ford	188	500.08 (804.8)	3:34:15	140.046	Report	
2017	May 7	17	Ricky Stenhouse Jr.	Roush Fenway Racing	Ford	191*	508.06 (817.643)	3:29:16	145.669	Report	
2018	April 29	22	Joey Logano	Team Penske	Ford	188	500.08 (804.8)	3:16:46	152.489	Report	
2019	April 28	9	Chase Elliott	Hendrick Motorsports	Chevrolet	188	500.08 (804.8)	3:05:59	161.331	Report	
2020	June 22*	12	Ryan Blaney	Team Penske	Ford	191*	508.06 (817.643)	3:27:28	146.933	Report	
2021	April 25	2	Brad Keselowski	Team Penske	Ford	191*	508.06 (817.643)	3:26:30	147.62	Report	
2022	April 24	1	Ross Chastain	Trackhouse Racing	Chevrolet	188	500.08 (804.8)	3:21:52	148.637	Report	
2023	April 23	8	Kyle Busch	Richard Childress Racing	Chevrolet	196*	521.36 (838.88)	3:33:25	146.575	Report	
2024	April 21	45	Tyler Reddick	23XI Racing	Toyota	188	500.08 (804.8)	3:13:29	155.977	Report	
2025	April 27	2	Austin Cindric	Team Penske	Ford	188	500.08 (804.8)	3:10:52	157.203	Report	
2026	April 26	77	Carson Hocevar	Spire Motorsports	Chevrolet	188	500.08 (804.8)	3:23:25	147.504	Report	
2027	April 25									Report	

- 1974: Race shortened due to the energy crisis.
- 1987: Race shortened due to darkness – caused by a red flag that lasted for two and a half hours to repair the catch fence after Bobby Allison's lap 22 crash.
- 1991 & 2006: Race moved from Sunday to Monday due to rain.
- 1997: Race was scheduled for Sunday, April 27, but was moved back two weeks due to rain.
- 2001: The first restrictor-plate race after Dale Earnhardt's death was the second-ever caution-free race in Talladega history. It was Bobby Hamilton's last win in Cup before his death in 2007 to cancer.
- 2005, 2007, 2010, 2012, 2013, 2017, 2020, 2021, & 2023: Race extended due to a NASCAR Overtime finish.
- 2020: Race postponed from April 26 to June 21 due to the COVID-19 pandemic. Postponed from June 21 to June 22 due to rain.

=== Multiple winners (drivers) ===
Wins	Driver	Years won
4	Jeff Gordon	2000, 2004–2005, 2007
4	Brad Keselowski	2009, 2012, 2016, 2021
3	David Pearson	1972–1974
3	Buddy Baker	1975–1976, 1980
3	Bobby Allison	1979, 1981, 1986
3	Davey Allison	1987, 1989, 1992
3	Dale Earnhardt	1990, 1994, 1999
3	Dale Earnhardt Jr.	2002–2003, 2015
2	Darrell Waltrip	1977, 1982
2	Cale Yarborough	1978, 1984
2	Mark Martin	1995, 1997
2	Jimmie Johnson	2006, 2011
2	Kyle Busch	2008, 2023

=== Multiple winners (teams) ===
Wins	Driver	Years won
8	Hendrick Motorsports	2000, 2004–2007, 2011, 2015, 2019
6	Team Penske	2012, 2016, 2018, 2020–2021, 2025
5	Richard Childress Racing	1990, 1994, 1999, 2010, 2023
4	Wood Brothers Racing	1971–1974
4	Ranier-Lundy	1980–1981, 1984, 1987
3	Bud Moore Engineering	1975–1976, 1979
3	Joe Gibbs Racing	1998, 2008, 2014
3	Roush Fenway Racing	1995, 1997, 2017
2	Petty Enterprises	1970, 1983
2	Junior Johnson & Associates	1978, 1982
2	Leo Jackson Racing	1988, 1991
2	Robert Yates Racing	1989, 1992
2	Morgan-McClure Motorsports	1993, 1996
2	Dale Earnhardt, Inc.	2002–2003

=== Manufacturer wins ===
Wins	Manufacturer	Years won
23	Chevrolet	1977, 1984, 1990, 1993–1994, 1996, 1999, 2000–2007, 2009–2011, 2015, 2019, 2022–2023, 2026
16	Ford	1975–1976, 1979, 1985, 1987, 1989, 1992, 1995, 1997, 2013, 2016–2018, 2020–2021, 2025
4	Mercury	1971–1974
4	Oldsmobile	1978, 1980, 1988, 1991
3	Buick	1981–1982, 1986
3	Toyota	2008, 2014, 2024
2	Pontiac	1983, 1998
1	Dodge	2012

Previous race: Cook Out 400	NASCAR Cup Series; Jack Link's 500	Next race: Würth 400
