= NASCAR Cup Series at New Hampshire Motor Speedway =

NASCAR Cup Series races at New Hampshire Motor Speedway

NASCAR Cup Series
- Venue: New Hampshire Motor Speedway
- Location: Loudon, New Hampshire, United States

Circuit information
- Surface: Asphalt
- Length: 1.058 mi (1.703 km)
- Turns: 4

Stock car races in the NASCAR Cup Series have been held at New Hampshire Motor Speedway in Loudon, New Hampshire since 1993.

A second race in September was also formerly held at the track from 1997 to 2017 until it was moved to Las Vegas Motor Speedway, starting in 2018.

== Current race ==
Dollar Tree 301

NASCAR Cup Series
- Venue: New Hampshire Motor Speedway
- Location: Loudon, New Hampshire, United States
- Corporate sponsor: Dollar Tree
- First race: 1993
- Distance: 318.458 miles (512.508 km)
- Laps: 301; Stage 1: 75; Stage 2: 110; Final stage: 116
- Previous names: Slick 50 300 (1993–1995); Jiffy Lube 300 (1996–1999) thatlook.com 300 (2000); New England 300 (2001–2003, 2005); Siemens 300 (2004); Lenox Industrial Tools 300 (2006–2007); Lenox Industrial Tools 301 (2008–2012); Camping World RV Sales 301 (2013–2014); 5-hour Energy 301 (2015); New Hampshire 301 (2016); Overton's 301 (2017); Foxwoods Resort Casino 301 (2018–2021); Ambetter 301 (2022); Crayon 301 (2023); USA Today 301 (2024); Mobil 1 301 (2025)
- Most wins (driver): Jeff Burton (3)
- Most wins (team): Joe Gibbs Racing (10)
- Most wins (manufacturer): Ford (14)

Circuit information
- Surface: Asphalt
- Length: 1.058 mi (1.703 km)
- Turns: 4

The Dollar Tree 301 is a NASCAR Cup Series stock car race held at New Hampshire Motor Speedway in Loudon, New Hampshire.

Ryan Blaney is the defending race winner, having won it in 2026.

=== History ===
The race has been traditionally run in July, but from 2007 to 2010 it was run in late June or early July as the race preceding the Coke Zero 400 in order to allow that race to run as close to the 4th of July as possible. In 2011, the race returned to its traditional mid-July date and it held that date every year until 2025 (except for 2020 when it was held in early August due to schedule changes related to the COVID-19 pandemic and 2024 when it was held in late June) when the date to was moved to mid-September and the race was made the opening race of the Round of 12 in the NASCAR Cup Series playoffs. From its inaugural running in 1993 through 2007 the race was 300 laps, but after Bruton Smith and his company SMI bought the track, their first date was given the moniker of the extra mile and was increased to 301 laps. In 2008, Kurt Busch won the race after it was called due to rain after 284 laps. One year later, Joey Logano became the youngest winner in NASCAR Cup Series history after the race was also shortened because of rain after 273 laps, at the age of 19 years, 1 month, and 4 days.

During the practice for the July 2000 event, Kenny Irwin Jr. was killed after he lost control of his car, which slammed head on into the wall, causing it to flip onto its side. His cause of death, basilar skull fracture, was the same cause that killed Busch Series driver Adam Petty 2 months prior at Busch 200 at the same track, leading NASCAR to make significant rule changes to maintain driver safety, including an experiment on using a restrictor plate for the second New Hampshire Cup race that season.

==== Race sponsorship ====
Newell Rubbermaid, through its Lenox Industrial Tools subsidiary, was the title sponsor of the first race from 2006 to 2012. Starting in 2008, organizers added an extra lap to represent that Lenox Industrial Tools "is looking for users and suppliers of industrial tools that go the extra mile, whose jobs are physically demanding, day after day, and still find time to contribute to their communities in a meaningful way." The race was dubbed "The Extra Mile at the Magic Mile." Under the Lenox Industrial Tools sponsorship, the race was 318.5 miles (512.6 km) in length while the fall race remained at 317.4 miles (510.8 km). After Lenox Industrial Tools left as title sponsor, Camping World picked up the sponsorship of the event through its RV Sales department for 2013 and 2014, and since the 301 moniker became popular with the fans, NHMS decided to keep their July event 301 laps long.

In 2017, the first race (along with the track's Xfinity Series race the day before) received sponsorship from water sports store Overton's (which is owned by Camping World), branding it the Overton's 301.

Starting in 2018, Foxwoods Resort Casino, located in Ledyard, Connecticut, became the title sponsor of the race after announcing a multi-year sponsorship agreement with the racetrack on May 31, 2018.

In 2022, Ambetter, which was the title sponsor of the Xfinity Series race at New Hampshire in 2021, became the title sponsor of the race, replacing Foxwoods. Before the 2022 Cup Series race at the track, it was announced that Crayon Software Experts, which replaced Ambetter as the title sponsor of the Xfinity Series race at New Hampshire in 2022, would sponsor the track's Cup Series race in 2023. It had been announced the previous week that Ambetter would move their title sponsorship to the spring Cup Series race at Atlanta in 2023. Since then, the race has had various title sponsors, such as USA Today, Mobil 1, and Dollar Tree.

=== Trophy ===
Unlike other races, the trophy (for the July race only between 1997 and 2017) is in the form of an American lobster provided by Makris Lobster and Steak House of Concord, New Hampshire. The restaurant selects the largest lobster in its tank, usually weighing in at 20 lbs or more. After the winning driver poses with the lobster on victory lane, Makris pressure cooks it and sends the meat to the winning pit crew while a taxidermist reassembles the shell and mounts it on a trophy for the driver.

There were some exceptions to this tradition. After winning the race in 2008, Kurt Busch donated his lobster to the New England Aquarium; it died shortly after its arrival.

=== Past winners ===
| Year | Date | No. | Driver | Team | Manufacturer | Race distance | | Race time | Average speed (mph) | Report | Ref |
| Year | Date | No. | Driver | Team | Manufacturer | Laps | Miles (km) | Race time | Average speed (mph) | Report | Ref |
|---|---|---|---|---|---|---|---|---|---|---|---|
| 1993 | July 11 | 2 | Rusty Wallace | Penske Racing | Pontiac | 300 | 317.4 (510.805) | 2:59:45 | 105.947 | Report | |
| 1994 | July 10 | 10 | Ricky Rudd | Rudd Performance Motorsports | Ford | 300 | 317.4 (510.805) | 3:37:24 | 87.599 | Report | |
| 1995 | July 9 | 24 | Jeff Gordon | Hendrick Motorsports | Chevrolet | 300 | 317.4 (510.805) | 2:57:56 | 107.029 | Report | |
| 1996 | July 14 | 28 | Ernie Irvan | Robert Yates Racing | Ford | 300 | 317.4 (510.805) | 3:12:30 | 98.93 | Report | |
| 1997 | July 13 | 99 | Jeff Burton | Roush Racing | Ford | 300 | 317.4 (510.805) | 2:42:35 | 117.134 | Report | |
| 1998 | July 12 | 99 | Jeff Burton | Roush Racing | Ford | 300 | 317.4 (510.805) | 3:04:54 | 102.996 | Report | |
| 1999 | July 11 | 99 | Jeff Burton | Roush Racing | Ford | 300 | 317.4 (510.805) | 3:06:56 | 101.876 | Report | |
| 2000 | July 9 | 20 | Tony Stewart | Joe Gibbs Racing | Pontiac | 273* | 288.834 (464.833) | 2:48:01 | 103.145 | Report | |
| 2001 | July 22 | 88 | Dale Jarrett | Robert Yates Racing | Ford | 300 | 317.4 (510.805) | 3:06:28 | 102.131 | Report | |
| 2002 | July 21 | 22 | Ward Burton | Bill Davis Racing | Dodge | 300 | 317.4 (510.805) | 3:26:14 | 92.342 | Report | |
| 2003 | July 20 | 48 | Jimmie Johnson | Hendrick Motorsports | Chevrolet | 300 | 317.4 (510.805) | 3:16:29 | 96.924 | Report | |
| 2004 | July 25 | 97 | Kurt Busch | Roush Racing | Ford | 300 | 317.4 (510.805) | 3:14:36 | 97.862 | Report | |
| 2005 | July 17 | 20 | Tony Stewart | Joe Gibbs Racing | Chevrolet | 300 | 317.4 (510.805) | 3:05:36 | 102.608 | Report | |
| 2006 | July 16 | 5 | Kyle Busch | Hendrick Motorsports | Chevrolet | 308* | 325.864 (524.427) | 3:12:51 | 101.384 | Report | |
| 2007 | July 1 | 11 | Denny Hamlin | Joe Gibbs Racing | Chevrolet | 300 | 317.4 (510.805) | 2:55:59 | 108.215 | Report | |
| 2008 | June 29 | 2 | Kurt Busch | Penske Racing | Dodge | 284* | 300.472 (483.562) | 2:48:56 | 106.719 | Report | |
| 2009 | June 28 | 20 | Joey Logano | Joe Gibbs Racing | Toyota | 273* | 288.834 (464.833) | 2:57:45 | 97.497 | Report | |
| 2010 | June 27 | 48 | Jimmie Johnson | Hendrick Motorsports | Chevrolet | 301 | 318.458 (512.508) | 2:48:38 | 113.308 | Report | |
| 2011 | July 17 | 39 | Ryan Newman | Stewart–Haas Racing | Chevrolet | 301 | 318.458 (512.508) | 3:03:33 | 104.1 | Report | |
| 2012 | July 15 | 5 | Kasey Kahne | Hendrick Motorsports | Chevrolet | 301 | 318.458 (512.508) | 2:44:24 | 116.226 | Report | |
| 2013 | July 14 | 55 | Brian Vickers | Michael Waltrip Racing | Toyota | 302* | 319.516 (514.211) | 3:14:10 | 98.735 | Report | |
| 2014 | July 13 | 2 | Brad Keselowski | Team Penske | Ford | 305* | 322.69 (519.319) | 2:58:03 | 108.741 | Report | |
| 2015 | July 19 | 18 | Kyle Busch | Joe Gibbs Racing | Toyota | 301 | 318.458 (512.508) | 2:56:06 | 108.504 | Report | |
| 2016 | July 17 | 20 | Matt Kenseth | Joe Gibbs Racing | Toyota | 301 | 318.458 (512.508) | 2:57:53 | 107.416 | Report | |
| 2017 | July 16 | 11 | Denny Hamlin | Joe Gibbs Racing | Toyota | 301 | 318.458 (512.508) | 3:00:36 | 105.8 | Report | |
| 2018 | July 22 | 4 | Kevin Harvick | Stewart–Haas Racing | Ford | 301 | 318.458 (512.508) | 2:52:56 | 110.49 | Report | |
| 2019 | July 21 | 4 | Kevin Harvick | Stewart–Haas Racing | Ford | 301 | 318.458 (512.508) | 3:03:37 | 104.062 | Report | |
| 2020 | August 2* | 2 | Brad Keselowski | Team Penske | Ford | 301 | 318.458 (512.508) | 3:10:22 | 100.372 | Report | |
| 2021 | July 18 | 10 | Aric Almirola | Stewart–Haas Racing | Ford | 293* | 309.994 (498.887) | 3:07:52 | 99.004 | Report | |
| 2022 | July 17 | 20 | Christopher Bell | Joe Gibbs Racing | Toyota | 301 | 318.458 (512.508) | 3:14:45 | 98.113 | Report | |
| 2023 | July 17* | 19 | Martin Truex Jr. | Joe Gibbs Racing | Toyota | 301 | 318.458 (512.508) | 3:08:07 | 101.572 | Report | |
| 2024 | June 23 | 20 | Christopher Bell | Joe Gibbs Racing | Toyota | 305* | 322.69 (519.415) | 3:48:14 | 84.832 | Report | |
| 2025 | September 21 | 12 | Ryan Blaney | Team Penske | Ford | 301 | 318.458 (512.508) | 3:07:53 | 101.699 | Report | |
| 2026 | August 23 | 12 | Ryan Blaney | Team Penske | Ford | 301 | 318.458 (512.508) | 3:22:59 | 94.133 | Report | |
| 2027 | September 26 | | | | | | | | | Report | |

==== Notes ====
- 2000, 2008, and 2009: Race shortened due to rain.
- 2006, 2013, 2014, and 2024: Race extended due to a NASCAR overtime finish.
- 2020: Race postponed from July 19 to August 2 due to schedule changes resulting from the COVID-19 pandemic.
- 2021: Race delayed due to rain and shortened by eight laps due to darkness.
- 2023: Race postponed from Sunday to Monday due to rain.

==== Multiple winners (drivers) ====
| Wins | Driver | Years won |
|---|---|---|
| 3 | Jeff Burton | 1997–1999 |
| 2 | Tony Stewart | 2000, 2005 |
| 2 | Kurt Busch | 2004, 2008 |
| 2 | Jimmie Johnson | 2003, 2010 |
| 2 | Kyle Busch | 2006, 2015 |
| 2 | Denny Hamlin | 2007, 2017 |
| 2 | Kevin Harvick | 2018, 2019 |
| 2 | Brad Keselowski | 2014, 2020 |
| 2 | Christopher Bell | 2022, 2024 |
| 2 | Ryan Blaney | 2025, 2026 |

==== Multiple winners (teams) ====
| Wins | Team | Years won |
|---|---|---|
| 10 | Joe Gibbs Racing | 2000, 2005, 2007, 2009, 2015–2017, 2022-2024 |
| 6 | Team Penske | 1993, 2008, 2014, 2020, 2025, 2026 |
| 5 | Hendrick Motorsports | 1995, 2003, 2006, 2010, 2012 |
| 4 | Roush Racing | 1997–1999, 2004 |
| 4 | Stewart–Haas Racing | 2011, 2018, 2019, 2021 |
| 2 | Robert Yates Racing | 1996, 2001 |

==== Manufacturer wins ====
| Wins | Manufacturer | Years won |
|---|---|---|
| 14 | Ford | 1994, 1996–1999, 2001, 2004, 2014, 2018–2021, 2025, 2026 |
| 9 | Chevrolet | 1995, 2003, 2005–2007, 2010–2012 |
| 8 | Toyota | 2009, 2013, 2015–2017, 2022-2024 |
| 2 | Pontiac | 1993, 2000 |
| 2 | Dodge | 2002, 2008 |

== Former race ==
ISM Connect 300
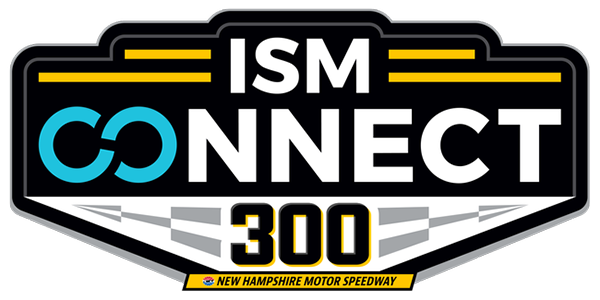

NASCAR Cup Series
- Venue: New Hampshire Motor Speedway
- Location: Loudon, New Hampshire, United States
- First race: 1997
- Last race: 2017
- Distance: 317.4 miles (510.8 km)
- Laps: 300
- Previous names: CMT 300 (1997); Farm Aid on CMT 300 (1998); Dura Lube/Kmart 300 (1999); Dura Lube 300 sponsored by Kmart (2000); New Hampshire 300 (2001–2002); Sylvania 300 (2003–2015); Bad Boy Off Road 300 (2016); ISM Connect 300 (2017)
- Most wins (driver): Jeff Gordon; Ryan Newman (2)
- Most wins (team): Hendrick Motorsports; Richard Childress Racing; Joe Gibbs Racing (4)
- Most wins (manufacturer): Chevrolet (11)

Circuit information
- Surface: Asphalt
- Length: 1.058 mi (1.703 km)
- Turns: 4

The second race at the track, last known as ISM Connect 300, was a NASCAR Cup Series stock car race held at New Hampshire Motor Speedway in Loudon, New Hampshire. Kyle Busch was the final race winner.

=== History ===
From 1997 to 2017 (except in 2001, as it was rescheduled as the season finale due to September 11 attacks on the week of the race's original schedule), a second race was held at the track every September, which came at the expense of the fall race at North Wilkesboro Speedway; Jeff Gordon won the inaugural race. From 2004 to 2010, it was the playoff opener race before being moved to Chicagoland Speedway. Starting in 2018, the fall race would be moved to Las Vegas Motor Speedway.

In 2000, Jeff Burton won the race after leading every lap of the race in a race where restrictor plates were installed following deaths of Kenny Irwin Jr. and Adam Petty; this experiment was reverted (for Cup cars only) the following year. In 2003, several drivers nearly collided with an immobilized Dale Jarrett who attempted to race back to the caution. NASCAR decided to ban the practice effective from the next race at Dover; instead, NASCAR would freeze the field order immediately at the caution, and allow the first lapped car to gain back a lap. This is officially called the "free pass" by NASCAR, but is widely known by fans and journalists as the "lucky dog" rule.

=== Past winners ===
| Year | Date | No. | Driver | Team | Manufacturer | Race distance | | Race time | Average speed (mph) | Report | Ref |
| Year | Date | No. | Driver | Team | Manufacturer | Laps | Miles (km) | Race time | Average speed (mph) | Report | Ref |
|---|---|---|---|---|---|---|---|---|---|---|---|
| 1997 | September 14 | 24 | Jeff Gordon | Hendrick Motorsports | Chevrolet | 300 | 317.4 (510.805) | 3:09:45 | 100.364 | Report | |
| 1998 | August 30 | 24 | Jeff Gordon | Hendrick Motorsports | Chevrolet | 300 | 317.4 (510.805) | 2:49:55 | 112.078 | Report | |
| 1999 | September 19 | 42 | Joe Nemechek | SABCO Racing | Chevrolet | 300 | 317.4 (510.805) | 3:09:10 | 100.673 | Report | |
| 2000 | September 17 | 99 | Jeff Burton | Roush Racing | Ford | 300 | 317.4 (510.805) | 3:06:42 | 102.003 | Report | |
| 2001 | November 23* | 31 | Robby Gordon | Richard Childress Racing | Chevrolet | 300 | 317.4 (510.805) | 3:03:50 | 103.594 | Report | |
| 2002 | September 15 | 12 | Ryan Newman | Penske Racing | Ford | 207* | 219.006 (352.455) | 2:05:03 | 105.081 | Report | |
| 2003 | September 14 | 48 | Jimmie Johnson | Hendrick Motorsports | Chevrolet | 300 | 317.4 (510.805) | 2:58:41 | 106.58 | Report | |
| 2004 | September 19 | 97 | Kurt Busch | Roush Racing | Ford | 300 | 317.4 (510.805) | 2:53:31 | 109.753 | Report | |
| 2005 | September 18 | 12 | Ryan Newman | Penske Racing | Dodge | 300 | 317.4 (510.805) | 3:18:36 | 95.891 | Report | |
| 2006 | September 17 | 29 | Kevin Harvick | Richard Childress Racing | Chevrolet | 300 | 317.4 (510.805) | 3:06:21 | 102.195 | Report | |
| 2007 | September 16 | 07 | Clint Bowyer | Richard Childress Racing | Chevrolet | 300 | 317.4 (510.805) | 2:52:23 | 110.475 | Report | |
| 2008 | September 14 | 16 | Greg Biffle | Roush Fenway Racing | Ford | 300 | 317.4 (510.805) | 3:00:34 | 105.468 | Report | |
| 2009 | September 20 | 5 | Mark Martin | Hendrick Motorsports | Chevrolet | 300 | 317.4 (510.805) | 3:09:01 | 100.753 | Report | |
| 2010 | September 19 | 33 | Clint Bowyer* | Richard Childress Racing | Chevrolet | 300 | 317.4 (510.805) | 2:58:22 | 106.769 | Report | |
| 2011 | September 25 | 14 | Tony Stewart | Stewart–Haas Racing | Chevrolet | 300 | 317.4 (510.805) | 2:43:13 | 116.679 | Report | |
| 2012 | September 23 | 11 | Denny Hamlin | Joe Gibbs Racing | Toyota | 300 | 317.4 (510.805) | 2:43:02 | 116.81 | Report | |
| 2013 | September 22 | 20 | Matt Kenseth | Joe Gibbs Racing | Toyota | 300 | 317.4 (510.805) | 2:57:02 | 107.573 | Report | |
| 2014 | September 21 | 22 | Joey Logano | Team Penske | Ford | 303* | 320.574 (515.913) | 3:14:53 | 98.697 | Report | |
| 2015 | September 27 | 20 | Matt Kenseth | Joe Gibbs Racing | Toyota | 300 | 317.4 (510.805) | 2:58:51 | 106.480 | Report | |
| 2016 | September 25 | 4 | Kevin Harvick | Stewart–Haas Racing | Chevrolet | 300 | 317.4 (510.805) | 2:54:15 | 109.291 | Report | |
| 2017 | September 24 | 18 | Kyle Busch | Joe Gibbs Racing | Toyota | 300 | 317.4 (510.805) | 2:54:47 | 108.958 | Report | |

- 2001: Race postponed from September 16 to November 23 due to 9/11.
- 2002: Race shortened due to rain.
- 2010: Clint Bowyer's car was found to have illegal modifications in post-race inspection, and he was penalized 150 points, while crew chief Shane Wilson was suspended four races.
- 2014: Race extended due to a NASCAR Overtime finish.

==== Multiple winners (drivers) ====
| # Wins | Driver | Years won |
|---|---|---|
| 2 | Jeff Gordon | 1997–1998 |
| 2 | Ryan Newman | 2002, 2005 |
| 2 | Clint Bowyer | 2007, 2010 |
| 2 | Matt Kenseth | 2013, 2015 |
| 2 | Kevin Harvick | 2006, 2016 |

==== Multiple winners (teams) ====
| # Wins | Team | Years won |
|---|---|---|
| 4 | Hendrick Motorsports | 1997–1998, 2003, 2009 |
| 4 | Richard Childress Racing | 2001, 2006–2007, 2010 |
| 4 | Joe Gibbs Racing | 2012–2013, 2015, 2017 |
| 3 | Roush Fenway Racing | 2000, 2004, 2008 |
| 3 | Team Penske | 2002, 2005, 2014 |
| 2 | Stewart–Haas Racing | 2011, 2016 |

==== Manufacturer wins ====
| # Wins | Manufacturer | Years won |
|---|---|---|
| 11 | Chevrolet | 1997–1999, 2001, 2003, 2006–2007, 2009–2011, 2016 |
| 5 | Ford | 2000, 2002, 2004, 2008, 2014 |
| 4 | Toyota | 2012–2013, 2015, 2017 |
| 1 | Dodge | 2005 |

| Previous race: Busch Light at The Glen | NASCAR Cup Series; Dollar Tree 301 | Next race: Hollywood Casino 400 |
