= 2001 Indianapolis 500 =

American motor race

85th Indianapolis 500
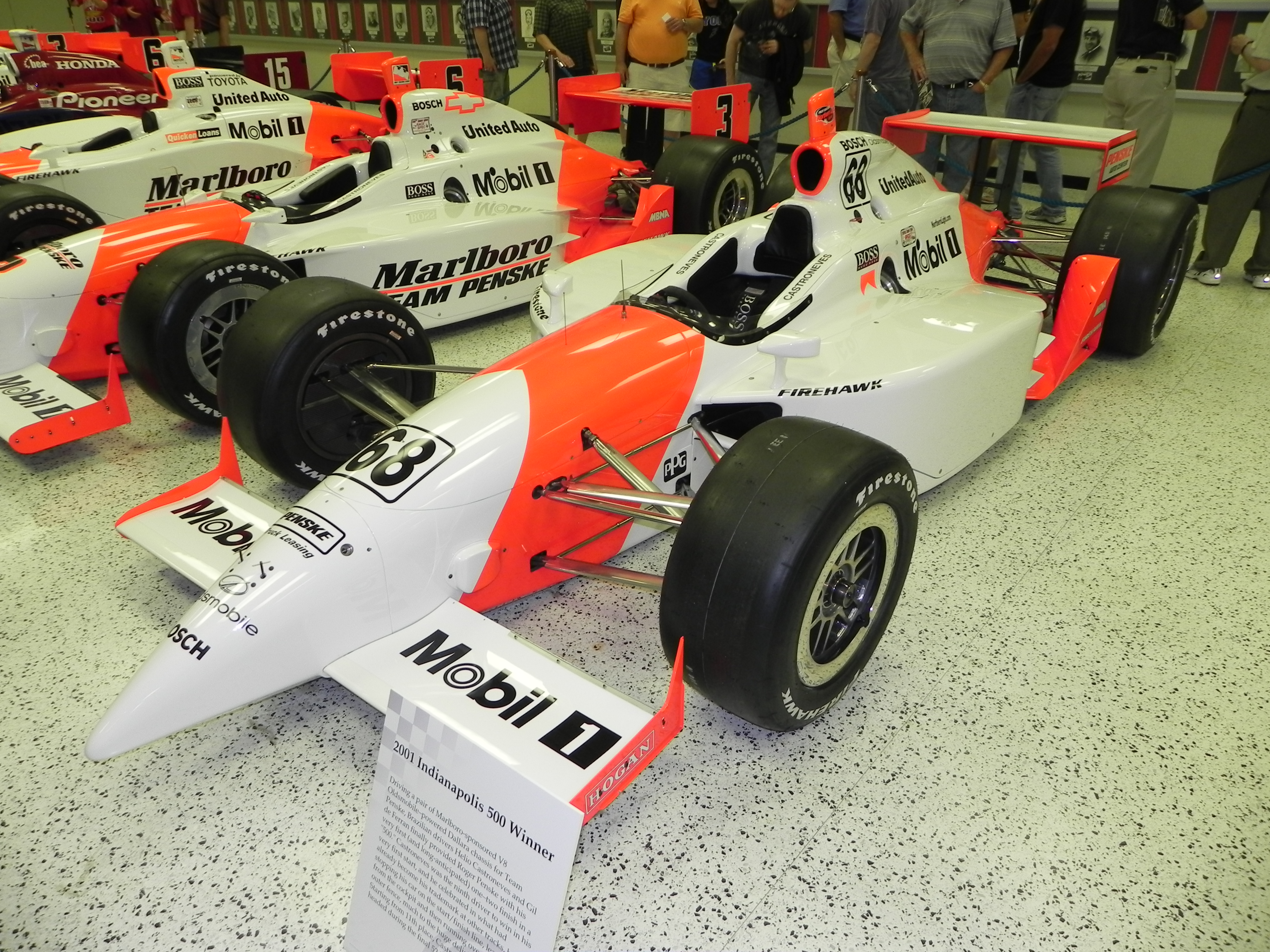

Indianapolis Motor Speedway

Indianapolis 500
- Sanctioning body: Indy Racing League
- Season: 2001 IRL season
- Date: May 27, 2001
- Winner: (Brazil) Hélio Castroneves
- Winning team: Penske Racing
- Winning Chief Mechanic: Rick Rinaman
- Time of race: 3:31:54.180
- Average speed: 141.574 mph (228 km/h)
- Pole position: (United States) Scott Sharp
- Pole speed: 226.037 mph (364 km/h)
- Fastest qualifier: (United States) Scott Sharp
- Rookie of the Year: (Brazil) Hélio Castroneves
- Most laps led: (Brazil) Hélio Castroneves (52)

Pre-race ceremonies
- National anthem: Steven Tyler
- "Back Home Again in Indiana": Jim Nabors
- Starting command: Mari Hulman George
- Pace car: Oldsmobile Bravada
- Pace car driver: Elaine Irwin Mellencamp
- Starter: Bryan Howard
- Estimated attendance: 400,000

Television in the United States
- Network: ABC
- Announcers: Bob Jenkins, Larry Rice, Jason Priestley
- Nielsen ratings: 5.8 / 17

Chronology
Previous	Next
2000	2002

The 85th Indianapolis 500 was held at the Indianapolis Motor Speedway in Speedway, Indiana on Sunday, May 27, 2001. Race rookie Hélio Castroneves, a three-year veteran of the CART series, led the final 52 laps and won his first of four Indy 500 victories. Team Penske swept first and second with Gil de Ferran finishing as the runner-up. Winning car owner Roger Penske scored his record-extending eleventh victory at the Indianapolis 500, and notched his first-ever 1–2 finish in the race. It was a redemption from the team's previous attempt at Indy (1995) in which both of his cars failed to qualify. Team Penske did not compete at Indianapolis from 1996 to 2000 due to the ongoing open wheel "Split".

The race was sanctioned by the Indy Racing League, and was part of the 2001 Indy Racing Northern Lights Series season. The 2001 race was notable in that several top CART teams returned to Indy for the first time since 1995. IRL-based teams excelled in time trials, taking the front row, and the top four starting positions overall. However, the CART-based teams swept the top six finishing positions on race day. Former IRL champion Tony Stewart (who was competing full-time in NASCAR), returned to Indy after missing the 2000 race. Stewart raced "Double Duty", becoming the first driver in history to complete all 1,100 miles. He finished 6th at Indy, and 3rd at the Coca-Cola 600.

The race experienced two rain delays, one lengthy yellow flag around the midway point, and one brief red flag period later in the day. The race, however, was run to its full 500-mile distance.

This race marked the final IndyCar start for the previous year's championship runner-up, and two-time Indy 500 runner-up Scott Goodyear. Goodyear suffered an injury in a crash, and retired from racing. He would move to color commentary duties for ESPN the following season.

== Race background ==
In the seventh year of the ongoing IRL/CART split, Team Penske and Team Green purchased IRL-type machines, and returned to race at Indianapolis. Ganassi, who had returned (and won) in 2000, entered as well. For the first time during the open wheel split, the CART series did not schedule any races for the weekend of the Indy 500, nor for the weekend of pole qualifying, allowing their teams the opportunity to participate at Indianapolis without interference.

Because of his move to Formula One for the 2001 season, reigning Indianapolis 500 champion Juan Pablo Montoya did not return to defend his title. Montoya would not race in the Indy 500 again until 2014. After one year of retirement, two-time Indy 500 winner Arie Luyendyk returned to the cockpit.

After an experimental two-week schedule was used for the Indy 500 from 1998 to 2000, the Speedway reverted to a more traditional three-week schedule for practice, time trials, and the race. Rookie orientation was held April 13–14. Time trials were set at three days, however, instead of the original four. The week-long open test held in April from 1998 to 2000 was also eliminated, essentially replaced by the reinstatement of the second week of May practice.

Due to the MSA, tobacco brand sponsorship became an issue during the month of May. Team Penske drivers Hélio Castroneves and Gil de Ferran were sponsored by Marlboro full-time in the CART series. The MSA, however, allowed brand sponsorship in only one sport per season. To skirt the regulations, CART sanctioned the participation of its teams in the race. The Penske cars practiced and qualified with Marlboro logos during the first week of activity. By mid-month, however, they were required to remove the logos when the state attorney general's office objected to their use. Rather than repaint the liveries, or add generic logos (such as the familiar Marlboro "barcode" insignia), the sidepods were simply left blank; the familiar white/red Marlboro paint scheme was maintained.

=== Rule changes ===
During yellow flag caution periods, the "wave around" rule would now be employed. When the field is one lap away from going back to green flag conditions, all lapped cars behind the pace car that happen to be ahead of the actual race leader would be waved around the pace car, get their lap back, and be permitted to catch up to the tail end of the line of cars. This would continue until the race leader became the first car behind the pace car. Following the precedent set in 2000, the pace car would then drop off the track in turn one, and the race leader would pace the field back to the green flag and the ensuring restart.

The new restart rules were an attempt to ensure the leaders would get back to green flag racing without interference from lapped cars. It also created a strategy for lapped cars to earn one lap back (ostensibly by not pitting under a caution flag while all of the leader do), since Indy car racing had never allowed "racing back to the caution", nor did they want to implement a hard rule like the "Lucky Dog" in NASCAR.

== Race schedule ==
Race schedule — April 2001
Sun	Mon	Tue	Wed	Thu	Fri	Sat
8	9	10	11	12	13; ROP	14; ROP
Race schedule — May 2001
		1	2	3	4	5 Mini-Marathon
6 Practice	7 Practice	8 Practice	9 Practice	10; Practice	11; Practice	12; Pole Day
13; Time Trials	14	15	16; Practice	17; Practice	18; Practice	19; Practice
20; Bump Day	21	22	23	24; Carb Day	25	26; Parade
27; Indy 500	28; Memorial Day	29	30	31		

Color	Notes
Green	Practice
Dark Blue	Time trials
Silver	Race day
Red	Rained out*
Blank	No track activity

* Includes days where track activity
was significantly limited due to rain

ROP — denotes Rookie Orientation Program

== Practice and Time Trials ==
IRL regular Greg Ray led the practice speeds for four of the first six days. Casey Mears, Eliseo Salazar, and Stan Wattles suffered crashes during the week. On Fast Friday, Indy 500 rookie Hélio Castroneves brushed the wall in turn one, but continued. The car suffered minor damage. Later that evening, Castroneves joked around with track workers, and helped them repaint the retaining wall which he had hit.

=== Pole Day - Saturday May 12 ===
During the morning practice session, Tony Stewart turned the fastest practice lap of the month at 226.996 mph. However, the session was later halted when Eliseo Salazar blew an engine and crashed in turn one.

IRL regular Scott Sharp won the pole position with a four-lap average of 226.037 mph. Greg Ray, who had been among the fastest cars all week, waved off during his first attempt qualified, then returned later in the day to qualify second. Robby Gordon, driving an Indy-only entry for A.J. Foyt Racing, rounded out the front row. The highest of the CART regulars was Gil de Ferran, who qualified 5th. Former Indy 500 winners Arie Luyendyk, Buddy Lazier, Al Unser Jr., and Eddie Cheever also made the field. At the end of the day, the field was filled to 27 cars.

=== Second Day - Sunday May 13 ===
On the second day of qualifying, veterans Michael Andretti, Eddie Cheever, and Buzz Calkins withdrew their slow times from Saturday and re-qualified with better speeds. Rookie Bruno Junqueira was the fastest of the afternoon. At the end of the first weekend of qualifying, the field was filled to 32 cars in the field.

=== Bump Day - Sunday May 20 ===
On Bump Day, Billy Boat was the first car to complete a qualifying attempt, and the field was subsequently filled to 33 cars. Six cars were bumped during the afternoon, and Boat dropped to the bubble spot as of 5:07 p.m. Over the final 53 minutes Boat survived twelve attempts to be bumped from the field. Eight cars waved off, and four were too slow. With ten seconds left before the 6 o'clock gun, Memo Gidley was the final driver to make a qualifying attempt. He failed to bump his way into the field by only 0.242 seconds.

== Carb Day ==
The final practice was scheduled for Thursday May 24. All 33 cars plus the first alternate took laps. No serious incidents were reported. Jeret Schroeder required a tow-in due to his car being stuck in gear. Hélio Castroneves's car was seen on pit lane with its engine cover removed, but the crew reported they were simply draining excess motor oil. Scott Sharp (223.678 mph) was the fastest of the day.

=== Pit Stop Challenge ===
The 25th annual Coors Pit Stop Challenge was held Thursday May 24. Twelve teams competed in a single-elimination bracket. Seven teams earned berths based on pit stop performance at Indy Racing League events since the previous year's Indianapolis 500. Three spots would be filled by the three highest race qualifiers not already in the contest. The last two spots would be filled by a last-chance qualifying session on May 9.

On Wednesday May 9, the last chance competition trials were held. The results were as follows: Michael Andretti (10.38 seconds), Hélio Castroneves (12.44 seconds), Buddy Lazier (19.22 seconds), Jeff Ward (no time), Didier André (no time), Gil de Ferran (no time). Pole position winner Scott Sharp, outside front row starter Robby Gordon, and Gil de Ferran each earned spots based on race qualifying results. Gordon, however, withdrew from the contest and he was replaced by Buddy Lazier.

The bracket was determined by a blind draw. Four teams received byes for the first round. During the semifinal match between Gil de Ferran and race polesitter Scott Sharp, de Ferran stalled his engine and never left the pit box. The finals pitted Kelley Racing versus Galles Racing, with the crew of Scott Sharp defeating Al Unser Jr. It was the first and only win in the event for Kelley Racing. After three previous wins in the pit stop contest, it marked Al Unser Jr.'s first defeat in the championship round.

First Round
28	Mark Dismore (Kelley Racing)	10.14
39	Michael Andretti (Andretti Green)	10.66
68	Hélio Castroneves (Team Penske)	9.61
4	Sam Hornish Jr. (Panther Racing)	10.42
8	Scott Sharp (Kelley Racing)	10.32
91	Buddy Lazier (Hemelgarn Racing)	11.91
66	Gil de Ferran (Team Penske)	11.10
5	Arie Luyendyk (Treadway Racing)	11.63

Quarterfinals
3	Al Unser Jr. (Galles Racing)	10.13
28	Mark Dismore (Kelley Racing)	10.24
68	Hélio Castroneves (Team Penske)	9.46
12	Buzz Calkins (Bradley Motorsports)	27.18
8	Scott Sharp (Kelley Racing)	9.53
14	Eliseo Salazar (Foyt Racing)	10.65
66	Gil de Ferran (Team Penske)	9.88
2	Greg Ray (Team Menard)	11.00

Semifinals
3	Al Unser Jr. (Galles Racing)	9.47
68	Hélio Castroneves (Team Penske)	9.74
8	Scott Sharp (Kelley Racing)	9.31
66	Gil de Ferran (Team Penske)	no time

Finals
8	Scott Sharp (Kelley Racing)	9.20
3	Al Unser Jr. (Galles Racing)	12.67

== Starting grid ==
Row	Inside	Middle	Outside
1	(United States) 8 - Scott Sharp	(United States) 2 - Greg Ray	(United States) 41 - Robby Gordon
2	(United States) 28 - Mark Dismore	(Brazil) 66 - Gil de Ferran	(Netherlands) 5 - Arie Luyendyk W
3	(United States) 33 - Tony Stewart	(United States) 35 - Jeff Ward	(United States) 24 - Robbie Buhl
4	(United States) 91 - Buddy Lazier W	(Brazil) 68 - Hélio Castroneves R	(United States) 44 - Jimmy Vasser
5	(United States) 4 - Sam Hornish Jr.	(United States) 10 - Robby McGehee	(United States) 15 - Sarah Fisher
6	(Canada) 52 - Scott Goodyear	(United States) 77 - Jaques Lazier	(United States) 6 - Jon Herb R
7	(United States) 3 - Al Unser Jr. W	(Brazil) 50 - Bruno Junqueira R	(United States) 39 - Michael Andretti
8	(France) 49 - Nicolas Minassian R	(United States) 9 - Jeret Schroeder	(United States) 12 - Buzz Calkins
9	(United States) 51 - Eddie Cheever W	(United States) 99 - Davey Hamilton	(United States) 84 - Donnie Beechler
10	(Chile) 14 - Eliseo Salazar	(France) 36 - Stéphan Grégoire	(Brazil) 88 - Airton Daré
11	(United States) 16 - Cory Witherill R	(United States) 98 - Billy Boat	(Brazil) 21 - Felipe Giaffone R

=== Alternates ===
- First alternate: (Japan) Shigeaki Hattori (#55) – Bumped
- Second alternate: (United States) Memo Gidley R (#37) – Too slow

=== Failed to qualify ===
- #21 (Brazil) Raul Boesel – Replaced by Felipe Giaffone
- #07 (Colombia) Roberto Guerrero – Bumped
- #32 (France) Didier André R – Bumped
- #60 (United States) Tyce Carlson – Bumped; replaced by Richie Hearn
- #30 (United States) Jimmy Kite – Wave off
- #31 (United States) Casey Mears – Wave off
- #94 (United States) Stan Wattles – Crash
- #30 (United States) Brandon Erwin R - Replaced by Jimmy Kite

== Race recap ==
=== Start ===
Race morning was overcast with rain in the forecast. Cool temperatures caused problems at the start, as pole sitter Scott Sharp crashed in the first turn on the first lap. Greg Ray and Robby Gordon barely avoided the crash, and slipped by the lead the field around for the first several laps.

On the 6th lap, the green came out, but less than 2 laps later, another crash occurred. Sarah Fisher spun in turn two, and collected Scott Goodyear. Both cars were heavily damaged, and Goodyear suffered a broken back. Goodyear would retire from IndyCar racing after the race due to the injury.

After a lengthy yellow, the green came out on lap 17. During the restart, however, cold tires caused yet another crash, as Sam Hornish Jr. spun in turn four. Hornish did not hit anything, but Al Unser Jr. moved high to avoid the crash, and brushed along the outside wall on the main stretch, ending his race.

=== First half and first rain delay ===
The race finally got going on lap 22, with Robby Gordon and Greg Ray dominating the early going. A long stretch of green flag racing saw the leaders cycle through two green flag pit stops. On lap 107, Jon Herb crashed in turn 1. During the yellow, rain began to fall around the track, and the caution was extended until lap 119. Michael Andretti led when the rain fell, but pitted soon after. Gil de Ferran inherited the lead, Team Penske teammate Hélio Castroneves second.

=== Second half and second rain delay ===
On lap 134, Cory Witherill spun exiting turn four. The leaders all headed to the pits. Castroneves and de Ferran were both penalized for exiting out of the pits incorrectly, giving Tony Stewart the lead for the first time of the day. Stewart led until rain fell again on lap 149. After Stewart pitted, Hélio Castroneves retook the lead. Rain began falling harder on lap 155, and the red flag was displayed. After about 10 minutes, the sun came out, and the track quickly dried. After a 17-minute red flag, the cars were refired.

=== Finish ===
Hélio Castroneves led Robbie Buhl on the restart. Buhl attempted to take the lead on lap 159, but was blocked. Trailing by less than a half-second on lap 166, Buhl suddenly spun exiting turn 2, and tapped the inside wall.

The green came back out on lap 171, with Castroneves still leading, and de Ferran back to second. Castroneves held off his teammate by 0.4838 seconds, and won his first Indy 500. The finish marked Roger Penske's 11th Indy 500 triumph, and his first 1-2 finish. It was the second rookie winner in a row (following Juan Pablo Montoya in 2000).

On the victory lap, Castroneves stopped at the finish line, climbed from his car, and proceeded to engage in his customary celebration of climbing the catch fence, much to the delight of the fans. Several crew members from Team Penske joined him on the fence.

In a public relations setback for the IRL, the top six finishers were all visiting drivers from either the rival CART series or the NASCAR Cup series. The first regular IRL series driver to finish was Eliseo Salazar in seventh place, running a lap down.

Scott Sharp's crash on the first lap meant for the second year in a row, the pole sitter finished 33rd and last. In the previous year's race, the same fate had befallen Greg Ray.

The 1-2 result for Team Penske provided a stunning comeback for the most successful team in Indianapolis 500 history after their failure to qualify for the 1995 race, the last Indy 500 entered by Team Penske due to the Indy 500 becoming an IRL race from 1996 onward. "I think we redeemed ourselves for the lousy thing we did in 1995 ... this is the best day of my life coming back like this" said Roger Penske in pit lane immediately after Castroneves took the checkered flag.

== Tony Stewart does Double Duty ==
Tony Stewart attempted the Indy/Charlotte "Double Duty" for the second time in his racing career. Criticized by members of the media as being overweight and unfit for the grueling task, Stewart undertook a month-long fitness and dietary program with a personal trainer. Stewart, still driving the #20 The Home Depot-sponsored Pontiac for Joe Gibbs Racing in the NASCAR Winston Cup Series, signed with Chip Ganassi Racing, part of a four driver effort at Indy.

Stewart qualified in 7th at Indy and 12th at Charlotte. Due to the new television package on Fox, the start of the Coca-Cola 600 was moved up. A strict schedule was put into place, and regardless if the race was not over at Indy, Stewart was allegedly required to get out of the car at 4:00 p.m. to fly to Charlotte on time. During a 17-minute red flag, he had to visit first aid for a cramping leg. Relief driver Richie Hearn almost took over, but Stewart got back in the car.

The race was eventually resumed, and Stewart continued. The race was completed, and he finished 6th, on the lead lap. Immediately he flew to Lowe's Motor Speedway, and made the start of the race on time. He was moved to the back of the pack during the pace lap for missing the drivers' meeting. On the second lap, Stewart spun while running last, in an incident he claimed was unrelated to fatigue. As the race wore on, he steadily climbed the standings, and finished 3rd on the lead lap. He became the first and still only driver ever to complete all 1,100 miles (1,800 km). Feeling that he proved his critics wrong, Stewart called them "idiots".

== Box score ==
Finish	Start	No	Name	Qual	Chassis	Engine	Laps	Status	Entrant
1	11	68	(Brazil) Hélio Castroneves R	224.142	Dallara	Oldsmobile	200	141.574 mph	Team Penske
2	5	66	(Brazil) Gil de Ferran	224.406	Dallara	Oldsmobile	200	+1.7373	Team Penske
3	21	39	(United States) Michael Andretti	223.441	Dallara	Oldsmobile	200	+5.7691	Team Green
4	12	44	(United States) Jimmy Vasser	223.455	G-Force	Oldsmobile	200	+13.9541	Chip Ganassi Racing
5	20	50	(Brazil) Bruno Junqueira R	224.209	G-Force	Oldsmobile	200	+27.2885	Chip Ganassi Racing
6	7	33	(United States) Tony Stewart	224.248	G-Force	Oldsmobile	200	+37.5787	Chip Ganassi Racing
7	28	14	(Chile) Eliseo Salazar	223.740	Dallara	Oldsmobile	199	-1 Lap	A. J. Foyt Enterprises
8	30	88	(Brazil) Airton Daré	222.236	G-Force	Oldsmobile	199	-1 Lap	TeamXtreme
9	32	98	(United States) Billy Boat	221.528	Dallara	Oldsmobile	199	-1 Lap	CURB/Agajanian/Beck Motorsports
10	33	21	(Brazil) Felipe Giaffone R	221.879	G-Force	Oldsmobile	199	-1 Lap	Treadway Racing
11	14	10	(United States) Robby McGehee	222.607	Dallara	Oldsmobile	199	-1 Lap	Cahill Racing
12	24	12	(United States) Buzz Calkins	222.467	Dallara	Oldsmobile	198	-2 Laps	Bradley Motorsports
13	6	5	(Netherlands) Arie Luyendyk W	224.257	G-Force	Oldsmobile	198	-2 Laps	Treadway Racing
14	13	4	(United States) Sam Hornish Jr.	223.333	Dallara	Oldsmobile	196	-4 Laps	Panther Racing
15	9	24	(United States) Robbie Buhl	224.213	G-Force	Infiniti	196	-4 Laps	Dreyer & Reinbold Racing
16	4	28	(United States) Mark Dismore	224.964	Dallara	Oldsmobile	195	-5 Laps	Kelley Racing
17	2	2	(United States) Greg Ray	225.194	Dallara	Oldsmobile	192	-8 Laps	Team Menard
18	10	91	(United States) Buddy Lazier W	224.190	Dallara	Oldsmobile	192	-8 Laps	Hemelgarn Racing
19	31	16	(United States) Cory Witherill R	221.621	G-Force	Oldsmobile	187	-13 Laps	Indy Regency Racing
20	23	9	(United States) Jeret Schroeder	222.785	Dallara	Oldsmobile	187	-13 Laps	PDM Racing
21	3	41	(United States) Robby Gordon	224.994	Dallara	Oldsmobile	184	-16 Laps	A. J. Foyt Enterprises
22	17	77	(United States) Jaques Lazier	222.145	G-Force	Oldsmobile	183	-17 Laps	Jonathan Byrd/TeamXtreme
23	26	99	(United States) Davey Hamilton	221.696	Dallara	Oldsmobile	182	Engine	Sam Schmidt Motorsports
24	8	35	(United States) Jeff Ward	224.222	G-Force	Oldsmobile	168	Running	Heritage Motorsports
25	27	84	(United States) Donnie Beechler	224.449	Dallara	Oldsmobile	160	Running	A. J. Foyt Enterprises
26	25	51	(United States) Eddie Cheever W	222.152	Dallara	Infiniti	108	Electrical	Team Cheever
27	18	6	(United States) Jon Herb R	222.015	Dallara	Oldsmobile	104	Accident	Tri-Star Racing
28	29	36	(France) Stéphan Grégoire	222.888	G-Force	Oldsmobile	86	Oil Leak	Heritage Motorsports
29	22	49	(France) Nicolas Minassian R	223.006	G-Force	Oldsmobile	74	Gearbox	Chip Ganassi Racing
30	19	3	(United States) Al Unser Jr. W	221.615	G-Force	Oldsmobile	16	Accident	Galles Racing
31	15	15	(United States) Sarah Fisher	222.548	Dallara	Oldsmobile	7	Accident	Walker Racing
32	16	52	(Canada) Scott Goodyear	222.529	Dallara	Infiniti	7	Accident	Team Cheever
33	1	8	(United States) Scott Sharp	226.037	Dallara	Oldsmobile	0	Accident	Kelley Racing

W Former Indianapolis 500 winner

R Indianapolis 500 Rookie

All entrants utilized Firestone tires.

=== Race statistics ===
Lap Leaders
Laps	Leader
1–22	Robby Gordon
23–45	Greg Ray
46	Tony Stewart
47	Arie Luyendyk
48–52	Michael Andretti
53–74	Mark Dismore
75–80	Greg Ray
81–84	Michael Andretti
85–91	Mark Dismore
92–102	Greg Ray
103–109	Michael Andretti
110–136	Gil de Ferran
137–148	Tony Stewart
149–200	Hélio Castroneves

Total laps led
Driver	Laps
Hélio Castroneves	52
Greg Ray	40
Mark Dismore	29
Gil de Ferran	27
Robby Gordon	22
Michael Andretti	16
Tony Stewart	13
Arie Luyendyk	1

Cautions: 8 for 56 laps
Laps	Reason
1–5	Scott Sharp crash in turn 1
8–16	Fisher, Goodyear crash in turn 2
18–21	Hornish spin; Unser crash in turn 4
90–95	Oil
107–118	Herb crash in turn 1, then extended by rain
134–138	Cory Witherill spin in turn 4
148–157	Oil; rain (red flag)
166–170	Robbie Buhl crash in turn 2

== National anthem controversy ==
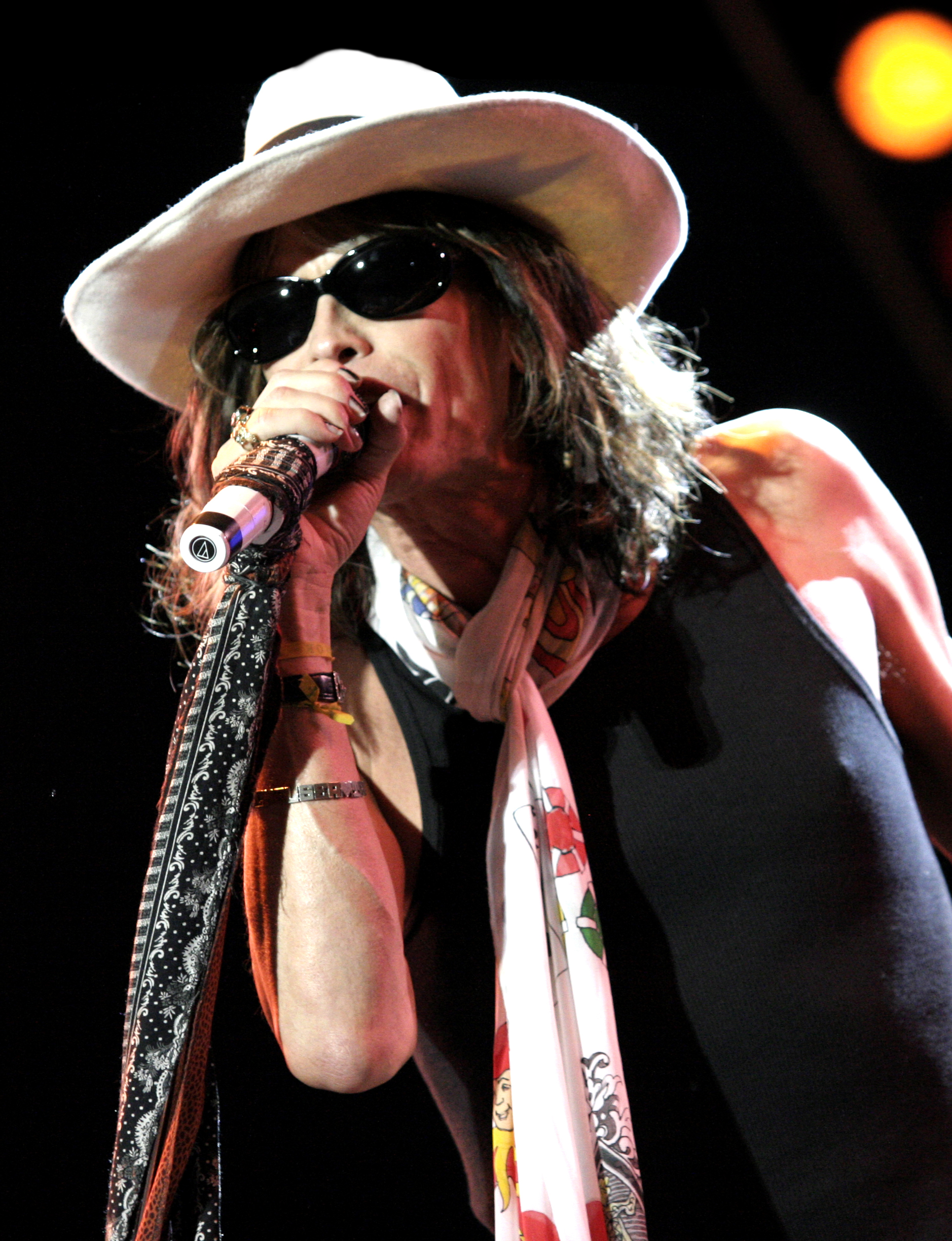
Steven Tyler

For the pre-race ceremonies, the Speedway invited Steven Tyler of Aerosmith to perform "The Star-Spangled Banner". At the time, Aerosmith was kicking off their Just Push Play Tour, and earlier in the year had performed in the halftime show of Super Bowl XXXV. In the days leading up to the race, the band struck a deal with Heritage Motorsports to sponsor Jeff Ward's car during the race. The performance was widely regarded by observers as one of the worst and most controversial renditions of the U.S. national anthem ever.

The national anthem performer at the Indianapolis 500 is normally backed-up by the Purdue All-American Marching Band; however, the band was only allowed to play the opening chorus. Tyler began the song with a harmonica solo, then tossed the instrument into the crowd. He finished the song a cappella. Tyler took artistic license to the extreme, and altered the last line of the song from "...the home of the brave" to "...the home of the Indianapolis 500." The crowd, television and radio commentators, along with military Medal of Honor recipients in attendance due to the Memorial Day holiday, had a largely negative response to the performance. Tyler apologized and stated he meant no disrespect. Said Tyler, "I'm very proud to be an American, and live in the home of the brave."

Speedway president Tony George released a statement the following Tuesday citing "While we are certainly sorry that some were offended, it was neither our intention nor that of Mr. Tyler to be disrespectful. All of us have the utmost respect for the sacrifice our veterans have made for us."

The harmonica Tyler threw into the crowd was reported to be retrieved by Purdue band member David Hornthal. On the February 20, 2012 episode of Pawn Stars, a harmonica purported to be the one Tyler threw into the crowd was presented, but did not sell.

== Broadcasting ==
=== Radio ===
The race was carried live on the Indy Racing Radio Network. Mike King served as chief announcer. Johnny Rutherford served as "driver expert" along with newcomer Johnny Parsons.

Several minor changes were made to the crew. Bob Lamey, Ken Double, and Larry Rice all departed. Kevin Lee joined the crew, taking the turn two position, which was now atop the Southeast Vista grandstand (it was previously on the roof of the VIP Suites). Chris Denari moved from the pits to turn four, where he remains as of today with the exception of 2014 when he was in Miami calling an Indiana Pacers playoff game. Howdy Bell took the limited assignment of hospital reporter and interviews during the pre-race coverage. The job of on-air "statistician" was eliminated permanently. Newcomers Adam Alexander and Kim Morris served as pit reporters along with Mike Lewis, who had debuted just one year earlier.

Starting in 2001, the flagship station for the network was changed back to its original home, 1070 WIBC-AM (now WFNI). Booth interviews were kept to a minimum in 2001. King interviewed Dr. Robert Hubbard, the 2001 co-recipient of the Louis Schwitzer Award for development of the HANS device.

Indy Racing Radio Network
Booth Announcers	Turn Reporters	Pit/garage reporters
Chief Announcer: Mike King; Driver expert: Johnny Rutherford; Driver expert: Johnny Parsons; Historian: Donald Davidson; Commentary: Chris Economaki	Turn 1: Jerry Baker; Turn 2: Kevin Lee; Turn 3: Mark Jaynes; Turn 4: Chris Denari	Adam Alexander (north pits); Mike Lewis (center pits); Kim Morris (south pits)
Chief Announcer: Mike King; Driver expert: Johnny Rutherford; Driver expert: Johnny Parsons; Historian: Donald Davidson; Commentary: Chris Economaki	Turn 1: Jerry Baker; Turn 2: Kevin Lee; Turn 3: Mark Jaynes; Turn 4: Chris Denari	Chuck Marlowe (garages); Howdy Bell (hospital)

=== Television ===
The race was carried live flag-to-flag coverage in the United States on ABC Sports. Al Michaels returned as host, with Bob Jenkins as announcer. Analyst Arie Luyendyk left television and returned to the cockpit. Tom Sneva left television as well. The new booth crew for 2001 included analysts Larry Rice and Jason Priestley.

Gary Gerould was not part of the 2001 broadcast. Instead he was taking part in the CART telecasts for the season. Vince Welch took his place as pit reporter, Welch's first time on television at Indy.

ABC Television
Booth Announcers	Pit/garage reporters	Pre-race analysts
Host: Al Michaels; Announcer: Bob Jenkins; Color: Larry Rice; Color: Jason Priestley	Jack Arute; Vince Welch; Dr. Jerry Punch; Leslie Gudel	Arie Luyendyk; Jason Priestley

== Notes ==
=== Works cited ===
- 2001 Indianapolis 500 Daily Trackside Report for the Media
- Indianapolis 500 History: Race & All-Time Stats - Official Site

2000 Indianapolis 500; Juan Pablo Montoya	2001 Indianapolis 500; Hélio Castroneves	2002 Indianapolis 500; Hélio Castroneves
