= 2010 Sunoco Red Cross Pennsylvania 500 =

Race details
- Race 21 of 36 in the 2010 NASCAR Sprint Cup Series
- The 2010 Sunoco Red Cross Pennsylvania 500 program cover.
- Date: August 1, 2010
- Official name: Sunoco Red Cross Pennsylvania 500
- Location: Pocono Raceway Long Pond, Pennsylvania
- Course: Permanent racing facility
- Course length: 2.500 miles (4.023 km)
- Distance: 200 laps, 500 mi (804.67 km)
- Weather: Temperatures reaching up to 77.0 °F (25.0 °C); average wind speeds of 7.0 miles per hour (11.3 km/h)

Pole position
Driver	Tony Stewart	Stewart–Haas Racing
- Time: 52.511

Most laps led
Driver	Jimmie Johnson	Hendrick Motorsports
- Laps: 96

Winner
No. 16	Greg Biffle	Roush Fenway Racing

Television in the United States
- Network: ESPN
- Announcers: Marty Reid, Dale Jarrett and Andy Petree

The 2010 Sunoco Red Cross Pennsylvania 500 was a NASCAR Sprint Cup Series race held on August 1, 2010 at Pocono Raceway in Long Pond, Pennsylvania. Contested over 200 laps, it was the twenty-first race of the 2010 NASCAR Sprint Cup Series season. Greg Biffle, driving for Roush Fenway Racing, won the race while Tony Stewart finished second, and Carl Edwards, who started twenty-fifth, clinched third. Biffle dedicated the win to Jack Roush, his team owner, who was in the hospital recovering from injuries suffered in an airplane crash. This race gained popularity due to Elliott Sadler's unseen, yet terrifying crash.

== Race report ==
The layout of Pocono Raceway, the venue where the race was held.

=== Background ===
Prior to the race, Kevin Harvick led the Drivers' Championship with 2,920 points, and Hendrick Motorsports driver Jeff Gordon was second with 2,736 points. Behind them in the Drivers' Championship, Denny Hamlin was third with 2,660 points, and Jimmie Johnson was fourth with 2,659 points. Kurt Busch was fifth with 2,658 points. In the Manufacturers' Championship, Chevrolet was leading with 143 points, twenty points ahead of their rival Toyota. In the battle for third place, Ford had 90 points, six ahead of Dodge.

No.	Driver	Team	Make
00	David Reutimann	Michael Waltrip Racing	Toyota
1	Jamie McMurray	Earnhardt Ganassi Racing	Chevrolet
2	Kurt Busch	Penske Racing	Dodge
5	Mark Martin	Hendrick Motorsports	Chevrolet
6	David Ragan	Roush Fenway Racing	Ford
7	P. J. Jones	Robby Gordon Motorsports	Toyota
9	Kasey Kahne	Richard Petty Motorsports	Ford
09	Landon Cassill	Phoenix Racing	Chevrolet
11	Denny Hamlin	Joe Gibbs Racing	Toyota
12	Brad Keselowski	Penske Racing	Dodge
13	Max Papis	Germain Racing	Toyota
14	Tony Stewart	Stewart–Haas Racing	Chevrolet
16	Greg Biffle	Roush Fenway Racing	Ford
17	Matt Kenseth	Roush Fenway Racing	Ford
18	Kyle Busch	Joe Gibbs Racing	Toyota
19	Elliott Sadler	Richard Petty Motorsports	Ford
20	Joey Logano	Joe Gibbs Racing	Toyota
24	Jeff Gordon	Hendrick Motorsports	Chevrolet
26	David Stremme	Latitude 43 Motorsports	Ford
29	Kevin Harvick	Richard Childress Racing	Chevrolet
31	Jeff Burton	Richard Childress Racing	Chevrolet
33	Clint Bowyer	Richard Childress Racing	Chevrolet
34	Kevin Conway	Front Row Motorsports	Ford
36	Casey Mears	Tommy Baldwin Racing	Chevrolet
37	David Gilliland	Front Row Motorsports	Ford
38	Travis Kvapil	Front Row Motorsports	Ford
39	Ryan Newman	Stewart–Haas Racing	Chevrolet
42	Juan Pablo Montoya	Earnhardt Ganassi Racing	Chevrolet
43	A. J. Allmendinger	Richard Petty Motorsports	Ford
46	J. J. Yeley	Whitney Motorsports	Dodge
47	Marcos Ambrose	JTG Daugherty Racing	Toyota
48	Jimmie Johnson	Hendrick Motorsports	Chevrolet
55	Michael McDowell	Prism Motorsports	Toyota
56	Martin Truex Jr.	Michael Waltrip Racing	Toyota
64	Todd Bodine	Gunselman Motorsports	Toyota
66	Dave Blaney	Prism Motorsports	Toyota
71	Bobby Labonte	TRG Motorsports	Chevrolet
77	Sam Hornish Jr.	Penske Racing	Dodge
78	Regan Smith	Furniture Row Racing	Chevrolet
82	Scott Speed	Red Bull Racing Team	Toyota
83	Reed Sorenson	Red Bull Racing Team	Toyota
87	Joe Nemechek	NEMCO Motorsports	Toyota
88	Dale Earnhardt Jr.	Hendrick Motorsports	Chevrolet
98	Paul Menard	Richard Petty Motorsports	Ford
99	Carl Edwards	Roush Fenway Racing	Ford

=== Practice and qualifying ===
Three practice sessions were held before the Sunday race, one on Friday and two on Saturday. The first practice session will last 90 minutes, while the Saturday morning will last 50 minutes. The third and final practice session will last 60 minutes. During the first practice session, Jimmie Johnson was quickest, ahead of Denny Hamlin and Ryan Newman in second and third. Kyle Busch followed in the fourth position, while Tony Stewart was scored fifth. During the first Saturday practice session, Jeff Gordon was scored first fastest, ahead of his teammate Johnson and Kevin Harvick in second and third. Jeff Burton followed in the fourth position, ahead of Greg Biffle in fifth. In the third and final practice session, Burton was quickest with a speed of 166.936 miles per hour (268.657 km/h). Joey Logano and Johnson followed in the second and third positions. Reed Sorenson scored fourth, ahead of Dale Earnhardt Jr. in fifth.

During qualifying, forty-five drivers were entered, but only the fastest forty-three raced because of NASCAR's qualifying procedure. Stewart clinched the pole position, with a time of 52.511. He will be joined on the front row of the grid by Juan Pablo Montoya. Hamlin only managed to qualify third, and Gordon qualified fourth. Newman qualified fifth with a time of 52.961. Johnson, A. J. Allmendinger, Burton, Jamie McMurray and Mark Martin rounded off the top ten. The two drivers that did not qualify were David Stremme and Max Papis.

=== Race summary ===
The start of the race was delayed by rain to 1:54 PM.

At the drop of the green flag, Tony Stewart got a good start, and led for three laps before Jeff Gordon overtook him on the Long Pond straightaway. Over the first fifteen laps, there was a significant amount of shuffling further back in the field as Gordon led. On lap 15, a preplanned competition caution was thrown. Gordon continued to lead at the green flag on lap 19, but was passed a lap later by Greg Biffle. Biffle led for two laps before being overtaken by Jimmie Johnson. Biffle was shuffled back to fourth as Gordon and Jeff Burton passed him. By lap 28, Johnson was leading by 1.5 seconds over Gordon.

On lap 34, Dale Earnhardt Jr. got loose in turn 2 but saved his car, and the green flag stayed out. From lap 45 to lap 50, the field cycled through green flag pit stops. When the cycle was completed, Johnson was still leading, and put David Gilliland one lap down. Elliott Sadler was also penalized for speeding with a pass-through penalty. A second cycle of green flag pit stops began on lap 75. Jimmie Johnson was still leading until he pitted on lap 78, giving Jeff Gordon the lead. Gordon led for one lap, as did Carl Edwards, during this cycle of stops. Their leads were brief, as Johnson reclaimed the lead at the conclusion of the cycle. He continued to lead until Gordon overtook him on lap 120.

One lap later, the second caution was thrown for debris. Earnhardt Jr. received the free pass under this caution, having just been put a lap down by Johnson. A two tire stop during caution flag pit stops allowed Greg Biffle to assume the lead. Rain could be seen approaching the track. Biffle led the field to the green flag on lap 126. He led for two laps. On lap 128, Jeff Gordon overtook Biffle in turn 2, then on the Short Chute was overtaken by Denny Hamlin. Hamlin continued to lead until lap 145, when debris in turn one brought out the third caution. Regan Smith received the free pass. Juan Pablo Montoya stayed out and assumed the lead when the field restarted on lap 150. Over the next three laps, the lead would change several times between Gordon and Montoya, until Gordon obtained a solid lead on lap 153. On lap 155, a NASCAR official reported that it was sprinkling in turn 3.

On lap 158, the fourth caution was waved after Dale Earnhardt Jr. spun in turn 1. Sam Hornish Jr. received the free pass, and Gordon continued to lead when the race restarted on lap 162.

Three laps after the restart, the fifth caution was waved because of a large crash in the Long Pond straightaway, which holds the record for hardest recorded impact in NASCAR history. It started when Kurt Busch spun after contact from Jimmie Johnson, got together with Clint Bowyer and then Busch spun into the wall. Elliott Sadler was spun by A. J. Allmendinger, and took a very extreme ride: his car went face-first into the inside wall (effectively the same as hitting the side of a building) at 160 miles per hour, at a nearly perpendicular angle. The entire front part of the car was torn apart. The engine was ripped from the car and parts from it scattered all across the track. The estimated G-forces were the highest seen in any car accident, and Sadler's car went from racing speed of 160 mph to about 20 mph in a braking distance of three feet. Amazingly, Sadler got out of the car and walked away under his own power, though he needed to lie down to get his breath again afterwards before taking the mandatory ambulance ride to the infield care center. Debris from both crashes required a 30-minute red flag for cleanup.

Memorable about the crash was the lack of camera angles for Sadler's crash: the crash occurred in a blind spot on the track. Although almost every camera had a good view of Kurt Busch's car, only one camera actually saw Sadler's impact, and even then, it was on the side of the screen and partially out of frame. Due to rain that started to fall during the red flag, NASCAR decided to run the field under yellow for several laps to allow the track to dry. Most of the field pitted on lap 170, and Sam Hornish Jr. received the lead. Seven laps later, the field was still running under yellow and the race was re-red flagged for 18 minutes.

Hornish led the cars to the green flag on lap 179, and was overtaken a lap later by Greg Biffle. Biffle got a strong lead, and led the last twenty laps to win the race and snap a 64 race winless streak.

== Results ==
=== Qualifying ===
Grid	No.	Driver	Team	Manufacturer	Speed	Time
1	14	Tony Stewart	Stewart–Haas Racing	Chevrolet	171.393	52.511
2	42	Juan Pablo Montoya	Earnhardt Ganassi Racing	Chevrolet	171.096	52.602
3	11	Denny Hamlin	Joe Gibbs Racing	Toyota	170.371	52.826
4	24	Jeff Gordon	Hendrick Motorsports	Chevrolet	170.222	52.872
5	39	Ryan Newman	Stewart–Haas Racing	Chevrolet	169.936	52.961
6	16	Greg Biffle	Roush Fenway Racing	Ford	169.901	52.972
7	43	A. J. Allmendinger	Richard Petty Motorsports	Ford	169.879	52.979
8	31	Jeff Burton	Richard Childress Racing	Chevrolet	169.770	53.013
9	1	Jamie McMurray	Earnhardt Ganassi Racing	Chevrolet	169.696	53.036
10	5	Mark Martin	Hendrick Motorsports	Chevrolet	169.613	53.062
11	12	Brad Keselowski	Penske Racing	Dodge	169.543	53.084
12	16	Greg Biffle	Roush Fenway Racing	Ford	169.447	53.114
13	2	Kurt Busch	Penske Racing	Dodge	169.440	53.116
14	29	Kevin Harvick	Richard Childress Racing	Chevrolet	169.163	53.203
15	77	Sam Hornish Jr.	Penske Racing	Dodge	169.122	53.216
16	9	Kasey Kahne	Richard Petty Motorsports	Ford	169.100	53.223
17	20	Joey Logano	Joe Gibbs Racing	Toyota	169.024	53.247
18	6	David Ragan	Roush Fenway Racing	Ford	168.995	53.256
19	47	Marcos Ambrose	JTG Daugherty Racing	Toyota	168.700	53.349
20	88	Dale Earnhardt Jr.	Hendrick Motorsports	Chevrolet	168.672	53.358
21	18	Kyle Busch	Joe Gibbs Racing	Toyota	168.669	53.359
22	71	Bobby Labonte	TRG Motorsports	Chevrolet	168.602	53.380
23	98	Paul Menard	Richard Petty Motorsports	Ford	168.413	53.440
24	00	David Reutimann	Michael Waltrip Racing	Toyota	168.366	53.455
25	99	Carl Edwards	Roush Fenway Racing	Ford	168.347	53.461
26	17	Matt Kenseth	Roush Fenway Racing	Ford	168.294	53.478
27	82	Scott Speed	Red Bull Racing Team	Toyota	168.083	53.545
28	56	Martin Truex Jr.	Michael Waltrip Racing	Toyota	167.951	53.587
29	19	Elliott Sadler	Richard Petty Motorsports	Ford	167.813	53.631
30	46	J. J. Yeley	Whitney Motorsports	Dodge	167.629	53.690
31	83	Reed Sorenson	Red Bull Racing Team	Toyota	167.370	53.773
32	38	Travis Kvapil	Front Row Motorsports	Ford	167.330	53.786
33	87	Joe Nemechek	NEMCO Motorsports	Toyota	167.156	53.842
34	78	Regan Smith	Furniture Row Racing	Chevrolet	166.988	53.896
35	09	Landon Cassill	Phoenix Racing	Chevrolet	166.988	53.896
36	55	Michael McDowell	Prism Motorsports	Toyota	166.979	53.899
37	37	David Gilliland	Front Row Motorsports	Ford	166.457	54.068
38	66	Dave Blaney	Prism Motorsports	Toyota	166.392	54.089
39	36	Casey Mears	Tommy Baldwin Racing	Chevrolet	166.322	54.112
40	64	Todd Bodine	Gunselman Motorsports	Toyota	166.276	54.127
41	33	Clint Bowyer	Richard Childress Racing	Chevrolet	165.511	54.377
42	7	P. J. Jones	Robby Gordon Motorsports	Toyota	0	0
43	34	Kevin Conway	Front Row Motorsports	Ford	164.165	54.823
Did not qualify
	26	David Stremme	Latitude 43 Motorsports	Ford	165.386	54.418
	13	Max Papis	Germain Racing	Toyota	165.026	54.537

=== Race results ===
Pos	No.	Driver	Team	Manufacturer	Laps	Led	Points
1	16	Greg Biffle	Roush Fenway Racing	Ford	200	28	190
2	14	Tony Stewart	Stewart–Haas Racing	Chevrolet	200	2	175
3	99	Carl Edwards	Roush Fenway Racing	Ford	200	1	170
4	29	Kevin Harvick	Richard Childress Racing	Chevrolet	200	0	160
5	11	Denny Hamlin	Joe Gibbs Racing	Toyota	200	19	160
6	24	Jeff Gordon	Hendrick Motorsports	Chevrolet	200	39	155
7	5	Mark Martin	Hendrick Motorsports	Chevrolet	200	0	146
8	31	Jeff Burton	Richard Childress Racing	Chevrolet	200	0	142
9	56	Martin Truex Jr.	Michael Waltrip Racing	Toyota	200	0	138
10	48	Jimmie Johnson	Hendrick Motorsports	Chevrolet	200	96	144
11	77	Sam Hornish Jr.	Penske Racing	Dodge	200	9	135
12	39	Ryan Newman	Stewart–Haas Racing	Chevrolet	200	0	127
13	98	Paul Menard	Richard Petty Motorsports	Ford	200	0	124
14	6	David Ragan	Roush Fenway Racing	Ford	200	0	121
15	33	Clint Bowyer	Richard Childress Racing	Chevrolet	200	0	118
16	42	Juan Pablo Montoya	Earnhardt Ganassi Racing	Chevrolet	200	5	120
17	00	David Reutimann	Michael Waltrip Racing	Toyota	200	0	112
18	17	Matt Kenseth	Roush Fenway Racing	Ford	200	0	109
19	9	Kasey Kahne	Richard Petty Motorsports	Ford	200	0	106
20	12	Brad Keselowski	Penske Racing	Dodge	200	0	103
21	78	Regan Smith	Furniture Row Racing	Chevrolet	200	0	100
22	1	Jamie McMurray	Earnhardt Ganassi Racing	Chevrolet	200	0	97
23	18	Kyle Busch	Joe Gibbs Racing	Toyota	200	0	94
24	43	A. J. Allmendinger	Richard Petty Motorsports	Ford	200	0	91
25	20	Joey Logano	Joe Gibbs Racing	Toyota	200	0	88
26	82	Scott Speed	Red Bull Racing Team	Toyota	200	0	85
27	88	Dale Earnhardt Jr.	Hendrick Motorsports	Chevrolet	199	0	82
28	71	Bobby Labonte	TRG Motorsports	Chevrolet	199	0	79
29	38	Travis Kvapil	Front Row Motorsports	Ford	199	0	76
30	37	David Gilliland	Front Row Motorsports	Ford	198	0	73
31	34	Kevin Conway	Front Row Motorsports	Ford	198	0	70
32	83	Reed Sorenson	Red Bull Racing Team	Toyota	171	0	67
33	2	Kurt Busch	Penske Racing	Dodge	164	0	64
34	19	Elliott Sadler	Richard Petty Motorsports	Ford	163	0	61
35	7	P. J. Jones	Robby Gordon Motorsports	Toyota	63	0	58
36	36	Casey Mears	Tommy Baldwin Racing	Chevrolet	62	0	55
37	64	Todd Bodine	Gunselman Motorsports	Toyota	49	0	52
38	46	J. J. Yeley	Whitney Motorsports	Dodge	48	1	54
39	47	Marcos Ambrose	JTG Daugherty Racing	Toyota	46	0	46
40	87	Joe Nemechek	NEMCO Motorsports	Toyota	42	0	43
41	09	Landon Cassill	Phoenix Racing	Chevrolet	32	0	40
42	66	Dave Blaney	Prism Motorsports	Toyota	24	0	37
43	55	Michael McDowell	Prism Motorsports	Toyota	23	0	34

Previous race: 2010 Brickyard 400	Sprint Cup Series; 2010 season	Next race: 2010 Heluva Good! Sour Cream Dips at the Glen
