= Green–white–checkered finish =

Overtime finish in North American motorsports

Green

White

Checkered

The three flags

In North American auto racing, a green–white–checker finish (GWC) is a racing restart procedure in which the race is restarted from a caution period with 2 laps remaining. When the race distance is extended to accommodate such a finish, it is also sometimes known as an overtime finish. The name alludes to three racing flags:

- Green flag: shown to start or restart the race
- White flag: shown at the start of the last lap
- Checkered flag: shown at the finish of the race

The prescribed number of final laps is usually two. If a caution flag is shown within the specified number of laps of the scheduled finish, then the number of remaining laps will not be decremented until the green flag is shown again. The exact provisions vary between organizations. For some years after 2007, NASCAR on Fox referred to the extra laps after the scheduled number as Overdrive, an allusion to the term overtime used in many other sports. NASCAR officially adopted the term "NASCAR Overtime" in 2016.

== ARCA (2003–present) ==
In the ARCA Menards Series, there is a two-stage version of the rule. The rules are arranged such that the checkered flag must wave under green flag conditions.

- If the final scheduled lap of the race is under caution when the green flag is waved for the restart attempt, there are two laps remaining in the race. If a caution comes out at any time during the first of the two laps, each subsequent restart will be a two-lap restart.
  - If the furled yellow flag with a downwards-pointed finger (one lap before restart in single file formation) is given with two laps remaining in the race, and the restart is on the final scheduled lap, the green and white flag will be waved together and the race will have only one lap remaining.
- If a caution comes out during the final lap (after the white flag has been displayed), the race returns to yellow immediately. On the ensuing restart, a green and white flag are waved to signal one lap is remaining in the race. Should a yellow flag waved before the leader crosses the finish line, the race will continue under yellow until the restart, which again is one lap.

Such a format allows an unlimited number of attempts at a green flag finish. During the event at Gateway International Raceway on July 28, 2006, 22 laps (27.5 miles) were added to the 120-lap (150-mile) scheduled distance.

This version, or a similar variant with no green/white rule, is used in most short tracks.

At Daytona in 2018, the rule was amended to provide only for a one-lap overtime. The green and white would be displayed at the overtime restart, with the checker or yellow ending the race. This was adopted at superspeedway events (Daytona & Talladega) to prevent multiple crashes, which were common at those races, and which were proving very costly to the teams.

== NASCAR ==
=== Regional Series (until 2010) ===
The regional East and West Series (currently run under the ARCA Menards Series banner) used a rule similar to the (now parent) ARCA rule with an unlimited number of attempts. In April 2005, two green-white-checkered attempts were used at Phoenix International Raceway for a then-called NASCAR West Series race.

=== Craftsman Truck Series (1995–2004) ===
The NASCAR Truck Series adopted a green-white-checkered flag rule initially during nationally televised 200-lap exhibition races at Tucson Raceway Park in Arizona.

When the green flag is waved on the restart, there are two laps remaining in the race. If the yellow flag comes out at any time during the restart, each subsequent restart will be a two-lap restart. (From 1995 until mid-1998 and again since 2003, racing back to the caution was prohibited in the series.)

However, if on the restart, there will be just one scheduled lap remaining, there is a green and white flag restart for the lap. That rule was implemented a few times.

In the middle of the 1998 season, however, a rule change by NASCAR affected the rule; if the yellow flag comes out during the final lap of the race, the trucks would race to the finish. (In the middle of the 1998 season, as NASCAR eliminated the two-segment races, NASCAR permitted the trucks to race to the caution.) That rule was eliminated in September 2003 as a result of the ban on racing back to the caution following a dangerous incident in Loudon.

In a July 2004 race at Gateway International Raceway, multiple green-white-checkered restarts resulted in a 160-lap race going 14 additional laps. After that race, the rule was changed to be standardized with NASCAR's other national series, which also adopted the rule.

=== National series (2004–present) ===
Throughout most of its history, NASCAR held to a very strict rule of their races going only to the advertised distance, as indicated on the entry form, in national racing. The only exception was at the NASCAR All-Star Race, an exhibition, non-points, "all star" event. In that event, caution laps would not count during the final segment(s) of the race, in order to ensure the race would have maximum green flag racing. (Not counting the caution laps on the final segment would turn out to be controversial at the 2022 running when Ricky Stenhouse Jr. hit the wall on the final turn of the final lap of that year's race as Ryan Blaney crossed the finish line, resulting in Blaney doing the overtime laps under current overtime rules to secure his victory with an unsecured window net, a safety violation.)

From 2001 to 2002, the other non-points, exhibition event during the season, the Bud Shootout adopted the green-white-checkered rule, if necessary. It was not used during that period.

In the late 1990s, NASCAR's other two national series, the Winston Cup Series and NASCAR Busch Grand National Series, had set a loose precedent that allowed for a red flag to be displayed during a late-race caution flag. At the time, races on the other two national circuits were prohibited from being extended beyond the advertised distance. The action would temporarily halt the race, allowing safety crews to clear the track, and allow for a full restart, without the field having burned up the remaining laps under yellow. Initially, the rule was used only on short tracks, but eventually spread to all races. The implementation was inconsistent and led to controversy and accidents, especially on the two restrictor plate tracks (Daytona International Speedway and Talladega Superspeedway).

- At the 1993 Winston 500 at Talladega, the field went back to green with two laps to go. Through the dogleg towards the finish line, the tightly-bunched field caused Dale Earnhardt to tag Rusty Wallace, causing Wallace to go airborne and flip violently, similar to his earlier wreck at the 1993 Daytona 500.
- At the 1997 Pepsi 400 at Daytona, a restart with one lap to go caused a multi-car crash, which injured Mark Martin.
- At the 2002 Pepsi 400, a late-race caution came out, and participants and spectators expected a red flag. Given the precedents from Wallace's 1993 crash and Martin's 1997 injury, NASCAR chose not to halt the race, citing too few laps remaining, and fans pelted the circuit with cans, seat cushions, and other debris as it finished under yellow. In response to the controversy, for 2003 and 2004, the red flag rules were clarified somewhat to standardize the use, with a specific lap, usually five laps remaining, being the lap designated as the "last red flag lap." Television would mention such a lap during the race specifics on broadcasts.
- In late 2003, NASCAR, in an unrelated move, introduced the rule officially known as free pass (better known as the "lucky dog") and prohibited drivers from racing back to the start/finish line when yellow flags were displayed after Casey Mears, attempting to gain a lap back, nearly ran into a stalled Dale Jarrett in such an instance. The field was frozen at the onset of the yellow based on the last timing interval. The unforeseen combination of this new rule with the last red flag lap rule would create unexpected problems and controversy at the 2004 Aaron's 499 at Talladega. As Jeff Gordon and Dale Earnhardt Jr. were racing for the lead with five laps remaining, the field was working Lap 184 of 188, beyond the point of when a red flag could halt the race (the last red flag lap was 184). As Earnhardt Jr. was passing Gordon for the lead, Brian Vickers spun in turn three. When the caution was displayed, freezing the field, it was determined that Gordon's car was just ahead of Earnhardt's, and Gordon was scored as the leader, and thus, the winner. On the final lap, some angry fans again threw debris (seat cushions, alcoholic beverage bottles) on the track at Gordon's car, which angered many observers, including Fox commentators Chris Myers and Jeff Hammond.

In the wake of the controversies, in mid-July 2004, all three touring series adopted a new, revised green-white-checkered rule. The revised format handles late-race cautions in a standardized manner. The rule was adopted in 2011 for all NASCAR regional series, and adopted in 2012 for Euro Race Car after NASCAR took over sanctioning of the series as a NASCAR regional series.

==== Caution after the leader starts final lap or after third restart in situation ====
The race is over. Positions are frozen at the moment of the yellow flag, and the scoring is official as cars cross the finish line. The second point is a critical one: cars must be able to complete the final lap under their own power. The 2007 LifeLock 400 was somewhat controversial for this reason. Greg Biffle was the leader on the final lap when the caution flag was shown, but his car then ran out of fuel. Biffle was not able to maintain pace car speed, but he did manage to coast across the finish line and was awarded the win despite being passed by some cars while under caution.

There is a notable exception to this rule. If there is an incident during the final lap behind the leaders, and the run to the finish line is clear for the leaders, NASCAR may delay the caution until the checkered flag is shown, allowing the leaders to race for the win. In such cases track safety workers may arrive at the scene of the incident. This exception was used at the 2007 Daytona 500 during a last lap wreck in the tri-oval, the 2009 Aaron's 499 when Carl Edwards went airborne into the catch fence off Ryan Newman's hood and came to a rest in the middle of the track as cars skirted to either side to cross the line, the 2013 Daytona 500 where a small wreck occurred in turn 2 at the back of the pack, and the 2013 Coke Zero 400 where two wrecks unfolded on the last lap – one in turn 2 and another coming to the tri-oval.

==== Caution with two laps remaining in scheduled distance or after an invalid green-white-checkered restart ====
If a caution period starts, or continues, any time with two laps remaining in the scheduled distance, NASCAR allows at least one attempt to finish the race under green flag conditions. From 2004 through 2009, one attempt was allowed; starting in 2010, up to three attempts can be made. This began with the 2010 Budweiser Shootout. With two laps to go, during an official green-white checkered, Jeff Gordon got into the back of Greg Biffle, creating a multi-car wreck and giving the win to Kevin Harvick. Following a controversy surrounding the 2015 CampingWorld.com 500 at Talladega, in which Harvick made questionable moves with a damaged car in the final restart attempt in order to secure his playoff position, NASCAR moved to infinite attempts in 2016, among other rule changes instituted after Austin Dillon's accident at the 2015 Coke Zero 400. The 2018 Daytona 300 Xfinity race had five attempts to finish in overtime -- Lap 122, 130, 133, 138, 142, with the Lap 142 restart being successful. If a green-white-checker attempt results in circuit damage (catchfencing) or inclement weather (rain if it is not a flat short track or road course, or in all instances, fog, lighting, darkness on circuits without lights, or curfew), the race may be declared complete (as was the case during the 2014 Food City 500, where an accidental triggering of the caution lights led to a safety car, but weather made the point moot).

When it is determined that the track is clear for racing, the green flag is shown, indicating the restart. As the leader completes the first lap, the white flag is shown, signaling the final lap. As the leader completes the second lap, the checkered flag is shown, signaling the conclusion of the race.

From 2010 until 2015, if the caution flag was shown during the first of the two laps, positions would be frozen as they would be during a regular race caution, and a second green-white-checker attempt would be made, up to a maximum of three attempts. From February 2016 until August 2017, the rule was changed so that an "overtime line" was established (usually halfway on the penultimate lap), and if a caution on a green-white-checkered attempt occurs before that line is passed, another attempt is made at a restart, until a valid restart has been made (defined as the race leader reaching the overtime line under green). Beginning at Watkins Glen in August 2017, NASCAR, seeking to eliminate controversial finishes, moved the overtime line back to the start-finish line, essentially returning to the 2010-2015 rules but with unlimited attempts to finish under green.

Starting in 2024, if the one to go signal is given immediately after the time limit is reached (when two laps remain), the restart shall be only one lap.

==== Caution on a valid green-white-checkered restart ====
The race will have no further extensions once the leader has taken the white flag, at which point the next flag ends the race, caution or checkered. In the event of a race ending due to caution, video evidence is used in addition to scoring loops to determine the official order of finish.

A green-white-checkered finish will extend the race beyond its advertised distance, and competitors are not allowed to pit for fuel without giving up track position. Teams are responsible for considering the extended distance in their fuel strategies. However, if the cleanup is expected to take considerable time, NASCAR may red flag the race with the cars on the track, so that cars do not consume all their fuel while under caution.

== Other uses ==
Often short track races that run less than 55 km (35 miles) will use a rule that states no caution laps count. This is commonplace for typical weekly feature races that are under 100 laps. Typical midget and sprint car races will not count caution laps.

Other short track races (especially those of 100 laps or more) will use a rule stating the last five laps must be run under green flag conditions, often with a rule stating five consecutive laps must be run under green. If a caution occurs during the last five laps, the counter may be reset, depending on the track, and the five laps begins on the ensuing restart.

British Superbike Championship motorcycle racing uses a similar rule after two-thirds of the race has been completed. After two-thirds of the race laps (rounded down) have been completed, if a caution is called, the race will be extended by three laps.

For example, in an 18-lap race, the caution is waved on the 14th lap (two-thirds is 12 laps). The caution period lasts three laps, with the safety car coming in at the end of the 16th lap, effectively calling the restart on Lap 17. which would be two laps remaining. However, British Superbike rules state that once two-thirds of the race distance is passed, the first three laps of a caution "do not count as race laps," similar to short-track racing, thereby implementing a green-white-checkered style rule where the three laps are added to the scheduled race distance, thereby making the race a total of 21 laps.
