= 2003 in NASCAR =

The following NASCAR national series were held in 2003:

- 2003 NASCAR Winston Cup Series - The top racing series in NASCAR.
- 2003 NASCAR Busch Series - The second-highest racing series in NASCAR.
- 2003 NASCAR Craftsman Truck Series - The third-highest racing series in NASCAR.

Preceded by 2002 in NASCAR	NASCAR seasons 2003	Succeeded by 2004 in NASCAR
