= Free pass (NASCAR) =

Rule in motor racing

The free pass, commonly referred to as the "lucky dog" and formerly the "beneficiary rule", is a rule in some motor racing leagues allowing the closest lapped driver to the front of the field to gain back a lap when a caution is called. The driver is called to move to the end of the longest line of the cars at the end of that caution period. This rule was instituted to prevent drivers from racing back to the start/finish line when a caution was called.

The rule was first implemented by NASCAR in the 2003 seasons of its three national series, and in all NASCAR-sanctioned series by 2005.

== Background ==
Before the rule was installed, drivers would "race back to the caution"; however, there was a gentlemen's agreement not to race, but to slow down and not pass, to allow slower cars to get their laps back. During the Sylvania 300 at New Hampshire International Speedway, Casey Mears came close to contacting the stalled car of Dale Jarrett while racing back to the line during a caution caused by Jarrett's crash. NASCAR chose to abandon the practice and stop racing immediately in the wake of the incident. The rule was created as a way of continuing the practice of yielding to the slower cars without sacrificing safety.

== Naming ==
The popular term for this rule, "lucky dog", was first used by Benny Parsons in 2003 during a TNT broadcast at Dover International Speedway. His boothmate Wally Dallenbach Jr., concurred when Jimmy Spencer, who drove a car sponsored by Sirius Satellite Radio (whose company mascot was a dog, named "Deejay Mongobot"), saying, "That IS a lucky dog." This became used by all NBC and TNT broadcasts, along with the Performance Racing Network radio broadcasts. The term is also used by NASCAR SimRacing and iRacing, among other licensed NASCAR video games produced after the rule was implemented.

Another oft-used term, "free pass", was first used by Mike Joy during the 2004 broadcast of the Subway 400 at North Carolina Speedway in Rockingham, North Carolina. Sometimes, Larry McReynolds, especially during the 2004 season, would refer to it as a pardon (sometimes accompanied by "from the Oval Office"; "Oval Office" is a term referring to the NASCAR mobile office and the proper series logo), and sometimes Darrell Waltrip uses it only for the #38 Robert Yates Racing Ford and later #18 Joe Gibbs Racing Toyota, because that car is sponsored by Mars, Incorporated, which manufactures the Pedigree dog food brand. It is used by MRN Radio and Fox Sports by its main announcers, and is used by the Fox graphics package. (Between 2007 and 2014, TNT's coverage is produced by Fox Sports; as part of the 2009 restart rule changes, the TNT graphics package states the driver with the Free Pass and Wave-Around before the restart.)

On Speed Channel and ESPN the term "Aaron's Lucky Dog" (which is the Aaron's corporate mascot, and is part of its branding) is used. During ESPN broadcasts, it is used only when it is officially awarded. During ESPN broadcasts, Jerry Punch follows the code established by ESPN producer Neil Goldberg, using Free Pass (which was Goldberg's policy on Fox).

In the NASCAR Pinty's Series, the term "VTech Lucky Dog" is a contingency award among drivers who were granted free passes during the race. The highest-finishing driver who had earned a free pass lap wins a CAD 1,000 prize.

=== Reception ===
The use of the term "lucky dog" is often criticized by specific Fox staff members for not being informative and producer Neil Goldberg, who has since moved to ESPN. Mike Joy has mocked the term on Fox broadcasts, first in March 2005 during the Busch Series Telcel-Motorola 200 at the Autodromo Hermanos Rodriguez, where a dog ran across the track during a caution, and in April 2006 during the DirecTV 500 in Martinsville Speedway, where Joy referred to Ryan Newman's love of pets and said despite his love of dogs, he hadn't been a lucky dog.

During a 2004 conversation with fans on the Fox Sports website, Waltrip said, "You're not lucky, and you're not a dog. You just happen to be the recipient of a free pass. You get to go around the track and get back on the lead lap."

Conversely, Goldberg told the NASCAR.com Viewer's Guide in April 2004 the term "free pass" suits the audience easily because "it easily bridged us into explaining of what it is each time it happens." He also mentioned, for new viewers, the Fox terminology is easier to explain, especially since "we feel 'free pass' signals something happening better than throwing out the term 'lucky dog.'"

Later, however, Fox (and ESPN) agreed to use the term on-air after rent-to-own company Aaron's paid to sponsor the 'award', even creating a cartoon dog character to accompany the captioning. The term continued to be in use after Aaron's eventually ended the sponsorship of the 'award' in the telecasts. NASCAR currently uses the "free pass" term on their official website and rulebook when referring to the rule.

== Conditions ==
The rule applies regardless of the number of laps a car is behind the leader. Furthermore, a driver may not receive a free pass lap in certain situations:

- The driver caused the situation bringing out the yellow.
- The driver had been penalized one (or more) laps for rough driving. This rule may be waived if the driver passes the leader and regains his lap back, and then is passed back.

There are two restrictions on the pitting in regard to the free pass:

- The driver pits with the lap-down cars, unless officials declare a quick yellow, when all cars may pit.
- During that pit stop, it is the only lap that car may take fuel. This rule was implemented October 30, 2004, after Ryan Newman won the first race with the free pass by stopping for fuel multiple times after gaining the free pass during that caution period, resulting in a win.

In 2006, NASCAR extended the use of this rule at road course races.

In June 2009, double-file restart rule changes resulted in changes to the free pass rule:

- The free pass would now be implemented during the entire race. Previously, the free pass was discontinued when less than ten laps remained in the race.
- After pit stops, once the starter signals one lap before the restart, the pit is closed, and all cars between the safety car and leader will be allowed to advance to the rear of the field. The leader will be the first car on the restart. Cars that were not waved around (such as lead lap cars, but not the beneficiary) will be allowed to pit.
  - Such a situation occurs when the leaders pit, but some lapped cars do not pit. This usually occurs when different pit strategies are used between leaders, or when a cycle of pit stops is interrupted by a caution; those cars which have pitted and are lapped will take the wave-around, restarting behind the leaders who pitted, and advancing one lap.

The 2009 NASCAR rule change brings it in line with Grand-Am road racing, while rules where lapped cars between leaders may gain one lap were adopted in Formula One as of 2007. The lapped-car rule in Formula One applies when the "lapped cars may overtake" signal appears on team monitors from race control.

In the IndyCar Series, lapped cars ahead of the leader following pit stops (which may happen if a lapped car does not pit during yellow when the lead lap cars do so) are allowed to move to the tail end of the lead lap on restarts on the one lap to go signal—which automatically closes the pit lane until the restart. This ensures that the leaders take the green flag without interference from lapped traffic. NASCAR follows the same policy with the 2009 change to the free pass, except that pit lane is only closed to those cars that were waved around the safety car to allow the leaders to start at the front.

== Statistics ==
According to Jayski.com, seven drivers have won a race being the beneficiary in NASCAR Cup Series alone, with two drivers doing it twice.

1. Ryan Newman, Dover, September 2003 and Michigan, June 2004
2. Mark Martin, Dover, June 2004
3. Jeff Gordon, Martinsville, April 2005
4. Kyle Busch, Phoenix, November 2005 and Talladega, April 2008
5. Kurt Busch, Bristol, March 2006
6. Kasey Kahne, Michigan, June 2006
7. Joey Logano, New Hampshire, June 2009
8. Kevin Harvick, Daytona, July 2010

Another notable win that occurred with a driver receiving the Beneficiary rule was when Aric Almirola and Denny Hamlin (who was not credited for the win) won the 2007 AT&T 250 in the NASCAR Xfinity Series after their driver change put them a lap down.

Most beneficiaries accumulated in a race:

1. Michael McDowell, 6, Atlanta, February 2025, finished 13th
2. Noah Gragson, 6, Bristol Dirt, April 2022, finished 27th
3. Jamie McMurray, 6, Talladega, May 2014, finished 29th
4. Kyle Busch, 5, Watkins Glen, August 2006, finished 9th
5. David Reutimann, 5, Daytona, July 2008, finished 21st
6. Joe Nemechek, 5, New Hampshire, July 2013, finished 25th
7. Kevin Lepage, 4, Charlotte, October 2005, finished 21st
8. Bobby Labonte, 4, Talladega, April 2007, finished 20th
9. David Gilliland, 4, Talladega, October 2007, finished 27th
10. Kevin Lepage, 3, Charlotte, May 2005, finished 21st
11. Kevin Lepage, 3, Chicago, July 2005, finished 28th
12. Mike Wallace, 3, Bristol, August 2005, finished 17th
13. Dale Earnhardt Jr., 3, Bristol, August 2005, finished 9th
14. Kyle Petty, 3, Talladega, October 2005, finished 24th
15. Rusty Wallace, 3, Charlotte, October 2005, finished 24th
16. Terry Labonte, 3, Bristol, March 2006, finished 27th
17. Jeff Gordon, 3. Martinsville, April 2005, finished 1st
18. Jeff Gordon, 3, Indianapolis, August 2006, finished 16th
19. David Stremme, 3, Michigan, August 2006, finished 28th
20. David Ragan, 3, Martinsville, October 2006, finished 25th
21. Jimmie Johnson, 3, Pocono, August 2009, finished 13th

NOTE: Kyle Busch was the beneficiary in five consecutive caution periods at the 2006 AMD at the Glen; the beneficiary rule was not used on road course events in 2004. The first driver not on the lead lap—no matter how many laps they are behind the leader—gains one lap back per beneficiary; another reason the rule is somewhat unpopular. In Busch's case, he lost five laps from repairs caused by an oil leak, and upon returning to the track, gained all five laps back through the beneficiary rule because no other driver was between him and the lead lap on any of the caution periods.

Aric Almirola and Denny Hamlin (who was not credited for the win) won the 2007 AT&T 250 put them a lap down.
