= 1986 Pocono 500 =

(United States) 1986 Pocono 500
Race details
- 10th round of the 1986 CART PPG Indy Car World Series season
- Date: August 17, 1986
- Official name: 1986 Domino's Pizza 500
- Location: Long Pond, Pennsylvania
- Course: Permanent racing facility 2.5 mi / 4.023 km
- Distance: 200 laps 500 mi / 804.672 km
- Weather: Temperatures up to 80 °F (27 °C); wind speeds up to 14 miles per hour (23 km/h)

Pole position
- Driver: (United States) Michael Andretti (Kraco Enterprises)
- Time: 205.724 mph

Podium
- First: (United States) Mario Andretti (Newman/Haas Racing)
- Second: (United States) Kevin Cogan (Patrick Racing)
- Third: (United States) Pancho Carter (Galles Racing)

The 1986 Pocono 500, the 16th running of the event, was held at the Pocono Raceway in Long Pond, Pennsylvania, on Sunday, August 17, 1986. Branded as the 1986 Domino's Pizza 500 for sponsorship reasons, the race was won by Mario Andretti in his 14th attempt to win the Pocono 500 at the track near his Pennsylvania home.

== Background ==
Pocono Raceway was hurt financially by CART boycotts of the 1979 and 1981 races. Pocono filed an antitrust lawsuit against CART seeking $9 million in damages in July 1981. As part of the settlement, CART agreed to lease and promote the Pocono 500 for a period of five years. At the end of the contract in 1986, there were questions over whether the race would continue.

Mario Andretti said, "I know the contract runs out this year but I can't see our series being without Pocono."

CART Director of Administration, John Caponigro, affirmed that the series wanted to remain at Pocono. "This is an oval and the area is potentially a hotbed of Indy-car fans. We do want to come back."

Track owner, Joseph Mattioli insisted the track wanted Indy car to return. "We used to have this place loaded (for the Indy car race) and we would prefer to have this race than not have it. If I can have some fun and make some money without aggravation, yes. If the aggravation quotient is high and there's a high risk in making money, I'll go the other way."

Ultimately, in October 1986, the track agreed to promote the race the beginning in 1987.

Bobby Rahal won the 1986 Indianapolis 500. Johnny Rutherford won the 1986 Michigan 500.

== Practice and Time Trials ==
=== Practice - Thursday, August 14 ===
Michael Andretti posted the fastest speed in the opening day of practice on Thursday, August 14. Andretti's speed of 203.542 mph was faster than Rick Mears' speed of 202.904 mph.

Practice was stopped for three and a half hour to fix a repaving job in turn two. According to CART director of operations Kirk Russell, "We redid Turn 2 Sunday and put the sealer on Tuesday. The trucks sitting near the patched area must have leaked diesel fuel, which penetrated the track, leaving two holes about two feet wide and 2-4 inches deep. We had to chop that out and put on quick-setting concrete."

=== Qualifying - Friday, August 15 ===
In Friday's qualifying session, Michael Andretti broke the track record with a speed of 205.724 mph. Johnny Rutherford backed up his Michigan 500 win by posting the second fastest qualifying speed at 203.114 mph. Mario Andretti qualified on the outside of the front row at 201.866 mph.

Tom Sneva cut a tire and crashed in Friday qualifying. He went to a backup car, one that was set up for the next race at the Mid-Ohio road course. Dale Coyne was the slowest qualifier with a speed of 151.189 mph, over 54 mph slower than the pole speed.

=== Qualifying Day 2 - Saturday, August 16 ===
In Saturday's final day of qualifying, Tom Sneva was unable to make a lap in his backup car. He was added to the field as a promoter's option.

On Saturday, A. J. Foyt hosted a wedding in his garage. He served as best man for Carl Boyer and Judy Anderson of Lebanon, Pennsylvania.

== Support Races ==
Jeff Andretti passed Mike Groff on the last lap to win the American Racing Series event on Saturday. The 22-year-old son of Mario Andretti earned his first career victory in the series.

On race morning, a go-kart race was held on the frontstretch for the wives of the drivers. The race was won by Geoff Brabham's wife, followed by Roberto Guerrero's wife.

== Race ==
An estimated 45,000 spectators were on hand for the race, called by observers as the largest since CART sanctioning began in 1982.

When the race began, Michael Andretti led the field into turn one. In response to a malfunctioning caution light displayed in the turn, Andretti slowed down, allowing Rutherford to take the lead. In turn two, Scott Brayton spun 360 degrees and was hit by Dennis Firestone. Johnny Parsons spun backwards into the wall to avoid the crash. All drivers were unhurt but none of the cars could continue.

The second caution came out on lap 14 when Ed Pimm stalled in turn three. After repairs, Pimm returned to the race ten laps down. The third caution came out on lap 25 when Pimm and Al Unser crashed in turn one. Pimm suffered a fractured right forearm. After leading the first 26 laps, Rutherford came into the pits. This gave the lead to Mario Andretti.

On lap 39, Emerson Fittipaldi had a wheel fall off in turn one. He pulled into the infield and retired from the race.

After 48 laps, Johnny Rutherford blew a right-front tire and hit the wall in turn two. Bobby Rahal and Michael Andretti both suffered damage to their cars from accident debris. Andretti pitted which gave the lead to Kevin Cogan. On the restart, Rick Mears passed Cogan for the lead entering turn one. Andretti retook the lead on lap 74 when Mears pitted.

When it was Andretti's time to pit on lap 85, he entered the pits too fast, locked up the front wheels, and almost hit his front tire changer, Carl Dean. Rules forbid drivers from reversing on pit road, meaning Andretti had to go around another lap before coming back for his pit stop.

Danny Sullivan fell out of the race while running second on lap 96 with a bad water pump.

Rick Mears was looking to become the first driver to win the Pocono 500 in consecutive years and led 46 laps. However, he dropped out of contention on lap 127 when CART officials black-flagged Mears for having a loose rear wing. The team needed 12 laps to replace the wing, which they took off of Sullivan's car.

Andretti returned to the lead upon Mears' problem and pulled out to a large lead. After 89 laps of green flag racing, the caution came out on lap 145 when Josele Garza spun in turn one.

Two cars were left in contention, with Andretti holding a safe lead over Rahal. Final pit stops came under green with 25 laps remaining. Leaving the pits after refueling, Rahal's car caught on fire and he stopped at the exit of turn one.

Andretti raced to an easy victory of one lap over Kevin Cogan. It was Andretti's 14th attempt to win at his home track. A. J. Foyt finished 4th, his first top-5 finish in an Indy car race since 1982. The local Pennsylvania crowd was elated at Andretti's victory and chanted "Mario! Mario!" as he drove to victory lane.

"This is one of the happiest weekends I've ever had," Andretti said after the race. It marked Andrettis winning the Pocono 500 pole, the ARS race, and the Pocono 500. Weeks later, Andretti said, "People had been expecting me to win at Pocono for so many years because living in nearby Nazareth, I considered it my home track. I think it finally took one of my boys to break the ice. With Michael winning the pole and Jeff winning the ARS race, the pressure was on me to win."

Andretti's win was the first on a superspeedway for Goodyear's radial tire.

Andretti's car-owner, Paul Newman, also won on this weekend. Newman earned his second win in the Trans-Am Series at Lime Rock Park in Connecticut on Saturday. Newman watched the race from the pits with actress Marsha Mason.

By virtue of his second-place finishes at Indianapolis and Pocono, Kevin Cogan scored the most points in the IndyCar Triple Crown of 500 mile races and was awarded a $10,000 prize from Domino's.

== Box score ==
Finish	Grid	No	Name	Entrant	Chassis	Engine	Laps	Time/Status	Led	Points
1	3	5	(United States) Mario Andretti	Newman/Haas Racing	Lola T86/00	Cosworth	200	3:17:13.800	119	21
2	5	7	(United States) Kevin Cogan	Patrick Racing	March 86C	Cosworth	199	+1 Lap	7	16
3	21	15	(United States) Pancho Carter	Galles Racing	Lola T86/00	Cosworth	198	+2 Laps	0	14
4	12	14	(United States) A. J. Foyt	A. J. Foyt Enterprises	March 86C	Cosworth	197	+3 Laps	0	12
5	15	22	(Brazil) Raul Boesel	Dick Simon Racing	Lola T86/00	Cosworth	197	+3 Laps	0	10
6	22	30	(United States) Al Unser Jr.	Doug Shierson Racing	Lola T86/00	Cosworth	195	+5 Laps	0	8
7	16	55	(Mexico) Josele Garza	Machinists Union Racing	March 86C	Cosworth	194	+6 Laps	0	6
8	6	1	(United States) Rick Mears	Penske Racing	March 86C	Cosworth	188	+12 Laps	46	5
9	26	84	(United States) Sammy Swindell	A. J. Foyt Enterprises	March 86C	Cosworth	187	+13 Laps	0	4
10	25	9	(Brazil) Roberto Moreno	Galles Racing	Lola T86/00	Cosworth	186	+14 Laps	0	3
11	1	18	(United States) Michael Andretti	Kraco Racing	March 86C	Cosworth	185	Engine	0	3
12	17	8	(Australia) Geoff Brabham	Galles Racing	Lola T86/00	Judd-Honda	184	+16 Laps	0	1
13	18	24	(United States) Gary Bettenhausen	Leader Card Racers	March 86C	Cosworth	179	Off course	0	0
14	4	3	(United States) Bobby Rahal	Truesports	March 86C	Cosworth	176	Throttle	2	0
15	29	33	(United States) Tom Sneva	Mike Curb Racing	March 86C	Cosworth	114	CV joint	0	0
16	9	4	(United States) Danny Sullivan	Penske Racing	March 86C	Cosworth	96	Water pump	0	0
17	20	61	(Netherlands) Arie Luyendyk	Provimi Veal Racing	March 86C	Cosworth	74	Ignition	0	0
18	2	21	(United States) Johnny Rutherford	Alex Morales Motorsports	March 86C	Cosworth	48	Crash	26	0
19	11	20	(Brazil) Emerson Fittipaldi	Patrick Racing	March 86C	Cosworth	38	Crash	0	0
20	10	11	(United States) Al Unser	Penske Racing	March 86C	Ilmor-Chevrolet	24	Crash	0	0
21	7	2	(Colombia) Roberto Guerrero	Bignotti-Cotter Racing	March 86C	Cosworth	23	Piston	0	0
22	24	10	(United States) Spike Gehlhausen	JP Racing	Lola T900	Cosworth	22	Engine	0	0
23	23	23	(United States) Dick Simon	Dick Simon Racing	Lola T86/00	Cosworth	16	Oil pressure	0	0
24	8	66	(United States) Ed Pimm	Mike Curb Racing	March 86C	Cosworth	14	Crash	0	0
25	27	56	(United States) Rocky Moran	Gohr Racing	March 85C	Buick	10	Engine	0	0
26	28	19	(United States) Dale Coyne	Dale Coyne Racing	Coyne DC1	Chevrolet	5	Engine	0	0
27	13	71	(United States) Scott Brayton	Hemelgarn Racing	March 86C	Cosworth	0	Crash	0	0
28	14	36	(Australia) Dennis Firestone	Raynor Motorsports	Lola T86/00	Cosworth	0	Crash	0	0
29	19	59	(United States) Johnny Parsons	Machinists Union Racing	March 86C	Cosworth	0	Crash	0	0

=== Race statistics ===
Lap Leaders
Laps	Leader
1–26	Johnny Rutherford
27–49	Mario Andretti
50–56	Kevin Cogan
57–73	Rick Mears
74–84	Mario Andretti
85	Bobby Rahal
86–103	Rick Mears
104–116	Mario Andretti
117–127	Rick Mears
128–173	Mario Andretti
174	Bobby Rahal
175–200	Mario Andretti

Cautions: 7 for 43 laps
Laps	Reason
1–6	Dennis Firestone, Johnny Parsons, and Scott Brayton crash turn 2
14–18	Ed Pimm tow-in
26–31	Al Unser and Ed Pimm crash turn 1
39–44	Emerson Fittipaldi crash
49–55	Johnny Rutherford crash
145–149	Josele Garza spin turn 1
175–182	Bobby Rahal engine fire

== Broadcasting ==
For the second straight year, the Pocono 500 was broadcast by ESPN. Bob Jenkins and Derek Daly were the play-by-play announcers. Gary Lee was the pit reporter.
