= 1986 Michigan 500 =

Coordinates: 42°03′58.68″N 84°14′29.18″W

(United States) 1986 Michigan 500
Race details
- Race 9 of 17 in the 1986 CART season
- Date: August 2, 1986
- Official name: 1986 Michigan 500
- Location: Michigan International Speedway, Brooklyn, Michigan, United States
- Course: Permanent racing facility 2.000 mi / 3.219 km
- Distance: 250 laps 500.000 mi / 804.672 km
- Weather: Partly Cloudy with temperatures up to 82 °F (28 °C); wind speeds reaching up to 17 miles per hour (27 km/h)

Pole position
- Driver: (United States) Rick Mears (Team Penske)
- Time: 223.401 mph (359.529 km/h)

Podium
- First: (United States) Johnny Rutherford (Alex Morales Racing)
- Second: (Mexico) Josele Garza (Machinist Union Racing Team)
- Third: (United States) Pancho Carter (Galles Racing)

The 1986 Michigan 500, the sixth running of the event, was held at the Michigan International Speedway in Brooklyn, Michigan, on Saturday, August 2, 1986. The race was won by Johnny Rutherford, his 27th and final Indy Car victory. It was Rutherford's sixth win in IndyCar racing's Triple Crown of 500 mile races, and his first at the Michigan 500. The event was race number 9 of 17 in the 1986 CART PPG Indy Car World Series.

== Background ==
After years of being defined by a rough, bumpy, asphalt surface, Michigan International Speedway was repaved in the spring of 1986. The smooth new surface produced higher grips and higher speeds. In testing on July 23, Rick Mears ran a lap speed of 222.5 mph. It was unofficially the first time an Indy car ran a lap speed over 220 mph.

As was the case the past three years, Domino's Pizza offered a one million dollar bonus to any driver who could win IndyCar's Triple Crown of 500 Mile Races: The Indianapolis 500, Michigan 500, and Pocono 500. Bobby Rahal won the 1986 Indianapolis 500 and entered Michigan still eligible to win the million dollars.

== Practice and Time Trials ==
Practice opened on Wednesday, July 30. Bobby Rahal set the fastest practice speed at 220.723 mph. Rick Mears was second at 220.467 mph. Roberto Guerrero, Ed Pimm, and Randy Lanier comprised the top-five fastest cars.

The opening round of Time Trials was held on Thursday, July 31. Rick Mears broke the world closed-course speed record with a lap of 223.401 mph. The previous record had been 221.160, set by Mark Donohue at Talladega Superspeedway in August 1975. Mears was nearly four miles per hour faster than Al Unser in second place at 219.552 mph. Bobby Rahal completed the front row with a speed of 218.759 mph.

Roughly one hour after his pole-winning time, Rick Mears crashed his car in turn two. After losing control, the car impacted the wall and damaged the nose and left-front suspension. If Mears's team was unable to repair the car, he would have lost his pole position and had to start from the rear of the field.

Upon inspection, the crew found Mears's crash was the result of a failure of the right-rear CV Joint. Mears's Team Penske crew worked 15 hours to repair to car by Friday morning.

During practice on Friday, Bobby Rahal set the fastest speed at 217.753 mph. Mears's repaired car was second fastest at 217.615 mph. Roberto Moreno crashed in turn two and suffered damage to the right side of the car. His team was able to repair the vehicle before the race. Geoff Brabham's team withdrew his Cosworth powered car and substituted it with a Judd powered car. The change meant he would start the race in last position.

== Race ==
At the start of the race, Rick Mears took the lead. On only the third lap, Steve Chassey crashed in turn two to bring out the first caution of the race.

Rain began to fall on lap 14. The race was stopped for 90 minutes while the shower passed and the track dried.

When the race restarted, Michael Andretti held the lead for 15 laps. Roberto Guerrero charged to the lead, passing Andretti to the inside in turn one on lap 37. After 11 laps in the lead, Guerrero hit oil in turn three and spun backwards into the wall. Guerrero was knocked unconscious in the wreck but soon walked to the ambulance and was transported to a local hospital where he was released later that afternoon. Mario Andretti and Tom Sneva also crashed out of the race in single car incidents.

On lap 100, Randy Lanier crashed in turn three, impacting the wall hard with the right side of the car. Lanier suffered a fractured right leg and underwent surgery later that night. Two trackside observers for CART were struck by debris and hospitalized. Robert Vanice suffered a laceration to the back of his head and Brian Brown was struck in the back. Both were treated and released at a local hospital. It ultimately was the last auto race for Lanier who was indicted and later convicted on drug smuggling charges in October 1986.

Throughout the midway point of the race, Bobby Rahal and Rick Mears led significant portions of the event. Both drivers would retire with engine failures.

While leading on lap 195, Michael Andretti blew an engine and brought out the ninth caution of the day. That gave the lead to Johnny Rutherford.

With eight laps remaining, the third-place car driven by Geoff Brabham lost power in turn two and was hit from behind by Al Unser Jr. Brabham hit the outside wall and Unser spun to the infield. Unser lost his front and rear wings, had a damaged nose, and wired the oil cooler to the gearbox, but returned to the track and finished the race in 8th. Because of the high attrition, Brabham still finished fourth.

The race restarted with four laps to go. By running laps over 217 mph (over 5 mph faster than his qualifying speed), Rutherford extended his lead over Josele Garza who was seeking his first win. Garza was unable to catch Rutherford who won the Michigan 500 by 1.82 seconds.

Rutherford became the first driver to win 500 mile Indy car races at all four tracks that held them: Indianapolis, Ontario, Pocono, and Michigan.

Only seven of the 28 starters finished the race. The 10 cautions slowed the average speed to 137.139 mph.

== Box score ==
Finish	Grid	No	Name	Entrant	Chassis	Engine	Laps	Time/Status	Led	Points
1	14	21	(United States) Johnny Rutherford	Alex Morales Motorsports	March 86C	Cosworth	250	3:38:45.320	56	20
2	22	55	(Mexico) Josele Garza	Machinists Union Racing	March 86C	Cosworth	250	+1.820	0	16
3	15	15	(United States) Pancho Carter	Galles Racing	Lola T86/00	Cosworth	248	+2 Laps	0	14
4	28	8	(Australia) Geoff Brabham	Galles Racing	Lola T86/00	Judd-Honda	239	Crash	0	12
5	24	22	(Brazil) Raul Boesel	Dick Simon Racing	Lola T86/00	Cosworth	239	+11 Laps	0	10
6	19	9	(Brazil) Roberto Moreno	Galles Racing	Lola T86/00	Cosworth	238	+12 Laps	0	8
7	27	10	(United States) Spike Gehlhausen	JP Racing	Lola T900	Cosworth	237	+13 Laps	0	6
8	20	30	(United States) Al Unser Jr.	Doug Shierson Racing	Lola T86/00	Cosworth	235	+15 Laps	0	5
9	11	14	(United States) A. J. Foyt	A. J. Foyt Enterprises	March 86C	Cosworth	229	Engine	0	4
10	3	3	(United States) Bobby Rahal	Truesports	March 86C	Cosworth	219	Engine	64	4
11	6	18	(United States) Michael Andretti	Kraco Racing	March 86C	Cosworth	195	Engine	53	2
12	1	1	(United States) Rick Mears	Penske Racing	March 86C	Cosworth	181	Engine	50	2
13	17	71	(United States) Scott Brayton	Hemelgarn Racing	March 86C	Cosworth	167	CV joint	0	0
14	2	11	(United States) Al Unser	Penske Racing	March 86C	Ilmor-Chevrolet	164	Engine	0	0
15	7	66	(United States) Ed Pimm	Mike Curb Racing	March 86C	Cosworth	163	Engine	0	0
16	18	59	(United States) Johnny Parsons	Machinists Union Racing	March 86C	Cosworth	126	Crash	0	0
17	21	36	(Australia) Dennis Firestone	Raynor Motorsports	Lola T86/00	Cosworth	123	Engine	0	0
18	8	33	(United States) Tom Sneva	Mike Curb Racing	March 86C	Cosworth	110	Crash	12	0
19	5	12	(United States) Randy Lanier	Arciero Racing	March 86C	Cosworth	98	Crash	1	0
20	13	20	(Brazil) Emerson Fittipaldi	Patrick Racing	March 86C	Cosworth	82	Engine	1	0
21	10	5	(United States) Mario Andretti	Newman/Haas Racing	Lola T86/00	Cosworth	69	Crash	0	0
22	12	7	(United States) Kevin Cogan	Patrick Racing	March 86C	Cosworth	63	Handling	0	0
23	16	61	(Netherlands) Arie Luyendyk	Provimi Veal Racing	March 86C	Cosworth	50	Oil leak	0	0
24	4	2	(Colombia) Roberto Guerrero	Bignotti-Cotter Racing	March 86C	Cosworth	47	Crash	13	0
25	9	4	(United States) Danny Sullivan	Penske Racing	March 86C	Cosworth	33	Suspension	0	0
26	23	24	(United States) Gary Bettenhausen	Leader Card Racers	March 86C	Cosworth	15	Oil leak	0	0
27	25	84	(United States) George Snider	A. J. Foyt Enterprises	March 86C	Cosworth	9	Handling	0	0
28	26	56	(United States) Steve Chassey	Gohr Racing	March 86C	Buick	2	Crash	0	0

=== Failed to qualify ===
- (United States) Dale Coyne (#19)

=== Race statistics ===
Lap Leaders
Laps	Leader
1–7	Rick Mears
8–9	Roberto Guerrero
10–21	Rick Mears
22–36	Michael Andretti
37–47	Roberto Guerrero
48	Emerson Fittipaldi
49–62	Rick Mears
63–70	Bobby Rahal
71–75	Tom Sneva
76	Randy Lanier
77–99	Bobby Rahal
100–106	Tom Sneva
107–116	Bobby Rahal
117–119	Michael Andretti
120–136	Rick Mears
137–155	Bobby Rahal
156–168	Michael Andretti
169–172	Bobby Rahal
173–182	Michael Andretti
183	Johnny Rutherford
184–195	Michael Andretti
196–250	Johnny Rutherford

Cautions: 10 for 80 laps
Laps	Reason
3–7	Steve Chassey crash turn 2
14–21	Rain
48–62	Roberto Guerrero crash turn 3
71–78	Mario Andretti crash turn 3
100–109	Randy Lanier crash turns 3-4
111–116	Tom Sneva crash turn 2
128–135	Johnny Parsons crash turn 2
186–193	Rick Mears engine
195–202	Michael Andretti engine
243–246	Geoff Brabham and Al Unser Jr. crash turn 2

== Broadcasting ==
For the first time, NBC chose to televise the race on a tape-delayed format eight days after the event on Sunday, August 10. CART's decision to postpone the 1985 Michigan 500 cost NBC a reported $400,000 and the network was reluctant to broadcast a live 500-mile event again.

Paul Page was the lead announcer and was joined by Bobby Unser as color commentator. Gary Gerould and Bruce Jenner served as pit reporters.
