= Jim Trueman =

American racing driver (1935–1986)

Trueman during practice at the 1986 Indy 500

James R. Trueman (May 25, 1935 – June 11, 1986) was an American businessman and automobile racing team owner. His most successful business ventures were Red Roof Inn motels and the Truesports racing team. Bobby Rahal won the 1986 Indianapolis 500 for the team. Eleven days after the victory, Trueman succumbed to colon cancer and died at the age of 51.

== Business ==
One of Trueman's first business interests was Deibel's, a German-style restaurant in Columbus, Ohio. In 1972, Trueman opened his first Red Roof Inn motel. Soon he had three. The business was very successful, and by 1986, there were at least 155 motels in the chain.

== Mid-Ohio ==
On October 1, 1981, Trueman purchased Mid-Ohio Sports Car Course, a race track near Lexington, Ohio. Immediately he began improving the facility.

The track welcomed the CART series back in 1983. The facility became one of the most popular road racing tracks in the United States, hosting also IMSA, Grand-Am, IROC, SCCA, motorcycle racing, vintage events, and various other races.

== Auto racing ==
Trueman began driving sports cars in 1962. He entered the Can-Am series and drove through the 1970s. He won 125 races in 23 years. He was the SCCA national champion in 1975 and 1978.

== Team owner ==
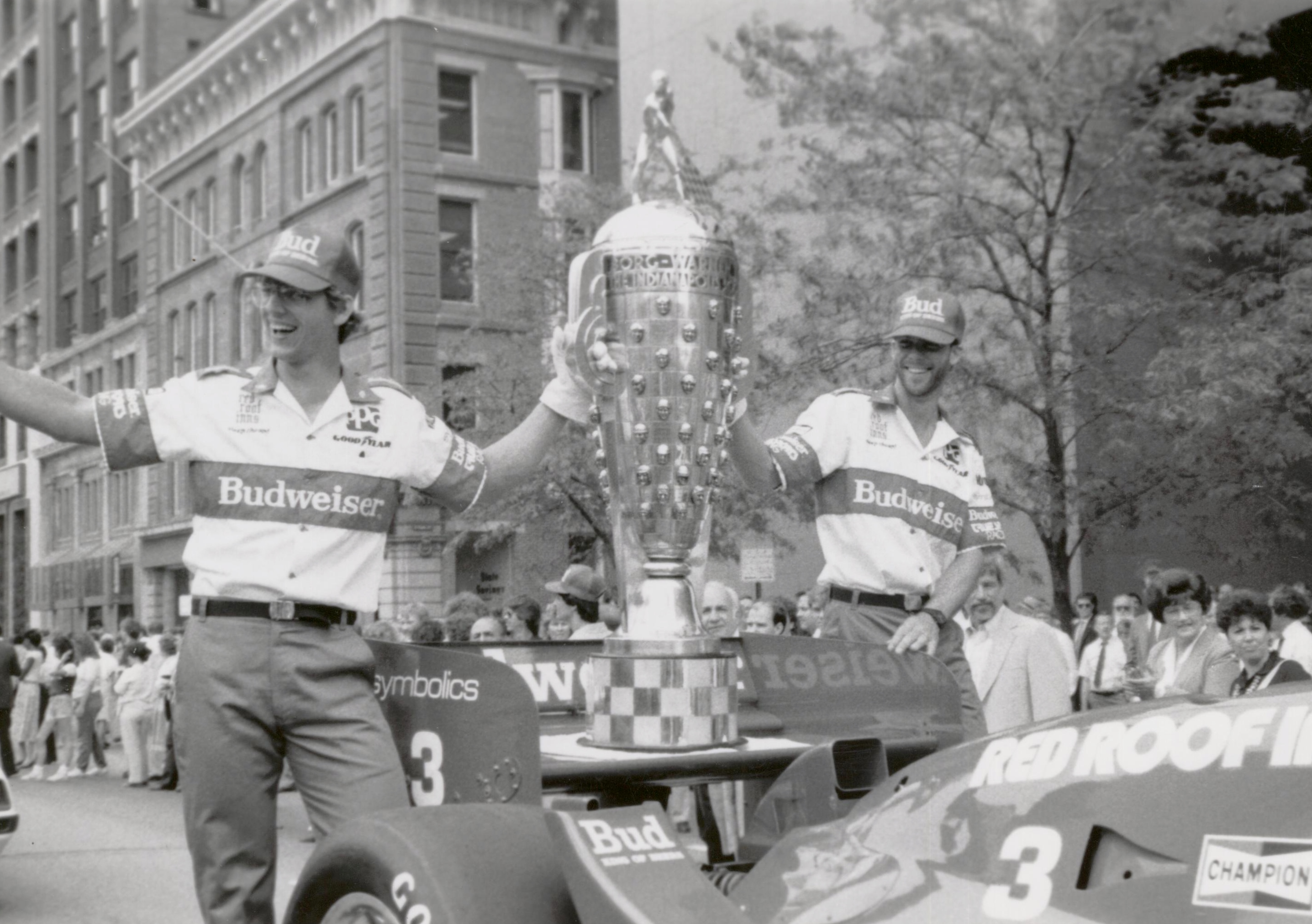
Truesports victory parade in Columbus, Ohio. Trueman was too ill to attend.

Trueman used his riches from the motel business to expand his auto racing interests. He signed on Red Roof Inns to sponsor Vern Schuppan in the 1981 Indianapolis 500. Schuppan finished a strong third. In 1982, Trueman switched from Can-Am to CART and experienced instant success.

In 1985, Trueman was diagnosed with cancer. He kept his illness secret for many months. At the 1986 Indianapolis 500, Trueman spent the entire month of May at the track, but was visibly frail and quiet. The race was originally scheduled on his 51st birthday, but rain delayed the race. Bobby Rahal's car was fitted with a "Happy Birthday JRT" decal to celebrate. The following Saturday, May 31, 1986, the race was finally run. With two laps to go, Rahal passed Kevin Cogan on a restart, and held on to win. The emotional Rahal nearly broke down in victory lane.

In victory lane, Trueman stood up and took the traditional milk for winning Indy. Several years later, ABC television reporter Jack Arute revealed that Trueman whispered in his ear "I can go now."

On Thursday June 5, 1986, five days after the victory, the city of Columbus held a victory parade downtown. Trueman was too sick to attend. Six days later, he died.

== Personal ==
Trueman was married to his wife Barbara, with whom he had three children. He attended Ohio State University where he became a Sigma Chi and also served in the military. His philanthropic efforts included the James R. Trueman Fitness Center at Wheeling Jesuit University.

The rookie of the year award in CART was named in his honor.

Trueman's grandson Austin Cindric is a driver in NASCAR. Austin is the son of Jim's daughter Megan. Austin was born twelve years after his grandfather died. Trueman's son-in-law is former Team Penske president and racing strategist Tim Cindric.

== Racing record ==
=== SCCA National Championship Runoffs ===
Year	Track	Car	Engine	Class	Finish	Start	Status
1967	Daytona	Lotus		C Production	7	8	Running
1972	Road Atlanta	Bobsy	Harrell	C Sports Racer	11	1	Retired
1973	Road Atlanta	Bobsy SR5	Ford	C Sports Racer	2	2	Running
1974	Road Atlanta	Bobsy SR6	Ford	C Sports Racer	15	2	Retired
1975	Road Atlanta	Bobsy SR6	Ford	C Sports Racer	1	2	Running
1977	Road Atlanta	March	Ford	Formula C	3	2	Running
1978	Road Atlanta	March	Ford	Formula C	1	2	Running
1978	Road Atlanta	Chevron	Ford	B Sports Racer	2	2	Running
1979	Road Atlanta	Ralt	Cosworth	Formula Atlantic	9	14	Running
