= 1986 Indianapolis 500 =

American motor race

70th Indianapolis 500

Indianapolis Motor Speedway

Indianapolis 500
- Sanctioning body: USAC
- Season: 1986 CART season 1985-86 Gold Crown
- Date: May 31, 1986
- Winner: (United States) Bobby Rahal
- Winning team: Truesports
- Winning Chief Mechanic: Steve Horne
- Time of race: 2:55:43.480
- Average speed: 170.722 mph (274.750 km/h)
- Pole position: (United States) Rick Mears
- Pole speed: 216.828 mph (348.951 km/h)
- Fastest qualifier: (United States) Rick Mears
- Rookie of the Year: (United States) Randy Lanier
- Most laps led: (United States) Rick Mears (76)

Pre-race ceremonies
- National anthem: David Hasselhoff
- "Back Home Again in Indiana": John Davies
- Starting command: Mary F. Hulman; Tony George (restart)
- Pace car: Chevrolet Corvette
- Pace car driver: Chuck Yeager
- Starter: Duane Sweeney
- Estimated attendance: 400,000 (Sun.); 5,800 (Mon.); 325,000 (Sat.)

Television in the United States
- Network: ABC
- Announcers: Jim Lampley, Sam Posey
- Nielsen ratings: 8.8 / 31

Chronology
Previous	Next
1985	1987

The 70th Indianapolis 500 was held at the Indianapolis Motor Speedway in Speedway, Indiana on Saturday, May 31, 1986. After being rained out on May 25–26, the race was rescheduled for the following weekend. Bobby Rahal was the winner, becoming the first driver in Indy history to complete the 500 miles (800 km) in less than three hours. At an average speed of 170.722 mph (274.750 km/h), it was the fastest 500-mile Indy car race to that point. It was the first of three Indy victories for Rahal, one as a driver (1986) and two as a car owner (2004, 2020).

Nearly the entire race unfolded as a three-way battle between polesitter Rick Mears, Bobby Rahal, and Kevin Cogan. Cogan, who was a key fixture in the controversial crash on the opening lap of the 1982 race, took the lead in dramatic fashion with 13 laps to go. Cogan, driving for Patrick Racing, then pulled out to a commanding lead; he appeared to be on his way to victory, and to career redemption. But on lap 194, his lead evaporated when a spin by Arie Luyendyk brought out the caution flag. After a quick cleanup, the green flag came back out with two laps to go. Second place Bobby Rahal got the jump on the restart and grabbed the lead. Rahal pulled away and won the race, with car owner Jim Trueman, stricken with cancer, cheering him on in the pit area. Trueman died eleven days after the victory. Polesitter Rick Mears, who led the most laps during the race, came home third. At the time, it was the closest three-car finish in Indy history.

The race was sanctioned by USAC, and was included as part of the 1986 CART PPG Indy Car World Series. For the first time, ABC Sports televised the race live "flag-to-flag" on network television in the United States. The race celebrated the 75th anniversary of the first 500, but there was very little fanfare of the milestone outside of the cover art of the official program.

== Background ==
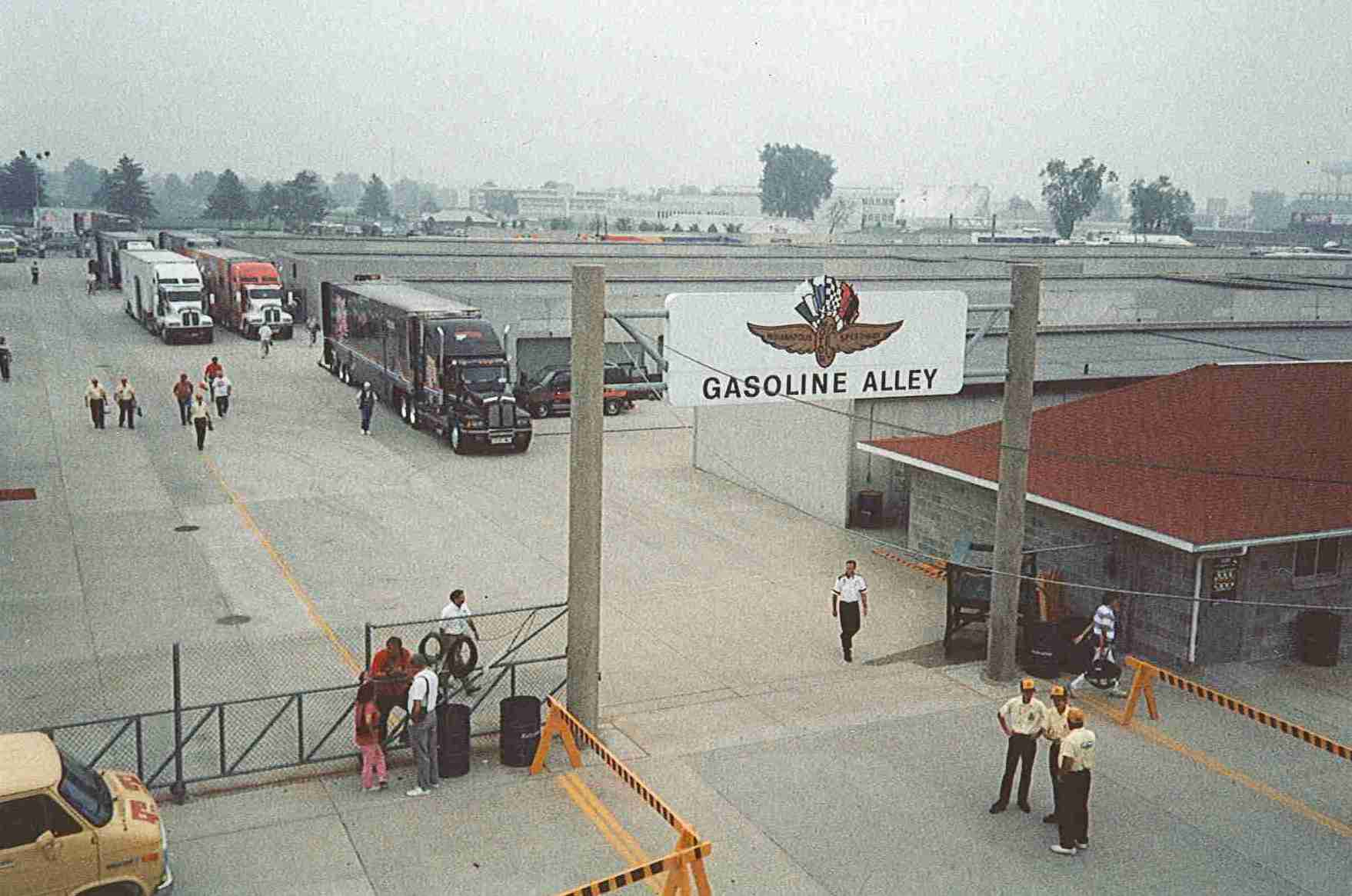
The new Gasoline Alley garage area at the Indianapolis Motor Speedway

=== Garage area ===
The highlight of offseason improvements at the Indianapolis Motor Speedway was the construction of a new, state of the art garage area. Just days after the 1985 race, the old Gasoline Alley garage area, most of which had stood since the 1940s, was dismantled and demolished. Official groundbreaking for the new facility occurred on August 26, 1985. The new concrete garages increased to 96 units (up from 88), and each stall provided approximately 30% more working room than their predecessors. The green and white wooden barn doors were replaced with overhead steel garage doors, and the layout was changed from east–west to north–south. The access lanes were widened substantially, improving ingress and egress, improving drainage, and various vendor and support units were also part of the new complex. Lastly, a refueling complex was constructed in the southeast corner, including two underground tanks, one each for methanol and gasoline fuels. Most of the work was completed in April, however, some of the finishing touches were still being completed during the first week of on-track activity.

Though the new garages were universally praised for their increased space and function, they were criticized for lack of aesthetics, and for breaking tradition. The plain precast concrete walls resembled the cookie-cutter stadiums of the era that were largely criticized in baseball and football. The design was a sharp and striking contrast to the previous garage complex, which led some to call them overtly plain or "antiseptic." Changing the layout to north–south based was also a thinly veiled attempt by the management to further scale back the oft-rowdy "Snakepit" area formerly located inside the turn one infield. The interiors were spacious and without walls (except those adjacent to the middle corridors), allowing teams the flexibility to erect partitions as they saw fit, as well as layout their work area however they desired. Lastly, the new complex greatly improved safety. The old wooden buildings were criticized as potential "fire traps," and management did not want a repeat of the devastating 1941 fire. The concrete construction was more fire-resistant, water spigots were provided in every stall, and the wider lanes provided easier fire escape.

=== Victory lane ===
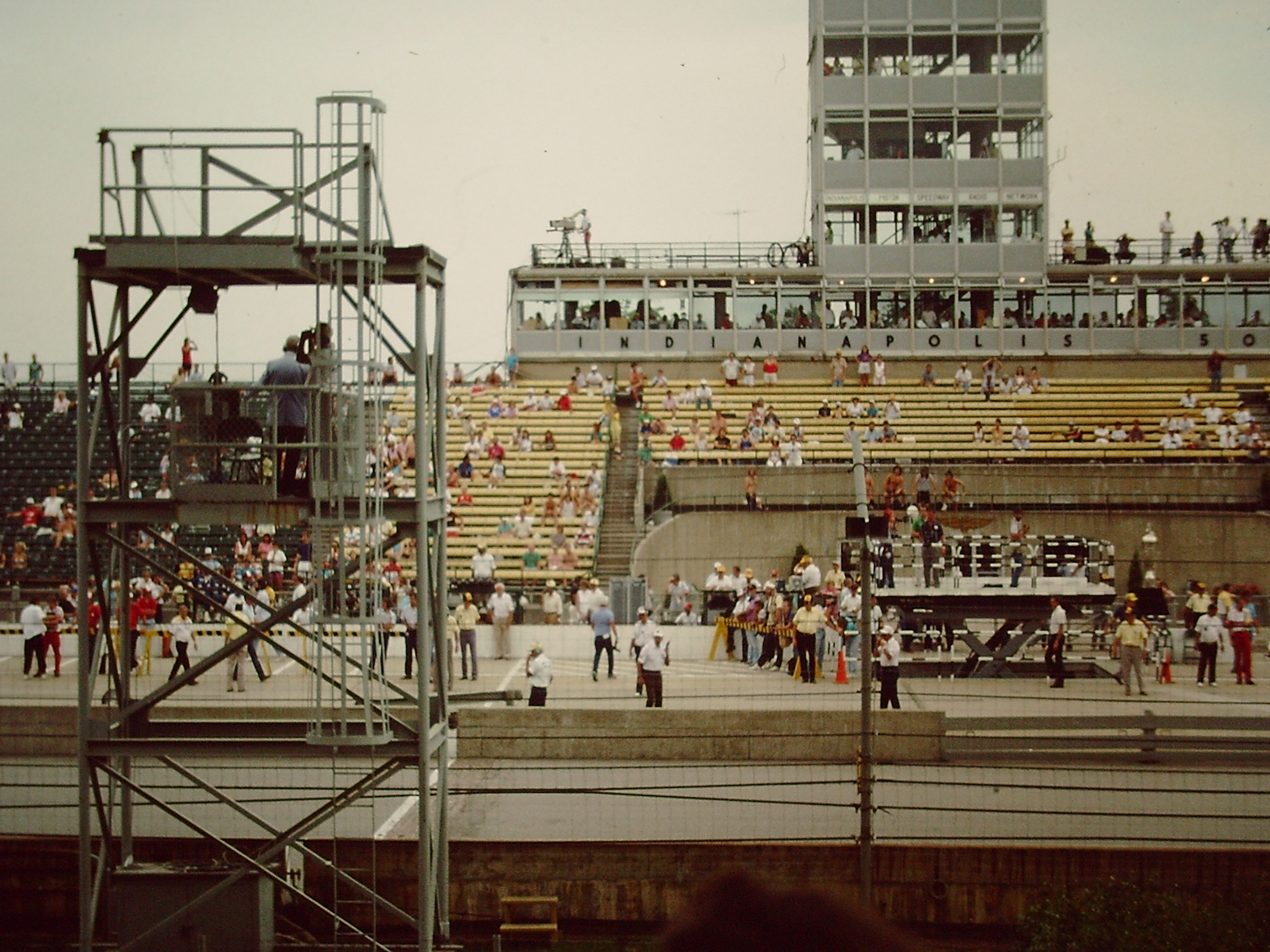
The new victory lane, visible in 1988.

A new victory lane area was constructed for the 1986 race. From 1971 to 1985, the winner drove up the checkerboard ramps into the "horseshoe" area below the Master Control Tower. A hydraulic platform was now used, which was located in the actual pit area, in line with the pit stalls. The car would drive onto the platform, and it would raise into the air, and then slowly spin 360° for the fans to see the winner.

This victory lane was popular, but could only hold a small number of people when raised. It would be used through 1993.

=== Television ===
On August 19, 1985, after 15 years of being shown tape delayed, ABC Sports signed an initial three-year deal to cover the Indianapolis 500 live flag-to-flag starting in 1986. Longtime anchor Jim McKay was moved to the host position, and play-by-play would be handled by Jim Lampley and Sam Posey.

The Daytona 500 had been shown live flag-to-flag on CBS since 1979, and NBC carried the Michigan 500 live beginning in 1981. ABC officials had wanted to do the same for Indianapolis for several years. ABC's landmark telecast was scheduled to feature 32 cameras, three RaceCams, and an hour-long live pre-race.

=== Team and driver changes ===
Defending Indy 500 winner Danny Sullivan returned to Penske Racing, however, the rest of the team saw a shake-up from the previous year. Rick Mears suffered a serious crash at Sanair in 1984. In 1985, Mears only drove a partial schedule (ovals only, including Indy). For the 1985 season, Al Unser Sr. drove full-time, as a substitute for Mears. Unser won the 1985 CART championship in dramatic fashion. At the final race of the season at Tamiami Park, Unser Sr. clinched the championship by 1 point over his son Al Unser Jr. For 1986, however, Unser Sr. dropped down to a part-time schedule only. Unser would race the three 500-mile races (Indy, Michigan, and Pocono), along with Phoenix and Tamiami. Unser was assigned the duty of rolling out the brand new PC-15/Ilmor-Chevy Indy V-8.

Kevin Cogan moved over from the Kraco Team to Patrick Racing. Cogan joined Emerson Fittipaldi to expand the team to a two-car effort. Fittipaldi's new livery for 1986 featured a sponsor returning to the sport after a lengthy absence. Marlboro, which had abruptly left the sport of Indy car racing in 1971, returned and would become a major part of the series for 25 years.

Bobby Rahal won three of the last six races of 1985, and finished third in the points standings. Despite a heavy crash at Michigan in August, and a testing crash in the fall at Indy, Rahal was hot off the finish of the 1985 season, returning with Truesports, and a favorite entering the season.

=== Borg-Warner Trophy ===
For the month of May 1986, the Borg-Warner Trophy celebrated its 50th anniversary sporting a new look, featuring a brand new three-row base. The likeness of the 1986 race winner was going to fill the body of the trophy, and the new base was constructed in order to accommodate winners through 2003. On the base, the first square was filled with a gold likeness of the late Speedway president Tony Hulman. The base increased the height of the trophy to 55 inches, and the weight to about 95 pounds.

== Race schedule ==
Race schedule — April/May 1986
Sun	Mon	Tue	Wed	Thu	Fri	Sat
20	21	22	23	24	25; ROP	26; ROP
27; ROP	28	29	30	1	2	3 Practice
4 Practice	5 Practice	6 Practice	7 Practice	8 Practice	9 Practice	10; Pole Day
11; Time Trials	12; Practice	13; Practice	14; Practice	15; Practice	16; Practice	17; Time Trials
18; Bump Day	19	20	21	22; Carb Day	23; Mini-Marathon	24; Parade
25; Indy 500	26; Indy 500	27	28	29	30; Practice	31; Indy 500

Color	Notes
Green	Practice
Dark Blue	Time trials
Silver	Race day
Red	Rained out*
Blank	No track activity

* Includes days where track
activity was significantly
limited due to rain

ROP — denotes Rookie
Orientation Program

== Practice - Week 1 ==
Jim Trueman during practice.

Practice started on Opening Day, Saturday, May 3. Chip Ganassi earned the honor of first car on the track. Michael and Mario Andretti led the speed chart for the day, both over 210 mph (340 km/h). On the second day of practice, the Andrettis continued their dominance, again posting the top two speeds.

On Tuesday, May 6, three single car crashes marked the first incidents of the month. Danny Ongais, Herm Johnson, and Johnny Parsons all suffered single-car crashes in Turn 1, with Johnson's the most serious. Around 3:30 p.m., a piece of bodywork flew off Johnson's car in Turn 1, which caused him to break into a hard spin. His car hit nearly head on into the retaining wall, and he suffered serious fractures to his feet and back.

Penske teammates Rick Mears and Danny Sullivan nudged the speeds up over 214 mph (344 km/h) by Wednesday, May 7, then the day ended early due to a rain shower. On Thursday, May 8, Emerson Fittipaldi joined them as the third driver over 214 mph (344 km/h).

By Friday, May 9, the last practice session before pole day, seven drivers were over 214 mph (344 km/h), with Mears still the fastest of the month at 214.694 mph (345.517 km/h). The only incident of the day was a suspension failure and spin by Johnny Rutherford, but no wall contact resulted.

== Time Trials - First weekend ==
=== Pole Day - Saturday May 10 ===
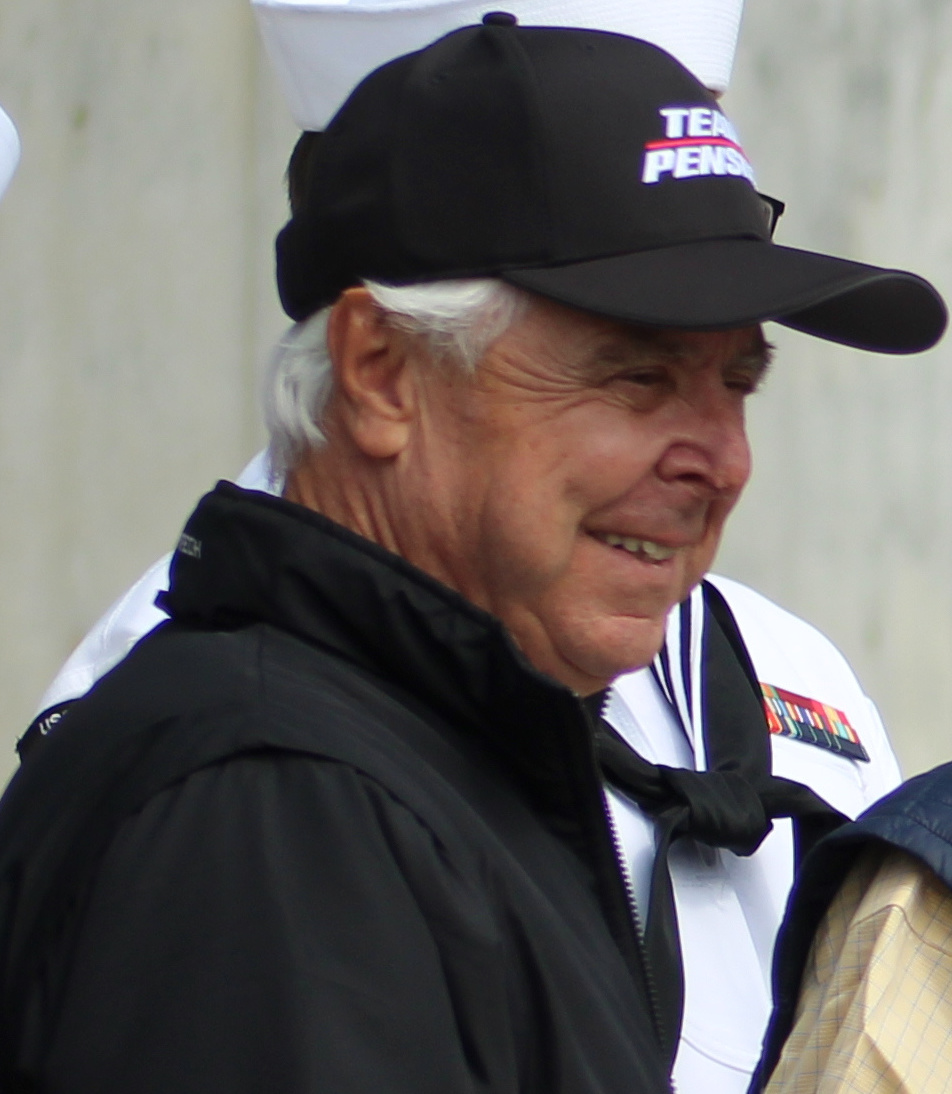
Rick Mears won the pole position.

During the morning practice on Saturday, May 10, Rick Mears set an all-time unofficial track record, at 217.548 mph (350.110 km/h). Later in the session, Michael Andretti and Bobby Rahal both broke the 216 mph (348 km/h) barrier. No incidents were reported.

Mario Andretti took the honor of first-in-the-field, with a qualifying run of 212.300 mph (341.664 km/h). Three cars later, defending Indy winner Danny Sullivan took the provisional pole with a new track record of 215.382 mph (346.624 km/h). Sullivan's speed did not hold up long, however. About an hour later, Rick Mears blistered the track with a new track record.

- Lap 1 – 41.364 seconds, 217.581 mph (new 1-lap track record)
- Lap 2 – 41.451 seconds, 217.124 mph
- Lap 3 – 41.503 seconds, 216.852 mph
- Lap 4 – 41.712 seconds, 215.765 mph
- Total – 2:46.030, 216.828 mph (new 4-lap track record)

Mears secured his third Indy pole position, and the Penske teammates would line up 1st–2nd. The one-lap and four-lap track records set by Mears would stand for two years. Michael Andretti squeezed himself onto the front row, with a run of 214.522 mph (345.240 km/h), faster than his father Mario. It would be Michael's only front row start at Indy. Emerson Fittipaldi ran two laps over 213 mph (343 km/h), but a flat tire slowed his average to just over 210 mph (340 km/h). Bobby Rahal managed one lap over 214 mph (344 km/h), and qualified 4th.

With about ten minutes left in the session, A. J. Foyt lined up to make an attempt, but his car failed technical inspection, and he was sidelined for the day. Geoff Brabham got out just before the 6 o'clock gun, and completed his run at 207.082 mph. Brabham was slowest car of the day, but ultimately he would hang on to make the field. After qualifying was concluded for the day, the cars of Raul Boesel and Dick Simon, both of the same team, were disqualified for a faulty pop-off valve fitting.

=== Second day - Sunday May 11 ===
After missing out on a qualifying attempt on pole day, A. J. Foyt took to the track to qualify for his 29th career Indy 500. He posted the 5th fastest speed overall in the field, but since he was a second day qualifier, he lined up deep in the field.

Raul Boesel re-qualified his machine, after being disqualified a day earlier. At the close of the day, the field was filled to 28 cars.

== Practice – Week 2 ==
Rain delayed the opening of practice on Monday, May 12, and only 21 cars took laps Tuesday (May 13). Two-time winner Gordon Johncock planned to end a one-year retirement, and purchase a back-up car from Penske. However his funding fell through at the last minute, and he was forced to sit out the race.

The biggest story of the week came on Tuesday May 14. Mario Andretti was practicing his already qualified car. A suspension piece failed, and he crashed hard into the turn 3 wall. Andretti suffered lacerations to his left heel, and abrasions to both knees, but he was not seriously injured. Newman/Haas Racing would spend the next several days trying to make repairs, and even sent the car's tub back to the Lola factory in England for reconstruction. Andretti's 5th-place starting position was in jeopardy if they were unable to rebuild the car. Two days later, Andretti was cleared to drive, and he soon started shaking down his back-up car. By the end of the week, the team announced that Andretti would drive the back-up car in the race. He was moved to the rear of the starting grid.

The remainder of the week saw sparse track activity. Most cars on the track belonged to yet-unqualified drivers. Thursday, May 15 was almost a complete wash out due to a thunderstorm.

== Time Trials - Second weekend ==
=== Third Day - Saturday May 17 ===
Despite threatening weather for the next two days, the third day of qualifying saw only four additional cars added to the field. Jim Crawford was the fastest of the day, over 209 mph (336 km/h). Dick Simon, who was disqualified the previous weekend, put his car back into the field with a speed of 204.978 mph (329.880 km/h).

The day ended with one position left vacant in the field.

=== Bump Day - Sunday May 18 ===
As many as twelve cars started the day with hopes to make the field on the final day of time trials. Rain kept the track closed until 3 p.m., with qualifying finally getting underway at 4 p.m. By late afternoon, however, several cars were pulled out of line and chose not to make an attempt.

George Snider went out first in an Foyt back-up car, and filled the field to 33 cars. That placed Dick Simon on the bubble as the slowest car in the field. After a wave-off by Steve Chassey, Gary Bettenhausen took to the track. Bettenhausen bumped his way into the field with ease.

With Geoff Brabham on the bubble, and rain quickly approaching, Rick Miaskiewicz was the next car out. His first two laps were not nearly fast enough, and his team waved him off. That gave Derek Daly just enough time to get out on the track. His first two laps were fast enough to bump Brabham, but as he was completing his second lap, the skies poured rain, and the run was halted.

Geoff Brabham held on as the slowest car in the field, while Dick Simon, the only car bumped, stood as the first alternate. Qualifying for the day lasted less than 45 minutes.

== Carburetion Day ==
On Thursday, May 22, the final scheduled practice session was held. All 33 qualified cars except Phil Krueger took practice laps. First alternate Dick Simon also took laps. Krueger's crew discovered a water leak and elected to stay in the garage to rebuild the engine. At 11:43 a.m., a major crash occurred. A brake rotor on Dennis Firestone's car exploded, blowing his left rear tire. He spun wildly out of turn four. Roberto Moreno was following closely behind, and veered to the inside in attempt to avoid the crash. Both cars spun into the inside wall, and Firestone slammed into the pit-entrance barrier, splitting the car in half. Moreno tagged the inside wall, and continued to spin through the pits, running into the back of George Snider's car, then crashing into the parked car of Josele Garza. Snider was pushed into the grass strip dividing the track from the pit lane, and hit that backside of that wall. Garza's teammate Johnny Parsons avoided the incident only because his crew had just dispatched him out of the pits seconds earlier.

None of the drivers were seriously injured, however, Firestone's car was destroyed, and the team had no back-up car. Two pit crew members were treated for minor injuries, as well as one spectator. The following day, Firestone's car was formally withdrawn from the starting field. Josele Garza's car was able to be repaired. George Snider and Roberto Moreno announced they would be driving back-up cars in the race. Both of those cars were moved to the back of the grid joining Mario Andretti. After Firestone withdrew, the first alternate Dick Simon was elevated to starting field, and took the 33rd starting position.

Rick Mears led the speed chart for the afternoon, with a hand-timed lap of 212.7 mph (342.3 km/h).

=== Pit Stop Contest ===
The semifinals and finals for the 10th annual Miller Pit Stop Contest were held on Thursday May 22. The top three race qualifiers and their respective pit crews were automatically eligible: Rick Mears, Danny Sullivan, and Michael Andretti. However, Mears declined the invitation. Bobby Rahal (who qualified 4th) took that empty spot. On Friday May 16, pit stop contest preliminaries were held to fill the fourth and final spot. Emerson Fittipaldi was the fastest and advanced to the semifinals.

Two semifinal matches were held. The fastest two teams (measured by elapsed time) would advance to the final round, regardless of the respective head-to-head results. Teams were required to change two tires and simulate a fuel coupling. In the first semifinal, Danny Sullivan clocked in at 12.253 seconds, and Bobby Rahal finished in 13.206 seconds. In the second semifinal round, Emerson Fittipaldi faced Michael Andretti. Sullivan and Rahal advanced to the finals. For the final round, teams were required to change all four tires and again simulate a fuel coupling. Danny Sullivan (Penske Racing) led by chief mechanic Chuck Sprague, defeated Bobby Rahal (Truesports) led by Steve Horne. Sullivan won the event for the second year in a row, and it was Penske's fifth win overall in the event.

Semifinals
1	Danny Sullivan (Penske Racing)	12.253
3	Bobby Rahal (Truesports)	13.206
20	Emerson Fittipaldi (Patrick Racing)	14.456
18	Michael Andretti (Kraco Enterprises)	15.292

Finals
1	Danny Sullivan (Penske Racing)	20.288
3	Bobby Rahal (Truesports)	22.734

== Starting grid ==
Row	Inside		Middle		Outside	
1	4	(United States) Rick Mears W	1	(United States) Danny Sullivan W	18	(United States) Michael Andretti
2	3	(United States) Bobby Rahal	11	(United States) Al Unser W	7	(United States) Kevin Cogan
3	33	(United States) Tom Sneva W	5	(Colombia) Roberto Guerrero	30	(United States) Al Unser Jr.
4	66	(United States) Ed Pimm	20	(Brazil) Emerson Fittipaldi	21	(United States) Johnny Rutherford W
5	12	(United States) Randy Lanier R	15	(United States) Pancho Carter	81	(Canada) Jacques Villeneuve R
6	25	(United States) Danny Ongais	55	(Mexico) Josele Garza	16	(United States) Tony Bettenhausen Jr.
7	61	(Netherlands) Arie Luyendyk	8	(Australia) Geoff Brabham	14	(United States) A. J. Foyt W
8	22	(Brazil) Raul Boesel	71	(United States) Scott Brayton	42	(United States) Phil Krueger R
9	59	(United States) Chip Ganassi	31	(United Kingdom) Jim Crawford	6	(United States) Rich Vogler
10	95	(United States) Johnny Parsons	24	(United States) Gary Bettenhausen	2	(United States) Mario Andretti W
11	84	(United States) George Snider	9	(Brazil) Roberto Moreno R	23	(United States) Dick Simon

Mario Andretti qualified 5th on pole day. A few days later, he crashed his already-qualified car, and it was damaged beyond repair. The car was replaced with a back-up car, and was moved the rear of the field.

George Snider and Roberto Moreno were both involved in the multi-car crash on Carburetion Day. Both primary cars were damaged beyond repair. Their cars were replaced with back-up cars, and moved to the rear of the field.

After Dennis Firestone withdrew his wrecked car, Dick Simon was added to field in the 33rd position as the first alternate

=== Qualified cars withdrawn ===
- Dennis Firestone (#36); wrecked on Carburetion Day and withdrawn.

=== Alternates ===
- First alternate: Dick Simon (#23) – Bumped – Named to starting field on 5/23
- Second alternate: none

=== Failed to qualify ===
- Derek Daly (#28) – Incomplete qualifying run due to rain
- Rick Miaskiewicz R (#19) – Waved off
- Steve Chassey (#56/#65) – Waved off
- Steve Bren R (#25)
- Spike Gehlhausen (#10)
- Rupert Keegan R (#56/#65) – Did not make an attempt
- Jan Lammers R (#98) – Did not make an attempt
- Herm Johnson (#28) – Wrecked in practice, injured
- Mike Nish R (#44/#45)
- John Paul Jr. (#31) Paul withdrew after a few days of practice after being sentenced to prison for his involvement in drug trafficking with his father, John Paul, Sr.

== Rain delay ==
=== Sunday, May 25 ===
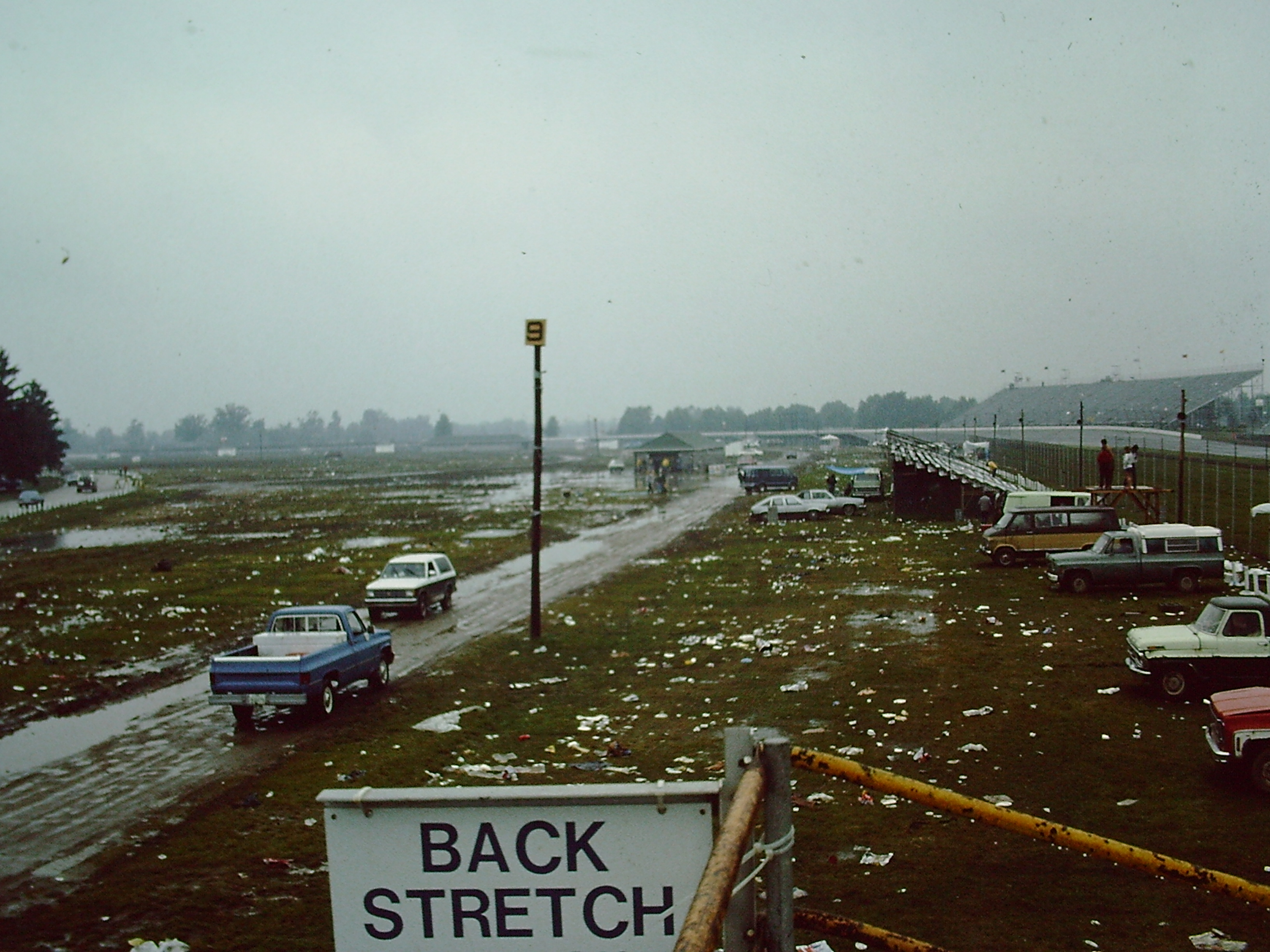
After two days of rain, the Speedway infield became a quagmire of mud and garbage.

The race was scheduled for Sunday, May 25. Despite a forecast of only a 15% chance of precipitation, race morning saw overcast skies and steady rain. Track drying efforts began around 10:45 a.m. EST. The track was close to dry, and spectators began filing into their seats. The cars were then wheeled to the pits, in preparations for a start. At 1:15 p.m., however, the rain resumed, and threatened to wash out the entire day. The rain stopped, and track drying efforts started a second time. The rain returned once more, and at 3:35 p.m., officials rescheduled the race for Monday. During the delay, ABC-TV diverted its programming for several minutes in favor of live coverage of Hands Across America.

Grim memories of the tragic 1973 race were still in many people's minds, and all involved were determined to make certain the race would not be hastily put on in a rushed, last-minute, fashion. In addition, officials were uncommitted on how late they would permit a start, and if they would aim for a 101-lap race (the minimum distance for the event to be official), or insist on adequate time for a full 200-lap race before sunset. The weather forecast for Monday (80% chance of rain) was yet another concern.

=== Monday, May 26 ===
On Monday, May 26, there was no chance to hold the race, as it rained all day. The infield turned into a sea of mud, and most of the spectators had since departed, going home to their jobs. Authorities estimated Monday's attendance at a paltry 5,800 spectators. Those who did arrive merely milled around, as most of the infield was impassable, concession stands were out of food, and souvenir tents were empty and abandoned. Some visited the Speedway museum.

At 3:20 p.m., officials announced that the race was going to be postponed, but did not yet announce the date or time to which it would be rescheduled. Unsubstantiated rumors even circulated about canceling the race outright. ABC television was scheduled to cover the race live for the first time, but did not commit to live coverage on Tuesday. Track officials were faced with the possibility of running the race on Tuesday in front of empty grandstands, and without live TV coverage. Weather forecasts for Tuesday and Wednesday were not promising, a substantial amount of the track staff was unavailable, and the sloppy conditions made parts of the facility impassable. Around 6 p.m. on Monday evening, a deal had been struck to reschedule the race for Saturday, May 31.

=== Mid-week ===
During the week, teams spent time resting and relaxing, while others prepared for the next race at Milwaukee. Track crews worked diligently to clean up the infield, and make it passable for Saturday. As a result of the postponement, a special thirty-minute practice session was arranged on Friday, May 30. Participants were held to a 120 mph (190 km/h) speed limit, and it served mostly as a leak check exercise. Some drivers, including polesitter Rick Mears, as well as Bobby Rahal, did not even participate. The five-day delay wound up being a popular choice by nearly all of the participants. It allowed them to rest and unwind, and regroup for race day without the uncertainty that was looming over them of when the race would start.

For the weekend, the Rex Mays 200 at Milwaukee, originally scheduled for Sunday June 1, was pushed back one week to accommodate the Indy rain delay. The 1986 race marked the first time since 1973 that the race was pushed to another day, and the first time since 1915 that 'not a single wheel had turned' all weekend because of rain. It also marked the first time since 1967 the race was held May 31; until 1971, when the race was always held on May 30, if that day was a Sunday, it was held the ensuing Monday, May 31. As of 2021, it is the most recent "500" to be held on May 31, and is the longest postponement in Indy from scheduled race day by weather in history. (The 2020 was postponed 12 weeks by restrictions from a global pandemic, but there were no weather-related postponements.)

== Race summary ==
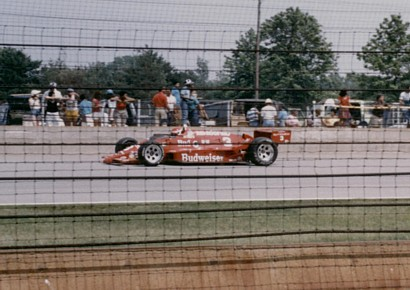
Bobby Rahal during the race

=== Pre-race and aborted start ===
Saturday, May 31 saw sunny skies and temperatures in the low 80s. Traditional pre-race ceremonies were retooled slightly, with some replacement performers. The Purdue band was absent, while Robert McFarland, scheduled to sing "Back Home Again in Indiana", had departed and was replaced by John S. Davies, the artist-in-residence at the Indianapolis Opera. A smaller balloon spectacle was also hastily arranged, after all of the original balloons had lost their helium by Monday afternoon. An army band from Fort Benjamin Harrison was brought in to accompany the performances, and to perform "Taps." Mary F. Hulman gave the starting command just minutes before 11 a.m., and the field pulled away for the parade and pace laps.

On the final pace lap, Tom Sneva veered off-course at the exit of turn 2. Further down the backstretch, a massive smoke bomb was set off by some unruly spectators. The yellow flag was displayed, and the start was waved off. The next time by, the field was red-flagged, and halted on the frontstretch. Sneva's crash was cleaned up, however he was out of the race before it began, and it was determined that the field had burned an unnecessary four laps of fuel. A decision was made to replenish each of the 32 remaining cars' pitside fuel tanks with 3 gallons of methanol. The red flag wound up delaying the start by over a half-hour.

=== Start ===
At 11:34 a.m., Tony George gave the command to restart the engines, and the field assembled for two pace laps. The field was straggling through the fourth turn to take the green, and Michael Andretti jumped into the lead from the outside of the front row. He set a new all-time record for the first lap at 202.940 mph (326.600 km/h), the first time the opening lap was run over 200 mph (320 km/h). After a postponement of six days, and after another half hour delay due to the Sneva crash, the race was finally underway.

=== First half ===
After charging from the 30th starting position, Mario Andretti's day was short-lived. On the 15th lap, he brought out the yellow when he stalled in turn three with an ignition problem. Michael Andretti set the early pace, leading the first 42 laps. Mario later returned to the track, but his car lasted only four additional laps, and he finished 32nd.

The first half of the race saw record average speed, with only two yellows for 10 laps, and no major incidents. The second yellow on lap 52 came out for debris when Michael Andretti lost a mirror. Rick Mears came to the lead by lap 49, and held it until the next round of pit stops. On lap 83, Bobby Rahal took the lead for 19 laps, and led at the halfway point.

=== Second half ===
Johnny Parsons spun out of turn two on lap 102, and came to a stop along the inside wall. The car suffered minor damage, and Parsons was uninjured. After another long stretch of green, Rich Vogler crashed in turn three on lap 135.

On the 135th lap, Rahal (1st) and Cogan (2nd) pitted under caution. Rahal's crew nearly made a critical error, and did not change the left-front tire (it had not been changed yet in the race). Rahal had to pit once again the next time around to correct the oversight. Since the field was under caution, the consequences were not quite as serious, but he still fell from 1st to 4th.

On the restart, Rick Mears resumed as the leader. Short-pitting due to poor handling, 4th place Michael Andretti was the first of the leaders to pit again (on lap 163). Mears led all the way until his final scheduled pit stop on lap 165. Moments later Roberto Moreno brought out the caution by stalling in turn four. After Rahal and Cogan cycled through their final planned stops on lap 166, Mears again found himself up front. Michael Andretti (at the tail-end of the lead lap in 4th place) actually led the field behind the pace car as the field went back to green with 31 laps to go. Observers noted that the three leaders would have to complete the final 34 laps on one tank of fuel. Without another caution, it was feared that they might need a splash-and-go stop for fuel in order to make it to the finish.

=== Finish ===
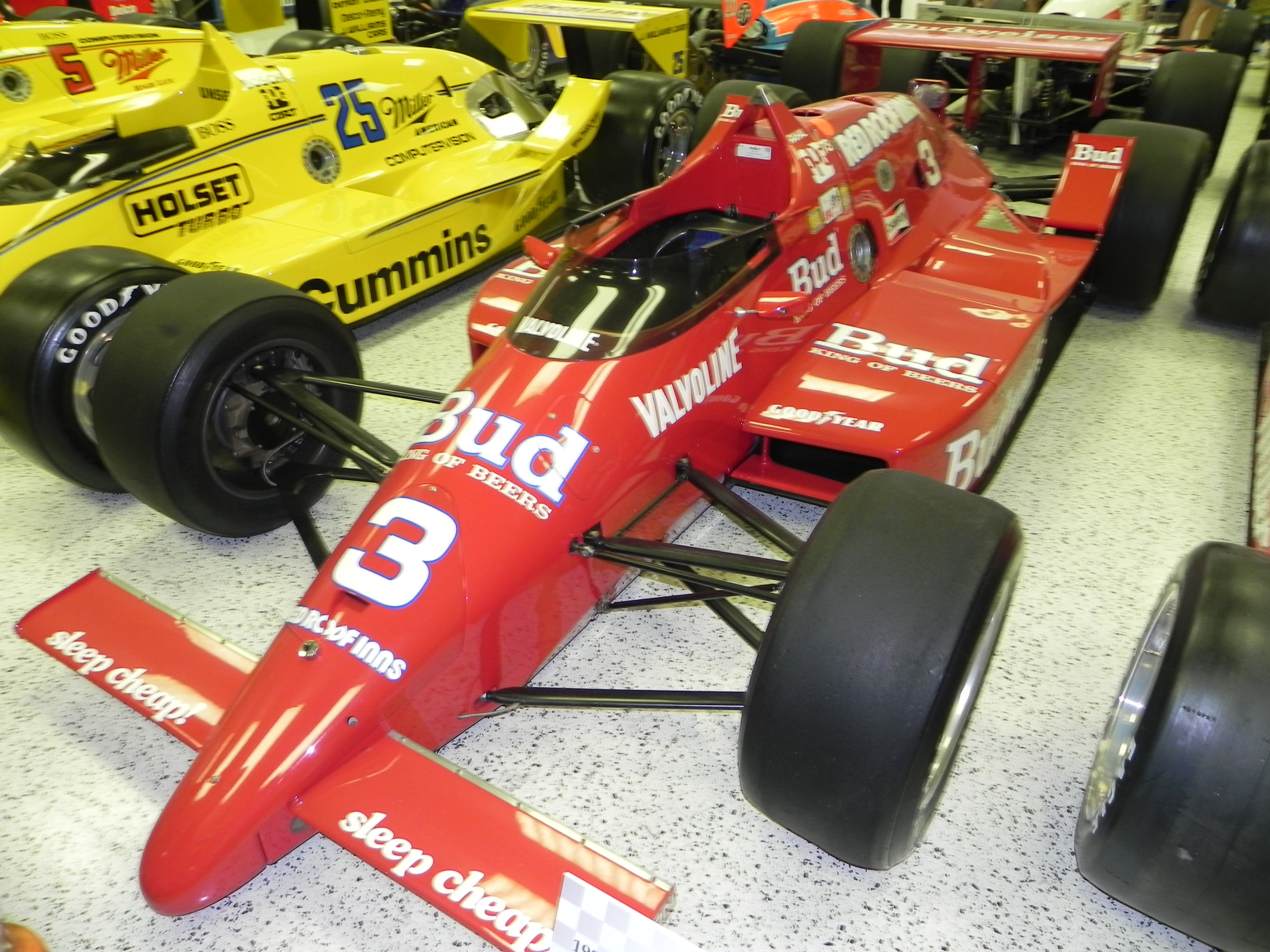
Bobby Rahal's winning car.

With 14 laps to go, Rick Mears led Bobby Rahal and Kevin Cogan. Fourth place Michael Andretti was still clinging on to the tail-end of the lead lap, running just ahead of Mears. The leaders approached a string of slower cars, and Mears was experiencing handling difficulties in traffic. Mears got caught up behind a slower car, and Rahal pounced. Down the backstretch, Rahal got by Mears to take the lead and raced towards turn 3. Cogan made a daring pass around the outside of Mears in turn four to take second place. Down the frontstretch, Rahal now found himself caught behind the slower car of Randy Lanier. Cogan diced back and forth, and slipped by Rahal going into turn one.

With less than 13 laps to go, Cogan was now in front. He opened up a three-second lead. Cogan's car was visibly loose in the turns, and on several occasions nearly clipped the outside wall in turn 2. Rahal was having trouble keeping up with the hard-charging Cogan, while Mears had slipped to third and appeared to be having some handling difficulties. With 7 laps to go, fourth place Michael Andretti ducked into the pit area for a splash of fuel. Suddenly on lap 194, Arie Luyendyk who was running 11th, spun exiting turn four. His car whipped around and lightly tagged the inside wall near the entrance of the pits. The yellow flag came out, and the field was bunched up behind the pace car. Cogan's lead was erased. There was some conjecture that the race could finish under yellow, with Cogan the certain winner. With the help of the yellow, the fuel concerns were now lessened.

Safety crews were able to clear the incident quickly. Cogan led, with Rahal second, and Mears third, nose-to-tail on the track. With 2 1/2 laps to go, the lights on the pace car were turned off, signifying that the field was ready to go back to green. Cogan, Rahal, and Mears picked up the pace in the north chute, and came out of turn four for a restart with two laps to go. Rahal got the jump on Cogan out of turn four, and took the lead mid-way down the frontstretch. Rahal led at the line, and dove in front of Cogan going into turn one.

Down the backstretch, Rahal pulled out to a 1-second lead. Mears set up to pass Cogan in turn three, but Cogan held off the challenge. Rahal took the white flag; his speed on the 199th lap was a noteworthy 203 mph (327 km/h). Rahal pulled out to a 1.4-second advantage, and won his first (and only as a driver) Indianapolis 500. Cogan and Mears finished second and third, in what was the closest three-car finish at the time. Rahal's final lap was an all-time record 209.152 mph (336.598 km/h), the fastest race lap to-date in Indy 500 competition.

Rahal completed the 500 miles (800 km) in 2 hours, 55 minutes, 43.470 seconds; becoming the first driver to complete the Indianapolis 500 in less than three hours. His average speed of 170.722 broke Rick Mears' 1984 record. Rahal later claimed that his fuel warning light had come on during the final lap, and a post-race inspection showed that only two gallons of methanol fuel remained in his tank.

== Box score ==
Finish	Start	No	Name	Team	Chassis	Engine	Qual	Laps	Status
1	4	3	(United States) Bobby Rahal	Truesports	March 86C	Cosworth DFX	213.550	200	170.722 mph
2	6	7	(United States) Kevin Cogan	Patrick Racing	March 86C	Cosworth DFX	211.922	200	+1.441 seconds
3	1	4	(United States) Rick Mears W	Penske Racing	March 86C	Cosworth DFX	216.828	200	+1.881 seconds
4	8	5	(Colombia) Roberto Guerrero	Bignotti Cotter Racing	March 86C	Cosworth DFX	211.576	200	+10.558 seconds
5	9	30	(United States) Al Unser Jr.	Doug Shierson Racing	Lola T86/00	Cosworth DFX	211.533	199	Flagged
6	3	18	(United States) Michael Andretti	KRACO Racing	March 86C	Cosworth DFX	214.522	199	Flagged
7	11	20	(Brazil) Emerson Fittipaldi	Patrick Racing	March 86C	Cosworth DFX	210.237	199	Flagged
8	12	21	(United States) Johnny Rutherford W	Alex Morales Motorsports	March 86C	Cosworth DFX	210.220	198	Flagged
9	2	1	(United States) Danny Sullivan W	Penske Racing	March 86C	Cosworth DFX	215.382	197	Flagged
10	13	12	(United States) Randy Lanier R	Arciero Racing	March 86C	Cosworth DFX	209.964	195	Flagged
11	29	24	(United States) Gary Bettenhausen	Leader Card Racing	March 86C	Cosworth DFX	209.756	193	Flagged
12	20	8	(Australia) Geoff Brabham	Galles Racing	Lola T86/00	Cosworth DFX	207.082	193	Flagged
13	22	22	(Brazil) Raul Boesel	Dick Simon Racing	Lola T86/00	Cosworth DFX	211.202	192	Flagged
14	33	23	(United States) Dick Simon	Dick Simon Racing	Lola T86/00	Cosworth DFX	204.978	189	Flagged
15	19	61	(Netherlands) Arie Luyendyk	Provimi Racing	Lola T86/00	Cosworth DFX	207.811	188	Crash T4
16	14	15	(United States) Pancho Carter	Galles Racing	Lola T86/00	Buick V-6	209.635	179	Wheel Bearing
17	10	66	(United States) Ed Pimm	Curb Racing	March 86C	Cosworth DFX	210.874	168	Electrical
18	17	55	(Mexico) Josele Garza	Machinists Union Racing	March 86C	Cosworth DFX	208.939	167	Flagged
19	32	9	(Brazil) Roberto Moreno R	Galles Racing	Lola T86/00	Cosworth DFX	209.469	158	Stalled
20	15	81	(Canada) Jacques Villeneuve R	Hemelgarn Racing	March 86C	Cosworth DFX	209.397	154	Main Bearing
21	25	59	(United States) Chip Ganassi	Machinists Union Racing	March 86C	Cosworth DFX	207.590	151	Engine
22	5	11	(United States) Al Unser Sr. W	Penske Racing	Penske PC-15	Ilmor-Chevrolet	212.295	149	Vibration
23	16	25	(United States) Danny Ongais	Panavision	March 86C	Buick V-6	209.158	136	Ignition
24	21	14	(United States) A. J. Foyt W	A. J. Foyt Enterprises	March 86C	Cosworth DFX	213.212	135	Spun in pits
25	27	6	(United States) Rich Vogler	Alex Morales Motorsports	March 86C	Cosworth DFX	209.089	132	Crash T3
26	31	84	(United States) George Snider	A. J. Foyt Enterprises	March 86C	Buick V-6	209.025	110	Ignition
27	28	95	(United States) Johnny Parsons	Machinists Union Racing	March 86C	Cosworth DFX	207.894	100	CV Joint
28	18	16	(United States) Tony Bettenhausen Jr.	Bettenhausen Motorsports	March 86C	Cosworth DFX	208.933	77	Valve Spring
29	26	31	(United Kingdom) Jim Crawford	Team ASC	March 86C	Cosworth DFX	208.911	70	Head Gasket
30	23	71	(United States) Scott Brayton	Hemelgarn Racing	March 86C	Cosworth DFX	208.079	69	Engine
31	24	42	(United States) Phil Krueger R	Leader Card Racing	March 85C	Cosworth DFX	207.948	67	Engine
32	30	2	(United States) Mario Andretti W	Newman/Haas Racing	Lola T86/00	Cosworth DFX	212.300	19	Ignition
33	7	33	(United States) Tom Sneva W	Curb Racing	March 86C	Cosworth DFX	211.878	0	Crash T2

W Former Indianapolis 500 winner

R Indianapolis 500 Rookie

All cars utilized Goodyear tires.

=== Race statistics ===
Lap Leaders
Laps	Leader
1–42	Michael Andretti
43	Kevin Cogan
44–47	Al Unser Jr.
48	Emerson Fittipaldi
49–74	Rick Mears
75	Bobby Rahal
76–77	Kevin Cogan
78–79	Al Unser Jr.
80–82	Michael Andretti
83–101	Bobby Rahal
102	Rick Mears
103–135	Bobby Rahal
136–165	Rick Mears
166	Bobby Rahal
167	Rick Mears
168	Roberto Guerrero
169–186	Rick Mears
187	Bobby Rahal
188–197	Kevin Cogan
198–200	Bobby Rahal

Total laps led
Driver	Laps
Rick Mears	76
Bobby Rahal	58
Michael Andretti	45
Kevin Cogan	13
Al Unser Jr.	6
Emerson Fittipaldi	1
Roberto Guerrero	1

Cautions: 6 for 29 laps
Laps	Reason
Pace lap	(Red Flag) Tom Sneva crashed at exit of turn 2
15–19	Mario Andretti stalled in turn 3
52–56	Debris in turn 1
102–106	Johnny Parsons crashed on backstretch
136–141	Rich Vogler crashed in turn 3
166–169	Roberto Moreno stalled in turn 3
195–198	Arie Luyendyk spun and crashed near pit entrance

== Post race ==
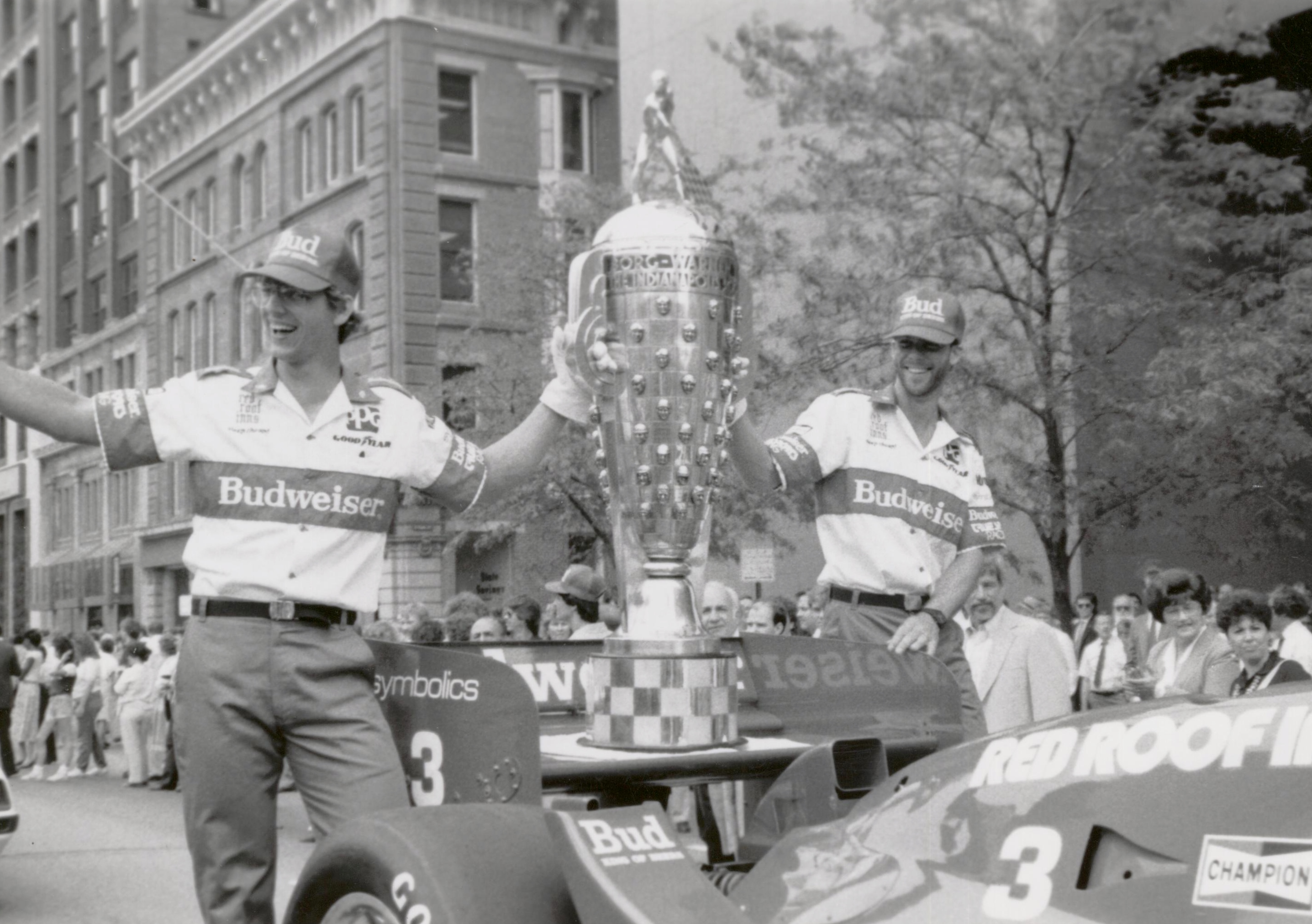
Truesports victory parade

The race celebration was emotional for the Truesports team, in that owner Jim Trueman was stricken with colon cancer. Visibly frail and lacking strength, he managed to arrive in victory lane to celebrate with his driver Bobby Rahal. Trueman was interviewed in victory lane by ABC-TV reporter Jack Arute, and took a swig of the traditional milk. According to Arute, Trueman was clinging to his shoulder, as he barely possessed the strength to stand on his own. After the cameras were turned off, he whispered to Arute "I can go now". Due to the rain delay, the traditional victory banquet was canceled. A makeshift victory luncheon was held in its place on Sunday June 1 at the Speedway Motel. The top three finishers were invited to the private reception. Later, Rahal's crew celebrated with a lunch at the nearby Red Lobster.

The city of Columbus held a victory celebration downtown on June 5. Over 300 Red Roof Inn employees took part in a parade down Broad Street. Trueman was too sick to attend. On June 11, Trueman succumbed to his illness, at the age of 51.

Rahal and the Truesports team rode the wave of success to five additional wins during the CART season, and clinched the 1986 CART championship. The team made it back-to-back titles by winning the 1987 CART championship as well.

Kevin Cogan suffered through his second major disappointment at Indy, following the misfortunes of 1982. Despite winning the season opener at Phoenix, he faded as a contender during the season. He also was asked several times, during the month of May, about his accident in 1982 with Andretti and Foyt, leading Cogan to reportedly exit a press conference early. Race winner Rahal, on Cogan's redemption story, remarked afterwards, "1982 was a bum rap. The drivers treated him unfairly. He suffered through some rough times . . . I can't imagine what it must have been like to go to a race and have people boo you."

== Broadcasting ==
=== Radio ===
The race was carried live on the IMS Radio Network. Paul Page served as the chief announcer for the tenth year. It was Page's thirteenth year overall as part of the network crew. Lou Palmer reported from victory lane. Bobby Unser, Page's frequent booth partner on NBC Sports, joined the broadcast for the first and only time as "driver expert."

Ron Carrell and Jerry Baker swapped places, with Carrell moving to the north pits (where he remained until 1990) and Baker moving to the high-profile Turn 1 location. Baker remained in that location until 2017 (except 2010 and 2013 when it was vacant) as he would depart the crew and join the public address crew for 2018 when it was decided that Turn 1 would not be used in 2018, but due to a new broadcast booth debuting in 2019 named after Sid Collins, Turn 1's broadcasting location would be reinstated. Gary Gerould (one of Page's NBC colleagues), made his first appearance as a pit reporter, sharing duties in the south pits with Lou Palmer.

Luke Walton reprised his traditional duty of introducing the starting command during the pre-race, however, he did not have an active role during the race.

Indianapolis Motor Speedway Radio Network
Booth Announcers	Turn Reporters	Pit/garage reporters
Chief Announcer: Paul Page; Driver expert: Bobby Unser; Statistician: John DeCamp; Historian: Donald Davidson	Turn 1: Jerry Baker; Turn 2: Howdy Bell; Turn 3: Larry Henry; Turn 4: Bob Jenkins	Luke Walton (pre-race); Sally Larvick (interviews)
Chief Announcer: Paul Page; Driver expert: Bobby Unser; Statistician: John DeCamp; Historian: Donald Davidson	Turn 1: Jerry Baker; Turn 2: Howdy Bell; Turn 3: Larry Henry; Turn 4: Bob Jenkins	Bob Forbes (north pits/garages); Ron Carrell (north pits); Chuck Marlowe (center pits); Gary Gerould (south pits); Lou Palmer (south pits)

=== Television ===
The race was carried in the United States on ABC Sports on live, flag-to-flag coverage for the first time. Jim McKay moved to the host position, while Jim Lampley served as announcer.

The initial live broadcast set for Sunday, May 25 was rained out. The telecast was filled with interviews, talk, and highlights of previous races. The broadcast returned on Saturday, May 31 for the live coverage of the race.

Three pit reporters served on the crew, joined by Donna de Varona, who was slated to serve as a roving reporter, conducting interviews and other features. However, she appeared only on the original Sunday telecast, and did not return on Saturday. Dr. Joe Randolph was also announced as part of the team, slated to report from the medical center, but he never appeared on-air.

Three RaceCams were used (none were utilized in 1985), with defending champion Danny Sullivan the highest-profile driver to feature one. For the first time, the broadcast carried all of the pre-race ceremonies live, although they omitted coverage of the invocation.

The broadcast has re-aired numerous times on ESPN Classic since the mid-2000s.

ABC Television
Booth Announcers	Pit/garage reporters
Host: Jim McKay; Announcer: Jim Lampley; Color: Sam Posey	Jack Arute; Larry Nuber; Al Trautwig; Donna de Varona (May 25 only); Dr. Joe Randolph (not utilized)

== 1985–86 USAC Gold Crown Championship ==
1985–86 USAC Championship Car season
- USAC Gold Crown Championship

Season
- Races: 1

Awards
- National champion: (United States) Bobby Rahal

The 1985–86 USAC Gold Crown Championship season consisted of one sanctioned race. The schedule was based on a split-calendar, beginning in June 1985 and running through May 1986. Starting in 1981, USAC scaled back their participation in top-level Indy car racing, and ultimately ceased sanctioning races outside of the Indianapolis 500 following their 1983–84 season. Subsequently, the Gold Crown Championship would consist of only one event annually; the winner of the Indianapolis 500 would be the de facto Gold Crown champion, as it was their lone points-paying event. The preeminent national championship season was instead sanctioned by CART, and the Indy 500 paid championship points separately (on a different scale) toward the CART championship as well.

Bobby Rahal, by virtue of winning the 1986 Indianapolis 500, also won the 1985–86 USAC Championship.

=== Final points standings (Top five) ===
Pos	Driver	INDY (United States)	Pts
1	(United States) Bobby Rahal	1	1000
2	(United States) Kevin Cogan	2	800
3	(United States) Rick Mears	3	700
4	(Colombia) Roberto Guerrero	4	600
5	(United States) Al Unser Jr.	5	500

== Selected rules and specifications ==
Engine regulations
Engine Type	Maximum Displacement	Turbocharger Boost
Turbocharged DOHC V-8	161.7 cu in (2.65 L)	47 inHg (1,600 mbar)
Turbocharged Stock Block V-6	209.3 cu in (3.43 L)	57 inHg (1,900 mbar)
Normally aspriated OHC	274.6 cu in (4.50 L)	—
Normally aspriated Stock Block	355.1 cu in (5.82 L)	—
Fuel	On-board capacity	Total allotment
Methanol	40 US gal (151.4 L)	280 US gal (1,100 L)

Rookie Test
Phase	Laps	Speed bracket
1	10	175–180 mph
2	10	180–185 mph
3*	10	185–190 mph
4*	10	190–195 mph

*Veteran Refresher tests consisted of Phases 3–4 of the rookie test.

== Gallery ==
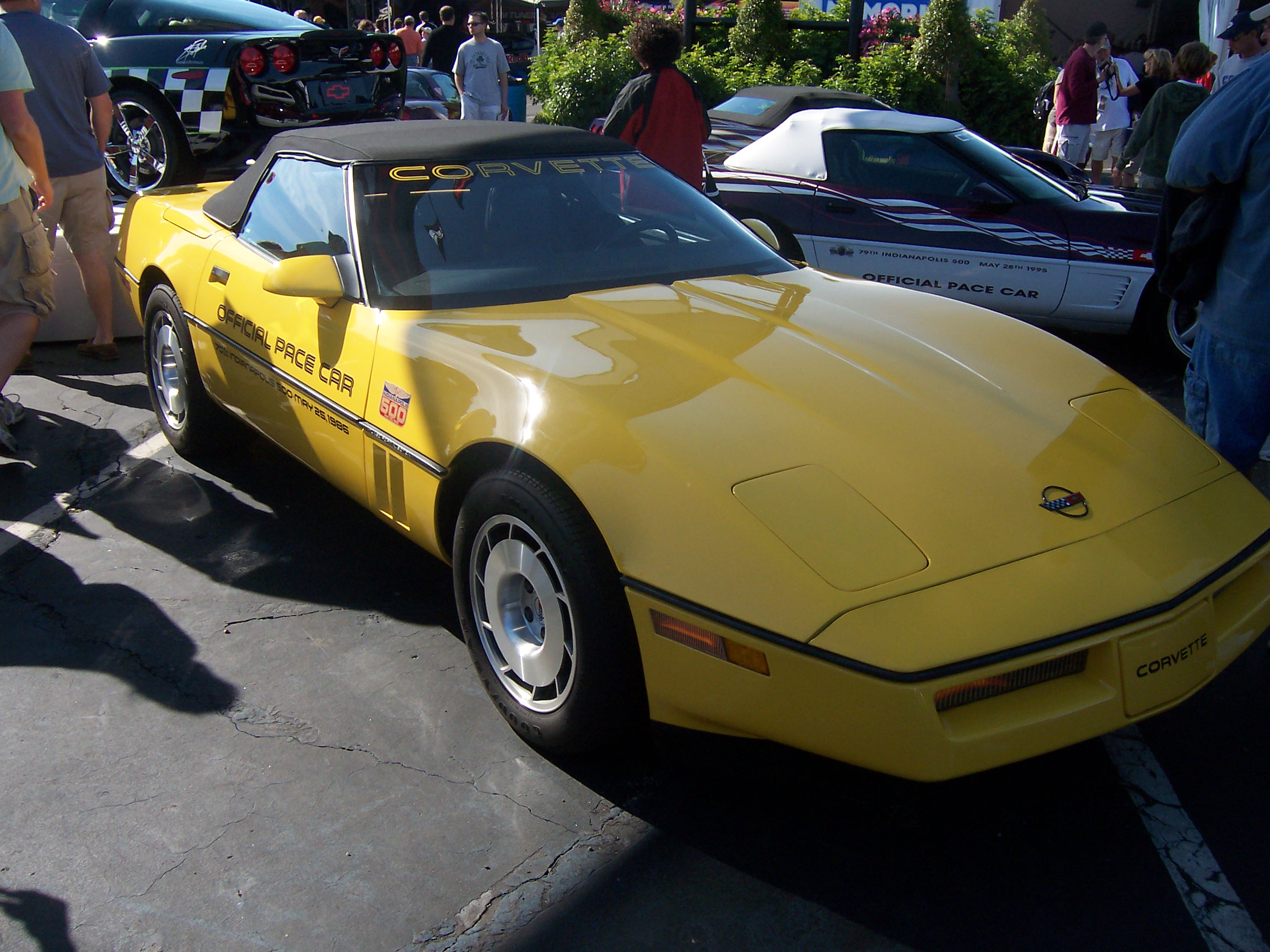
1986 Chevrolet Corvette pace car

Winning car owner Jim Trueman

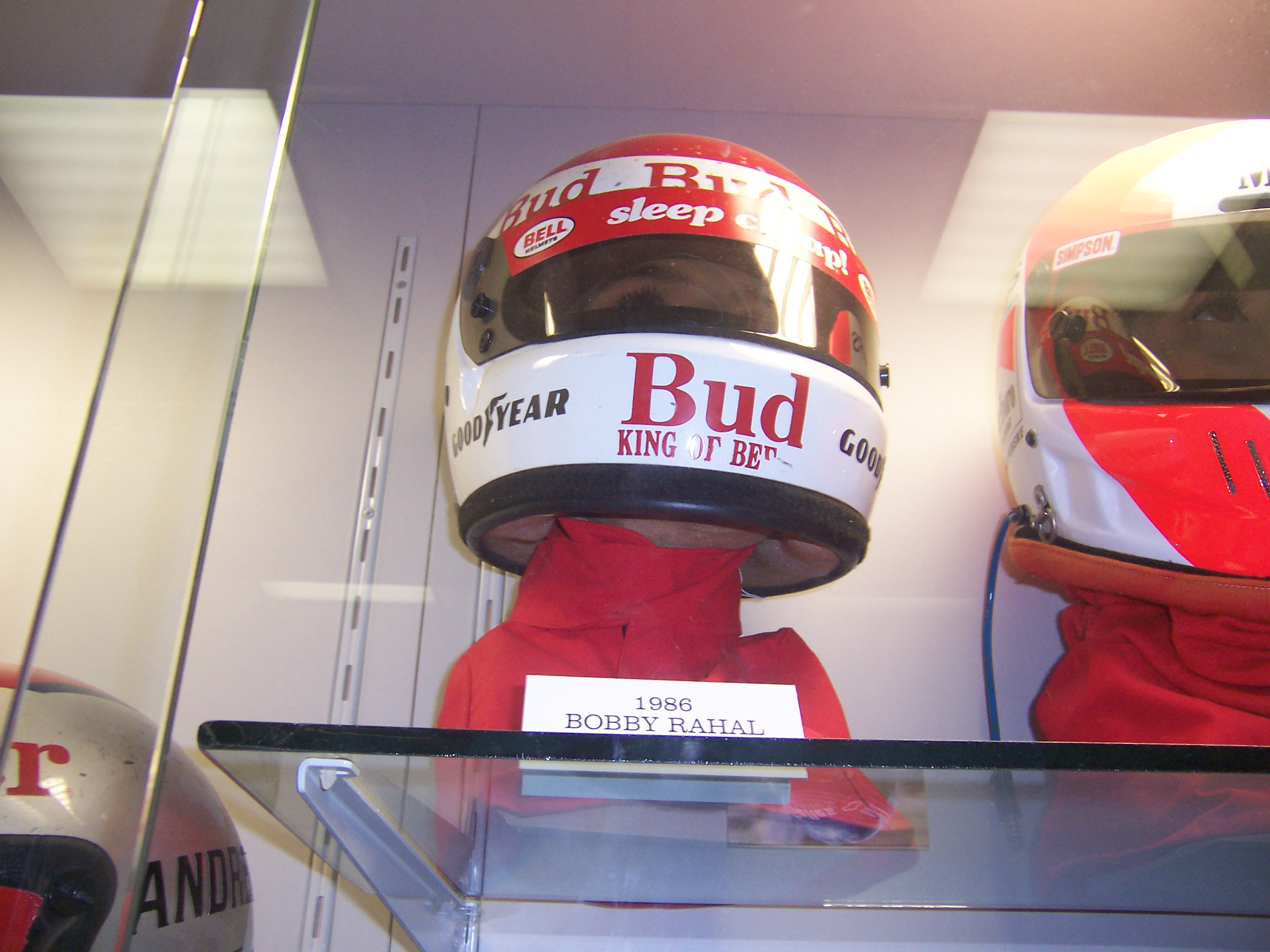
Race-worn helmet of Bobby Rahal on display at the Indianapolis Motor Speedway Hall of Fame Museum

== Notes ==
=== References ===
28. RUNNER-UP ROLE REMOVES CLOUD OVER COGAN FROM 1982 ACCIDENT https://www.orlandosentinel.com/news/os-xpm-1986-06-01-0220430247-story.html

=== Works cited ===
- 1986 Indianapolis 500 Day-By-Day Trackside Report For the Media
- Indianapolis 500 History: Race & All-Time Stats - Official Site
- 1986 Indianapolis 500 Radio Broadcast, Indianapolis Motor Speedway Radio Network

1985 Indianapolis 500; Danny Sullivan	1986 Indianapolis 500; Bobby Rahal	1987 Indianapolis 500; Al Unser
Preceded by 163.612 mph (1984 Indianapolis 500)	Record for the fastest average speed 170.722 mph	Succeeded by 185.981 mph (1990 Indianapolis 500)
