= Truesports =

Automobile Racing Team

Jim Trueman during practice at the 1986 Indy 500

Truesports was an automobile racing team founded by Jim Trueman based in Hilliard, Ohio. The team is best known for winning the 1986 Indianapolis 500 and back-to-back CART championships in 1986 and 1987. The team won 19 points-paying Indy car races.

The word "Truesports" is a portmanteau of the surname "Trueman" and the word "sports" or perhaps the word "motorsports." The primary crew chief of the team was Steve Horne, who would later start Tasman Motorsports.

In 1993, the team was absorbed into what is now Rahal Letterman Racing.

== Racing team ==
=== Early years ===
Jim Trueman himself started racing sports cars in 1962. In the 1970s, Trueman met up with Bobby Rahal, and they entered the Can-Am series. After several seasons in Can-Am, Trueman and Rahal began to look towards the CART series and the Indianapolis 500.

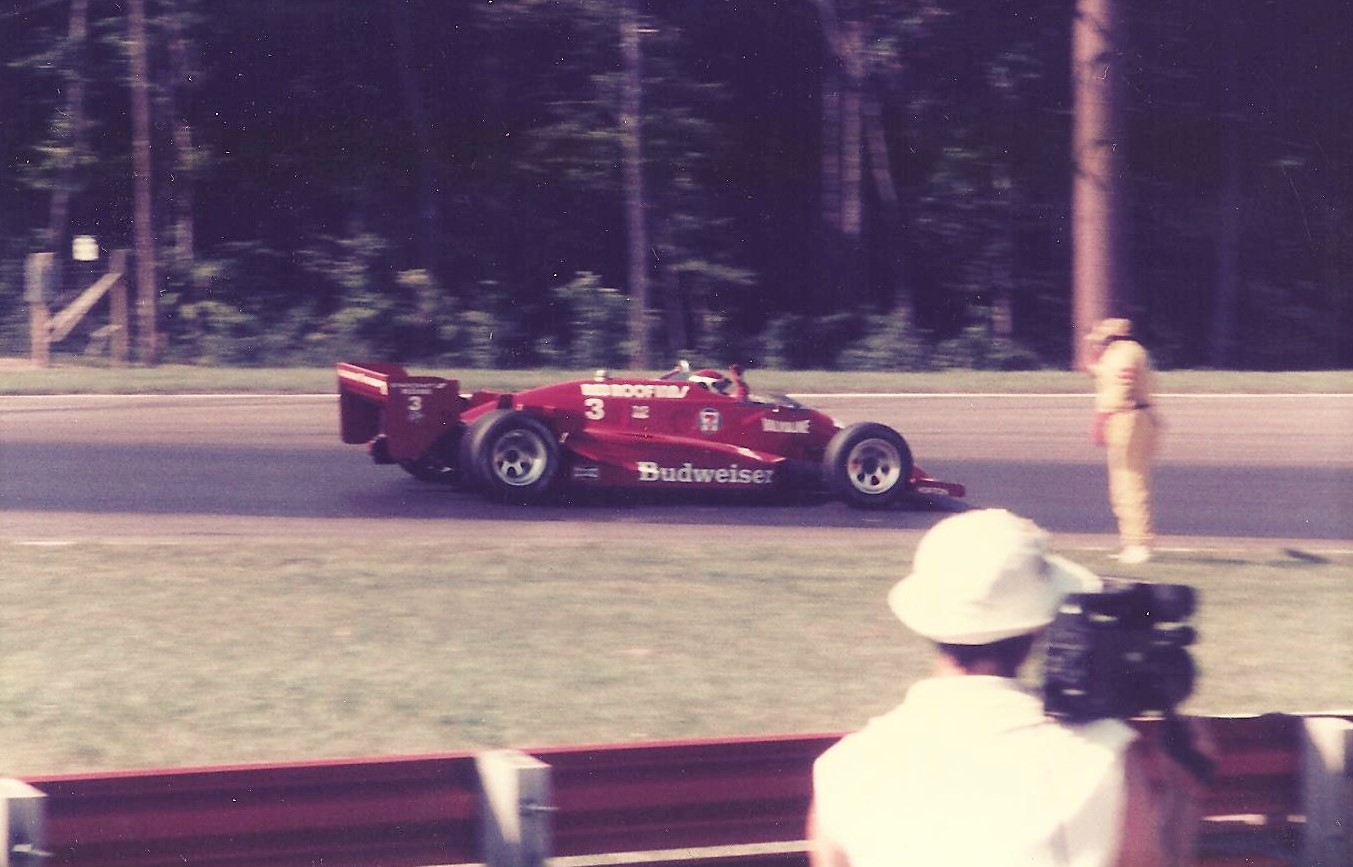
Bobby Rahal celebrates victory for Truesports at Mid-Ohio in 1985.

In 1981, Trueman sponsored the car of owner/driver Vern Schuppan in the Indianapolis 500 through his Red Roof Inn motel business. The car came home third. Starting in 1982, the Truesports CART team was founded with Bobby Rahal driving. Rahal won his first race midway through the season at Cleveland. He followed that up with another win at Michigan, a second-place finish in the season standings, and clinched the CART rookie of the year award.

In 1983 and 1984, Truesports continued to succeed with Rahal behind the wheel. They won three more races, and placed 7th at the 1984 Indianapolis 500.

In 1985, Truesports secured the sponsorship of Budweiser. Rahal qualified for the front row at Indy, but early in the race, mechanical problems ended their day. Later in the season, Rahal made a strong charge in the championship points standings. He had a stretch of three wins over a five race span, and placed third in the final points standings.

Concurrent with their primary CART effort, Truesports ventured into IMSA racing on several occasions in the mid-1980s. In 1982, Trueman and Rahal finished second at the 12 Hours of Sebring. The duo also teamed up to race in the 1982 24 Hours of Le Mans with Garretson Developments, with whom Rahal won the 1981 24 Hours of Daytona.

=== Championship seasons ===
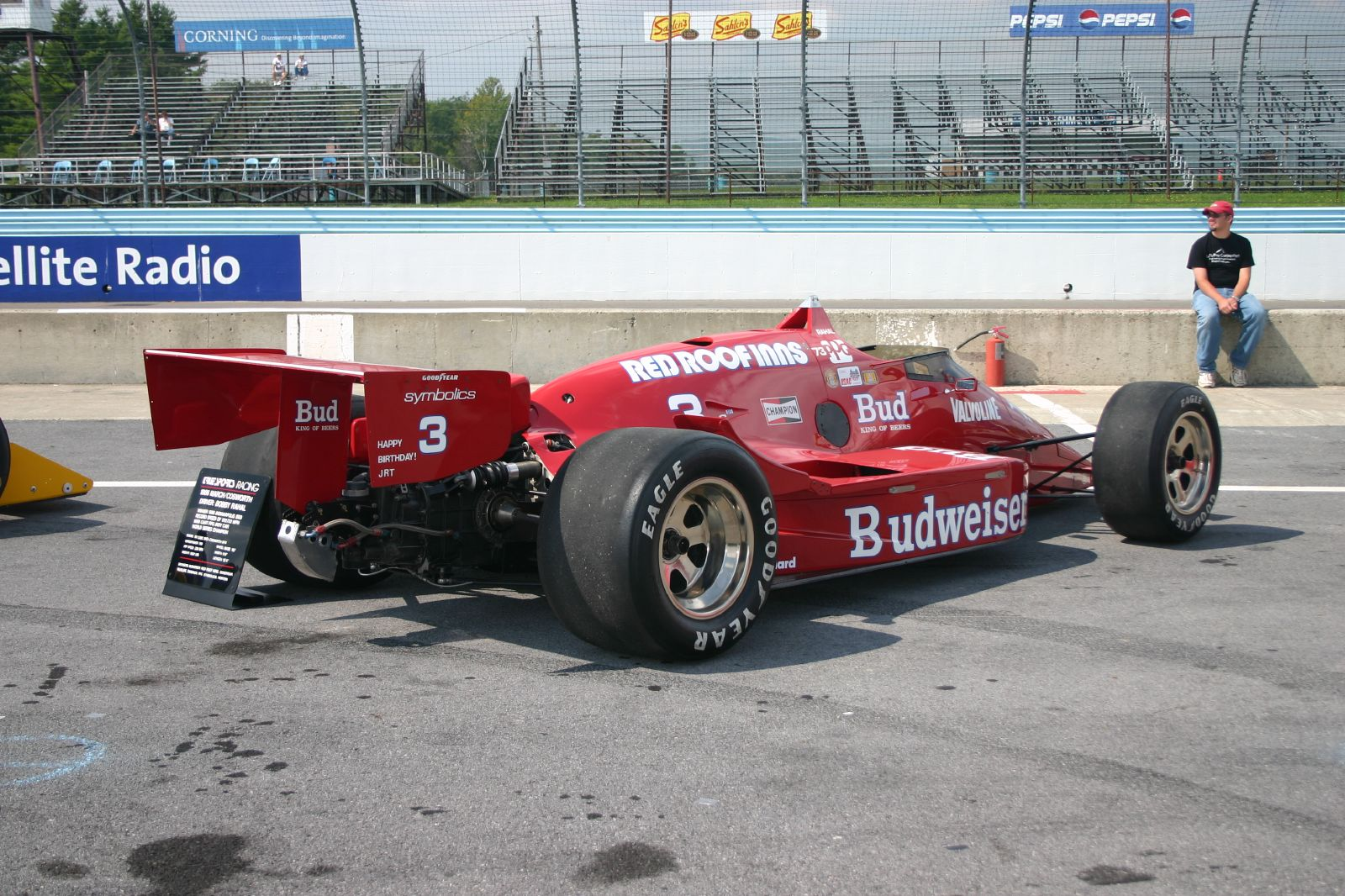
The Truesports March 86C driven by Bobby Rahal to the 1986 Indy 500 and CART championships

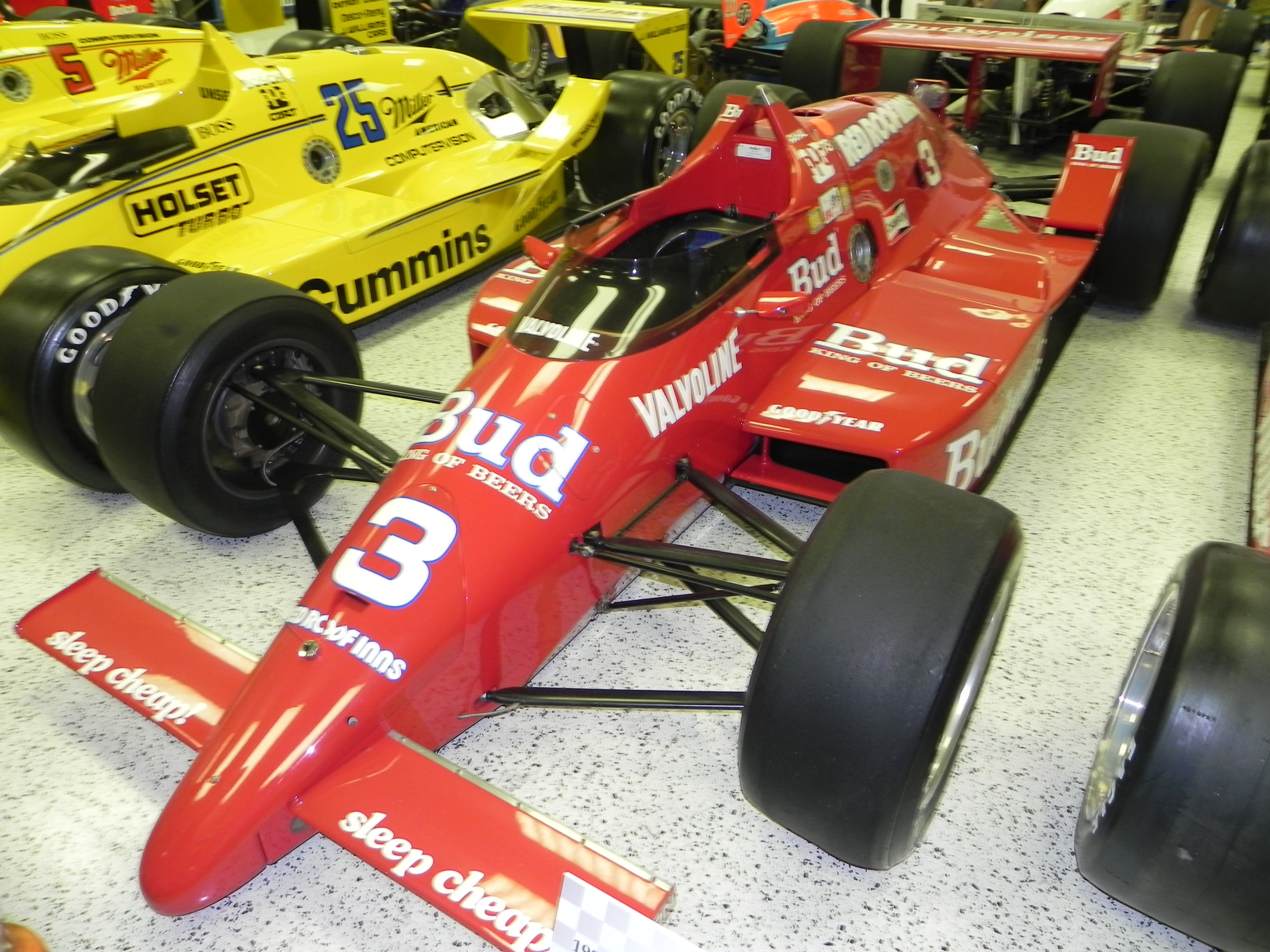
1986 Indy 500 winning car.

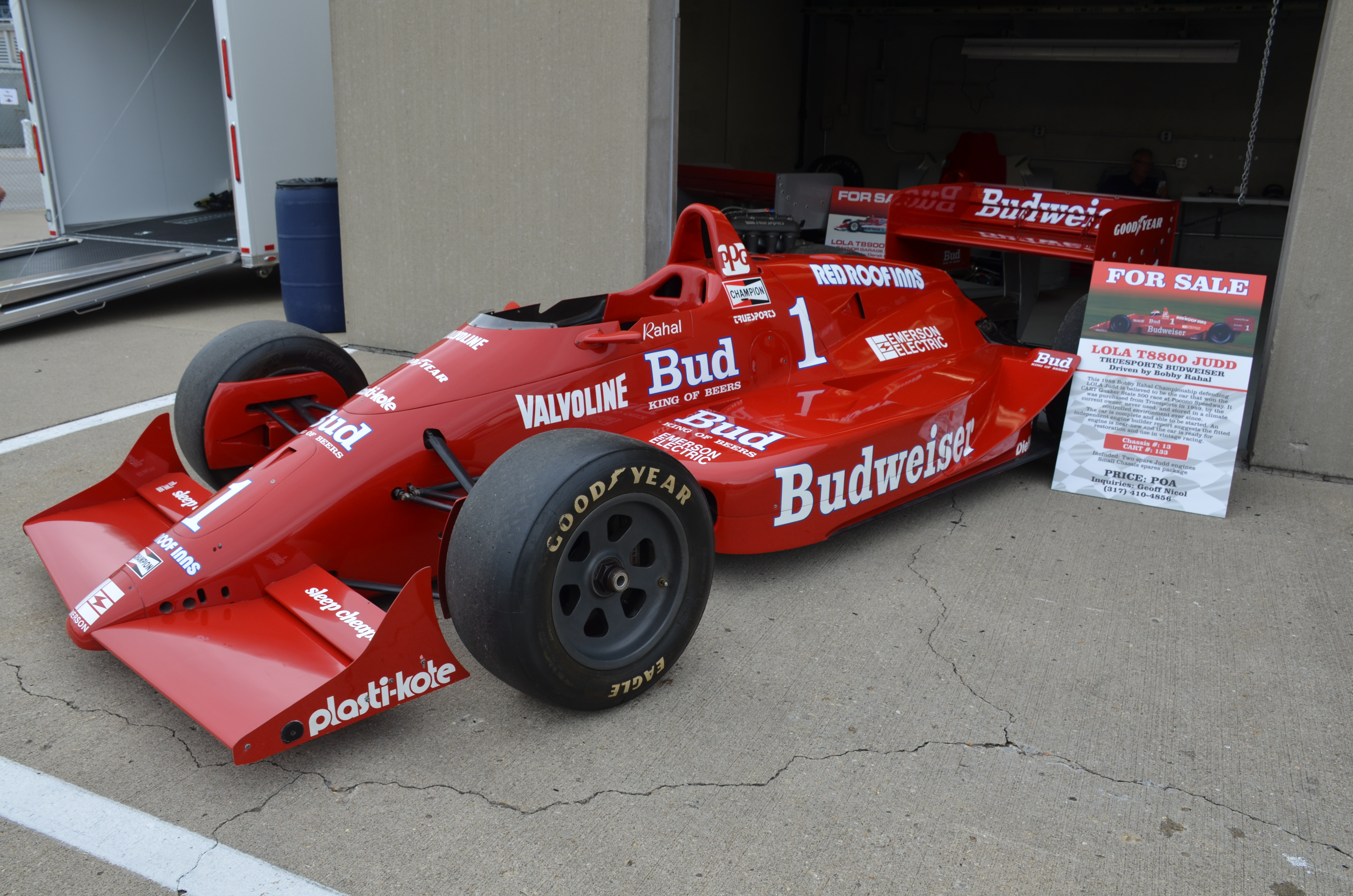
1988 Pocono 500 winning car.

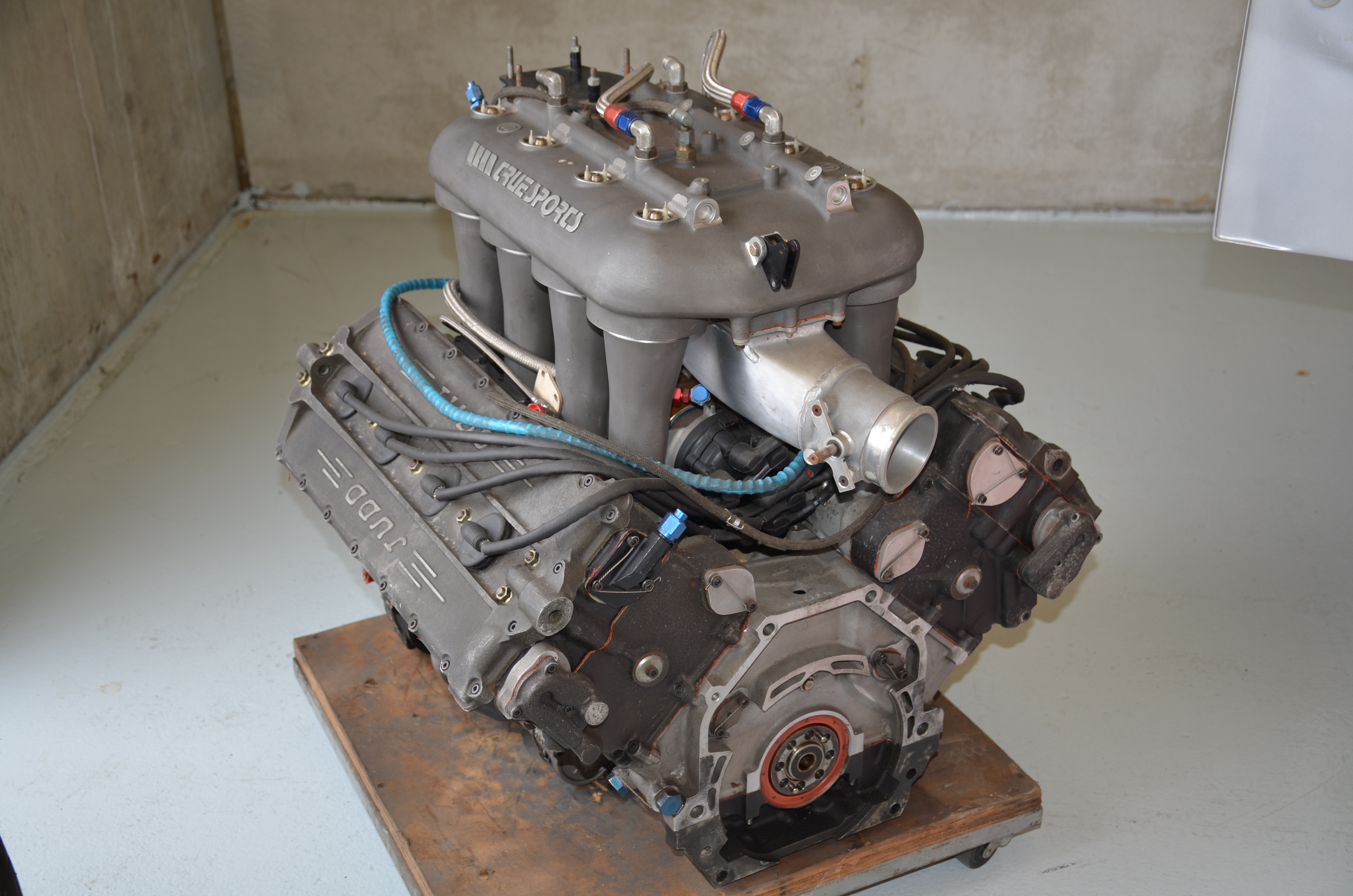
1988 Truesports Judd AV Indy car engine

Truesports racing entered 1986 with considerable anticipation. The highlight of the season was a victory at the 1986 Indianapolis 500. After a two-year battle with cancer, team owner Jim Trueman succumbed to the disease eleven days after the Indy 500 victory. The team dedicated their efforts to Trueman's memory, and Rahal went on to win six races, and the 1986 CART championship.

For 1987, Steve Horne and other members of the Trueman family had assumed day-to-day operations of the team. Truesports switched from March to the Lola chassis, and remained with the reliable Cosworth DFX powerplant. Several of the top team in CART (Penske, Patrick, and Newman/Haas) had moved to the more powerful Chevrolet-Ilmor. Despite this, Truesports continued to see success on the track.

Hoping to win back-to-back races at Indianapolis, Rahal qualified second. Having switched to the Lola, he enjoyed a comfortable month, while many competitors (particularly those in March and Penske chassis), were experiencing a tumultuous time getting their cars up to speed. Race day, however, ended early for Rahal due to an ignition problem. Rahal won three races during the season, and clinched his second consecutive CART title.

Also in 1987, Truesports won the ARS Championship with driver Didier Theys. ARS was the precursor to the modern day Indy Lights series.

=== Changes ===
For 1988, Truesports switched to the Judd engine. It was known to be underpowered but very reliable and competitive in the 500-mile races due to its high fuel economy. Rahal finished 4th at Indianapolis, second in the Michigan 500, and won the Pocono 500. The Pocono win, however, was the lone win of the season, and Rahal chose to leave the team at the end of the year.

In 1989, Truesports signed rookie Scott Pruett as driver. Pruett won co-Rookie of the Year at Indianapolis, and had one second-place finish (Detroit). He went into the Detroit race with a decided advantage. He was one of few drivers in the field familiar with the Detroit street circuit (previously a Formula One course), and had won the SCCA Trans-Am Motor City 100 (a support race for the Formula One event) in 1987.

In March 1990, Pruett was seriously injured in a preseason testing crash at West Palm Beach, Florida, an IMSA street course. Raul Boesel drove as a replacement for the entire season. His best finish was 6th place. Pruett spend the entire 1990 season on the sidelines in physical rehab.

=== Chassis program ===
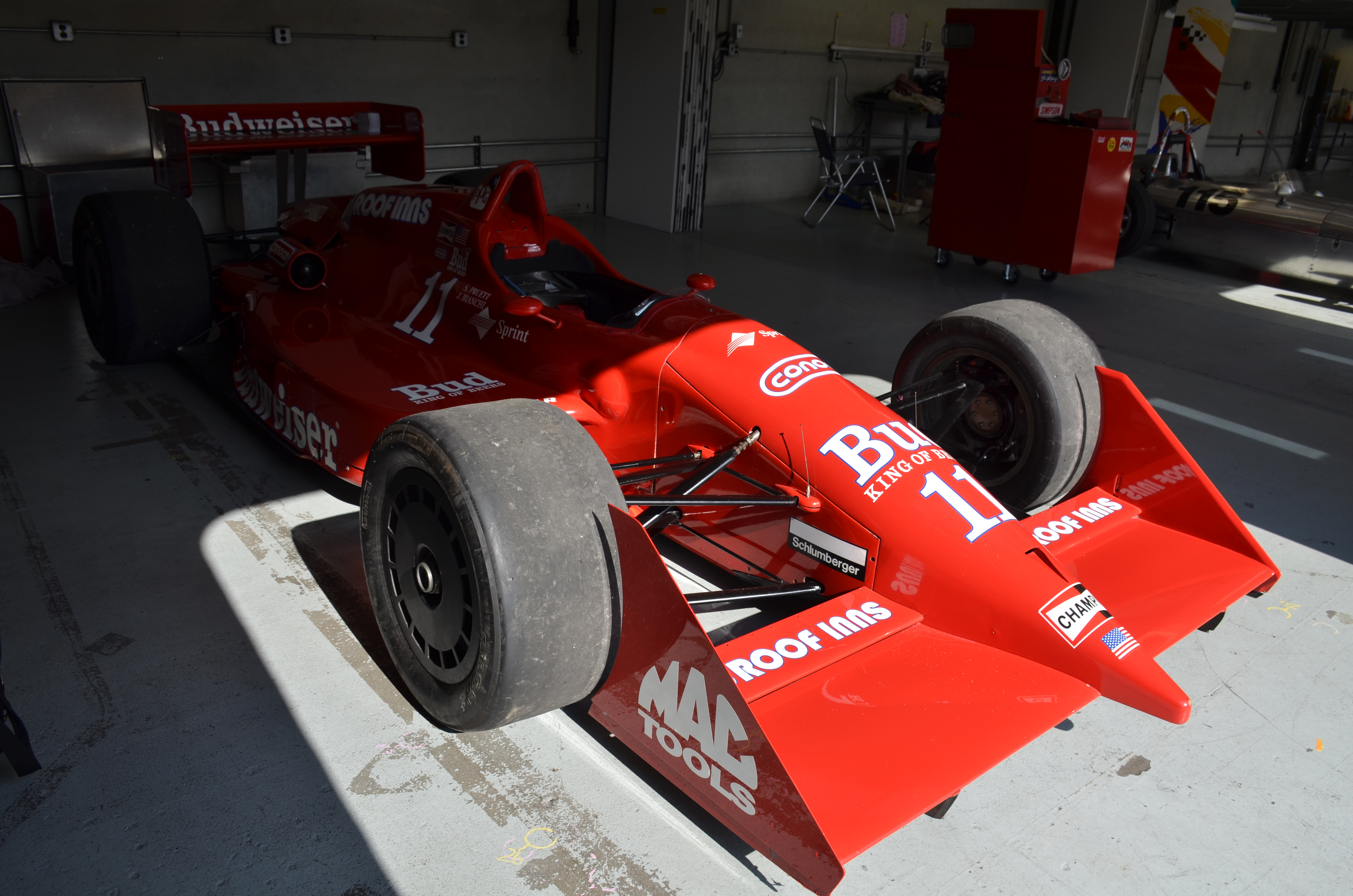
1991 Truesports 91C-01 chassis

In 1985, Trueman and Rahal traveled to Italy to meet with Ferrari and made a demonstration run for them with a March 85C-Cosworth. Later, Ferrari built their own Indy car chassis, the Ferrari 637, and Truesports seemed poised to become the first team to compete with it. The chassis partnership, however, never materialized, and was instead merely a bargaining tool by the Ferrari Formula One team.

Starting in 1990, Truesports began exploring an in-house chassis building program. The Truesports All-American chassis was set to debut for 1991 CART season. Unlike the in-house Penske and Galmer chassis of the time, which were assembled in England, the Truesports chassis notably was constructed entirely in the U.S. The fabrication work was based out of their Hilliard, Ohio shops. In addition, the design team utilized a rolling road wind tunnel at the Aeronautical and Astronautical Research Laboratory at nearby Ohio State University.

Don Halliday did the primary design for the program. In 1990, the team drove the entire season in year-old Lola cars to save cost. When Pruett returned from injury in 1991, he drove the Truesports 91C-Judd machine to a respectable first season.

In 1992, the chassis was further developed, and was powered by the dominant Chevy Indy A engine. Pruett, however, still failed to win any races. Longtime sponsor Budweiser announced they were pulling out and switching to King Racing for 1993. Midway through the 1992 season, facing escalating costs, the team announced they were going to abandon the in-house chassis project. Steve Horne resigned in June.

=== Demise ===
Although it was not openly revealed at the time, the association with Ferrari (and subsequent cancellation of the chassis/engine program) in the late 1980s had an effect on the team. Though Rahal was defending champion of both the Indy 500 and the CART title, the team did not have the preferred Ilmor Chevy Indy V-8 engine for 1987 or 1988. The lack of a competitive engine was a key reason why Rahal left the team. Rahal's 1988 win at Pocono was the team's final triumph.

After a slumping 1992 season, the Truesports organization decided to reorganize its assets. The team's physical assets, headquarters, and chassis program was first leased, then eventually absorbed into the Rahal-Hogan Racing team, co-owned by former Truesports driver Bobby Rahal. The remainder of the Trueman family businesses operated separately.

In 1993, Rahal-Hogan Racing attempted to continue the Truesports chassis program. It was rebranded the R/H chassis, and quickly scored a second-place finish at Long Beach. The success was short-lived however, as the chassis proved uncompetitive on superspeedways. The team was dealt a massive blow when Rahal failed to qualify at Indianapolis a month later. The following week they switched to the more conventional Lola, while team driver Mike Groff attempted to salvage a season out of the R/H. By the end of the year, the chassis project was abandoned permanently.

=== CART Drivers ===
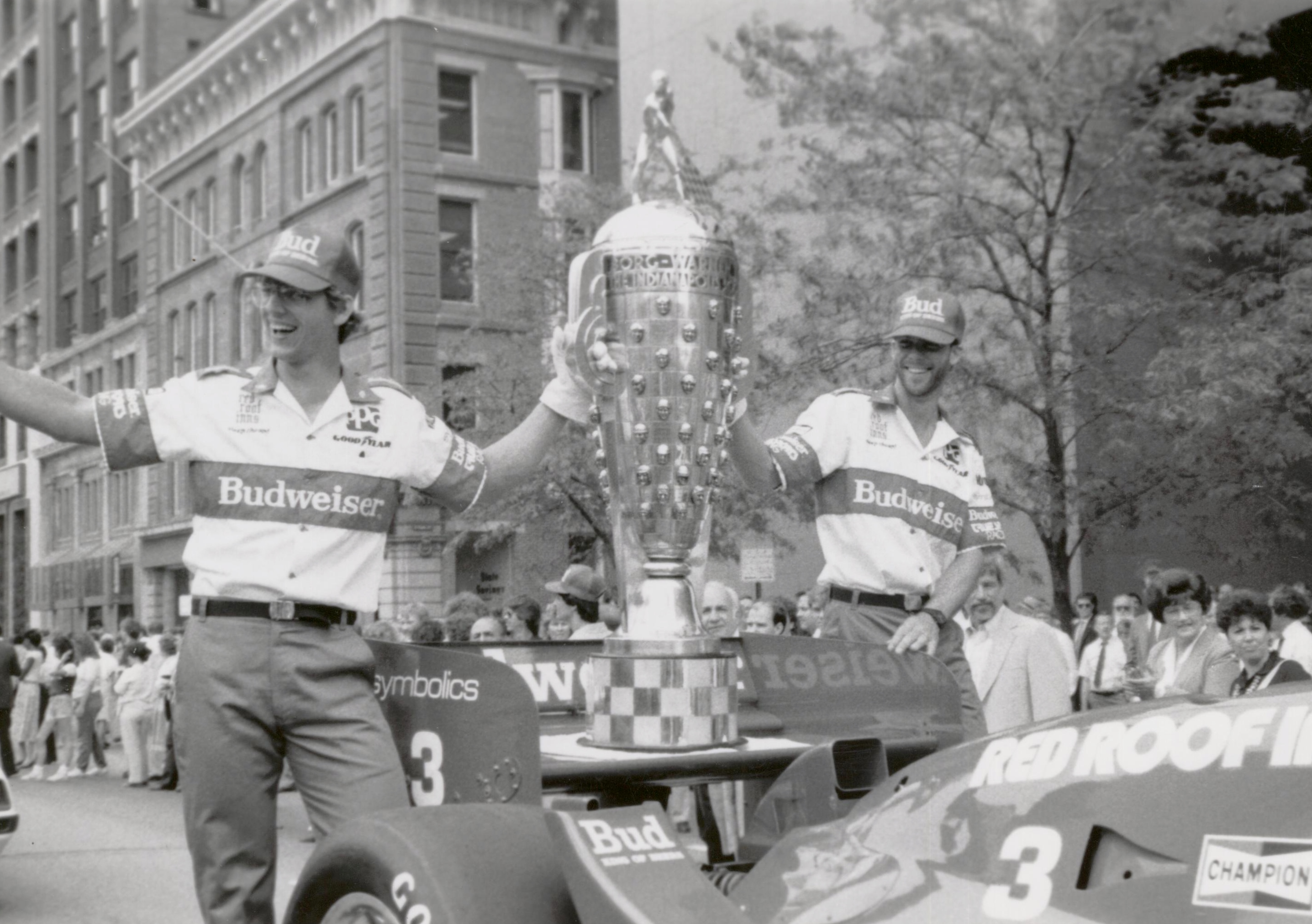
Truesports members holding the Borg-Warner Trophy at their 1986 Indy 500 victory parade.

- (United States) Bobby Rahal (1982–1988)
- (United States) Scott Pruett (1989, 1991–1992)
- (Brazil) Raul Boesel (1990)
- (Australia) Geoff Brabham (1991)

=== ARS Drivers ===
- (Belgium) Didier Theys
- (United States) Colin Trueman
- (New Zealand) Steve Millen

== Business ventures ==
- Mid-Ohio Sports Car Course - bought by Jim Trueman in 1981 and owned by the Trueman family.
- The Mid-Ohio School - A comprehensive driving and riding school, focusing on high performance, defensive driving, fleet training and competition licensing, since 1993
- Truesports Choice - A high performance automobile parts company
- Truepower - engine development organization
- Trueperformance - A high-line collision repair facility

== Complete Racing Results ==
=== PPG CART Indycar World Series ===
(key)

Year	Chassis	Engine	Drivers	No.	1	2	3	4	5	6	7	8	9	10	11	12	13	14	15	16	17	Pts Pos	Pos
1982					PHX	ATL	MIL	CLE	MCH	MIL	POC	RIV	ROA	MCH	PHX								
1982	March 82C	Cosworth DFX	(United States) Bobby Rahal (R)	19	18		20	1	3	2	3	15	3*	1*	5							2nd	242
1983					ATL	INDY	MIL	CLE	MCH	ROA	POC	RIV	MOH	MCH	CPL	LAG	PHX						
1983	March 83C	Cosworth DFX	(United States) Bobby Rahal	4		20																5th	94
1983	March 83C	Cosworth DFX	(United States) Bobby Rahal	2	21		6	19	5	10*	5	1		2								5th	94
1983	March 83C	Chevrolet V8	(United States) Bobby Rahal	2									3		9	7	DNQ					5th	94
1984					LBH	PHX	INDY	MIL	POR	MEA	CLE	MCH	ROA	POC	MOH	SAN	MCH	PHX	LAG	CPL			
1984	March 84C	Cosworth DFX	(United States) Bobby Rahal	5	14	7	7	14	Ret	11	14*	Ret	2	3	2	2*	5	1*	1*	7		3rd	137
1985					LBH	INDY	MIL	POR	MEA	CLE	MCH	ROA	POC	MOH	SAN	MCH	LAG	PHX	MIA				
1985	March 85C	Cosworth DFX	(United States) Bobby Rahal	3	27		9	20	25	28	6	4	4	1*	10	1*	1*	6	2*			3rd	133
1985	March 85C	Cosworth DFX	(United States) Bobby Rahal	10		27																3rd	133
1985	March 85C	Cosworth DFX	(Canada) Ludwig Heimrath, Jr. (R)	8										26								58th	0
1986					PHX	LBH	INDY	MIL	POR	MEA	CLE	TOR	MCH	POC	MOH	SAN	MCH	ROA	LAG	PHX	MIA		
1986	March 86C	Cosworth DFX	(United States) Bobby Rahal	3	16	18	1	6	20	3	15	1	10*	14	1	1*	1	5	1*	3	8	1st	179
1987					LBH	PHX	INDY	MIL	POR	MEA	CLE	TOR	MCH	POC	ROA	MOH	NAZ	LAG	MIA				
1987	Lola T87/00	Cosworth DFX	(United States) Bobby Rahal	1	23	2	26	2	1*	1*	2	3	3	5	23	2*	5	1	7			1st	188
1987	Lola T87/00	Cosworth DFX	(Belgium) Didier Theys (R)	2															17			30th	6
1988					PHX	LBH	INDY	MIL	POR	CLE	TOR	MEA	MCH	POC	MOH	ROA	NAZ	LAG	MIA				
1988	Lola T88/00	Judd AV	(United States) Bobby Rahal	1	16	2		6	12	2	5	5	2	1	18	2	12	4	18			3rd	136
1988	Lola T88/00	Judd AV	(United States) Bobby Rahal	4			5															3rd	136
1989					PHX	LBH	INDY	MIL	DET	POR	CLE	MEA	TOR	MCH	POC	MOH	ROA	NAZ	LAG				
1989	Lola T89/00	Judd AV	(United States) Scott Pruett	3	11	DNS	10	5	2	5	6	3	6	17	8	19	8	6	4			8th	101
1990					PHX	LBH	INDY	MIL	DET	POR	CLE	MEA	TOR	MCH	DEN	VAN	MOH	ROA	NAZ	LAG			
1990	Lola T89/00	Judd AV	(Brazil) Raul Boesel	8	18	8		6	6	18	20	13	10	9	28	19	9	10	8	11		12th	42
1990	Lola T89/00	Judd AV	(Brazil) Raul Boesel	19			28															12th	42
1990	Lola T89/00	Judd AV	(Australia) Geoff Brabham	21			19															41st	0
1991					SFR	LBH	PHX	INDY	MIL	DET	POR	CLE	MEA	TOR	MCH	DEN	VAN	MOH	ROA	NAZ	LAG		
1991	Truesports 91C	Judd AV	(United States) Scott Pruett	11	5	24	12		13	17	8	23	17	4	13	5	5	4	17	18	7	10th	67
1991	Truesports 91C	Judd AV	(United States) Scott Pruett	19				12														10th	67
1991	Truesports 91C	Judd AV	(Australia) Geoff Brabham	21				20														44th	0
1992					SFR	PHX	LBH	INDY	DET	POR	MIL	NHA	TOR	MCH	CLE	ROA	VAN	MOH	NAZ	LAG			
1992	Truesports 92C	Chevrolet 265A	(United States) Scott Pruett	10	18	7	9	30	19	10	11	6	25	5	7	9	4	9	10	14		11th	62

== IndyCar wins ==
#	Season	Date	Sanction	Track / Race	No.	Winning driver	Chassis	Engine	Tire	Grid	Laps Led
1	1982	July 4	CART	Grand Prix of Cleveland (A)	19	(United States) Bobby Rahal (R)	March 82C	Cosworth DFX V8t	Goodyear	2	26
2	1982	September 26	CART	Michigan International Speedway (O)	19	(United States) Bobby Rahal (R) (2)	March 82C	Cosworth DFX V8t	Goodyear	5	29
3	1983	August 29	CART	Riverside International Raceway (R)	2	(United States) Bobby Rahal (3)	March 83C	Cosworth DFX V8t	Goodyear	4	21
4	1984	October 14	CART	Phoenix International Raceway (O)	5	(United States) Bobby Rahal (4)	March 84C	Cosworth DFX V8t	Goodyear	2	75
5	1984	October 21	CART	Laguna Seca Raceway (R)	5	(United States) Bobby Rahal (5)	March 84C	Cosworth DFX V8t	Goodyear	2	74
6	1985	September 1	CART	Mid-Ohio Sports Car Course (R)	3	(United States) Bobby Rahal (6)	March 85C	Cosworth DFX V8t	Goodyear	Pole	83
7	1985	September 22	CART	Michigan International Speedway (O)	3	(United States) Bobby Rahal (7)	March 85C	Cosworth DFX V8t	Goodyear	Pole	70
8	1985	October 6	CART	Laguna Seca Raceway (R)	3	(United States) Bobby Rahal (8)	March 85C	Cosworth DFX V8t	Goodyear	Pole	70
9	1986	May 31	USAC	Indianapolis 500 (O)	3	(United States) Bobby Rahal (9)	March 86C	Cosworth DFX V8t	Goodyear	4	58
10	1986	July 20	CART	Streets of Toronto (S)	3	(United States) Bobby Rahal (10)	March 86C	Cosworth DFX V8t	Goodyear	2	15
11	1986	August 31	CART	Mid-Ohio Sports Car Course (R)	3	(United States) Bobby Rahal (11)	March 86C	Cosworth DFX V8t	Goodyear	4	10
12	1986	September 7	CART	Sanair Super Speedway (O)	3	(United States) Bobby Rahal (12)	March 86C	Cosworth DFX V8t	Goodyear	3	137
13	1986	September 28	CART	Michigan International Speedway (O)	3	(United States) Bobby Rahal (13)	March 86C	Cosworth DFX V8t	Goodyear	8	24
14	1986	October 12	CART	Laguna Seca Raceway (R)	3	(United States) Bobby Rahal (14)	March 86C	Cosworth DFX V8t	Goodyear	2	86
15	1987	June 14	CART	Portland International Raceway (R)	1	(United States) Bobby Rahal (15)	Lola T87/00	Cosworth DFX V8t	Goodyear	3	56
16	1987	June 28	CART	Meadowlands Street Circuit (S)	1	(United States) Bobby Rahal (15)	Lola T87/00	Cosworth DFX V8t	Goodyear	2	68
17	1987	October 11	CART	Laguna Seca Raceway (R)	1	(United States) Bobby Rahal (17)	Lola T87/00	Cosworth DFX V8t	Goodyear	3	31
NC	1987	October 31	CART	Tamiami Park, Miami (S)	1	(United States) Bobby Rahal	Lola T87/00	Cosworth DFX V8t	Goodyear	2	28
18	1988	August 21	CART	Pocono 500 (O)	1	(United States) Bobby Rahal (18)	Lola T88/00	Judd AV V8t	Goodyear	3	32
