= Indy Legends Charity Pro–Am race =

Annual auto race held in Speedway, Indiana, US

Indy Legends Charity Pro–Am

Sportscar Vintage Racing Association
- Venue: Indianapolis Motor Speedway
- Corporate sponsor: Racer magazine
- First race: 2014
- Duration: 45 minutes
- Most wins (driver): No multiple winners
- Most wins (team): No multiple winners
- Most wins (manufacturer): Chevrolet Corvette (4)

The Indy Legends Charity Pro–Am race is a vintage sports car race held at the Indianapolis Motor Speedway in Speedway, Indiana. The race takes place on the combined road course at the Speedway as part of the SVRA Brickyard Vintage Racing Invitational event weekend. The inaugural running occurred in 2014. Beginning in 2019, the race has been part of the Vintage Race of Champions (VROC) series.

The race is run on the newer, modified layout of the circuit previously used for the Formula One U.S. Grand Prix, and currently used by the IndyCar Series for the IndyCar Grand Prix. The event is contested as a pro–am, with each entry having two drivers. An amateur racing driver is paired with a former Indianapolis 500 or Brickyard 400 driver, and the two drivers share stints at their discretion, in the same fashion as endurance racing. The machines used in the race are from the SVRA "Group 6" class, which includes Corvettes, Camaros, Mustangs, and other selected big-bore production sports cars and sedans from 1963 to 1972.

The field for this race consists of as many as 34 cars, with a traditional 33-car field owing to Indianapolis 500 traditions, and a 34th entry, known as "Garage 34," also included. However, some years have had smaller fields. The event takes place in the summer, at some point after the Indianapolis 500. From 2016 to 2018 the event was scheduled for Father's Day weekend., but for 2019, the event moved to August. For 2020, the event was scheduled to move back to June, but was cancelled due to the COVID-19 pandemic. Proceeds from the event go to local charities.

== Brickyard Vintage Racing Invitational ==
The Indy Legends Charity Pro–Am is part of the Brickyard Vintage Racing Invitational event weekend, a vintage racing meet featuring as many as 500 race cars spanning twelve classes. The event and the Pro–Am, are sanctioned by the Sportscar Vintage Racing Association (SVRA). Nearly all of the events take place on the combined road course at the Indianapolis Motor Speedway, with the exception of an oval track exhibition featuring historic Indy roadsters and machines from the 1950s-1970s that was held from 2014 to 2018. Since 2017, the event has been held in conjunction with the modern SCCA Trans-Am Series, where the TA2 class race is the featured event. Spec Miata has also been part of the weekend in some years.

The Pro–Am takes place on Saturday, with practice sessions on Thursday and/or Friday.

== Race rules ==
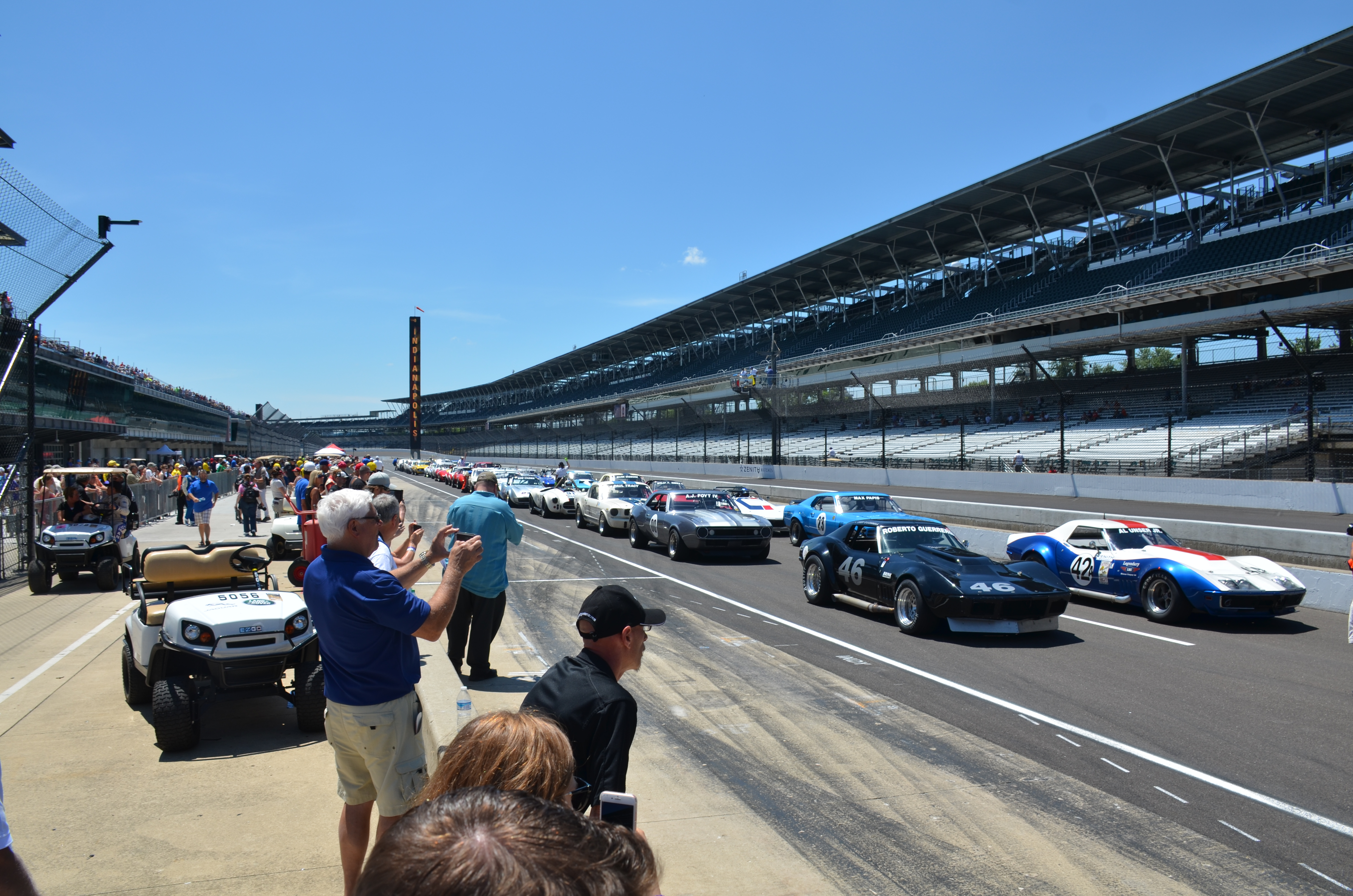
The starting grid for the 2016 Pro–Am race

- The cars must be models of the SVRA "Group 6" class, from 1963 to 1972, with a current preference and emphasis on domestic U.S. brands. Additional makes/models, including imports can be entered only at the officials discretion. The permitted cars include:
  - Chevrolet Corvette (C2) and early (C3) models.
  - First generation Chevrolet Camaro and early Second generation Camaros
  - Ford Mustang (including Boss 302), and Shelby Mustang
  - AC Cobra
- Each car is entered by an amateur driver. A former Indianapolis 500 driver is paired with each amateur, and the two drivers share driving duties during the race at their general discretion. In recent years, officials have expanded the Indianapolis driver status to include those who have participated in any oval race at the Speedway—the Freedom 100, Indiana 250, or Brickyard 400. Additional non-IMS oval drivers can and have been entered, under a "Promoter's Option" format, most notably Ron Fellows.
- The amateur drivers are required to start the race, and complete a minimum of three laps before turning the wheel over to the pro driver. Beginning in 2018, the car was required to be turned over to the pro driver no later than lap 10.
- Each entry is required to make a mandatory 5-minute pit stop. During the pit stop, the car can be refueled, the crew can change tires, make adjustments, or make repairs, and perform the driver switch. The pit stop can come at any time during the race, but must be timed such that both the amateur driver and the pro driver complete a minimum of three laps behind the wheel before the race is over.

== Race history ==
=== 2014 ===
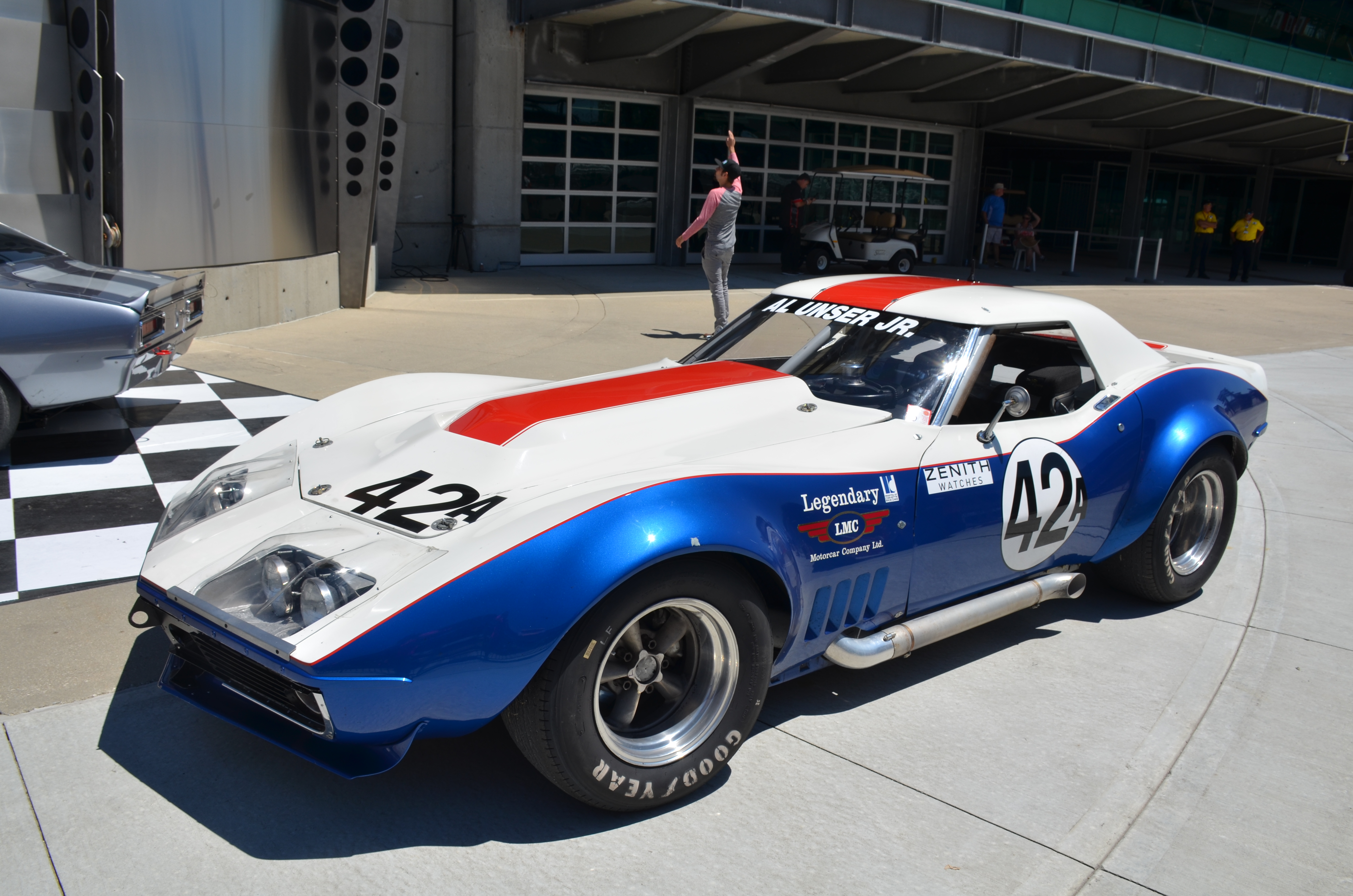
The car of Al Unser Jr. at the 2016 Pro–Am race

The inaugural Pro–Am was won by the team of Al Unser Jr. and Peter Klutt, driving a 1969 Chevrolet Corvette. Eliseo Salazar and Gary Moore finished second. Rounding out the podium in third place was Willy T. Ribbs & Ed Sevadjian. Klutt started the race in the #42C Corvette, then pitted during an early yellow to hand to car over to Unser, who drove to victory.

=== 2015 ===
The second annual Pro–Am was won by the team of Bob Lazier and Jim Caudle. Lazier finished 48.9 seconds ahead of the second place car, driven by Mark Dismore & Scott Hackenson. The team of Max Papis and Curt Vogt led the race early, but lost the lead when a caution came out during their pit stop. Papis crossed the line third, one second behind Dismore.

=== 2016 ===
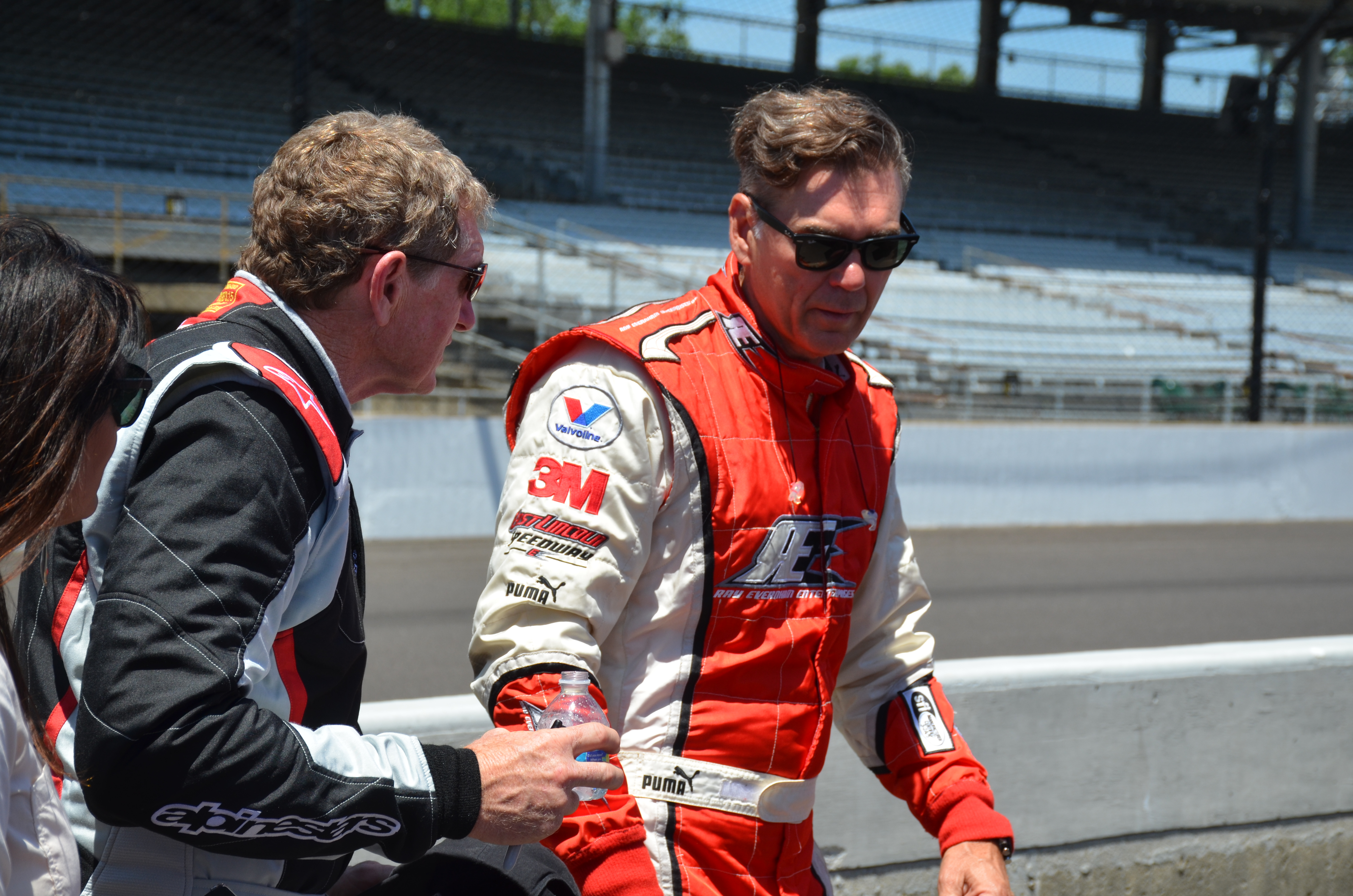
Ray Evernham and Bill Elliott at the 2016 Pro–Am

For 2016, the Pro–Am was slightly retooled into a two-class race. The entries were classified into two categories, A Production (AP) and B Production (BP), based primarily on engine displacement, and other performance criteria. Robby Unser and André Ahrlé drove a 1965 Cobra CompR to win the A Production class and the overall victory. Unser drove the second half of the race, and grabbed the lead on a restart, after a yellow due to a spin by Tom Bagley on lap 13.

In the B Production class, Paul Tracy and Gary Moore took the victory, and finished second overall, driving a 1965 Ford Mustang GT350 Tracy and Moore took the lead for good after Max Papis was black-flagged for a penalty. For Tracy, it was a long-awaited victory at the Brickyard after the controversial 2002 Indianapolis 500.

Former NASCAR champion and 2002 Brickyard 400 winner Bill Elliott teamed with co-driver Ray Evernham (himself a three-time winning crew chief at Indianapolis) to field the special "Garage 34" entry. The 34th car in the field was added as a gesture to the "Garage 56" concept at Le Mans. Evernham profiled the duo's efforts on his television program AmeriCARna on Velocity. The car dropped out early however, due to a broken driveshaft, before Elliott could take his stint behind the wheel.

=== 2017 ===
The 2017 Pro–Am was held Saturday June 17. The event was run as a two-class race, A Production (AP) and B Production (BP). Bobby Unser was named the event grand marshal. A full field of 34, consisting of 33 Indy 500 legend drivers, and a Garage 34 featuring a Brickyard 400 legend driver, were entered.

The car of Jody O'Donnell/Roberto Guerrero took the lead at the start and led the first seven laps. On lap 8, O'Donnell lost traction in turn one, and the car of Ed Sevadjian/Willy T. Ribbs slipped by for the lead. Sevadjian dominated the race over the next many laps, until pitting to hand the car over to Ribbs. Still out on the track, O'Donnell led once again, with the car of Rick Blaha/Sarah Fisher now in second. Ribbs came back out in third, but neither first place nor second place had pitted yet for the driver change. Ribbs was charging and set the fastest lap of the race (1:37.823), and effectively would become the leader once the pit stops were completed.

With Ribbs behind the wheel of the #36 Duntov 1969 Corvette, it appeared he was in position to drive to victory. Second place Rick Blaha pitted and handed the car over to Sarah Fisher. Furthermore, race leader Jody O'Donnell in the #46A Corvette never pitted, and he and Roberto Guerrero were disqualified. Willy T. Ribbs re-took the lead but with just minutes left in the race, the engine threw a rod and came to a stop out on the track. Sarah Fisher benefited greatly from the resulting full-course caution, and was able to complete the team's driver switch under the yellow. Fisher drove to victory, winning by a full lap over the car of Peter Klutt/Al Unser Jr. Fisher became the first female driver to win an automobile race of any kind at the Indianapolis Motor Speedway.

In the "B" Production, the car of Curt Vogt/Max Papis was the class winner, finishing third overall. After suffering a broken driveshaft in the 2016 race, the team of Ray Evernham & Bill Elliott finished third in the "A" production class and fourth overall. The #3 Camaro of Sam LeComte/Jaques Lazier threw a rod as it was being driven the grid, and the team scrambled to find a back-up car. Jaques Lazier instead took over the seat of Bob Lazier and co-drove with Jim Caudle. Jaques Lazier drive the #27 Corvette to a third-place finish in the "B" class, but was disqualified in the post-race when officials determined he passed cars during the caution.

=== 2018 ===
The fifth annual Pro–Am race was held Saturday June 16. On a sweltering hot, 94 degree afternoon, track conditions were difficult. Several drivers were affected by the heat, while handling problems and braking issues were experienced throughout the field. Father and son swept the front row, as the car of Matt Brabham/Michael Donohue qualified for pole position, and Geoff Brabham/Jody O'Donnell started second. At the start, however, the Matt Brabham/Donohue car lost the lead to the car of Geoff Brabham/O'Donnell. However, that car dropped out after only 8 laps due to a rear suspension failure. The Corvette of Willy T. Ribbs/Jim Kitzmiller took the lead and dominated the middle parts of the race. However, Ribbs blew a differential on lap 14, the second year in a row dropping out while leading.

The car of Jimmy Kite/Peter Klutt came to the lead, and appeared on their way to victory. However, Matt Brabham had climbed behind the wheel of his entry and began charging through the field. Brabham came upon second place Max Papis, who was driving an incredible race with essentially no brakes. Brabham worked his way by Papis, and set his sights on the leader. Jimmy Kite's car had failing brakes, and Brabham got by in the final few minutes. B Production Class entries swept the top three overall positions, with Matt Brabham/Michael Donohue winning, Max Papis/Curt Vogt second, and Ray Evernham/Bill Elliott third. The top A Production Class finisher was Kite/Klutt in 4th place overall.

Only 23 cars started the race, down from previous years. Two Pro rookies were entered, including sports car legend Ron Fellows, but his car only completed 1 lap in the race. The lone Indy Legends rookie was Matt Brabham, also the overall winner.

=== 2019 ===
For 2019, the race moved from June to the first weekend in August, the weekend once used for the Brickyard 400. The race also became part of the new Vintage Race of Champions (VROC) series, a three-race pro–am championship with events at Road Atlanta, Indianapolis, and VIR. Indy 500 veteran, and Indy Pro–Am veteran Dick Simon was named the grand marshal. Race "rookies" entered include Johnny Rutherford, as well as Brickyard 400 veterans Bobby Labonte (2000 winner), Mike Skinner, Johnny Benson, Todd Bodine, Boris Said.

The Corvette of Geoff Brabham/Peter Klutt started on the pole and took the lead at the start. Running second in the early stages was the Corvette of Willy T. Ribbs/Ed Sevadjian. With Sevadjian behind the wheel, he caught up to Klutt and took the lead just before both cars made their mandatory pit stop and driver change. Ribbs led for the next twelve laps, until Brabham caught up and took the lead with a pass going into turn one. On lap 19, however, the Brabham/Klutt car broke an engine belt, and it lost the power steering. Brabham was forced to park the car in the pits.

The Ribbs/Sevadjian car took the top spot back, and pulled out to a two-second lead over the car of Bobby Labonte/Gary Klutt. With ten minutes remaining, Roberto Guerrero spun in turn one, bringing out a full-course caution. The field bunched up for a late restart. Ribbs got the jump on the restart, and immediately pulled away to a 2-second lead. Lyn St. James suffered a hard crash in turn 14, bringing out another full-course yellow, and the race finished under caution. After dominating the race the two previous years, and both times dropping out with mechanical problems, Willy T. Ribbs was finally victorious in the Indy Legends Charity Pro–Am. The car of Labonte/Klutt finished second, and the car of Boris Said/Jim Caudle won the B Production class, finishing third overall.

=== 2020–2023 ===
In 2020, the race was cancelled due to the COVID-19 pandemic, as were numerous events on the SVRA schedule. The Brickyard Vintage Invitational event was not held in 2021 either, presumably again for COVID-19 protocols.

For 2022, SVRA returned to the Indianapolis Motor Speedway after a two-year hiatus. The 2022 "Indy Speed Tour", which was also held in partnership with the Vintage Indy Registry, was moved back to the familiar Fathers Day weekend date. However, the Pro-Am race was not part of the festivities. SVRA returned for Fathers Day weekend in 2023, but again, the Pro-am was not held.

== Race results ==
=== Overall winners ===
Year	Date	Winning Driver	Car	Race Distance		Time of Race	Winning Speed	Report
Year	Date	Winning Driver	Car	Miles	Laps	Time of Race	Winning Speed	Report
2014	June 8	(United States) Al Unser Jr. (Canada) Peter Klutt	1969 Chevrolet Corvette	21	51.2	45:00	67.323 mph	Report
2015	June 13	(United States) Bob Lazier (United States) Jim Caudle	1969 Chevrolet Corvette	20	48.8	40:00	70.325 mph	Report
2016	June 18	(United States) Robby Unser (Germany) André Ahrlé	1965 Cobra CompR	25	60.8	45:00	70.616 mph	Report
2017	June 17	(United States) Sarah Fisher (United States) Kirk Blaha	1969 Chevrolet Corvette	24	58.4	45:00	68.566 mph	Report
2018	June 16	(Australia) Matthew Brabham (United States) Michael Donohue	1963 Chevrolet Corvette (B Production)	27	65.6	45:00	76.749 mph	Report
2019	August 3	(United States) Willy T. Ribbs (United States) Ed Sevadjian	1969 Chevrolet Corvette	25	60.8	50:00		Report

- All overall winners are A Production class entries unless otherwise noted.

=== B Production class winners ===
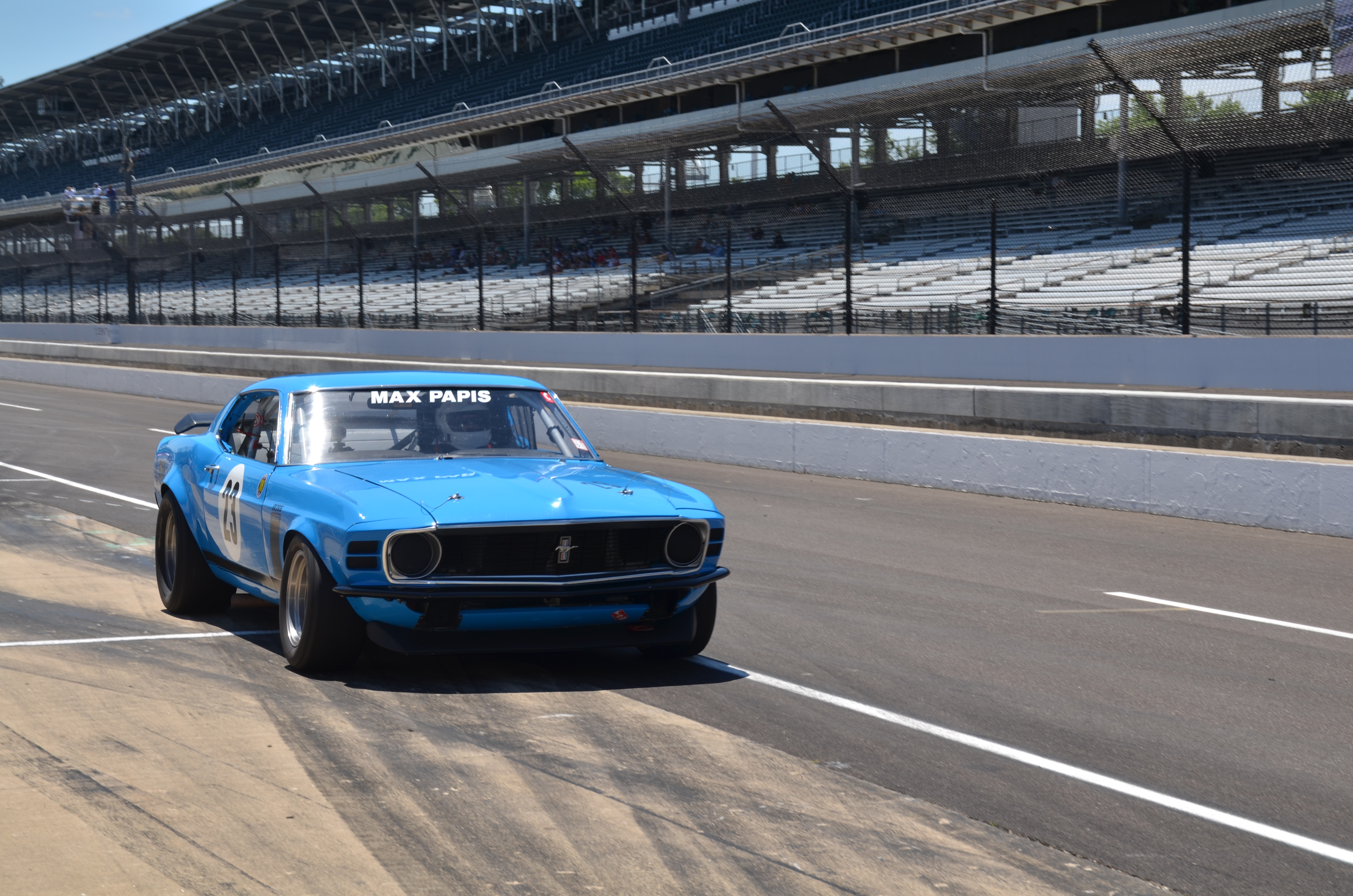
Max Papis at the 2016 Pro–Am

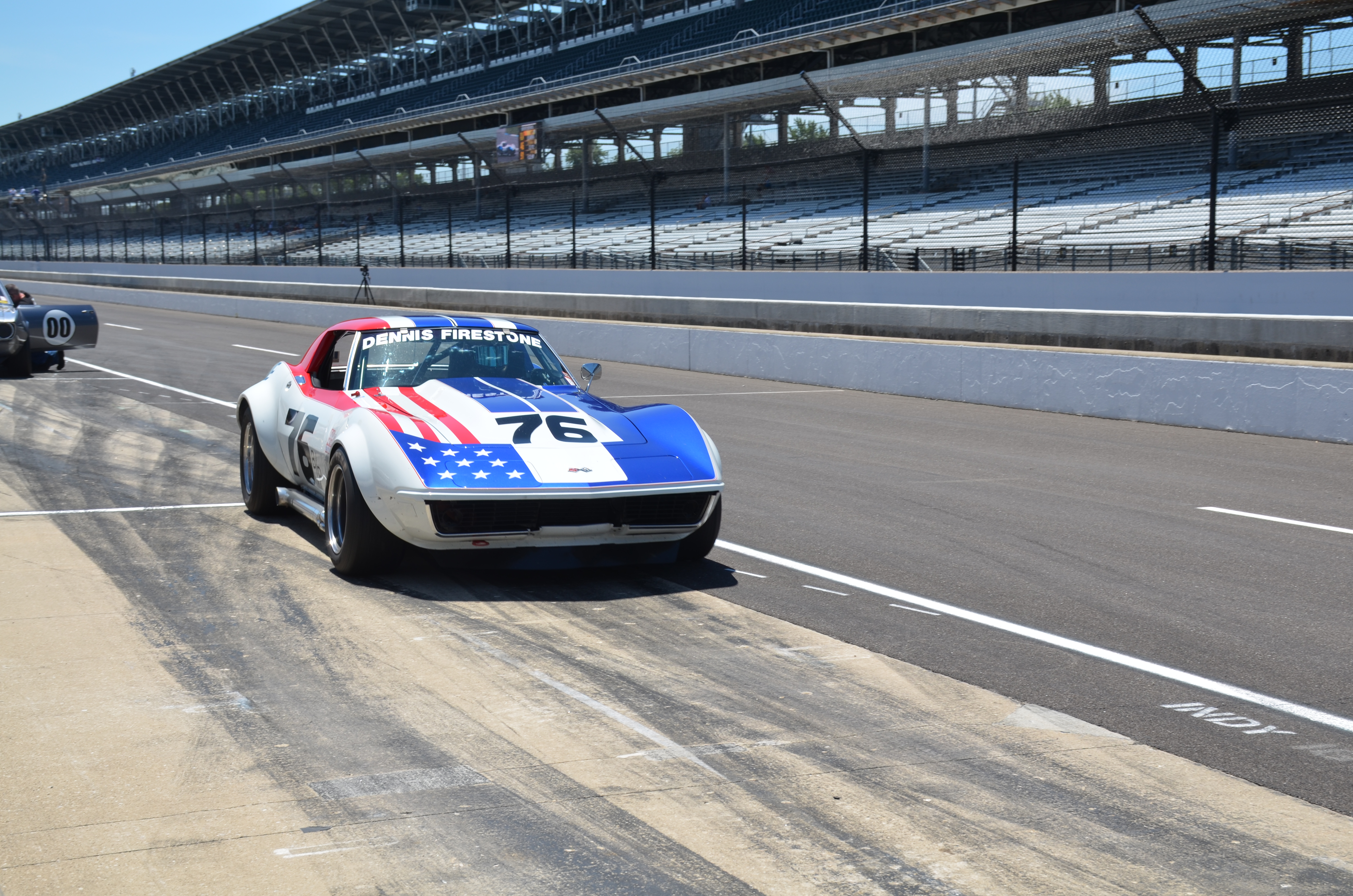
Dennis Firestone at the 2016 Pro–Am

Year	Winning Driver	Car	Race Distance	
Year	Winning Driver	Car	Miles	Laps
2016	(Canada) Paul Tracy (Canada) Gary Moore	1965 Ford Mustang GT350	25	60.8
2017	(Italy) Max Papis (United States) Curt Vogt	1970 Ford Boss 302 Mustang	23	55.9
2018	(Australia) Matthew Brabham (United States) Michael Donohue	1963 Chevrolet Corvette	27	65.6
2019	(United States) Boris Said (United States) Jim Caudle	1967 Ford Mustang	25	60.8

- In 2018, for the first time, the overall winner was a B Production class entry. The highest finishing A Production entry was Gary Klutt/Jimmy Kite (4th overall)

=== Event grand marshals ===
Year	Grand marshal	Honorary chief stewards
2014	Parnelli Jones	
2015	Al Unser Sr.	Tom Sneva & Janet Guthrie
2016	Donald Davidson	Bill Vukovich II
2017	Bobby Unser	
2018	Johnny Rutherford	Bobby Unser
2019	Dick Simon	

== Drivers ==
The former Indy/Brickyard "legend" drivers that have competed in the Pro–Am include:

- Ana Beatriz
- Éric Bachelart
- Tom Bagley
- Donnie Beechler
- Johnny Benson
- Todd Bodine
- Geoff Brabham
- Matthew Brabham
- Tyce Carlson
- P. J. Chesson
- Wally Dallenbach Jr.
- Mark Dismore
- Bill Elliott
- Sarah Fisher
- Dennis Firestone
- A. J. Foyt IV
- Larry Foyt
- Josele Garza
- Spike Gehlhausen
- Scott Goodyear
- Stephan Gregoire
- Roberto Guerrero
- Pete Halsmer
- Davey Hamilton
- Scott Harrington
- Richie Hearn
- Davy Jones
- Jimmy Kite
- Bobby Labonte
- Bob Lazier
- Buddy Lazier
- Jaques Lazier
- Alex Lloyd
- Arie Luyendyk Jr.
- Darren Manning
- John Martin
- Robby McGehee
- Rocky Moran
- Max Papis
- Johnny Parsons
- Billy Roe
- Willy T. Ribbs
- Johnny Rutherford
- Boris Said
- Eliseo Salazar
- Dick Simon
- Mike Skinner
- Lyn St. James
- Paul Tracy
- Rick Treadway
- Al Unser
- Al Unser Jr.
- Johnny Unser
- Robby Unser
- Jimmy Vasser
- Cory Witherill

Non-IMS oval drivers that have competed include:

- Ron Fellows

Notable amateur drivers that have competed include:

- André Ahrlé
- Ray Evernham

=== Gallery ===
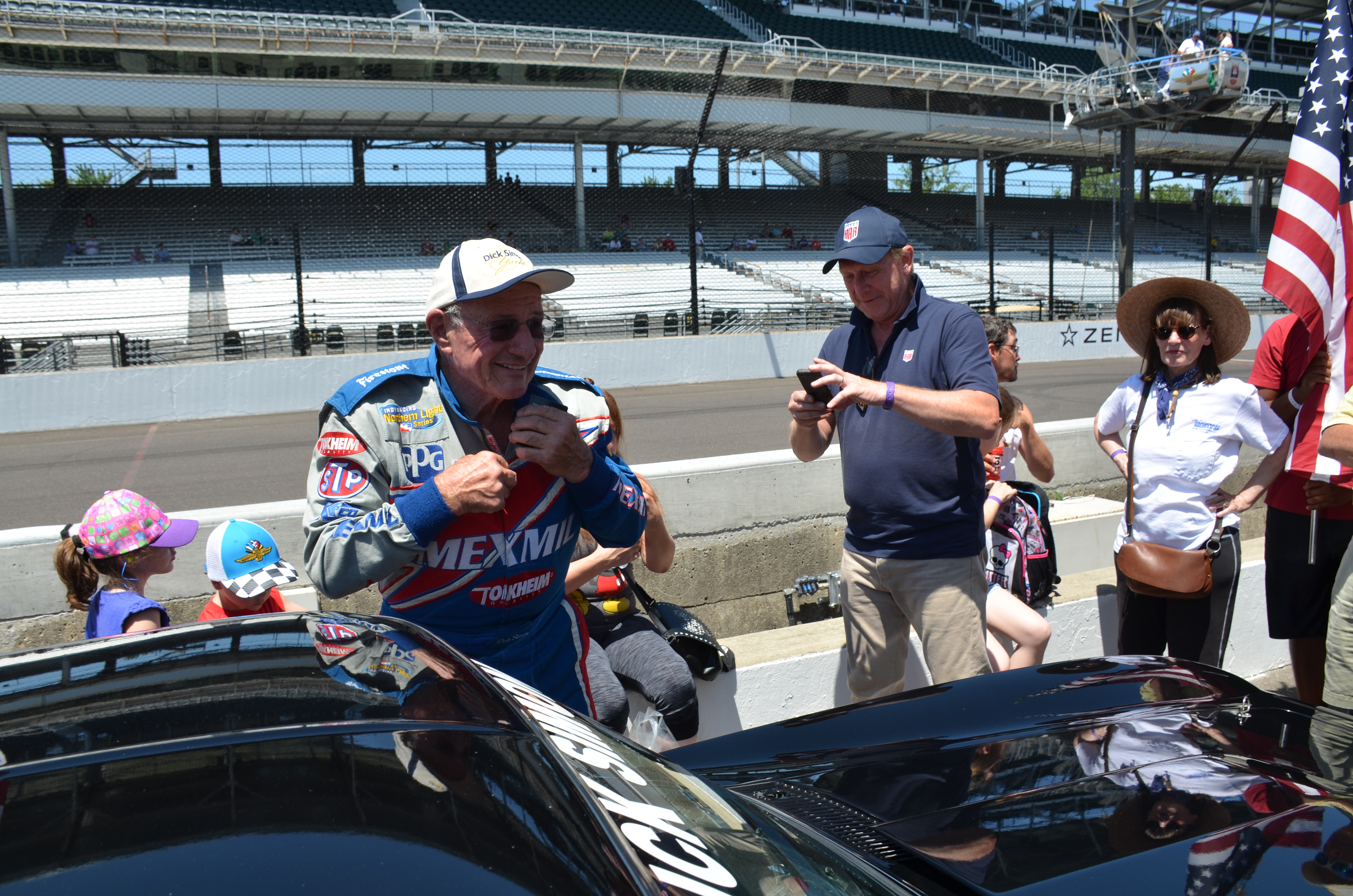
Dick Simon at the 2016 Pro–Am

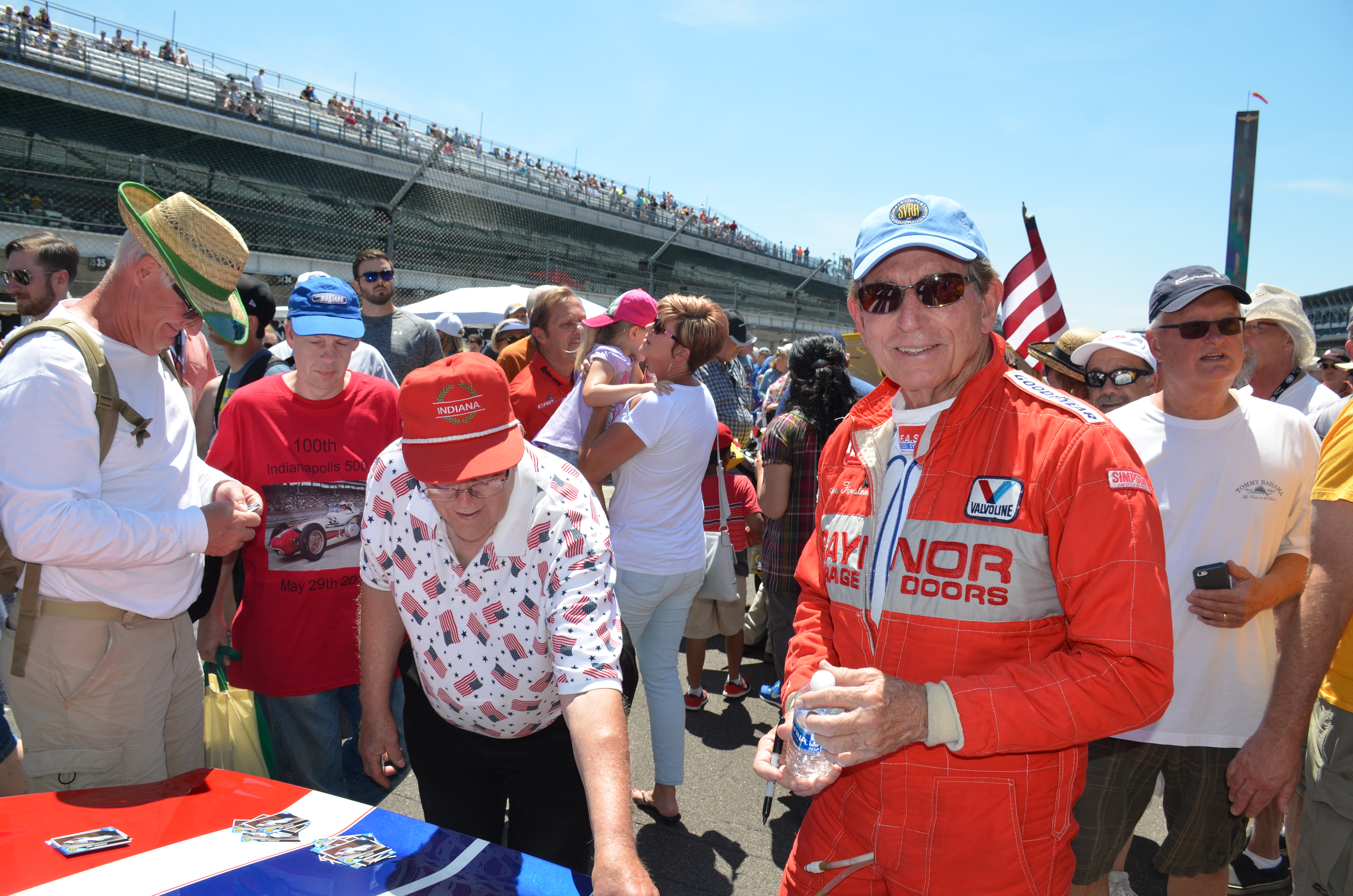
Dennis Firestone at the 2016 Pro–Am

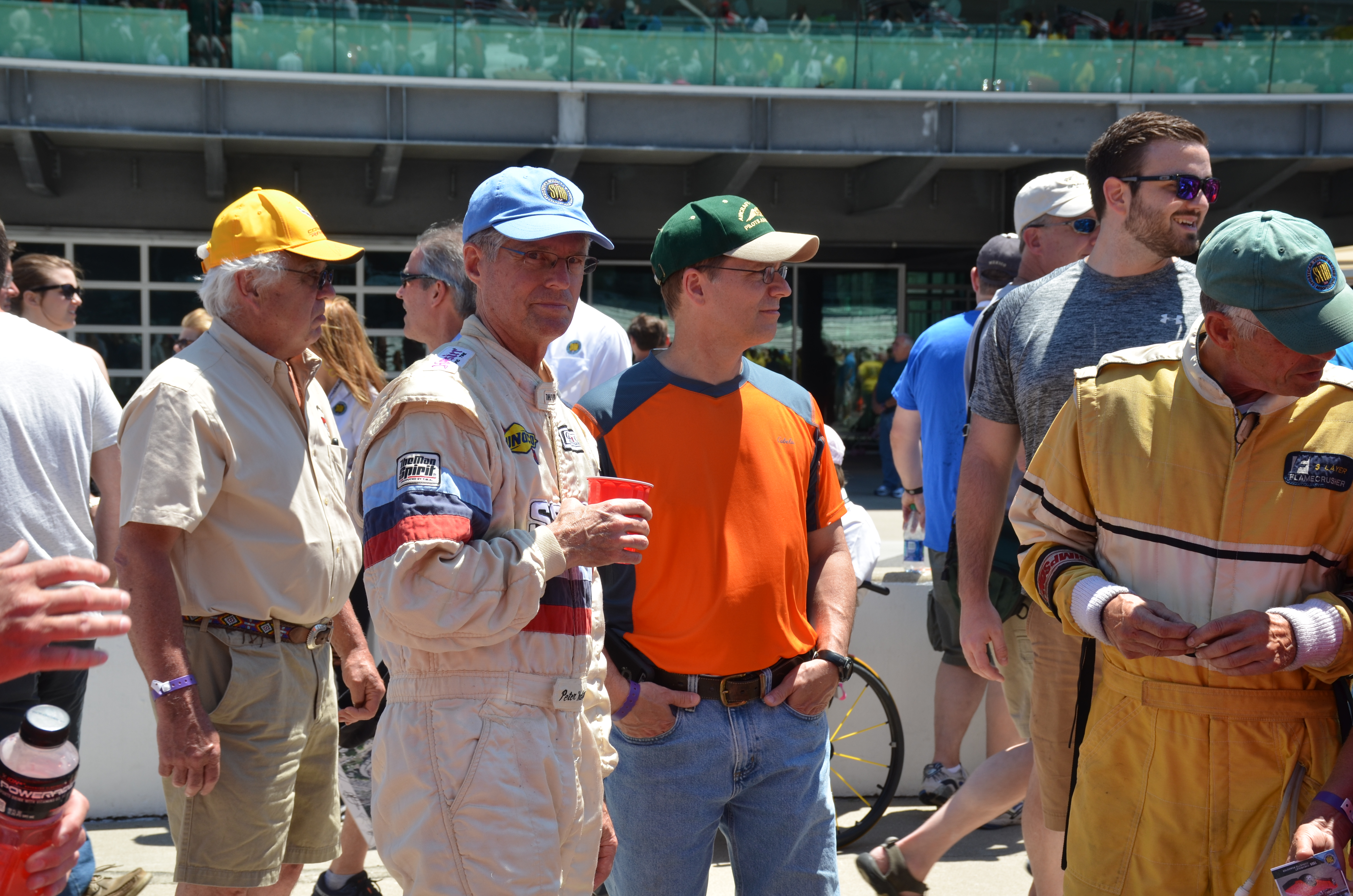
Pete Halsmer at the 2016 Pro–Am

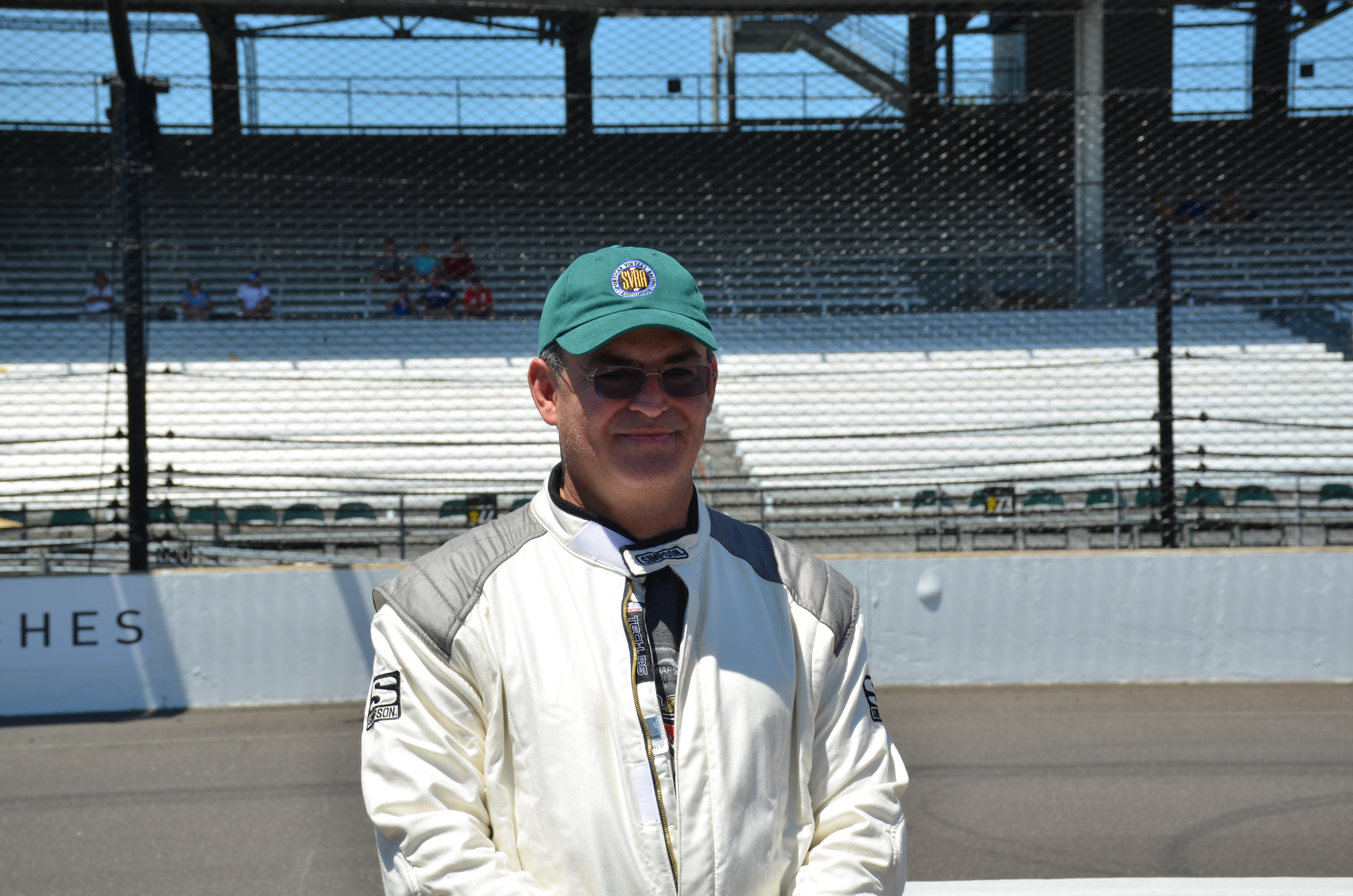
Josele Garza at the 2016 Pro–Am

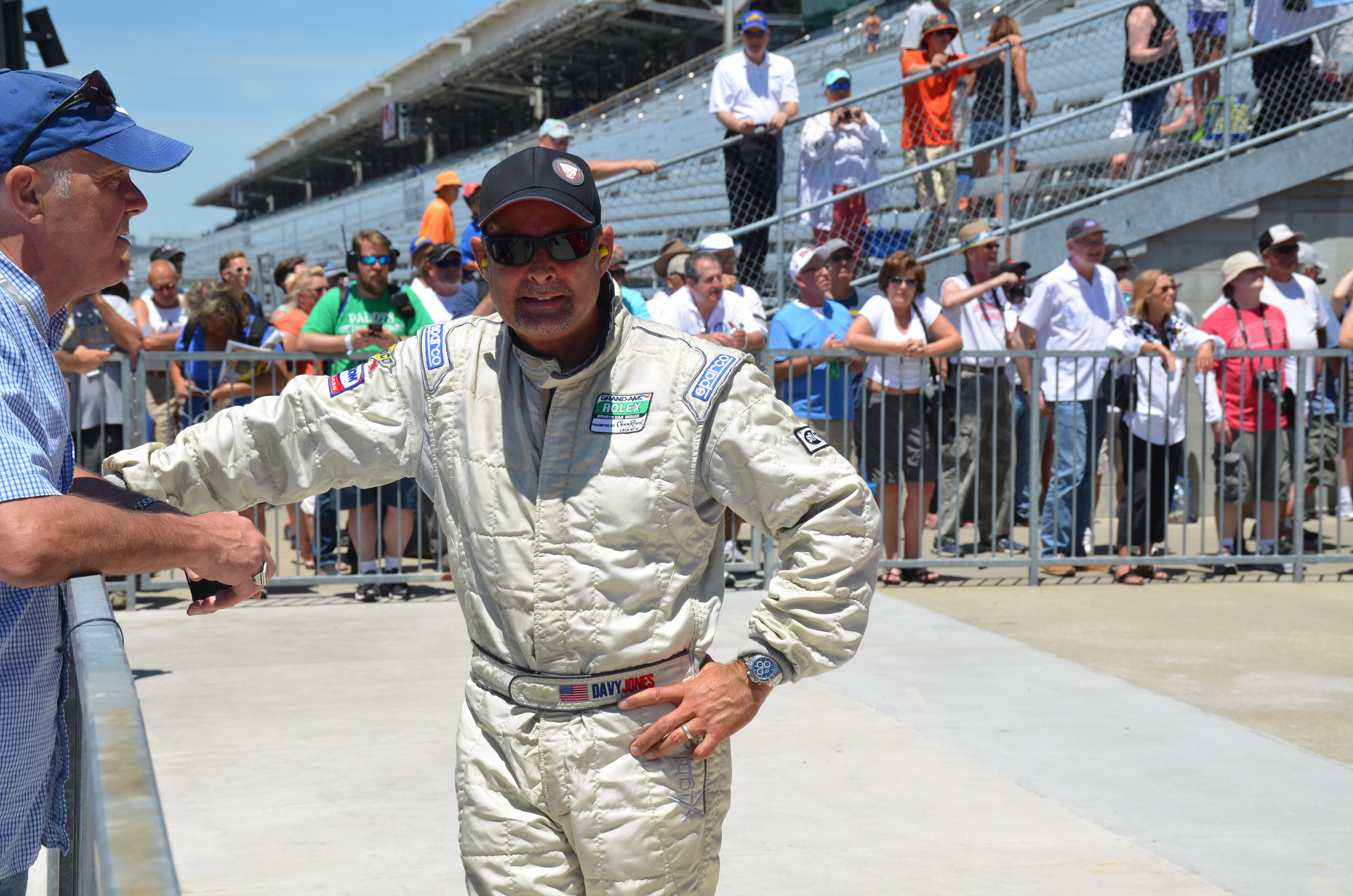
Davy Jones at the 2016 Pro–Am
