= Rick Treadway =

American racing driver (1970–2026)

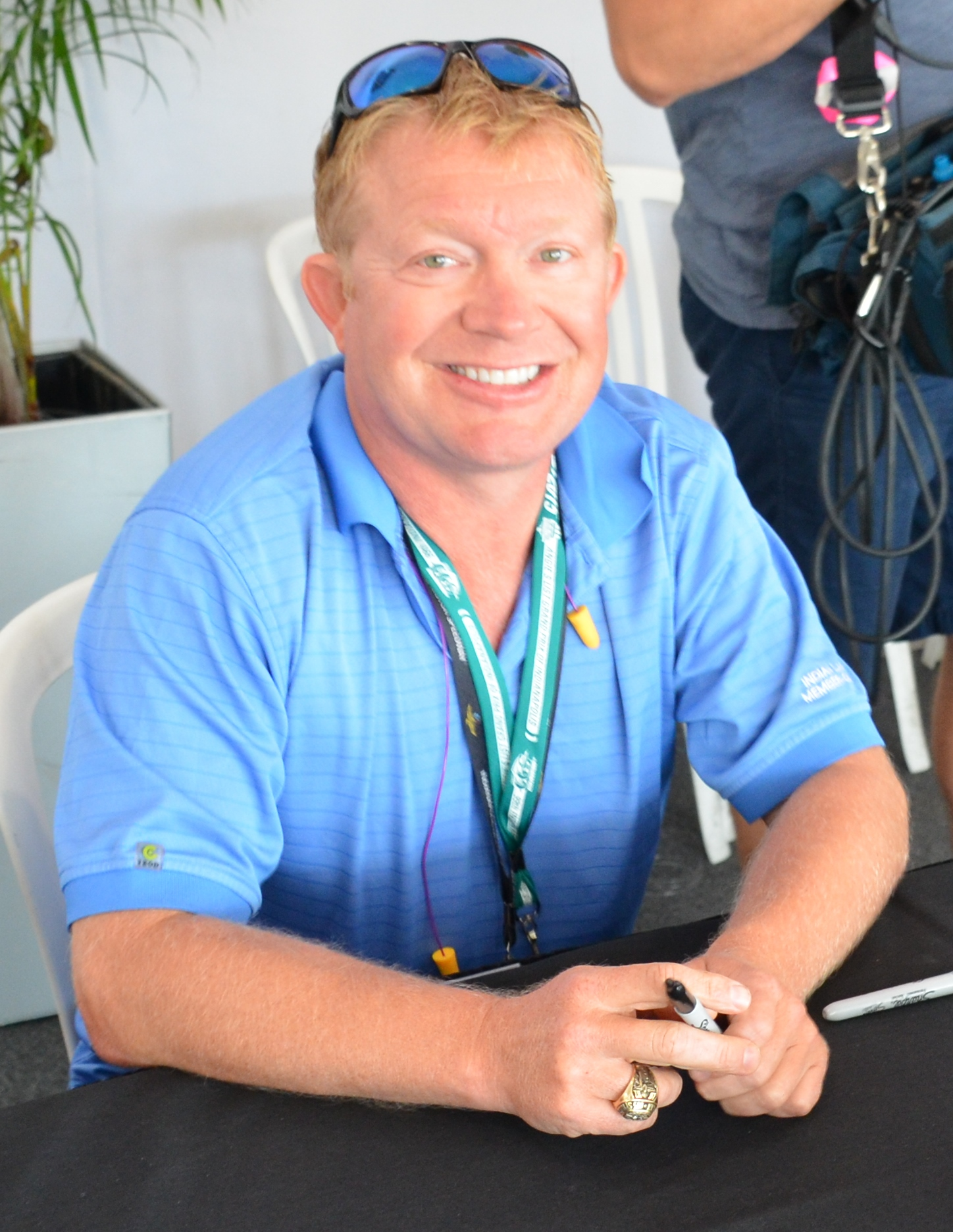
Treadway at the 2015 Indianapolis 500

Richard B. Treadway (January 15, 1970 – May 30, 2026) was an American racing driver in the Indy Racing League. He raced in the 2001 and 2002 seasons with eleven career starts, including the 2002 Indianapolis 500.

Treadway was the son of Fred Treadway, owner of Treadway Racing, the team which won the 1997 Indianapolis 500. In 2014–2018, he competed in the Indy Legends Charity Pro–Am race, with a best finish of 6th in 2014.

Treadway was a graduate of Indiana State University. After racing, Treadway worked in both business development and as a commercial pilot for his own charter air service. He later worked as a flight instructor.

Treadway died in a motorcycle collision on May 30, 2026, at the age of 56.

== Racing record ==
=== American Open Wheel ===
(key)

==== IndyCar results ====
Year	Team	1	2	3	4	5	6	7	8	9	10	11	12	13	14	15	Rank	Points	Ref
2001	Treadway-Hubbard Racing	PHX	HMS	ATL	INDY	TXS	PPI	RIR	KAN	NSH	KTY; 17	STL	CHI; 14	TX2; 5			25th	59	
2002	Treadway Racing	HMS; 24	PHX; 9	FON; 22	NZR; 16	INDY; 29	TXS; 23	PPI	RIR	KAN; 23	NSH	MIS	KTY	STL	CHI	TX2; 19	28th	76	
