= 2002 Indianapolis 500 =

American motor race

86th Indianapolis 500

Indianapolis Motor Speedway

Indianapolis 500
- Sanctioning body: Indy Racing League
- Season: 2002 IRL season
- Date: May 26, 2002
- Winner: (Brazil) Hélio Castroneves
- Winning team: Penske Racing
- Winning Chief Mechanic: Rick Rinaman
- Time of race: 3:00:10.8714
- Average speed: 166.499 mph (268 km/h)
- Pole position: (Brazil) Bruno Junqueira
- Pole speed: 231.342 mph (372 km/h)
- Fastest qualifier: (Brazil) Bruno Junqueira
- Rookie of the Year: (United States) Alex Barron (South Africa) Tomas Scheckter
- Most laps led: (South Africa) Tomas Scheckter (85)

Pre-race ceremonies
- National anthem: Josephine Holmon (West Point cadet)
- "Back Home Again in Indiana": Jim Nabors
- Starting command: Mari Hulman George
- Pace car: Chevrolet Corvette
- Pace car driver: James Caviezel
- Starter: Bryan Howard
- Estimated attendance: 400,000

Television in the United States
- Network: ABC
- Announcers: Paul Page, Scott Goodyear
- Nielsen ratings: 5.3 / 15

Chronology
Previous	Next
2001	2003

The 86th Indianapolis 500 was held at the Indianapolis Motor Speedway in Speedway, Indiana on Sunday, May 26, 2002. It was part of the 2002 Indy Racing League season. Rookie Tomas Scheckter led 85 laps, and appeared on his way to a possible victory, which would have marked the third consecutive Indy win for a first-year driver. However, Scheckter crashed on the front stretch while leading with only 27 laps to go. Hélio Castroneves (who also won the 2001 running) became the fifth driver in Indy 500 history to win back-to-back races. It was the second of his four Indy 500 victories. Castroneves became the first repeat winner since Al Unser Sr. (1970–1971). There would not be another repeat winner until Josef Newgarden in 2023–2024.

The 2002 race is largely considered one of the most controversial races in Indy history. On the 199th lap, second place Paul Tracy was alongside leader Hélio Castroneves, going for the lead in the third turn. At the same time, a crash occurred on another part of the track, bringing out the caution flag. Indy Racing League officials ruled that the yellow came out before Tracy completed the pass, and Castroneves was declared the victor. After an official protest was filed, and after an appeals hearing, Castroneves' victory was upheld on July 2, 2002.

About 7.46 inches of rain fell during the month of May, considerably interrupting the on-track activities. The second day of time trials was completely washed out, while Bump Day was cut short due to rain. Likewise, six of the ten practice days were either delayed by moisture or halted due to rain showers. Uncomfortably cold temperatures also were observed during most of the month. Private testing and rookie orientation in April was also hampered several times due to rain and cold temperatures. Race day, however, was sunny, warm, and clear.

== Race background ==
The Indianapolis 500, commonly shortened to the Indy 500, is an annual race held at the Indianapolis Motor Speedway, a four-turn, 2.5 mi (4.0 km) asphalt oval circuit, in Speedway, an enclave suburb of Indianapolis, Indiana, United States. The event is contested by "Indy cars", a formula of professional-level, single-seat, open cockpit, open-wheel, purpose-built race cars. Since its inaugural running in 1911, the Indianapolis 500 has become a staple of Memorial Day weekend and one of, if not the, most prestigious races in motorsports.

During early March 2002, the asphalt pavement at the Indianapolis Motor Speedway underwent a diamond grinding in an effort to smooth out several bumps, providing cars with additional grip and reducing downforce disruption from bumps. The track repaving along with aerodynamic body modifications and tire advancements resulted in faster speeds. In April, the new Steel and Foam Energy Reduction (SAFER) barrier made of concrete and steel with pink foam to absorb vehicluar impacts was retrofitted to the 4,240 ft (1,290 m) of permanent retaining walls in the outside turns at the Speedway in order to improve driver safety; only the four turns received SAFER walls due to time constraints. It marked the first installation of the revolutionary-new energy-absorbing technology at an American superspeedway.

=== Rule changes ===
Starting from the 2002 race, all pit crew members that work over the wall were required to wear approved helmets. This requirement was in response to a succession of accidents and injuries (particularly head injuries) involving pit crew members in multiple motorsports series. Several pit crews in the series had already been utilizing optional helmets since approximately 1999, after Steve Fried, Robby McGehee's crew chief, was seriously injured in a pit road accident. The accident put Freid in a coma for several weeks. The pit road speed limit was reduced to 60 mph (97 km/h).

The standardized font car numbers (black numerals on a white box) used from 1999 to 2001 were scrapped. Teams were permitted to utilize any color/font for car numbers decals, provided they were sufficiently visible. Car number decal placement locations were also adjusted. The required car number locations were to be one on the nose, and one on each of the rear wing vertical panels on both the left and right.

=== 2002 Indy Racing League ===
The Indianapolis 500 was the fifth round of 15 in the 2002 Indy Racing League, and the 86th running of the event. Panther Racing driver Sam Hornish Jr. led the Drivers' Championship going into the race, having scored 154 points and two wins in the first four races of the season. Team Penske teammates Gil de Ferran and Hélio Castroneves trailed Hornish by five and nine points, respectively. Felipe Giaffone, with 105 points, and Scott Sharp, with 98 points, were respectively in the fourth and fifth positions.

== Race schedule ==
Race schedule – April 2002
Sun	Mon	Tue	Wed	Thu	Fri	Sat
7	8 Testing	9 Testing	10	11	12; ROP	13; ROP
14	15	16; Testing	17; Testing	18	19	20
Race schedule – May 2002
			1	2	3	4 Mini-Marathon
5 Practice	6 Practice	7 Practice	8 Practice	9 Practice	10; Practice	11; Pole Day
12; Time Trials	13	14	15; Practice	16; Practice	17; Practice	18; Practice
19; Bump Day	20	21	22	23; Carb Day	24	25; Parade
26; Indy 500	27; Memorial Day	28	29	30	31	

Color	Notes
Green	Practice
Dark Blue	Time trials
Silver	Race day
Red	Rained out*
Blank	No track activity

* Includes days where track activity
was significantly limited due to rain

ROP – denotes Rookie Orientation Program

== Entry list ==
The official entry list for the 2002 Indianapolis 500 was released on April 9, 2002. Entry invitations were mailed to eligible race teams on February 22, and the deadline was set for April 3. Drivers from Championship Auto Racing Teams (CART), Formula One, NASCAR, the Sports Car Club of America, the United States Auto Club and racers through the Fédération Internationale de l'Automobile listings were eligible to compete. Eighty-nine cars for 46 entries were featured on the entry list, with 37 drivers being named to the entries. Among the drivers entered were six former winners of the race and 11 race rookies. Most drivers came from the United States, while others came from countries such as Brazil, Canada, England, Italy, Japan, the Netherlands, Scotland, South Africa and Sweden. Each car was fitted with Firestone tires. Dallara and G-Force Technologies were the chassis providers, and Chevrolet and Infiniti were the engine suppliers.

=== Team and driver changes ===
Team Penske left CART at the conclusion of the 2001 season and moved to the IRL full-time with Castroneves and De Ferran. Team Green filed two entries for the race, which were to be driven by race rookie Dario Franchitti and Paul Tracy, who returned to the race for the first time in seven years. The team later added Michael Andretti for the second consecutive Indianapolis 500. Chip Ganassi Racing (CGR) filed three entries for the event, with the cars driven by Kenny Bräck, Bruno Junqueira, and Jeff Ward. Team Rahal filed its first entry to the race since the CART–IRL split in 1996, fielding 1996 CART champion Jimmy Vasser.

Two-time Indianapolis 500 winner Arie Luyendyk also signed to drive at Indianapolis for the second successive year with Treadway Racing. Three-time Formula One Grand Prix winner Johnny Herbert joined Duesenberg Brothers Racing in an attempt to make his Indianapolis 500 debut, but later withdrew to honor an commitment with Audi in the American Le Mans Series race in California. Herbert was replaced by Memo Gidley. Cheever Racing added a third entry to be driven by IRL debutant Max Papis. P. J. Jones signed for Team Menard as the temporary replacement for the injured Jaques Lazier, Oriol Servià was hired by team owner Derrick Walker to drive the Walker Racing-prepared No. 15 car, Tony Kanaan attempted to debut at the race with Mo Nunn Racing, and 1999 Indy Racing League champion Greg Ray was signed to drive for A. J. Foyt Racing beginning at the Indianapolis 500 as the replacement for the injured Eliseo Salazar.

Sarah Fisher returned to Dreyer & Reinbold Racing as teammate to Robbie Buhl after filling in for Buhl at the preceding Firestone Indy 225. Mark Dismore committed to driving with Sam Schmidt Motorsports over Cheever Racing at Indianapolis. International Kart Federation champion George Mack attempted to become the second African American driver after Willy T. Ribbs to qualify for the race. Donnie Beechler accepted an offer from A. J. Foyt to drive a third entry for Foyt's eponymous team. Anthony Lazzaro was fired on the morning of May 17, and his team Sam Schmidt Motorsports/PDM Racing opted to replace him with Jimmy Kite after contacting him. Scott Harrington and John de Vries shared Brayton Racing's car until De Vries was replaced by Harrington.

Robby Gordon attempted "double duty" for the third time competing in the Indianapolis 500 and Coca-Cola 600 on the same day with the consent of his team Richard Childress Racing. Tony Stewart, who attempted the feat in 1999 and 2001, opted not to do so in 2002, opting to focus on NASCAR and on attempting to secure the series title. NASCAR driver John Andretti was not allowed to attempt double duty by his superiors at Petty Enterprises, who wanted him to focus on the Coca-Cola 600.

== Testing and Rookie Orientation ==
The Rookie Orientation and Refresher Programs was set to be held at Indianapolis on April 12 and April 13. Rookie Orientation consists of four phases; the first phase features speeds between 200 and 205 mph (322 and 330 km/h), the second phase features speeds between 205 and 210 mph (330 and 338 km/h), the third phase features speeds between 210 and 215 mph (338 and 346 km/h), and the fourth phase features speeds above 215 mph (346 km/h). The rookie drivers had to pass all four phases in order to be eligible to race in the Indianapolis 500. Speeds were increased by 5 mph (8.0 km/h) for 2002 following consultation between Indy Racing League Director of Operations Brian Barnhart and experienced drivers as well as studying track conditions.

=== Testing – April 8 and 9 ===
A two-day private test session was held in cold weather at Indianapolis involving Team Green to prepare for the race. Tracy set the fastest lap with an average speed of 226.6 mph (364.7 km/h). His teammate Franchitti damaged the rear suspension against the turn one wall.

=== Rookie Orientation – Friday April 12 ===
April 12 was set to be the first full day of rookie orientation but it was cancelled by Barnhart after 15 minutes of green flag running due to intermittent rain affecting efforts to dry the track. Before the rain fell, De Vries, Lazzaro, Mack, Tomas Scheckter, and Rick Treadway each ran laps of the track. Laurent Redon was the only driver not to set a lap time.

=== Rookie Orientation – Saturday April 13 ===
The second day of rookie orientation took place on April 13 and Scheckter set the day's fastest speed in the afternoon session of 226.055 mph (363.800 km/h) after rain cancelled the morning session. He, De Vries, Lazzaro, Mack, and Treadway passed the rookie test, while Harrington passed the refresher test. Redon was required to complete the fourth phase during official practice in May after he completed six of the ten laps in the phase due to an engine failure that left him short of time.

=== Testing – April 16 and 17 ===
On April 16 and 17, a test was conducted at Indianapolis to prepare for the event. Alex Barron, Bräck, Castroneves, De Ferran, Junqueira, Salazar, and Vasser were the seven participants. Salazar crashed heavily backwards into the turn one outside fence, heavily damaging the rear of his car. He was transported to Methodist Hospital in Indianapolis to repair a torn vertebral artery in his chest. Salazar was replaced for the event by Ray.

== Practice ==
=== Sunday May 5 ===
The day began with a parade lap featuring all six previous winners of the Indianapolis 500 (Bräck, Castroneves, Cheever, Buddy Lazier, Luyendyk, and Unser) who were competing in the event. The track was later opened to all entries at 13:21 PM local time, with Bart Peterson, Mayor of Indianapolis, waving the green flag to begin proceedings. There were two cautions for car problems affecting Barron and Felipe Giaffone, then a third for a track inspection. The fourth came four minutes after practice resumed when Bräck crashed into the outside retaining barrier between the first two turns. Bräck returned to pit road.

A fifth caution was necessitated for 36 minutes for debris clear-up and wall repairs when Robby McGehee's front-left tire went flat; he struck the SAFER barrier twice, turned upright and stopped in the grass in the short chute between warm-up lane and track. McGehee sustained hairline fractures in his lower left leg and upper spine but did not lose consciousness. He was transported to Methodist Hospital for observation and X-rays. McGehee's car was destroyed in the collision, and his team constructed a new vehicle from parts purchased from other teams by team owner Larry Cahill. The last two cautions were for an engine failure for Shigeaki Hattori in the first two turns and an electrical fault for Harrington. Weather conditions were sunny for the first day of practice. Scott Sharp set the day's fastest lap at a speed of 227.571 mph (366.240 km/h), ahead of the second-placed Castroneves and third-placed Unser.

=== Monday May 6 ===
Rain began falling on the track at 6:30 AM local time on May 6 and continued to fall for most of the day. Fire and safety trucks were deployed by circuit officials to try and make the track dry and practice officially commenced at 4:43 PM for 1 hour and 17 minutes of running in which 28 drivers partook after a delay of five hours and 43 minutes. There were three cautions totaling 21 minutes issued for debris. Running took place in sunny weather conditions and high humidity. Castroneves was the fastest driver of the day, with a top speed of 226.716 mph (364.864 km/h) set with ten minutes remaining. Redon was second-quickest and he was the only driver to top at 226 mph (364 km/h); Giaffone was third-fastest.

=== Tuesday May 7 ===
For the second consecutive day, rain limited track activity. The May 7 practice session was scheduled to begin at 11:00 AM local time, but rain forced the session to be postponed for three hours and eight minutes and instead start at 2:08 PM local time. Tracy understeered into the outside retaining wall at the exit of turn one but returned to the pit lane with slightly bent right-rear suspension links. There were further stoppages for track inspections and mechanical issues for Billy Boat and Unser. Jones experienced a violent crash when his car spun in turn one due to it possibly losing a flap and was sent backward at a 90-degree angle. The car's rear struck the outside SAFER barrier close to the exit of the turn. He then careened into the infield Armco barrier inside the warm-up lane. Jones was transported by ambulance to Methodist Hospital complaining of back pain. The accident caused the session to conclude early with 19 minutes remaining. Jones sustained a fracture of the cervical vertebrae and was replaced at Team Menard by Raul Boesel. With drafting assistance from Barron, Redon topped the speed charts at 229.808 mph (369.840 km/h), followed by Junqueira and Sharp.

=== Wednesday May 8 ===
Rain restricted track activity for the third consecutive day. Practice for May 8 was set to commence at 11:00 AM local time, but rain forced the session to be postponed for three hours and 26 minutes and instead start at 2:26 PM local time when the rain tapered off. The first three cautions periods were deployed because of debris on track, while the fourth caution was necessitated when Bräck stopped between the first two turns because his car ran out of fuel, which was recovered to pit road. Sharp, with a top speed of 228.350 mph (367.494 km/h), was the fastest driver of the session, which went without any incidents. Redon and Castroneves were second and third, respectively.

=== Thursday May 9 ===
A fourth consecutive day of practice was interrupted by rain, which forced a delay of 90 minutes from 11:00 AM local time to 12:30 PM on May 9. The session was repeatedly interrupted for cautions debris due to either debris, track inspections, Scheckter's engine failing in turn one or the Boyle Maserati ceremonial lap taken by Bill Shaw, son of three-time Indianapolis 500 winner and former Speedway president Wilbur Shaw. Dismore sustained a concussion that required hospitalization when he crashed backwards into the turn one outside SAFER barrier. Kanaan received drafting aid from Barron and Vasser and recorded the day's top speed at 229.503 mph (369.349 km/h). Bräck was second, with Castroneves third.

=== Friday May 10 ===
The May 10 practice session was the first in the week to not be affected by rain. Conditions were dry and sunny for the session. The first two cautions were for debris and a track inspection. Papis spun in turn one due to a loose oil line and his left-hand side hit the turn's outside retaining barrier. He was unharmed. Another caution was prompted for a track inspection before Barron spun in the turn one entry and his car's front and rear struck the SAFER barrier. Further cautions were necessitated for debris, mechanical issues and an aborted ceremonial lap for Mauri Rose's 1947 and 1948 winning entry. Junqueira became the first driver to top 230 mph (370 km/h) at 3:24 PM local time. After that run, the track cooled and 12 more drivers eclipsed the mark. In the end, Castroneves lapped the quickest speed at 232.087 mph (373.508 km/h) at 4:57 PM, leading Buhl in second and Scheckter in third.

=== Saturday May 11 ===
Weather conditions were cold and cloudy for the final practice session before time trials on May 11. Scheckter prompted the first caution when his car began emitting spray due to a cracked oil separator that was changed. Hornish spun 45 degrees to the left at the turn three exit because his engine failed. He avoided hitting the wall but was almost collected by Luyendyk and Scheckter, bringing out the second caution. Tracy spun in turn two and went backwards into the turn's SAFER barrier. Team Green had no back-up car for Tracy, who sustained abrasions to his heels and knees. Junqueira ran the fastest speed of 231.675 mph (372.845 km/h). He was ahead of Scheckter and Buhl.

=== Wednesday May 15 ===
It was sunny and cool for the practice runs on May 15. There were a total of 11 caution periods waved during the day, mostly for debris and track inspections along with a track ceremony. Servia had smoke emitting from his car between turns three and four but he was able to return to pit road. Hornish later stopped on the backstretch apron with a loss of power, and Bräck had a fuel pressure issue that stopped him between the last two turns. Practice was concluded six minutes early for the day's only accident that occurred when Mack spun leaving turn two and hit the outside retaining barrier at the turn's exit with his car's rear and left-hand side wheels. Mack was not injured. For the first time throughout the event, Foyt's team ran strongly after Foyt discovered an faulty shock absorber during a minute examination of their cars. Airton Daré recorded the day's quickest speed of 228.628 mph (367.941 km/h), ahead of his teammate Ray.

=== Thursday May 16 ===
Weather conditions for the May 16 practice session were initially partly cloudy but was twice interrupted for rain, which later cleared off on each occasion. There were two cautions that were not for debris or a track inspection. Junqueira suddenly veered 180 degrees to the right as he was about to enter pit road when he locked the brakes. He spun backwards across the front straightaway and hit the outside retaining barrier without sustaining heavy car damage. Junqueira was unhurt. Jon Herb spun 90 degrees down to the inside of the track leaving turn two due to a possible engine failure and fluid on a tire. He hit the inside retaining barrier on the backstretch. Herb was uninjured. For the second consecutive day, it was Foyt's team who led the speed charts. Ray was the fastest driver with a top speed of 227.291 mph (365.789 km/h) set early in the day. Junqueira put his back-up car second-fastest, ahead of Daré in third.

=== Friday May 17 ===
On May 17, for the second day running, weather conditions were cloudy and cold with brisk winds; practice was interrupted by rain on three separate occasions. Boesel was leaving pit road when he stopped his car in turn two warm-up lane with smoke billowing from his car. A cold drizzle mandated the closure of the track before an increase in the rain intensity forced the session to end prematurely with 35 minutes remaining. Just 29 cars and 26 drivers recorded lap times, and most of them ran fewer than 20 laps around the track for a total of 649 laps. Buhl was the fast competitor with a top speed of 228.077 mph (367.054 km/h), leading second-placed Daré and Barron in third.

=== Saturday May 18 ===
The May 18 practice session took place in cold weather conditions with gusty winds in which drivers who had not qualified for the race worked at building up speed before the final time trial rounds. It was interrupted a total of ten times for debris, track inspections, mechanical issues and one accident. Dismore, Sharp, Servia and Mack each suffered from smoke from their cars. De Ferran stopped between the opening two turns because the left-front wheel was not correctly installed. Leaving turn three, De Vries spun 90 degrees to the left. De Vries did not damage the car and he corrected course and drove through turn four before stopping on the apron. Herb's right-hand side collided with the outside retaining barrier exiting turn one and he stopped on the backstretch apron. Daré was again the fastest driver with a top speed of 227.015 mph (365.345 km/h), ahead of his teammate Ray in second; both drivers set their laps in the team's back-up cars. Franchitti was third-fastest.

=== Sunday May 19 ===
The final practice session before Bump Day time trials was held on May 19, and initially took place in sunny conditions. Only one minute into the session, the yellow caution period was necessitated for debris. Boat then spun 90 degrees to the left leaving turn two and the car's left struck the SAFER barrier. Rain began to fall on the track 40 minutes in, and it ultimately forced to the session to conclude 15 minutes early at 11:00 AM local time. Luyendyk set the session's fastest lap, at a top speed of 229.327 mph (369.066 km/h). Daré and Franchitti took the second and third positions.

== Time trials ==
Each car received three attempts to set a four-lap qualifying effort with the track to themselves and pole position was determined by the fastest driver on the first day of time trials or the quickest qualifier after one trip through the original qualifying line, whichever comes last. When the starting grid was completed at 33 cars, the slowest qualifier, regardless of their position in the provisional lineup, always had the risk of failing to qualify and could be bumped by a quicker qualifier. Three days of time trials were scheduled for 2002.

=== Pole Day – Saturday May 11 ===
Qualifying began at 11:00 AM local time, and was held under cloudy and fairly windy conditions, with air temperatures reaching 57 °F (14 °C). Junqueira earned the pole position with a fastest four-lap average speed of 231.342 mph (372.309 km/h), which was the quickest pole speed since Luyendyk in 1996. He was the first driver to achieve the pole position as the first driver to set an qualifying effort since Emerson Fittipaldi in 1990. Buhl waved off his first effort, because his team felt he could extract more from the vehicle. Buhl earned the second position at 231.033 mph (371.812 km/h) and he was the sole American driver in the top five positions.

Boesel took the third position and he was followed by Giaffone in fourth. Kanaan was the fastest rookie qualifier in fifth place. This meant that four of the first five spots were taken by Brazilian drivers. Cheever and Hornish were sixth and seventh, ahead of Sharp in eighth, who had gear selection trouble. Fisher secured ninth with the fastest effort by a female driver at the track. Scheckter completed the top ten qualifiers. A total of 24 out of the 33 entrants ran a qualifying speed, and all of them surpassed Sharp's pole speed from the previous year. Herb hit the outside retaining barrier leaving turn four, damaging the front-right suspension. Herb was unharmed.

=== Second Day – Sunday May 12 ===
The second day of time trials, scheduled for May 12, was rained out. All remaining time trials were shifted to Bump Day, May 19, which would be the final opportunity for drivers to occupy the last nine qualifying grid slots.

After the rainout on Sunday, the track was closed (as scheduled) on both Monday and Tuesday.

=== Bump Day time trials – Sunday May 19 ===
The qualifying session on Bump Day, which was set to run for six hours beginning at noon local time, was held in conjunction with a practice session for drivers who had already qualified for the race. Weather conditions during the session were again cool, with the ambient temperature between 50 and 56 °F (10 and 13 °C), though skies were partly cloudy. Rain delayed the start by more than an hour, but several cars lined up to make attempts. The field filled to 33 cars just before 2 p.m., with Billy Roe on the bubble. A total of 11 cars completed four-lap qualifying runs during Bump Day. Servia was the first driver onto the track in a car on loan from Conquest Racing but he waved each of his three attempts to qualify; the second of which was abandoned because of a fuel pressure fault, another was waved off due to understeer, and his team had a telemetry glitch preventing it from knowing which gear he was in. Luyendyk in a back-up car, Team Green teammates Tracy, Franchitti after racing setup modifications, and Ray all put in safe speeds. With light rain threatening, Mack bumped Roe out of the field at 2:35 p.m. In doing so, he became the second African American driver to qualify for the race after Willy T. Ribbs in 1993.

With some cars practicing and preparing to enter the qualifying line, Team Green withdrew the slow time previously put in by Michael Andretti in the primary vehicle. The move momentarily reinstated Roe to the field. Andretti's speed greatly improved from the previous weekend, and he safely bumped his way back into the field using the back-up car on the day's final run, demoting Roe from the starting lineup. McGehee waved off his attempt after completing two laps due to a rear-tire imbalance that greatly hindered his visibility, and while he had two tires remaining, he took no further part in Bump Day. With Boat on the bubble, rain stopped qualifying at 3:40 p.m., and it was eventually ended at 4:51 p.m by Barnhart because the conditions were deteriorating, thus completing the starting order. Roe became the first driver to be bumped twice driving the same vehicle since Jim McElreath in 1971; he was made the race's first alternate to replace any driver who qualified in the event they picked up an injury. A clutch malfunction caused Kite to stall three times in an attempt to leave pit road, and despite repairs made to his car, he did not make an attempt because of the return of rain and the track closing as a consequence. Beechler and Gidley were left waiting in the qualifying line due to the rain.

== Carb Day ==
On Thursday May 23, the final two-hour practice session dubbed "Carb Day" was held between the conclusion of time trials and the commencement of the race in sunny weather conditions. The session was twice interrupted, firstly for Treadway stalling on pit road and the second for debris. Kanaan led the speed chart at 225.752 mph (363.313 km/h) with drafting assistance, followed by Hornish in second and Ray in third. All 33 starters completed laps without incident for a total of 771 laps run.

=== Pit Stop Challenge ===
The 26th annual Coors Pit Stop Challenge was held Thursday May 23. Twelve teams competed in a single-elimination bracket. Six crew earned berths based on their pit stop performances at Indy Racing League events since the previous year's race: Panther Racing (Hornish), Cheever Racing (Cheever), Hemelgarn Racing (Buddy Lazier), CGR (Ward), Kelley Racing (Unser and Sharp). Three crews earned spots based on IRL points standings going into the Indianapolis 500: Team Penske (Castroneves and De Ferran), and Mo Nunn Racing (Giaffone). The final three spots were filled by at-large participants. The race pole position winner received an automatic berth; however, if that driver had already qualified for the contest, or declined the invitation, the berth went to the fastest race qualifier not already in the contest. The final two spots were to be filled by a last-chance pit stop "time trials" session scheduled for Wednesday May 8.

Due to inclement weather, the last-chance pit stop "time trials" session was postponed to Wednesday May 15. CGR (Bräck) and Team Rahal (Vasser) advanced from the "time trials". Polesitter Junqueira (CGR) took the final spot. Giaffone later withdrew, and he was replaced with Buhl from Dreyer & Reinbold Racing. Four teams received byes for the first round. During the first round matches, Bräck lost to Buddy Lazier after receiving a penalty for a loose rear wheel. Cheever was also issued a penalty for equipment outside of the pit box. During the quarterfinals, Hornish was penalized and eliminated after he lost a right rear wheel. The finals pitted Penske versus CGR, with the crew of Castroneves defeating Ward. It was the first victory in the event for Castroneves, and the seventh overall for Penske, its first since 1988.

First Round
9	Jeff Ward (Chip Ganassi Racing)	10.5428
33	Bruno Junqueira (Chip Ganassi Racing)	10.9029
19	Jimmy Vasser (Team Rahal)	10.1999
8	Scott Sharp (Kelley Racing)	10.4079
91	Buddy Lazier (Hemelgarn Racing)	10.8687
22	Kenny Bräck (Chip Ganassi Racing)	15.0684
6	Gil de Ferran (Team Penske)	9.5320
51	Eddie Cheever (Cheever Racing)	13.8425

Quarterfinals
9	Jeff Ward (Chip Ganassi Racing)	9.6177
24	Robbie Buhl (Dreyer & Reinbold)	15.989
19	Jimmy Vasser (Team Rahal)	10.2903
4	Sam Hornish Jr. (Panther Racing)	15.2026
3	Hélio Castroneves (Team Penske)	8.9366
91	Buddy Lazier (Hemelgarn Racing)	11.9955
6	Gil de Ferran (Team Penske)	9.6356
7	Al Unser Jr. (Kelley Racing)	11.6030

Semifinals
9	Jeff Ward (Chip Ganassi Racing)	9.8690
19	Jimmy Vasser (Team Rahal)	11.1017
3	Hélio Castroneves (Team Penske)	8.7355
6	Gil de Ferran (Team Penske)	9.7465

Finals
3	Hélio Castroneves (Team Penske)	8.5555
9	Jeff Ward (Chip Ganassi Racing)	10.3433

== Starting grid ==
Row	Inside		Middle		Outside	
1	33	(Brazil) Bruno Junqueira	24	(United States) Robbie Buhl	2	(Brazil) Raul Boesel
2	21	(Brazil) Felipe Giaffone	17	(Brazil) Tony Kanaan R	51	(United States) Eddie Cheever W
3	4	(United States) Sam Hornish Jr.	8	(United States) Scott Sharp	23	(United States) Sarah Fisher
4	52	(South Africa) Tomas Scheckter R	31	(United States) Robby Gordon	7	(United States) Al Unser Jr. W
5	3	(Brazil) Hélio Castroneves W	6	(Brazil) Gil de Ferran	9	(United States) Jeff Ward
6	34	(France) Laurent Redon R	5	(United States) Rick Treadway R	53	(Italy) Max Papis R
7	19	(United States) Jimmy Vasser	91	(United States) Buddy Lazier W	22	(Sweden) Kenny Bräck W
8	20	(United States) Richie Hearn	98	(United States) Billy Boat	55	(Netherlands) Arie Luyendyk W
9	39	(United States) Michael Andretti	44	(United States) Alex Barron R	12	(Japan) Shigeaki Hattori R
10	27	(United Kingdom) Dario Franchitti R	26	(Canada) Paul Tracy	14	(Brazil) Airton Daré
11	11	(United States) Greg Ray	30	(United States) George Mack R	99	(United States) Mark Dismore

Alternate

No.	Driver	Team	Reason	Ref
81	(United States) Billy Roe	Zali Racing	Bumped	

Failed to qualify

No.	Driver	Team	Reason	Ref
10	(United States) Robby McGehee	Cahill Racing	Waved off	
15	(Spain) Oriol Servià R	Walker Racing	Waved off	
37	(United States) Scott Harrington	Brayton Racing	Waved off	
99	(United States) Jimmy Kite	Sam Schmidt Motorsports	Stalled during qualifying attempt (replaced by Mark Dismore)	
16	(United States) Jon Herb	Racing Professionals	Made no qualifying attempt	
32	(United States) Memo Gidley R	Duesenberg Brothers Racing	Made no qualifying attempt	
41	(United States) Donnie Beechler	A. J. Foyt Enterprises	Made no qualifying attempt	
32	(United Kingdom) Johnny Herbert R	Duesenberg Brothers Racing	Made no qualifying attempt (replaced by Memo Gidley)	
37	(Australia) John de Vries R	Brayton Racing	Made no qualifying attempt (replaced by Scott Harrington)	
99	(United States) Anthony Lazzaro R	Sam Schmidt Motorsports	Made no qualifying attempt (replaced by Jimmy Kite)	

== Race ==
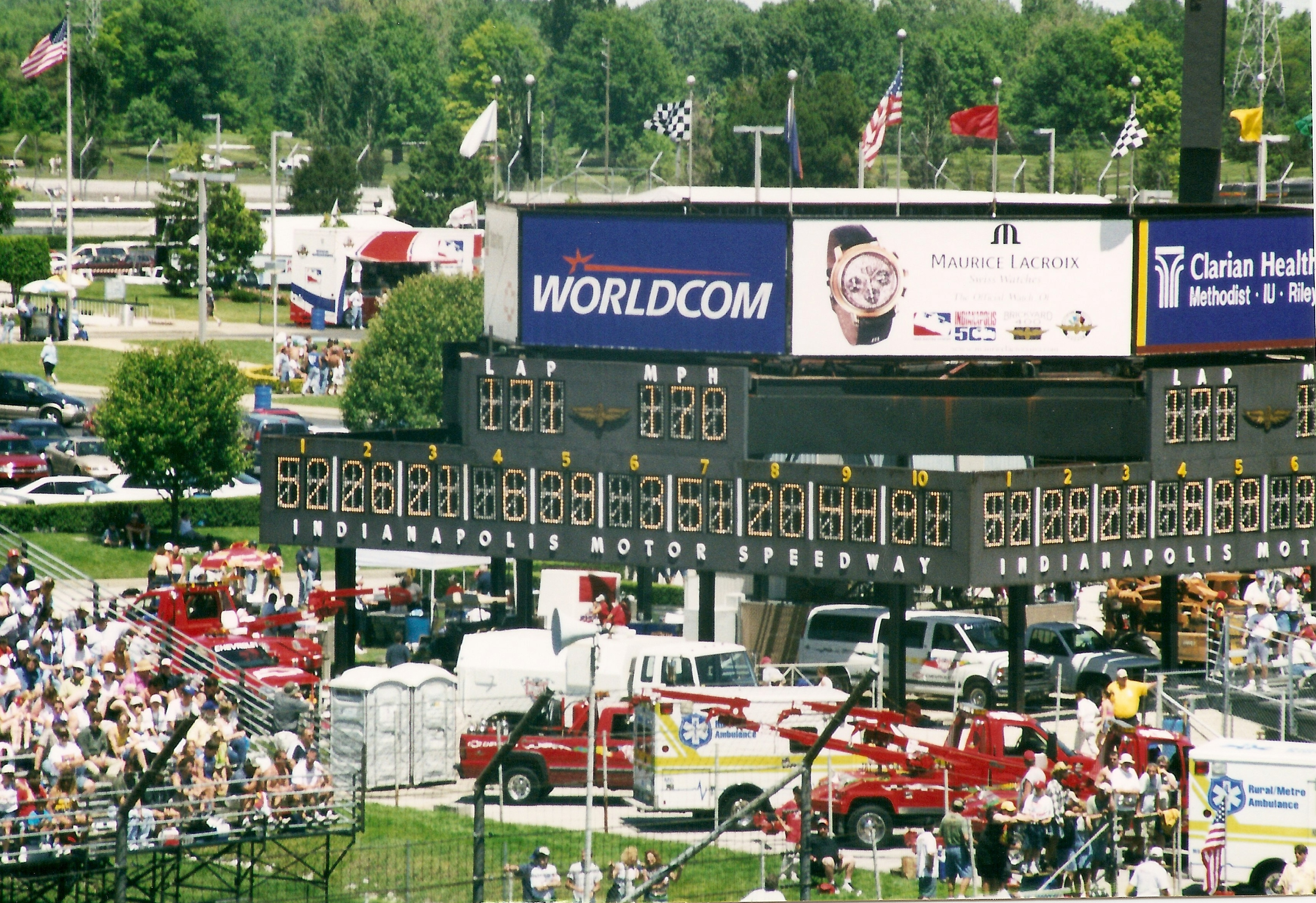
Tomas Scheckter is scored as the leader one lap before he crashes.

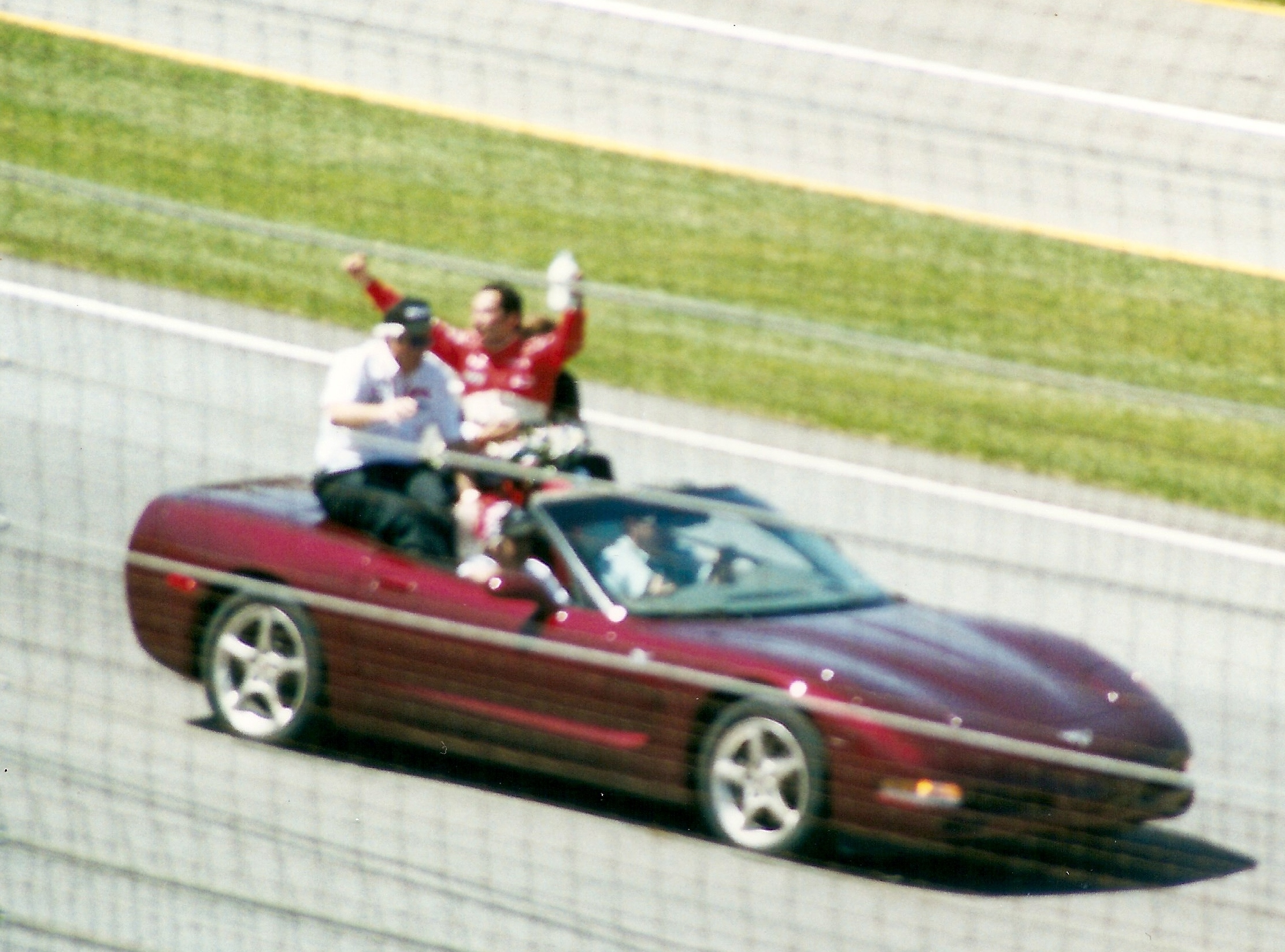
Castroneves celebrates his victory.

After a considerable amount of rain throughout the month of May, race day for the Indianapolis 500 was sunny and clear with temperatures ranging from 74 and 80 °F (23 and 27 °C). Track temperatures were also measured in between 101 and 118 °F (38 and 48 °C). Cadet Josephine Holmon of the United States Military Academy at West Point performed the national anthem. Speedway chairwoman Mari Hulman George gave the command to start engines at 10:52 a.m. EST, and all cars pulled away behind the 50th Anniversary Chevrolet Corvette pace car driven by actor Jim Caviezel. Chief starter Bryan Howard waved the green flag to begin the Indianapolis 500 before more than 400,000 spectators at 11:00 local time.

=== First half ===
All 33 drivers were set to begin the race in rows of three, but Howard let them commence single-file. Junqueira made a clean start to maintain his pole position advantage heading into the first turn. He was unsuccessfully challenged by Buhl on the outside on the back straightaway. On lap two, Kanaan passed Giaffone on the inside at turn three for fourth place and then Giaffone came under pressure from Hornish before Hornish fell back. By the fifth lap, Andretti gained seven positions to run in 18th. Kanaan overtook Boesel on the inside entering turn one to move into the third position on lap seven and he began to close up to Buhl, who had a minor understeer on the approach to all four turns. On lap 17, Schekter passed Boesel on the inside entering turn three for fifth, while Boesel was then passed by Cheever got ahead of him on the main straightaway at the beginning of lap 18. Boesel then lost sixth to Hornish into turn two. On lap 20, Scheckter ran the race's fastest lap with a speed of 226.499 mph (364.515 km/h).

Three laps later, Giaffone lost fourth place to Scheckter while Kanaan overtook Buhl on the inside for second on lap 25. Green flag pit stops commenced on lap 27. Lap 30 saw the deployment of the first caution. Ray spun 180 degrees in the first turn and the rear of his car struck the end of the SAFER barrier. His car's left-rear wheel detached, and as Ray slowed, the tire flew over his cockpit. Ray was unhurt, but he was the first driver to retire from the race. Most of the field used the caution period to make their first pit stops for tires, fuel and car adjustments. During the caution, Junqueira stalled leaving his pit stall, elongating his pit stop to 28 seconds and dropping him to 19th. This promoted Scheckter to the race lead, with Hornish second and Kanaan third. The race restarted on lap 37, with Scheckter holding off Hornish on the outside to retain first place.

On the following lap, after Castroneves had a look at overtaking Boesel on the inside for seventh and was slower leaving turn two, Vasser took advantage of this and passed Castroneves on the inside on the back straightaway for eighth. On lap 49, Hornish attempted to pass Scheckter on the outside as the two were lapping Dismore's slower car into turn four. All three cars were briefly abreast, with Scheckter close to the outside barrier, but he forced Hornish to back off. Kanaan used the incident to move past Hornish on the inside into the first turn for second at the start of lap 50. Seven laps later, Hornish retook second place from Kanaan. As Dismore entered the garage with handling problems and became the race's second retirement on lap 58, the second round of green flag pit stops for fuel and tires commenced. Hornish made a pit stop on lap 62, followed by Scheckter two laps later. Kanaan led the race for three laps until his pit stop at the end of lap 67. Sharp, De Ferran and Unser each led a single lap apiece. After the completion of the pit stops, Kanaan took the race lead from Scheckter.

On lap 74, Hornish was unable to steer his car well due to aerodynamic turblence generated by Cheever's car ahead of him. He went high onto the banking and brushed the outside concrete retaining wall with his right-rear wheel exiting turn four, damaging his right rear suspension and puncturing a tire. Hornish entered pit road for repairs but was later pushed into the garage to remedy handling difficulties. On lap 79, the caution came out for debris. Tracy later claimed responsibility, stating that he threw a harmless headrest cushion out on the track, hoping to draw a yellow, since he was in danger of being lapped. Several drivers made pit stops for fuel, tires and car adjustments under caution. The fifth-placed Gordon suffered a major invisible methanol fire and explosion in his pit stall caused by a tangled fuel hose on lap 81. The explosion blew the top off the 240 US gal (910 L; 200 imp gal) pit-side fuel tank. No one (including Gordon) was hurt. The incident dropped Gordon from fifth to 13th because the pit stop took 75 seconds to complete. His team had no usable fuel available, but they were allowed by Barnhart to take over Ray's vacated pit stall for the rest of the race.

The race resumed with Kanaan leading teammate Giaffone on lap 88. The following lap, Vasser drove slowly on the warm-up lane with a gearbox problem while Junqueira suffered an transmssion failure on the backstretch but he returned to the pit lane. Junqueira's car billowed smoke, spewed fluids and briefly caught fire, depositing oil on the racing line between turns three and four. Just as race officials were about to display the caution, Kanaan ran onto the oil and was unable to control his car, which snapped sideways. He spun 90 degrees leaving turn three and the rear and left-hand sides of his car hit the outside retaining wall. As cars swerved to avoid Kanaan's debris, Treadway was squeezed into the turn three barrier. These two accidents prompted the race's third caution period. More pit stops took place under caution. Scheckter retook the lead for the lap 99 restart, ahead of De Ferran. Scheckter pulled away from De Ferran, and led by two seconds at the end of lap 100.

=== Second half ===
De Ferran was instructed by Penske team owner Roger Penske to draft as much as possible to conserve fuel as Scheckter continued to pull clear of him. On lap 113, the race order was Scheckter, De Ferran, Sharp, Andretti, Tracy, Cheever, Giaffone, Castroneves, Barron, and Ward. Scheckter became the first of the leaders to make a green flag pit stop for fuel and tires on lap 120. The stop took eleven seconds to complete, and it promoted De Ferran to the race lead. De Ferran held the lead for three laps before his own pit stop on the 124th lap. This promoted Sharp to the race lead, which he held for two laps until lap 126, at which point Giaffone was promoted to the lead position that he held between laps 127 and 129. Barron took the first position for laps 130 and 131. Following the completion of the pit stops, Scheckter returned to the first position. On the 138th lap, Sharp entered pit road with smoke billowing from the engine because it had tightened up. He retired from the event after being pushed into the garage.

On lap 145, Andretti, who reported a vibration, passed Tracy for third place. Another round of green flag pit stops commenced on the 150th lap when Scheckter entered pit road. De Ferran thus re-assumed the first position for the following seven laps. On lap 158, Giaffone drafted past De Ferran on the inside into turn one for first. He led the following three laps before his pit stop on lap 161. That moved Barron to the race lead for four laps until he entered pit road on the 165th lap. After the end of the latest round of pit stops, it was Scheckter who returned to first, with Tracy second. During lap 172, Giaffone overtook Tracy on the inside at turn three for second, and began to quickly pull away from Tracy. On lap 173, race leader Scheckter slid high in turn four due to a severe understeer and crashed against the outside SAFER barrier with the right-hand side of his car after leaving the short shute between turns three and four. He slid down the frontstretch before stopping. Scheckter was unharmed.

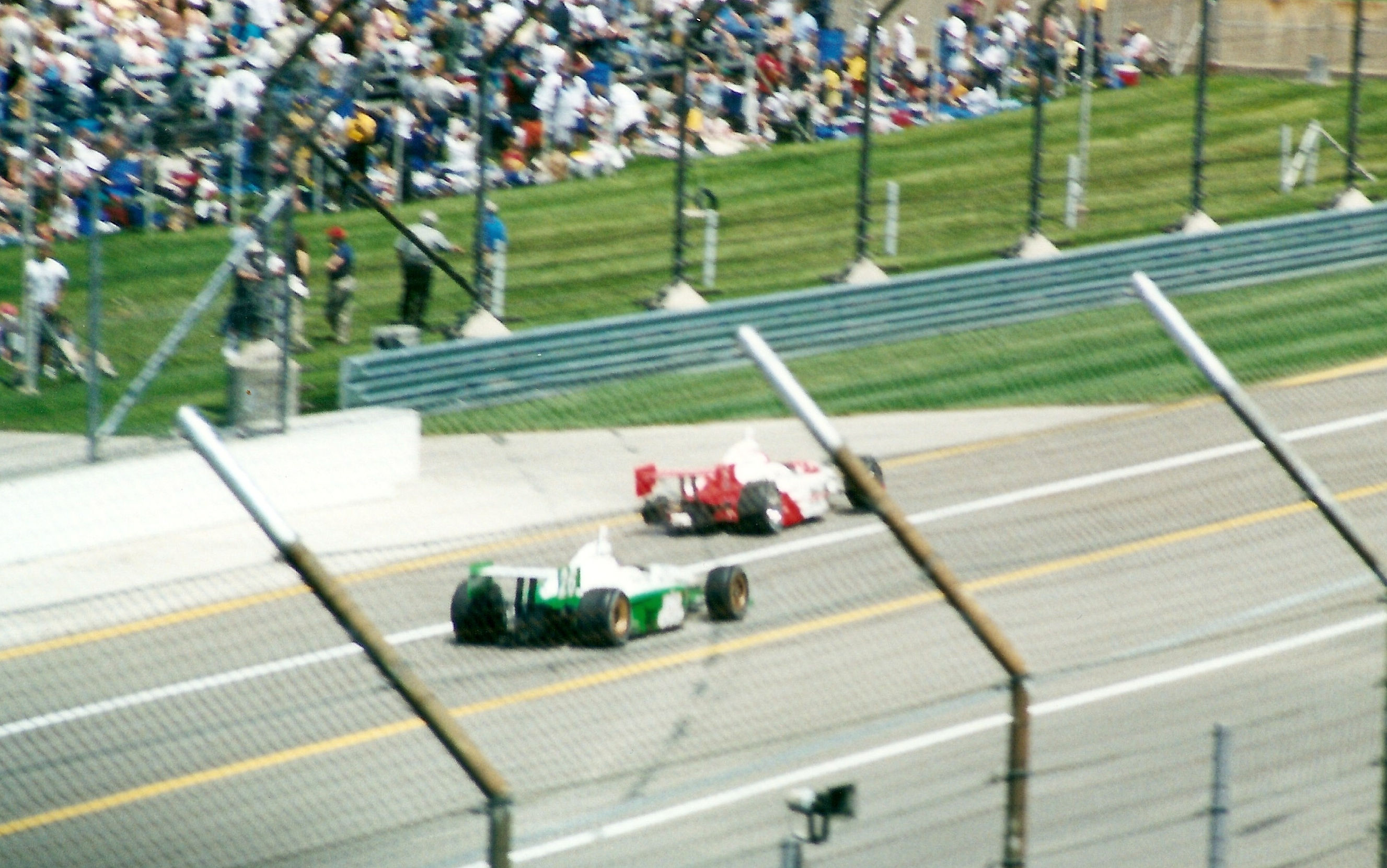
Gil de Ferran loses the left-rear wheel after exiting pit road.

Under the yellow, the leaders made pit stops for fuel and tires. Exiting the pit road, De Ferran's left-rear wheel detached because it was incorrectly secured by his pit crew. This meant De Ferran was required to complete a full lap for his return to pit road with three wheels on his car and he fell out of contention. Gambling on fuel, Castroneves stayed out with a car low on fuel and worn tires and took over the lead on the 177th lap. Barron was second. On lap 179, officials recognized that Tracy was inadvertently ahead of Giaffone, which required an extra lap under caution to sort out the running order. Giaffone was moved to third, and Tracy back to fourth. The caution was extended yet another lap because a spectator threw a can on the track. On lap 181, racing resumed with Castroneves leading, and Giaffone jumping into second with an pass on Barron on the frontstretch. Into turn three, Tracy overtook Barron on the outside for third. On lap 188, Cheever almost lost control of his car, allowing Barron to pass him on the inside at turn two. With ten laps to go, Castroneves still led Giaffone, but Castroneves was starting to run low on fuel, and his pace started to slow as a result. Giaffone closed within a half-second.

=== Finish ===
With less than three laps remaining, Giaffone drove below Castroneves, attempting to take the lead. The lapped car of Franchitti pulled alongside Castroneves, effectively blocking Giaffone. Castroneves held off the challenge, and third place Tracy managed to move past Giaffone on the outside at turn four for second. Giaffone later complained that Franchitti was unfairly blocking to help his teammate Tracy. With two laps left, Castroneves led Tracy by only 0.22 seconds at the start/finish line. Down the backstretch, Tracy started to move to the outside, in an attempt to make a pass for the lead with his car receiving the maximum amount of horsepower after adjusting the fuel settings. While they were approaching turn three, a crash occurred on a different part of the track.

The lapped car of rookie Redon got loose in turn one, allowing the eighth-placed Buddy Lazier to dive below him in turn two. Redon came down on Lazier, the two cars touched, and both crashed hard into the outside wall exiting turn two. At the same time the crash occurred in turn two, Tracy and Castroneves were almost side-by-side in turn three. A yellow flag came out for the crash, and Tracy completed the pass on the outside. Castroneves backed off the throttle, which allowed Giaffone to pass him, as well as the lapped car of Hornish. Many believed at the time that Castroneves had run out of fuel, or was nearly out of fuel, and thought that was the reason he suddenly had slowed down. Castroneves claims that he saw the yellow light illuminate on his dashboard, and thinking at first it was the fuel light, and he reacted by letting off.

Believing he had just taken the lead with one lap to go, Tracy proclaimed on his two-way radio "Yeah baby!". Barry Green soon responded "there's a problem." Officials in race control, led by Barnhart, stated that Castroneves was the leader.

On the final lap, Tracy, Giaffone, and the lapped car of Hornish, had broken away, and crossed the finish line approximately 19 seconds before the rest of the field. The Corvette pace car, was in turn four, and was not able to enter the track and pack up the field. At a slowed pace, and running low on fuel, Castroneves, with the lapped car of Franchitti immediately behind him (in a car painted nearly identical to Tracy's) took the checkered flag as the winner. Despite the concern for fuel, and after running 42 laps since his last pit stop, Castroneves completed his victory lap, and had 1 gallon of fuel remaining in the tank. He performed his usual celebratory practice of climbing the front stretch catch fence before appearing in victory lane. The race had a total of five cautions and 19 lead changes by nine different drivers. Scheckter led four times for a total of 85 laps, more than any other driver. Castroneves led once for the concluding 24 laps.

== Box score ==
Finish	Start	No	Name	Qual	Chassis	Engine	Laps	Status	Entrant
1	13	3	(Brazil) Hélio Castroneves W	229.052	Dallara	Chevrolet	200	166.499 mph	Team Penske
2	29	26	(Canada) Paul Tracy	228.006	Dallara	Chevrolet	200	+0.0376	Team Green
3	4	21	(Brazil) Felipe Giaffone	230.326	G-Force	Chevrolet	200	+0.1285	Mo Nunn Racing
4	26	44	(United States) Alex Barron R	228.580	Dallara	Chevrolet	200	+1.4037	Blair Racing
5	6	51	(United States) Eddie Cheever W	229.786	Dallara	Infiniti	200	+2.4549	Team Cheever
6	22	20	(United States) Richie Hearn	227.233	Dallara	Chevrolet	200	+3.2022	Sam Schmidt Motorsports
7	25	39	(United States) Michael Andretti	228.713	Dallara	Chevrolet	200	+3.5895	Team Green
8	11	31	(United States) Robby Gordon	229.127	Dallara	Chevrolet	200	+6.1206	Team Menard
9	15	9	(United States) Jeff Ward	228.557	G-Force	Chevrolet	200	+7.5654	Chip Ganassi Racing
10	14	6	(Brazil) Gil de Ferran	228.671	Dallara	Chevrolet	200	+28.5425	Team Penske
11	21	22	(Sweden) Kenny Bräck W	227.240	G-Force	Chevrolet	200	+32.8195	Chip Ganassi Racing
12	12	7	(United States) Al Unser Jr. W	229.058	Dallara	Chevrolet	199	Running	Kelley Racing
13	30	14	(Brazil) Airton Daré	227.760	Dallara	Chevrolet	199	Running	A. J. Foyt Enterprises
14	24	55	(Netherlands) Arie Luyendyk W	228.848	G-Force	Chevrolet	199	Running	Treadway Racing
15	20	91	(United States) Buddy Lazier W	227.495	Dallara	Chevrolet	198	Accident	Hemelgarn Racing
16	2	24	(United States) Robbie Buhl	231.033	G-Force	Infiniti	198	Running	Dreyer & Reinbold Racing
17	32	30	(United States) George Mack R	227.150	G-Force	Chevrolet	198	Running	310 Racing
18	23	98	(United States) Billy Boat	226.589	Dallara	Chevrolet	198	Running	CURB/Agajanian/Beck Motorsports
19	28	27	(United Kingdom) Dario Franchitti R	228.177	Dallara	Chevrolet	197	Running	Team Green
20	27	12	(Japan) Shigeaki Hattori R	228.192	Dallara	Infiniti	197	Engine	Bradley Motorsports
21	3	2	(Brazil) Raul Boesel	230.613	Dallara	Chevrolet	197	Running	Team Menard
22	16	34	(France) Laurent Redon R	228.106	Dallara	Infiniti	196	Accident	Conquest Racing
23	18	53	(Italy) Max Papis R	227.941	Dallara	Infiniti	196	Running	Team Cheever
24	9	23	(United States) Sarah Fisher	229.439	G-Force	Infiniti	196	Running	Dreyer & Reinbold Racing
25	7	4	(United States) Sam Hornish Jr.	229.585	Dallara	Chevrolet	186	Running	Panther Racing
26	10	52	(South Africa) Tomas Scheckter R	229.210	Dallara	Infiniti	172	Accident	Team Cheever
27	8	8	(United States) Scott Sharp	229.486	Dallara	Chevrolet	137	Engine	Kelley Racing
28	5	17	(Brazil) Tony Kanaan R	230.253	G-Force	Chevrolet	89	Accident	Mo Nunn Racing
29	17	5	(United States) Rick Treadway R	228.039	G-Force	Chevrolet	88	Accident	Treadway Racing
30	19	19	(United States) Jimmy Vasser	227.743	Dallara	Chevrolet	87	Gearbox	Team Rahal
31	1	33	(Brazil) Bruno Junqueira	231.342	G-Force	Chevrolet	87	Gearbox	Chip Ganassi Racing
32	33	99	(United States) Mark Dismore	227.096	Dallara	Chevrolet	58	Handling	Sam Schmidt Motorsports
33	31	11	(United States) Greg Ray	227.155	Dallara	Chevrolet	28	Accident	A. J. Foyt Enterprises

W Former Indianapolis 500 winner

R Indianapolis 500 Rookie

All entrants utilized Firestone tires.

=== Race statistics ===
Lap Leaders
Laps	Leader
1–32	Bruno Junqueira
33–63	Tomas Scheckter
64–66	Tony Kanaan
67	Scott Sharp
68	Gil de Ferran
69	Al Unser Jr.
70–89	Tony Kanaan
90–91	Felipe Giaffone
92–120	Tomas Scheckter
121–124	Gil de Ferran
125–126	Scott Sharp
127–129	Felipe Giaffone
130–131	Alex Barron
132–149	Tomas Scheckter
150–157	Gil de Ferran
158–160	Felipe Giaffone
161–165	Alex Barron
166–172	Tomas Scheckter
173–176	Felipe Giaffone
177–200	Hélio Castroneves

Total laps led
Driver	Laps
Tomas Scheckter	85
Bruno Junqueira	32
Hélio Castroneves	24
Tony Kanaan	23
Gil de Ferran	13
Felipe Giaffone	12
Alex Barron	7
Scott Sharp	3
Al Unser Jr.	1

Cautions: 5 for 33 laps
Laps	Reason
30–36	Greg Ray crash in turn 1
79–87	Debris
90–98	Rick Treadway, Tony Kanaan crash in turn 3
173–180	Tomas Scheckter crash in turn 4
199–200	Laurent Rédon, Buddy Lazier crash in turn 2

== Controversy ==
=== Initial confusion ===
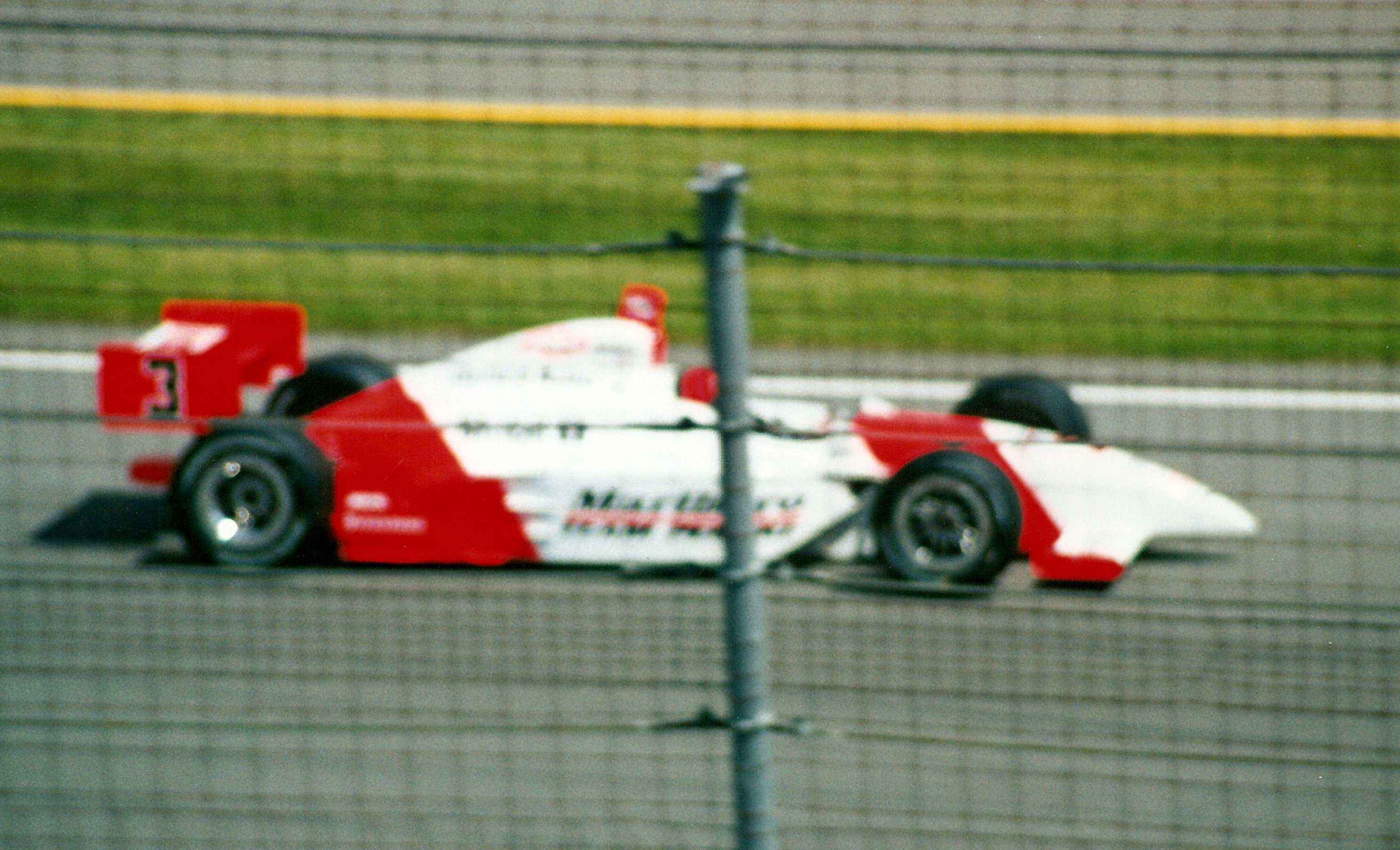
Hélio Castroneves

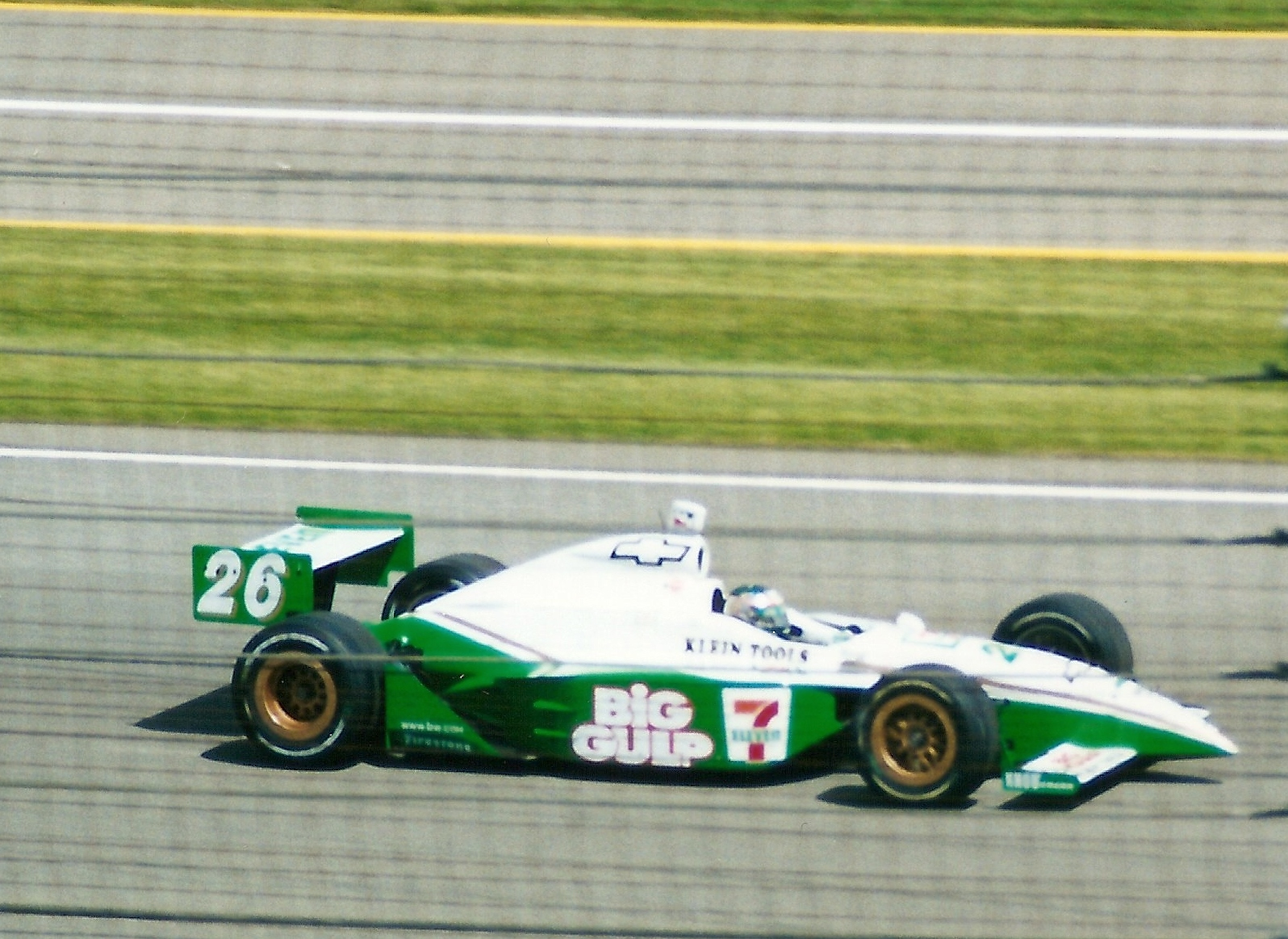
Paul Tracy

In the immediate aftermath of the race, confusion reigned among the competitors, broadcasters, and fans. Barnhart, in Race Control, made the initial call at the moment, stating "yellow, yellow, yellow, three is your leader" ("three" being Castroneves car number) over the director's radio channel, and such was repeated by his assistant Mel Harder over the teams' race control radio channel. Harder was in charge of activating the yellow lights around the track, and the in-car dashboard yellow light system.

On the television broadcast, commentator Paul Page erroneously stated that Castroneves was the leader because the scoring "reverted back to the previous lap." Such rules are used if electronic transponder-based scoring with multiple timing loops was not used, as in the past, but since the advent of transponder-based scoring, the rule has generally been instead of the last completed lap, but the last timing loop the car crossed at the point of caution. Page also, on at least one occasion, misidentified Franchitti's car as that of Tracy's (the two cars had identical liveries). ABC waited over 14 minutes before they showed a replay of the pass or the crash. However, ABC did air split-screen footage clearly showing the crash occurred before the pass. The footage, however, did not show conclusive evidence of when the yellow light came on.

On the live radio broadcast Mike King announced that "race control said the pass would not count." Donald Davidson echoed the same erroneous information that the scoring reverted to the previous lap (though it was last completed loop prior to caution), and added that the cars did not race back to the yellow, as was the policy in NASCAR at the time (the rule was changed in September 2003, when the practice was banned and scoring reverts to the last scoring loop crossed before the caution was called, except in the final lap or a caution that ends a race because of weather or darkness, when it reverts to video replays). A similar controversy took place at the 2019 INDYCAR Portland road course event at the start when a massive crash at the opening chicane caused 11 laps of caution as officials could not determine positions based on video evidence. Officials decided for the 2020 season that scoring reverts to the last loop crossed when a caution occurs.

In the pits, Barry Green immediately challenged the decision. He told Tracy over the two-way radio that there was "a problem," and later chimed sarcastically that "they (presumably IRL officials) are not going to let one of us (one of the CART teams) win." He contended that Tracy said he had completed the pass before the yellow caution light came on. Tracy said "I feel that I was ahead of him when it went yellow. I passed him, and I saw green. We're going to protest this thing because I was ahead of him when the yellow came out."

Meanwhile, Castroneves stated the yellow had come out before the pass was made. "The only reason he passed me, it's because the yellow came on, and I lifted off. I cannot feel sorry for Paul Tracy." Other drivers had different opinion. Cheever called the finish "confusing." Franchitti, Tracy's teammate, said that "Paul (Tracy) had passed (Castroneves) on the outside before the yellow came out." Mario Andretti, however, spoke with Tracy after the race, and said that Tracy was "more concerned with keeping an eye on Castroneves' car" than watching the yellow lights.

=== Protest ===
Official results were posted five hours after the race, with Castroneves declared the winner and Paul Tracy second. As the cars did not cross the finish line in order, the standings were amended so that Tracy's finishing time was scored as a fraction of a second behind that of Castroneves. Team Green immediately filed a protest, and the hearing was scheduled for May 27 at 10:00 a.m. During the two-hour hearing, Brian Barnhart and Indy Racing League officials denied the protest and presented their conclusions. Officials determined that Castroneves was indisputably the leader under the following relevant times:

- At the last scoring antenna (entrance of turn 3) before the caution; margin was 0.0371 seconds
- At the time of the accident of Redon and Lazier in turn 2
- At the time that race official Brian Barnhart made the radio call for a caution
- At the time that the dashboard caution lights were activated

In rejecting the protest, Barnhart stated that "Team Green did not present anything that was conclusive enough in any way, shape or form to change our mind."

=== Appeals hearing ===
Team Green submitted a written appeal of the protest decision on June 3. A closed-door appeals hearing was scheduled for June 17. Speedway President Tony George presided over the hearing, with Indianapolis attorney Dave Mittingly assisting. Both Team Green and Penske Racing presented evidence, and several persons involved provided testimony. Among those who gave testimony were Tracy, Castroneves, Hornish, Franchitti, Barnhart (race control), Doug Boles (spotter in turn three for Hornish), and Jeff Horton (IRL Director of Engineering).

The basis of Team Green's argument was that Tracy was the leader when the yellow lights around the track came on, and that those lights should control. While they acknowledged that Castroneves was leading at the time Barnhart called for the yellow, they argued it was irrelevant unless the yellow lights were on. They also did not dispute that it was possible that the dashboard yellow lights on Castroneves' car came on while Castroneves was still leading. They cited the inconsistencies of the dashboard system from car to car, and claimed the dashboard lights had not come on in Tracy's car until after he had made the pass.

Penske Racing's primary defense concentrated on their interpretations of the IRL rulebook. They stated that at the commencement of a yellow caution period, the positioning of the cars is a judgement call made quickly by the officials. They also stated that the ruling of a car passing another car under a caution period is specifically listed as not protestable or appealable under the existing rules.

On July 2, 2002, Tony George issued an 18-page decision on the appeal. He upheld the victory of Hélio Castroneves, and denied Team Green's appeal. In his decision, George stated that "Clearly Helio (Castroneves) was in front when the call (for the yellow) was made" and that several of the caution signals, including trackside and dashboard lights, a radio announcement and a flag closing the pits, were displayed before Tracy's pass. George also accepted Penske's arguments that, even if Tracy was ahead before the caution, the decision to call Castroneves the leader was an unappealable judgment call.

=== Aftermath ===
After the decision was rendered, the reaction among fans, media, and competitors was split largely along party lines. CART supporters generally sided with Team Green and Tracy denouncing the decision, while IRL supporters generally accepted the final result. Many Tracy supporters felt the decision was politically motivated, suggesting that Tony George favored Penske Racing (a full-time IRL team) and punished the part-time, rival CART-based effort of Team Green. The controversy was divisive, and worked to reopen wounds from the 1996 open wheel split. Robin Miller openly criticized the decision, and considered Tracy "the unofficial 2002 Indy winner." The day after the race, he presented video footage on RPM 2Night, which he claimed showed evidence the pass was completed under green. Shirts and hats were sold at CART events declaring Tracy the "Real IRL 500 winner", which Tracy would be seen publicly wearing at times.

A few weeks after the decision, Barry Green announced he was selling his share of Team Green to Michael Andretti, and would be taking a sabbatical from the sport. He reportedly had spent over $100,000 on legal expenses. Tracy finished out a mediocre CART season with Green, and left the team at season's end. He won one race, and was voted the 2002 CART Most Popular Driver. During his acceptance speech, he thanked Tony George for helping him win the award, and added that the dispute strengthened his fanbase. "Since that whole disaster, I've become a fan favorite. I guess this is like my Borg-Warner Trophy."

With CART facing financial trouble at season's end, Michael Andretti took the team, then called Andretti Green, next Andretti Autosport, and currently Andretti Global, full-time to the IndyCar Series for 2003. Andretti Autosport has since scored five Indianapolis 500 wins -- 2005, 2007, 2014, 2016, and 2017. Andretti also is a partner in Bryan Herta Autosport in the 2016 race that team won.

Tracy, angered by the loss, refused to return to the IRL and the Indy 500 in subsequent seasons. On September 23, 2003, when asked if he were interested in driving in the IRL in 2004, he responded "I'm not driving one of those crapwagons." The quote took on a life of its own, and was adopted as a political slogan and battle cry for IRL detractors for years to come. Under the profile section Tracy's official web site (PaulTracy.com) career highlights include "2002 Indy 500 Runner Up (yeah right)." Tracy continued in the Champ Car series, finally winning a season title in 2003, although it came after most of the top teams had already defected to the IRL. He eventually left the series, and had a short stint in the NASCAR Busch Series. In the wake of the 2008 open wheel unification, Tony George himself reportedly offered Tracy a ride with Vision Racing. Tracy initially declined, musing that "I'm not going to drive for hamburgers and hot dogs." In July 2008, Tracy finally crossed lines and signed with Vision Racing to drive in the Edmonton Indy. He then made a highly publicized return at the 2009 Indianapolis 500, and was previously with NBC Sports as one of the network's INDYCAR broadcasters until he left at the end of the 2021 season.

INDYCAR played off the controversy when Tracy won at the Speedway in 2016 at the Sportscar Vintage Racing Association Brickyard Vintage Racing Invitational Pro-Am, a race featuring amateur drivers paired with Indianapolis Motor Speedway racers, with the headline "Tracy finally gets to drink milk" upon his first career win at the Speedway.

== Broadcasting ==
=== Radio ===
The race was broadcast live on the radio by the Indianapolis Motor Speedway Radio Network. It was carried by the American Forces Network and by 1,200 stations in Canada and the United States. Mike King was the chief announcer, and color commentary was provided by Johnny Rutherford. Track historian Donald Davidson was heard on the broadcast, and Chris Economaki provided analysis. Jerry Baker, Chris Denari, Mark Jaynes and Kevin Lee reported from each of the track's turns. Adam Alexander, Kim Morris and Jim Murphy were the pit lane reporters, while Chuck Marlowe reported from the garages, and Howdy Bell from the medical center.

Indianapolis Motor Speedway Radio Network
Booth Announcers	Turn Reporters	Pit/garage reporters
Chief Announcer: Mike King; Driver expert: Johnny Rutherford; Driver expert: Johnny Parsons; Historian: Donald Davidson; Commentary: Chris Economaki	Turn 1: Jerry Baker; Turn 2: Kevin Lee; Turn 3: Mark Jaynes; Turn 4: Chris Denari	Kim Morris (north pits); Adam Alexander (center pits); Jim Murphy (south pits)
Chief Announcer: Mike King; Driver expert: Johnny Rutherford; Driver expert: Johnny Parsons; Historian: Donald Davidson; Commentary: Chris Economaki	Turn 1: Jerry Baker; Turn 2: Kevin Lee; Turn 3: Mark Jaynes; Turn 4: Chris Denari	Chuck Marlowe (garages); Howdy Bell (hospital)

=== Television ===
The race was broadcast live in the United States on ABC Sports, except in Indianapolis on WRTV, where it was tape-delayed to primetime. Paul Page served as the play-by-play commentator, with Scott Goodyear the color commentator. Bob Jenkins took the role of hosting the race broadcast for the first time. Jack Arute, Vince Welch, Jerry Punch, and Gary Gerould served as pit reporters.

Viewership for the event declined by nine per cent compared to the previous year's broadcast, with a 5.3 overnight rating and a 14 share.

ABC Television
Booth Announcers	Pit/garage reporters
Host: Bob Jenkins; Announcer: Paul Page; Color: Scott Goodyear	Jack Arute; Vince Welch; Dr. Jerry Punch; Gary Gerould

== Gallery ==
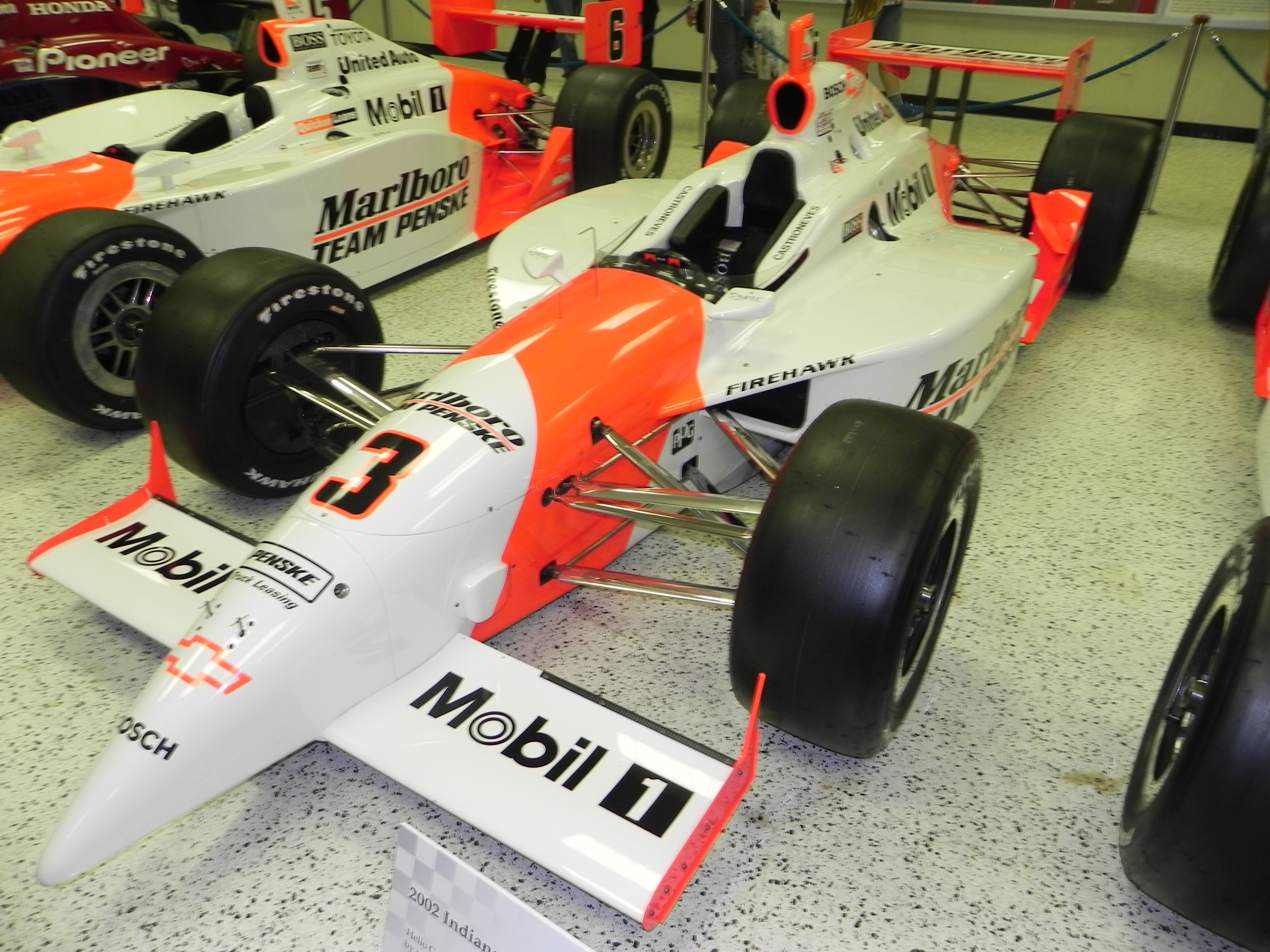
2002 winning car

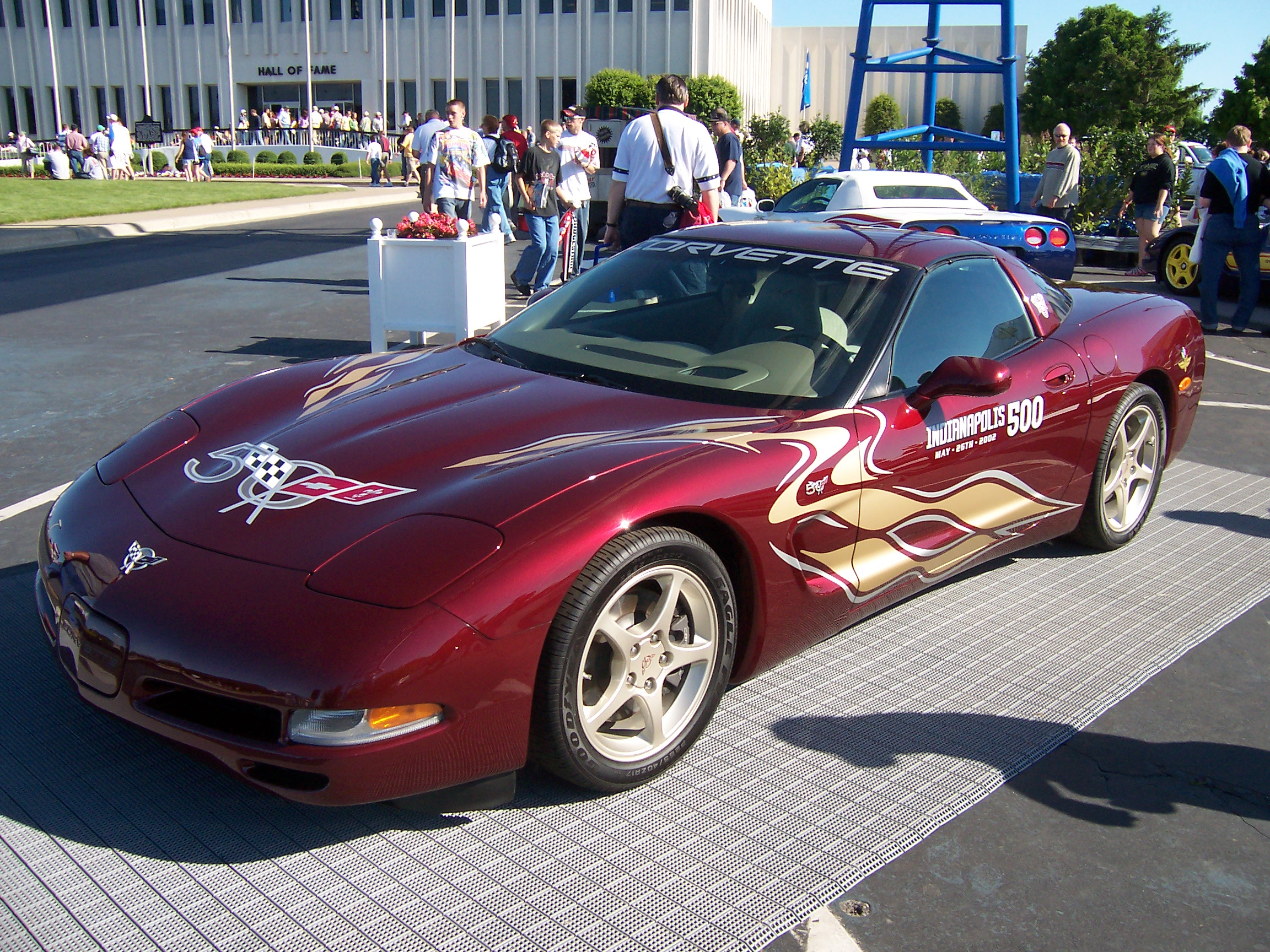
2002 Chevrolet Corvette pace car

== Notes ==
=== Works cited ===
- 2002 Indianapolis 500 Daily Trackside Report for the Media
- Indianapolis 500 History: Race & All-Time Stats - Official Site
- Indy 500 Capsule

2001 Indianapolis 500; Hélio Castroneves	2002 Indianapolis 500; Hélio Castroneves	2003 Indianapolis 500; Gil de Ferran
