= Max Papis =

Italian racing driver (born 1969)

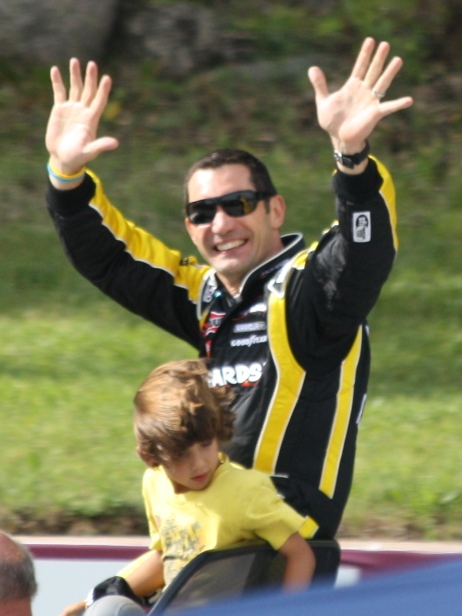
- Papis at Road America in 2011
- Born: Massimiliano Papis; 3 October 1969 (age 57); Como, Italy
- Achievements: 2000 24 Hours of Daytona SR Winner; 2002 24 Hours of Daytona Overall Winner; 2004 Grand-Am Rolex Sports Car Series Daytona Prototype Champion; 2004 Toyota Pro/Celebrity Race Pro Winner; 2004 12 Hours of Sebring GTS Winner; 2007 12 Hours of Sebring GT1 Winner; 2017 Indy Legends Charity Pro–Am race B Production class winner

NASCAR Cup Series career
- 36 races run over 4 years
- 2013 position: 58th
- Best finish: 43rd (2009, 2010)
- First race: 2008 Toyota/Save Mart 350 (Sonoma)
- Last race: 2013 Cheez-It 355 at The Glen (Watkins Glen)
Wins	Top tens	Poles
0	1	0

NASCAR O'Reilly Auto Parts Series career
- 14 races run over 8 years
- 2013 position: 48th
- Best finish: 48th (2013)
- First race: 2006 Zippo 200 (Watkins Glen)
- Last race: 2013 Nationwide Children's Hospital 200 (Mid-Ohio)
Wins	Top tens	Poles
0	4	0

NASCAR FedEx Freight Truck Series career
- 45 races run over 5 years
- 2013 position: 92nd
- Best finish: 18th (2011)
- First race: 2008 Chevy Silverado 350K (Texas)
- Last race: 2013 Chevrolet Silverado 250 (Mosport)
Wins	Top tens	Poles
0	5	0

NASCAR Canada Series career
- 1 race run over 1 year
- Best finish: 55th (2012)
- First race: 2012 Pinty's 250 (Kawartha)
Wins	Top tens	Poles
0	0	0

IndyCar Series career
- 3 races run over 2 years
- Best finish: 26th (2006)
- First race: 2002 Indianapolis 500 (Indianapolis)
- Last race: 2006 Indianapolis 500 (Indianapolis)
Wins	Podiums	Poles
0	0	0

Champ Car career
- 113 races run over 8 years
- Best finish: 5th (1999)
- First race: 1996 Miller 200 (Mid-Ohio)
- Last race: 2003 Molson Indy Montreal (Montreal)
- First win: 2000 Marlboro Grand Prix of Miami (Homestead)
- Last win: 2001 Honda Grand Prix of Monterey (Laguna Seca)
Wins	Podiums	Poles
3	11	2

Formula One World Championship career
- Nationality: (Italy) Italian
- Active years: 1995
- Team: Footwork
- Entries: 7
- Championships: 0
- Wins: 0
- Podiums: 0
- Career points: 0
- Pole positions: 0
- Fastest laps: 0
- First entry: 1995 British Grand Prix
- Last entry: 1995 European Grand Prix

24 Hours of Le Mans career
- Years: 1997, 2003–2008
- Teams: Moretti Racing, JML Team Panoz, Corvette Racing
- Best finish: 5th (2003)
- Class wins: 0
- Categorisation: FIA Platinum (until 2016); FIA Gold (2017–2023); FIA Silver (2024–)

Massimiliano "Max" Papis (born 3 October 1969) is an Italian professional motorsport driver who has competed in several top-level motorsports events such as Le Mans 24 Hours, Formula One and Champ Car. He has three Champ Car victories. He is the son-in-law of Emerson Fittipaldi. Papis also currently drives in the NASCAR Whelen Euro Series.

== Personal life ==
Papis was born on 3 October 1969 in Como, Italy. He was raised in Italy and got an interest in car racing at a young age, winning several go-kart races and several rounds for racing clubs in Italy.

Papis is married to Tatiana Papis, daughter of the racing driver Emerson Fittipaldi, and has two children, cousins of Pietro Fittipaldi and Enzo Fittipaldi. His sons' godfathers are fellow Italian Alex Zanardi (Marco) and British Dario Franchitti (Matteo).

The couple founded Max Papis Innovations (MPI) in 2009 and has since been producing and distributing steering wheels, quick-releases, racing gloves and racing seats for the consumer market on both race cars and simulation rigs.

Papis is a member of the "brat pack", a group of CART drivers that were close friends off the track, that included Dario Franchitti, Tony Kanaan and the late Greg Moore.

== Career ==
=== Formula One ===
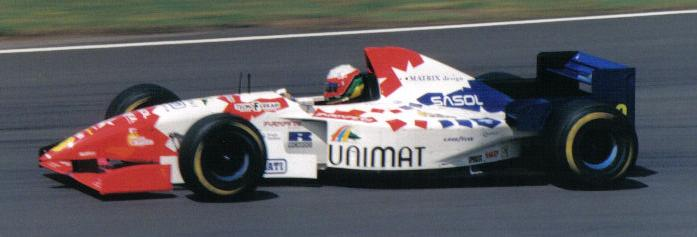
Papis made his Formula One debut for Footwork at the 1995 British Grand Prix.

After a spell as the Lotus team's test driver in 1994, Papis replaced Gianni Morbidelli in the Footwork team for seven races in the middle of the 1995 Formula One season, as he brought valuable sponsorship to the cash-strapped outfit. Despite being a race-winner in Formula 3000, he often struggled with the unfamiliar car, and was occasionally outpaced by his much-maligned teammate, Taki Inoue. He also proved to be an unlucky driver, suffering a spectacular puncture and suspension failure on his début race at Silverstone due to clipping the pit lane wall after a tire change, being left on the grid at Hockenheim due to a transmission failure, and spinning on dust and oil kicked up by David Coulthard at the Ascari Chicane on the first lap of the Italian GP, causing a pile-up and a restart. However, Papis only missed out on a point in the restarted race when he was overtaken by Jean-Christophe Boullion's Sauber on the last lap. When Morbidelli returned, Papis was out of a drive and headed to America for 1996.

=== Champ Car ===
Papis moved to CART Champ Car racing in 1996 as a replacement for Jeff Krosnoff, who was killed in the previous race in Toronto. In 1999, he joined the more competitive Rahal team, almost winning the US 500 before running out of fuel, and finishing fifth in the series. He started the next year by winning the 2000 season-opener, but failed to finish in the championship top-ten. In 2001, he won twice and finished sixth overall, but was dropped by the team, mainly due to two collisions with teammate Kenny Bräck. In 2002, he competed with Sigma Autosport, scoring two third places finishes at Long Beach and Milwaukee, before the team folded due to financial problems. He did a partial season with PK Racing in 2003, with a best result of fourth at Road America. Papis also raced in the 2002 and 2006 Indianapolis 500s for Cheever Racing, claiming a fourteenth place finish in his second appearance. He mostly concentrated on sportscars since 2001, remarking that "Champ Car needs me more than I need it" as the series struggled to fill its grid for 2003 after many teams defected to the IRL.

=== IndyCar ===
Papis raced in the IRL early in his career. He has raced for Roger Penske, Andretti-Green Racing and Panther Racing from 2001 to 2009. Papis is a long-time friend of drivers Tony Kanaan and Alex Zanardi. In 2013 at the Indianapolis 500, Papis and Zanardi were present in the victory celebration when Kanaan won his first Indy 500.

In 2016, Papis was hired by the IndyCar Series as a race steward along with Arie Luyendyk and Dan Davis.

=== ASCAR ===
On 8 June 2003, Papis made his debut in the ASCAR Racing Series by joining Team HTML in the British Stock Car racing series. He made his debut in Round 3 of the championship driving the No.68 Pontiac, placing fourteenth overall at Rockingham Motor Speedway. This would be his only race during the season and he was replaced by Derek Hayes for the rest of the season.

=== NASCAR ===
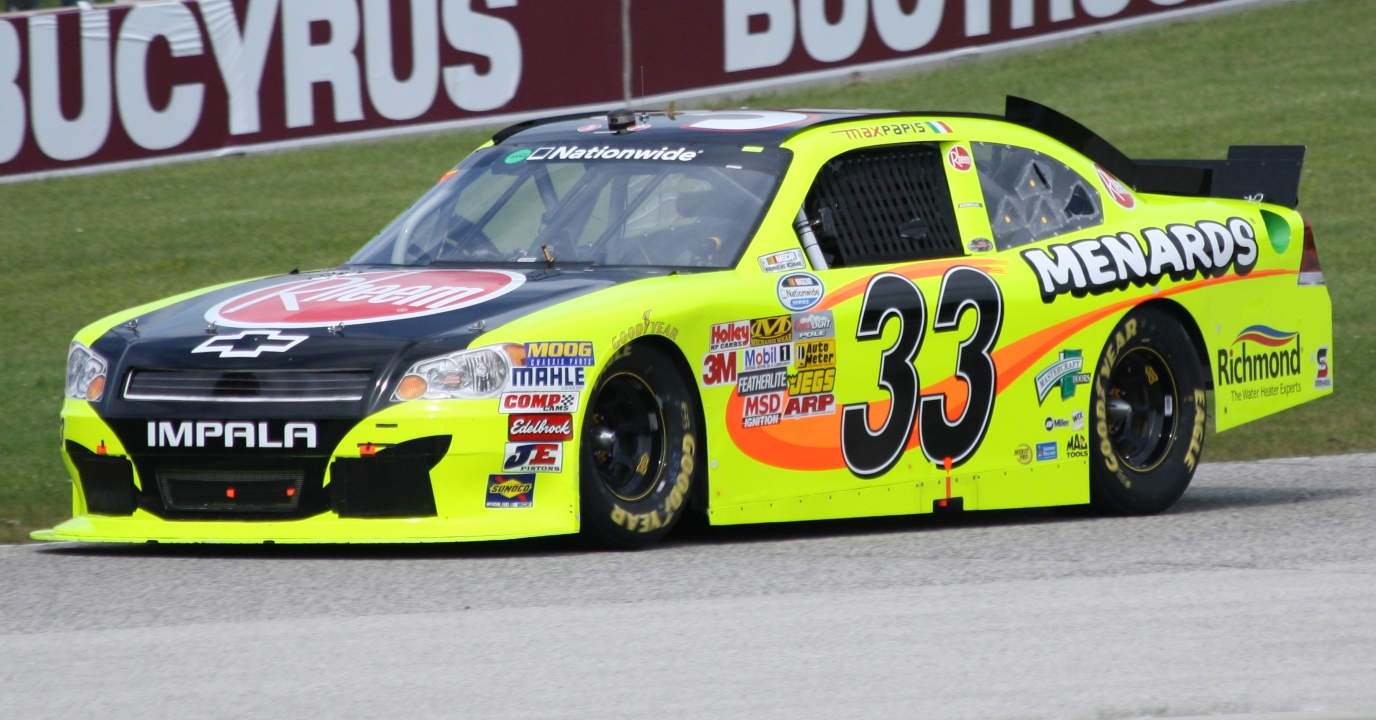
2011 Nationwide car at Road America

Papis made his NASCAR debut in August 2006, competing in the Busch Series race at Watkins Glen International Raceway for McGill Motorsports following the release of Tim Sauter from the ride. He attempted to qualify for the NASCAR Cup Series race but failed to qualify.

Papis also announced that he would run two races in 2007 for James Finch's Phoenix Racing No. 01 Chevy. In his first race, at Montreal in the inaugural NAPA 200, Papis avoided Marcos Ambrose' crash (caused by a disqualified Robby Gordon), with two laps left, to finish in third place. At Watkins Glen the next week, his engine failed on lap 2.

Papis made his Cup Series debut at Infineon Raceway in 2008, piloting the No. 66 Haas CNC Racing Chevrolet in place of regular driver Scott Riggs. He was also scheduled to drive the No. 64 car for Rusty Wallace, Inc. on three road course races in the 2008 Nationwide Series. Haas CNC Racing hired Papis to drive the No. 70 Chevrolet Monte Carlo at the course at Watkins Glen in the Sprint Cup Series in August 2008. He was announced as the driver of the No. 13 GEICO Toyota in eighteen races in the 2009 and a full-time ride in the 2010 Sprint Cup.

In his first Cup season with a dedicated ride, Papis recorded a career best eighth-place finish at Watkins Glen and fifteenth starting position at Fontana. He also recorded twelfth place finish at Infineon Raceway. In February at Daytona in 2010, Papis had the fastest truck in the truck series event, nearly winning his first Truck series event after leading for some laps. Papis was collected in an accident with fifteen laps left in the race, while going towards the lead.

After Watkins Glen in 2010, the team announced that Papis would be replaced by Casey Mears for 2011 and Papis would race in the Truck Series for the team.

Also in 2010, Papis recorded a top-30 finish in the Daytona 500, but failed to qualify at Bristol. He nearly had a top-ten running at Talladega but was caught up in an accident. At Montreal in the Nationwide Series, Papis drove for Richard Childress Racing and while leading on the final lap, took too much of a last-turn curb, got passed by Boris Said, and recorded a second-place finish.

In 2011, Papis raced in the Truck Series partly for Germain, resulting in an eighteenth place finish in the standings.

From 2011 to 2013, Papis had good runs on the road-course races but did not win any of them. In 2011 at Road America, he had a good car, but he was spun out by Jacques Villeneuve with two laps left. When the race ended, Papis blocked Villeneuve's car on pit road and they argued. In 2012, Papis finished in fourth place at Road America. Also in 2012, Papis ran one race in NASCAR Canadian Tire Series at Kawartha Speedway driving No. 24 Dodge for Scott Steckly, he started sixteenth and finished 21st.

In 2013 at Road America, Papis, who spent nearly the entire race in the top five, found himself being spun out twice in the waning laps. When the race was over, a furious Papis went up to Billy Johnson (who spun him out one of the times) and slapped him. After being separated by officials Papis and Johnson exchanged shouts ending with Papis walking off. When he spoke to reporters, Papis apologized for the slap.

In early August 2013, Papis was named to substitute for Tony Stewart in the No. 14 Chevrolet in the Sprint Cup Series at Watkins Glen International after Stewart suffered a broken leg in a sprint car accident. He posted a solid top 15 finish. Papis also competed in the inaugural Nationwide Children's Hospital 200 at the Mid-Ohio Sports Car Course for Richard Childress Racing, finishing in fourth place.

Papis drove for NTS Motorsports in the Camping World Truck Series' inaugural race at Canadian Tire Motorsport Park, the 2013 Chevrolet Silverado 250, in September 2013. Finishing 6th in the event, he was slapped following the race by the girlfriend of driver Mike Skeen, who he had crashed with on the final lap, suffering a dislocated jaw.

Also in 2013, Papis ran four races in the NASCAR Whelen Euro Series Elite 1 Division, he ran two races driving No. 33 Chevrolet for OverDrive team and two races driving No. 19 Chevrolet for his own team (Max Papis Racing). Papis had a best finish of second at Tours Speedway.

In 2014, Papis' team fielded the No. 99 car for the NASCAR Whelen Euro Series for Kevin Gilardoni in the Elite 1 Division.

In 2017, Papis ran one race in NASCAR K&N Pro Series East driving No. 13 Toyota for Eric McClure at Watkins Glen International, he started seventeenth and finished eighteenth after the engine blew.

=== Other racing ===
In 2016, Papis made his debut in Stadium Super Trucks series, running the Honda Indy Toronto rounds in the No. 9 truck. He finished eleventh and seventh.

== "Mad Max" ==
Papis earned the nickname "Mad Max" at the 1996 24 Hours of Daytona during his last stint at the end of the race. Although his second-place Ferrari 333SP had been battered due to collisions, some of its bodywork held together by tape, Papis unlapped himself by passing the race leader (the Doyle Racing Riley & Scott-Oldsmobile driven by Wayne Taylor) and proceeded to set some of the fastest laps of the entire race. Taylor was nursing his car around the track due to an overheating problem and otherwise would have been able to cruise to a win, but Papis' pace and the slowing Oldsmobile suggested that Papis could theoretically take the win from him. Papis' speed was achieved at the cost of maximum fuel consumption. At one point late in the race, Papis came into the pits for fuel, spectacularly racing down the pit lane at near full speed. (Pit lane speed limits were imposed the next year). Taylor was still ahead by 64 seconds at the end of the race.

== Motorsports career results ==
=== Complete International Formula 3000 results ===
(key) (Races in bold indicate pole position) (Races in italics indicate fastest lap)

International Formula 3000 results
Year	Entrant	Chassis	Engine	1	2	3	4	5	6	7	8	9	DC	Points
1993	Vortex Motorsport	Reynard 93D	Cosworth	DON; 4	SIL; Ret	PAU; 5	PER; Ret	HOC; Ret	NÜR; 15	SPA; Ret	MAG; Ret	NOG; 6	10th	6
1994	Mythos Racing	Reynard 94D	Judd	SIL; 7	PAU; Ret	**CAT**; 1	PER; 4	HOC; Ret	SPA; 11	EST; 13	MAG; 6		6th	13

=== Complete Formula One results ===
(key)

Formula One results
Year	Entrant	Chassis	Engine	1	2	3	4	5	6	7	8	9	10	11	12	13	14	15	16	17	WDC	Points
1995	Footwork Hart	Footwork FA16	Hart V8	BRA	ARG	SMR	ESP	MON	CAN	FRA	GBR; Ret	GER; Ret	HUN; Ret	BEL; Ret	ITA; 7	POR; Ret	EUR; 12	PAC	JPN	AUS	22nd	0

=== Complete American open wheel results ===
(key)

==== CART ====
CART results
Year	Team	No.	Chassis	Engine	1	2	3	4	5	6	7	8	9	10	11	12	13	14	15	16	17	18	19	20	21	Rank	Points	Ref
1996	Team Arciero-Wells	25	Reynard 96i	Toyota RV8A V8t	MIA	RIO	SRF	LBH	NAZ	500	MIL	DET	POR	CLE	TOR	MIC	MOH; 24	ROA; 9	VAN	LS; 22						26th	4	
1997	Team Arciero-Wells	25	Reynard 97i	Toyota RV8B V8t	MIA; 19	SRF; 14	LBH; 25	NAZ; 22	RIO; 13	GAT; 26	MIL; 19	DET; 11	POR; 28	CLE; 27	TOR; 15	MIC; 8	MOH; 14	ROA; 15	VAN; 20	LS; 14	FON; 12					24th	8	
1998	Team Arciero-Wells	25	Reynard 98i	Toyota RV8C V8t Toyota RV8D V8t	MIA; 26	MOT; 13	LBH; 24	NAZ; 14	RIO; 28	GAT; 22	MIL; 16	DET; 18	POR; 11	CLE; 12	TOR; 8	MIC; 19	MOH; 14	ROA; 11	VAN; 9	LS; 12	HOU; 5	SRF; 17	FON; 16			21st	25	
1999	Team Rahal	7	Reynard 99i	Ford XD V8t	MIA; 5	MOT; 16	LBH; 9	NAZ; 13	RIO; 4	GAT; 5	MIL; 13	POR; 8	CLE; 16	ROA; 5	TOR; 5	MIC; 7	DET; 26	MOH; 5	**CHI**; 4	VAN; 23	LS; 3	HOU; 4	SRF; 2	FON; 2		5th	150	
2000	Team Rahal	7	Reynard 2Ki	Ford XF V8t	MIA; 1	LBH; 20	RIO; 16	MOT; 8	NAZ; 22	MIL; 7	DET; 2	POR; 25	CLE; 18	TOR; 8	MIC; 9	CHI; 24	MOH; 4	ROA; 7	VAN; 8	LS; 16	GAT; 6	HOU; 24	SRF; 16	FON; 12		14th	88	
2001	Team Rahal	7	Lola B01/00	Ford XF V8t	MTY; 12	LBH; 17	TEX; C	NAZ; 24	MOT; 6	MIL; 8	DET; 11	**POR**; 1	CLE; 18	TOR; 8	MIC; 16	CHI; 13	MOH; 24	ROA; 16	VAN; 22	LAU; 2	ROC; 11	HOU; 9	LS; 1	SRF; 9	FON; 2	6th	107	
2002	Sigma Autosport	22	Lola B02/00	Ford XF V8t	MTY; 9	LBH; 3	MOT; 18	MIL; 3	LS; 13	POR	CHI	TOR	CLE	VAN												19th	32	
2002	Fernández Racing	51	Lola B02/00	Honda HR-2 V8t											MOH; 15	ROA	MTL	DEN	ROC	MIA	SRF	FON; 14	MXC			19th	32	
2003	PK Racing	27	Lola B02/00	Ford XFE V8t	STP	MTY	LBH	BRH	LAU	MIL	LS	POR; 15	CLE; 12	TOR; 16	VAN; 9	ROA; 4	MOH; 9	MTL; 9	DEN	MIA	MXC	SRF	FON; C			17th	25	

==== IndyCar Series ====
IndyCar Series results
Year	Team	No.	Chassis	Engine	1	2	3	4	5	6	7	8	9	10	11	12	13	14	15	16	17	18	19	Rank	Points	Ref
2002	Red Bull Cheever Racing	53	Dallara IR-02	Infiniti VRH35ADE V8	HMS	PHX	FON	NZR	INDY; 23	TXS	PPIR	RIR	KAN	NSH	MIS	KTY	STL	CHI						**43rd**	**16**	
2002	Marlboro Team Penske	6	Dallara IR-02	Chevrolet Indy V8															TX2; 21					**43rd**	**16**	
2006	Cheever Racing	52	Dallara IR-05	Honda HI6R V8	HMS	STP	MOT	INDY; 14	WGL	TXS	RIR	KAN	NSH	MIL	MIS	KTY	SNM	CHI						27th	16	
2008	Rubicon Race Team	44	Dallara IR-05	Honda HI7R V8	HMS	STP	MOT^{1}	LBH^{1}	KAN	INDY; DNQ	MIL	TXS	IOW	RIR	WGL	NSH	MOH	EDM	KTY	SNM	DET	CHI	SRF^{2}	NC	-	

^{1} Run on same day.
^{2} Non-points-paying, exhibition race.

==== Indy 500 results ====
Year	Chassis	Engine	Start	Finish	Team
2002	Dallara	Infiniti	18	23	Cheever
2006	Dallara	Honda	18	14	Cheever
2008	Dallara	Honda	DNQ		Rubicon

=== 24 Hours of Le Mans results ===
Year	Team	Co-drivers	Car	Class	Laps	Pos.	Class pos.
1997	(Italy) Moretti Racing	(Italy) Gianpiero Moretti (Belgium) Didier Theys	Ferrari 333 SP	LMP	321	6th	**3rd**
2003	(United States) JML Team Panoz	(Monaco) Olivier Beretta (United States) Gunnar Jeannette	Panoz LMP01 Evo-Élan	LMP900	360	5th	**3rd**
2004	(United States) Corvette Racing	(Canada) Ron Fellows (United States) Johnny O'Connell	Chevrolet Corvette C5-R	GTS	334	8th	**2nd**
2005	(United States) Corvette Racing	(Canada) Ron Fellows (United States) Johnny O'Connell	Chevrolet Corvette C6.R	GT1	347	6th	**2nd**
2006	(United States) Corvette Racing	(Canada) Ron Fellows (United States) Johnny O'Connell	Chevrolet Corvette C6.R	GT1	327	12th	7th
2007	(United States) Corvette Racing	(United Kingdom) Oliver Gavin (Monaco) Olivier Beretta	Chevrolet Corvette C6.R	GT1	22	DNF	DNF
2008	(United States) Corvette Racing	(United Kingdom) Oliver Gavin (Monaco) Olivier Beretta	Chevrolet Corvette C6.R	GT1	341	15th	**3rd**

=== ASCAR results ===
Year	Team / Constructor	(United Kingdom)		(United Kingdom)	(Germany)	(United Kingdom)		(United Kingdom)		(United Kingdom)	(Germany)		(United Kingdom)		Pts
Year	Team / Constructor	R1	R2	R3	R4	R5	R6	R7	R8	R9	R10	R11	R12	R13	Pts
2003	Team HTML Pontiac			14											114

=== NASCAR ===
(key) (Bold – Pole position awarded by qualifying time. Italics – Pole position earned by points standings or practice time. * – Most laps led.)

==== Sprint Cup Series ====
NASCAR Sprint Cup Series results
Year	Team	No.	Make	1	2	3	4	5	6	7	8	9	10	11	12	13	14	15	16	17	18	19	20	21	22	23	24	25	26	27	28	29	30	31	32	33	34	35	36	NSCC	Pts	Ref
2006	Furniture Row Racing	78	Chevy	DAY	CAL	LVS	ATL	BRI	MAR	TEX	PHO	TAL	RCH	DAR	CLT	DOV	POC	MCH	SON	DAY	CHI	NHA	POC	IND	GLN; DNQ	MCH	BRI	CAL	RCH	NHA	DOV	KAN	TAL	CLT	MAR	ATL	TEX	PHO	HOM	NA	-	
2008	Haas CNC Racing	66	Chevy	DAY	CAL	LVS	ATL	BRI	MAR	TEX	PHO	TAL	RCH	DAR	CLT	DOV	POC	MCH	SON; 35	NHA	DAY	CHI	IND	POC																65th	92	
2008	Haas CNC Racing	70	Chevy																						GLN; 43	MCH	BRI	CAL	RCH	NHA	DOV	KAN	TAL	CLT	MAR	ATL				65th	92	
2008	Germain Racing	13	Toyota																																		TEX; DNQ	PHO	HOM; DNQ	65th	92	
2009	Germain Racing	13	Toyota	DAY	CAL	LVS; 36	ATL	BRI	MAR	TEX; 35	PHO	TAL; 18	RCH	DAR; 35	CLT; 42	DOV; DNQ	POC	MCH; 35	SON; 12	NHA	DAY; DNQ	CHI	IND; DNQ	POC	GLN; 8	MCH	BRI; DNQ	ATL; 40	RCH; 37	NHA	DOV	KAN; 32	CAL; 35	CLT; 41	MAR	TAL; 29	TEX; DNQ	PHO; 35	HOM; DNQ	43rd	1047	
2010	Germain Racing	13	Toyota	DAY; 40	CAL; 28	LVS; 33	ATL; 34	BRI; DNQ	MAR; 40	PHO; 40	TEX; 22	TAL; 40	RCH; DNQ	DAR; 29	DOV; DNQ	CLT; DNQ	POC; 34	MCH; 43	SON; 43	NHA; 43	DAY; 42	CHI; 42	IND; 43	POC; DNQ	GLN; 22	MCH; 41	BRI	ATL	RCH	NHA	DOV	KAN	CAL	CLT	MAR	TAL	TEX	PHO	HOM	43rd	907	
2013	Stewart–Haas Racing	14	Chevy	DAY	PHO	LVS	BRI	CAL	MAR	TEX	KAN	RCH	TAL	DAR	CLT	DOV	POC	MCH	SON	KEN	DAY	NHA	IND	POC	GLN; 15	MCH	BRI	ATL	RCH	CHI	NHA	DOV	KAN	CLT	TAL	MAR	TEX	PHO	HOM	58th	0^{1}	

===== Daytona 500 =====
Year	Team	Manufacturer	Start	Finish
2010	Germain Racing	Toyota	31	40

==== Xfinity Series ====
NASCAR Xfinity Series results
Year	Team	No.	Make	1	2	3	4	5	6	7	8	9	10	11	12	13	14	15	16	17	18	19	20	21	22	23	24	25	26	27	28	29	30	31	32	33	34	35	NNSC	Pts	Ref
2006	McGill Motorsports	36	Chevy	DAY	CAL	MXC	LVS	ATL	BRI	TEX	NSH	PHO	TAL	RCH	DAR	CLT	DOV	NSH	KEN	MLW	DAY	CHI	NHA	MAR	GTY	IRP	GLN; 14	MCH	BRI	CAL	RCH	DOV	KAN	CLT	MEM	TEX; 40	PHO	HOM	97th	164	
2007	Phoenix Racing	1	Chevy	DAY	CAL	MXC	LVS	ATL	BRI	NSH	TEX	PHO	TAL	RCH	DAR	CLT	DOV	NSH	KEN	MLW	NHA	DAY	CHI	GTY	IRP	CGV; 3	GLN; 41	MCH	BRI	CAL	RCH	DOV	KAN	CLT	MEM	TEX	PHO	HOM	105th	205	
2008	Rusty Wallace Racing	64	Chevy	DAY	CAL	LVS	ATL	BRI	NSH	TEX	PHO	MXC; 15	TAL	RCH	DAR	CLT	DOV	NSH	KEN	MLW	NHA	DAY	CHI	GTY	IRP	CGV; 20	GLN; 11	MCH	BRI	CAL	RCH	DOV	KAN	CLT	MEM	TEX	PHO	HOM	74th	351	
2009	Phoenix Racing	1	Chevy	DAY	CAL	LVS	BRI	TEX	NSH	PHO	TAL	RCH	DAR	CLT	DOV	NSH	KEN	MLW	NHA	DAY	CHI	GTY	IRP	IOW	GLN	MCH	BRI	CGV; 20	ATL	RCH	DOV	KAN	CAL	CLT	MEM	TEX	PHO	HOM	127th	103	
2010	Kevin Harvick Inc	33	Chevy	DAY	CAL	LVS	BRI	NSH	PHO	TEX	TAL	RCH	DAR	DOV	CLT	NSH	KEN	ROA	NHA	DAY	CHI	GTY	IRP	IOW	GLN	MCH	BRI	CGV; 2	ATL	RCH	DOV	KAN	CAL	CLT	GTY	TEX	PHO	HOM	98th	175	
2011	Kevin Harvick Inc	33	Chevy	DAY	PHO	LVS	BRI	CAL	TEX	TAL	NSH	RCH	DAR	DOV	IOW	CLT	CHI	MCH	ROA; 23	DAY	KEN	NHA	NSH	IRP	IOW	GLN	CGV	BRI	ATL	RCH	CHI	DOV	KAN	CLT	TEX	PHO	HOM		123rd	0^{1}	
2012	Richard Childress Racing	33	Chevy	DAY	PHO	LVS	BRI	CAL	TEX	RCH	TAL	DAR	IOW	CLT	DOV	MCH	ROA; 4	KEN	DAY	NHA	CHI	IND	IOW	GLN	CGV	BRI	ATL	RCH	CHI	KEN	DOV	CLT	KAN	TEX	PHO	HOM			66th	41	
2013	Richard Childress Racing	33	Chevy	DAY	PHO	LVS	BRI	CAL	TEX	RCH	TAL	DAR	CLT	DOV	IOW; 31	MCH	ROA; 17	KEN	DAY	NHA	CHI	IND	IOW	GLN	MOH; 4	BRI	ATL	RCH	CHI	KEN	DOV	KAN	CLT	TEX	PHO	HOM			48th	81	

==== Camping World Truck Series ====
NASCAR Camping World Truck Series results
Year	Team	No.	Make	1	2	3	4	5	6	7	8	9	10	11	12	13	14	15	16	17	18	19	20	21	22	23	24	25	NCWTC	Pts	Ref
2008	SS-Green Light Racing	07	Toyota	DAY	CAL	ATL	MAR	KAN	CLT	MFD	DOV	TEX	MCH	MLW	MEM	KEN	IRP	NSH	BRI	GTW	NHA	LVS	TAL	MAR	ATL	TEX; 29	PHO	HOM; 27	69th	158	
2009	Germain Racing	9	Toyota	DAY	CAL; 10	ATL; 20	MAR; 13	KAN	CLT	DOV; 16	TEX	MCH	MLW	MEM	KEN	IRP	NSH	BRI; 28	CHI	IOW	GTW	NHA; 22	LVS; 18	MAR; 21	TAL; 22	TEX	PHO	HOM	34th	958	
2010	Germain Racing	9	Toyota	DAY; 21	ATL	MAR; 8	NSH	KAN	DOV; 29	CLT	TEX	MCH	IOW	GTY; 15	IRP	POC	NSH	DAR	BRI; 14	CHI	KEN	NHA	LVS	MAR	TAL; 27	TEX; 23	PHO	HOM; 18	33rd	947	
2011	Germain Racing	9	Toyota	DAY; 12	PHO; 15	DAR; 18	MAR; 10	NSH; 23	DOV; 13	CLT; 25	KAN; 22	TEX; 15	KEN; 11	IOW; 20	NSH; 27	IRP; 18	POC; 11	MCH; 19	BRI; 26	ATL; 14	CHI; 18	NHA; 20	KEN; 28	LVS; 29	TAL; 10	MAR; 18	TEX; 14	HOM; 21	18th	643	
2013	NTS Motorsports	14	Chevy	DAY	MAR	CAR	KAN	CLT	DOV	TEX	KEN	IOW	ELD	POC	MCH	BRI	MSP; 6	IOW	CHI	LVS	TAL	MAR	TEX	PHO	HOM				92nd	0^{1}	

==== Whelen Euro Series – Elite 1 ====
NASCAR Whelen Euro Series – Elite 1 results
Year	Team	No.	Make	1	2	3	4	5	6	7	8	9	10	11	12	NWES	Pts	Ref
2013	OverDrive	33	Chevy	NOG	NOG	DIJ	DIJ	BRH	BRH	TOU; 2	TOU; 25					23rd	?	
2013	Max Papis Racing	19	Chevy									MNZ; 6	MNZ; 21	LEM	LEM	23rd	?	

=== International Race of Champions ===
(key) (Bold - Pole position. * – Most laps led.)

International Race of Champions results
Year	Make	1	2	3	4	Pos.	Points	Ref
2005	Pontiac	DAY; 6	TEX; 6	RCH; 9	ATL; 9	10th	30	
2006	Pontiac	DAY; 4	TEX; 10	DAY; 2	ATL; 8	6th	46	

=== IMSA SportsCar Championship results ===
(key)(Races in bold indicate pole position, Results are overall/class)

Year	Team	Class	Make	Engine	1	2	3	4	5	6	7	8	9	10	11	Rank	Points	Ref
2014	Marsh Racing	P	Coyote Corvette DP	Chevrolet 5.5L V8	DAY; 10	SIR	LBH	LS	DET	WGL	MSP	IMS	ELK	COA	PET; 5	35th	49	
2015	Action Express Racing	P	Coyote Corvette DP	Chevrolet 5.5L V8	DAY; 4	SEB; 5	LBH	LGA	DET	WGL; 4	MSP	ELK	COA	PET; 3		10th	116	

Sporting positions
Preceded by Terry Borcheller	Rolex Sports Car Series; Daytona Prototype Champion; 2004; With: Scott Pruett	Succeeded by Max Angelelli; Wayne Taylor
