= Davy Jones (racing driver) =

American racing driver

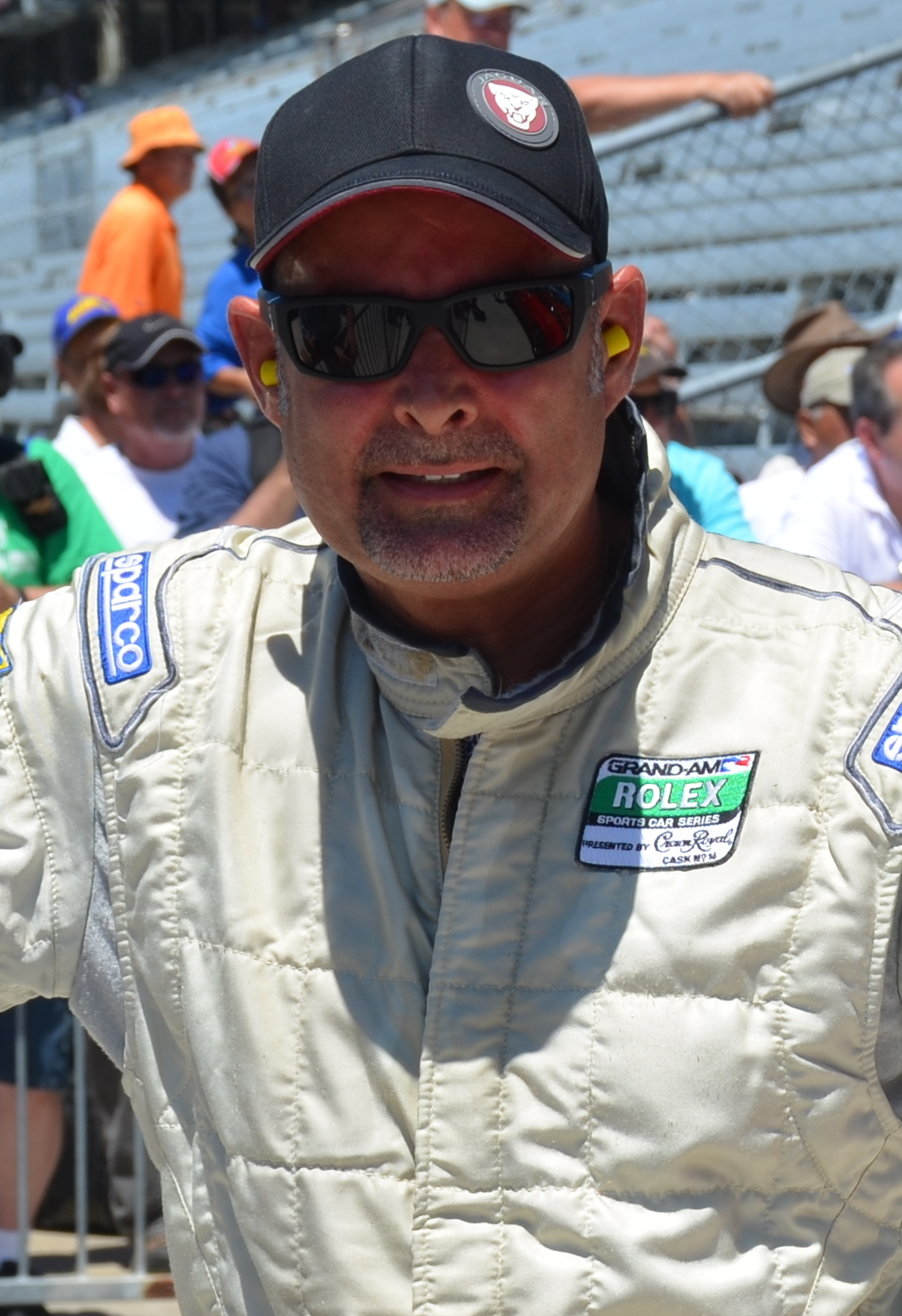
- Jones in 2016
- Nationality: American
- Born: Duane David Jones; June 1, 1964 (age 62) Chicago, Illinois, U.S.

NASCAR Cup Series career
- 7 races run over 1 year
- Best finish: 46th (1995)
- First race: 1995 Daytona 500 (Daytona)
- Last race: 1995 Save Mart Supermarkets 300 (Sears Point)
Wins	Top tens	Poles
0	0	0

NASCAR FedEx Freight Truck Series career
- 2 races run over 2 years
- Best finish: 95th (1995)
- First race: 1995 Heartland Tailgate 175 (Topeka)
- Last race: 1996 Lund Look 225 (Topeka
Wins	Top tens	Poles
0	0	0

IndyCar Series career
- 1 race run over 1 year
- Best finish: 26th (1996)
- First race: 1996 Indianapolis 500 (Indianapolis Motor Speedway)
Wins	Podiums	Poles
0	1	0

Champ Car career
- 16 races run over 6 years
- Best finish: 22nd (1989)
- First race: 1987 Indianapolis 500 (Indianapolis)
- Last race: 1996 Monterey Grand Prix (Laguna Seca)
Wins	Podiums	Poles
0	0	0

24 Hours of Le Mans career
- Years: 1988–1991, 1996
- Teams: Silk Cut Jaguar, Joest Racing
- Best finish: 1st (1996)
- Class wins: 1 (1996)
- Statistics up to date as of September 17, 2014.

Duane David Jones (born June 1, 1964) is an American racing driver. He won the 1996 24 Hours of Le Mans alongside Alexander Wurz and Manuel Reuter.

== Racing career ==
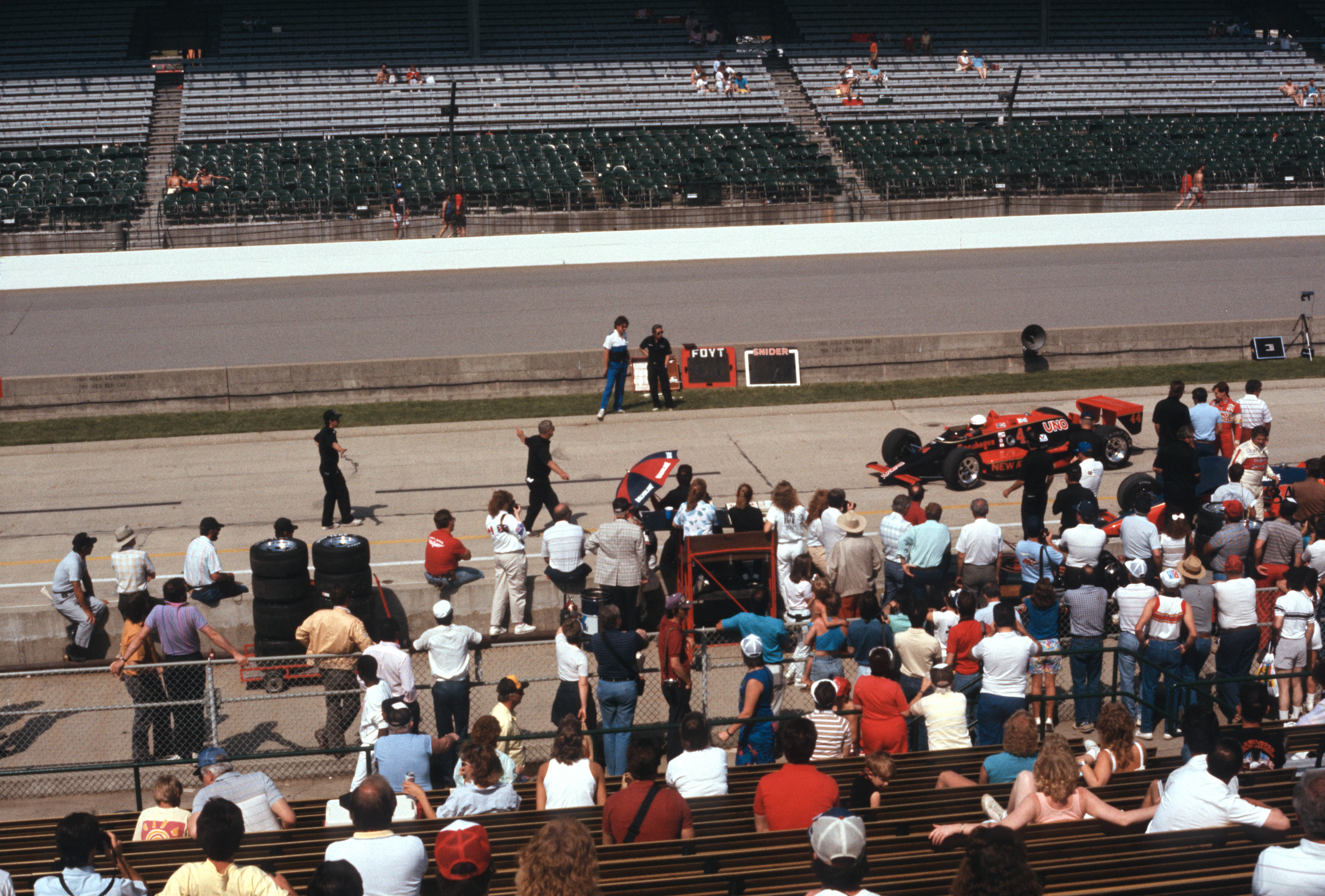
Jones during qualifying for the 1987 Indianapolis 500

In 1983, Jones came third in the British Formula Three Championship behind Ayrton Senna and Martin Brundle. He also that year tested the Brabham F1 car at Brands Hatch with Bernie Ecclestone, the then team owner, looking at Jones as the next American hope for F1 competition. In the mid-1980s, Jones competed in New Zealand Formula Atlantic during the off season and twice won the New Zealand Grand Prix in 1984 and 1987. In 1986, Jones drove for the Factory BMW McLaren Team in IMSA GTP with teammate John Andretti and earned the only BMW GTP victory that season at Watkins Glen. Jones won the 1996 24 Hours of Le Mans with teammates Manuel Reuter and Alexander Wurz in a TWR-Porsche. He also placed second to Buddy Lazier in the 1996 Indianapolis 500, the first of the Indy Racing League era. He has five total starts in the race as well as sixteen starts in CART from 1987 to 1996. Jones also made seven Winston Cup starts in 1995 for Jasper Motorsports with a best finish of twentieth at Darlington Raceway and participated in the 1992 and 1993 editions of the International Race of Champions finishing 8th and 9th respectively. Jones won the 1990 24 Hours of Daytona driving a Jaguar XJR-12, along with Jan Lammers and Andy Wallace.

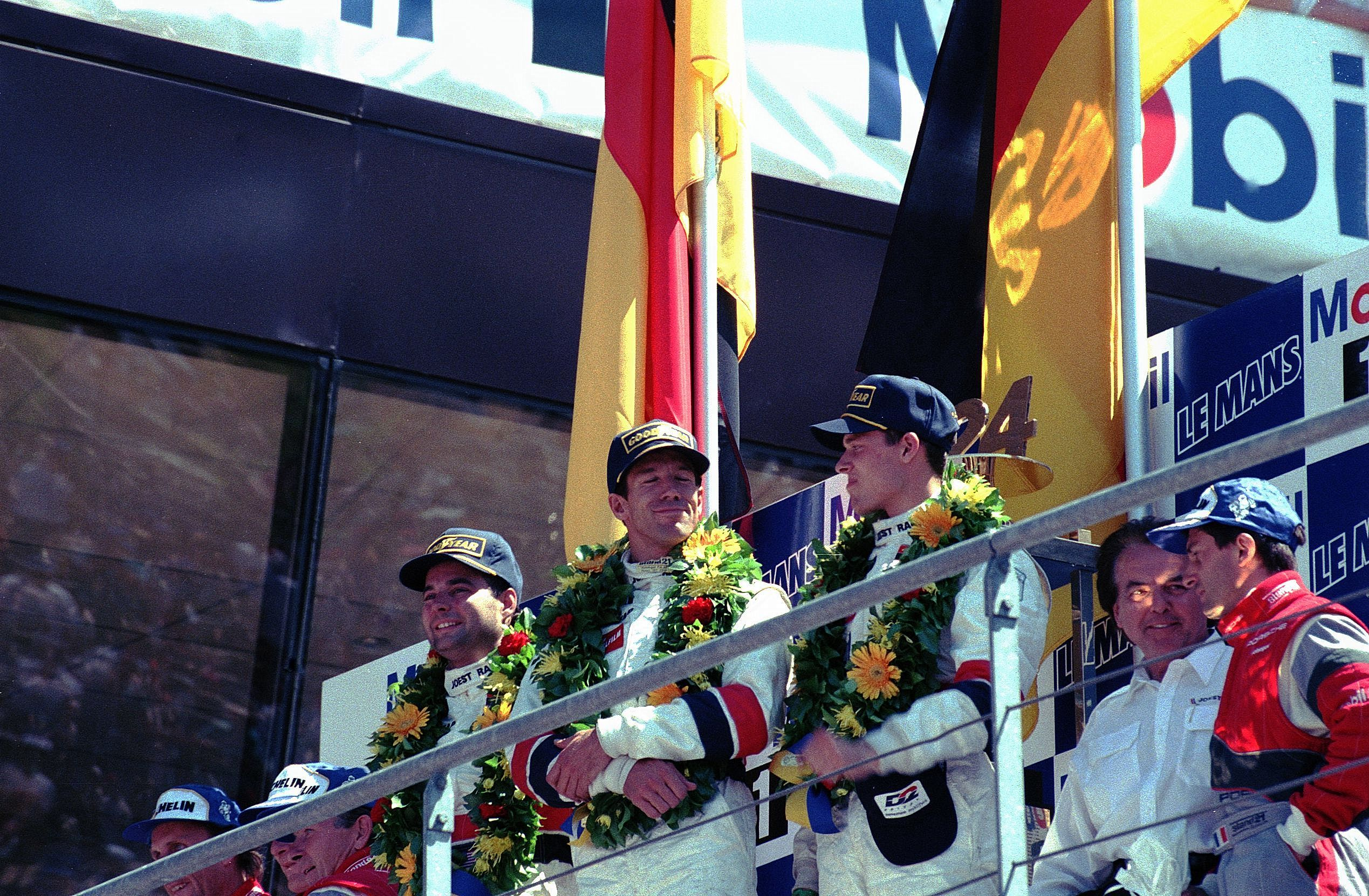
Jones (far left) with teammates Alexander Wurz and Manuel Reuter after winning the 1996 24 Hours of Le Mans

Jones was seriously injured in a practice crash for the IRL race at Walt Disney World Speedway on January 24, 1997. This was the first race where the IRL used their brand new cars with normally aspirated engines. The accident left him with an injured neck, and led to his brief retirement from racing. Jones' withdrawal from the Team Joest squad to compete in the 1997 Le Mans 24 Hours allowed Tom Kristensen to take over the vacant seat, and win his first Le Mans enduro.

Jones has since then competed in sports cars, mainly in the Grand-Am Road Racing Rolex Sports Car Series and Continental Tire Sports Car Challenge. He currently works as a guest speaker, racing advisor, instructor and also runs a driver experience course at a country club in Texas.

== Racing record ==
=== American open–wheel racing results ===
(key)

==== CART ====
Year	Team	1	2	3	4	5	6	7	8	9	10	11	12	13	14	15	16	17	Rank	Points	Ref
1987	A. J. Foyt Enterprises	LBH	PHX	INDY; 28	MIL	POR	MEA	CLE	TOR	MIS; 10	POC	ROA	MDO; 19	NAZ; 14	LS	MIA; 13			35th	3	
1989	Euromotorsport	PHX	LBH	INDY; 7	MIL	DET	POR	CLE	MEA	TOR	MIS	POC	MDO	ROA	NAZ	LS			22nd	6	
1993	Euromotorsport	SRF	PHX	LBH	INDY; 15	MIL	DET	POR	CLE	TOR	MIS	NHM	ROA	VAN	MDO	NAZ	LS		43rd	0	
1994	A. J. Foyt Enterprises	SRF; 19	PHX; 12	LBH; 14															31st	1	
1994	King Racing				INDY; Rpl	MIL	DET	POR	CLE	TOR	MIS	MDO	NHM	VAN	ROA	NAZ	LS		31st	1	
1995	Dick Simon Racing	MIA	SRF	PHX	LBH	NAZ	INDY; 23	MIL	DET	POR	ROA	TOR	CLE	MIS	MDO	NHM	VAN	LS	43rd	0	
1996	Galles Racing	MIA	RIO	SRF	LBH	NAZ	500	MIL	DET	POR	CLE	TOR	MIS; 12	MDO; 16	ROA; 24	VAN; 14	LS; 14		31st	1	

==== Indy Racing League ====
Year	Team	1	2	3	4	5	6	7	8	9	10	11	12	13	14	15	Rank	Points	Ref
1996	Galles Racing	WDW	PHX	INDY; 2													**26th**	**33**	
1996-97	Galles Racing	NHM	LVS	WDW; Wth	PHX	INDY	TXS	PPIR	CLT	NH2	LV2						NC	-	
2000	Team Coulson	WDW	PHX	LVS	INDY; DNQ	TXS	PPIR	ATL	KTY	TX2							NC	-	

==== Indianapolis 500 ====
Year	Chassis	Engine	Start	Finish	Team
1987	March 86C	Ford Cosworth DFX	28	28	A. J. Foyt Enterprises
1989	Lola T88/00	Ford Cosworth DFX	31	7	Euromotorsport
1993	Lola T92/00	Chevrolet 265A	28	15	Euromotorsport
1994	Lola T94/00	Ford XB	Raced by S. Goodyear		King Racing
1995	Lola T95/00	Ford XB	32	23	Dick Simon Racing
1996	Lola T95/00	Mercedes-Benz IC108B	2	2	Galles Racing
2000	G-Force	Oldsmobile	DNQ		Team Coulson

=== NASCAR ===
(key) (Bold – Pole position awarded by qualifying time. Italics – Pole position earned by points standings or practice time. * – Most laps led.)

==== Winston Cup Series ====
NASCAR Winston Cup Series results
Year	Team	No.	Make	1	2	3	4	5	6	7	8	9	10	11	12	13	14	15	16	17	18	19	20	21	22	23	24	25	26	27	28	29	30	31	NWCC	Pts	Ref
1993	Gray Racing	77	Ford	DAY	CAR	RCH	ATL	DAR	BRI	NWS	MAR	TAL	SON	CLT	DOV	POC	MCH	DAY	NHA	POC	TAL	GLN; DNQ	MCH	BRI	DAR	RCH	DOV	MAR	NWS	CLT	CAR	PHO	ATL		NA	-	
1994	U.S. Racing	88	Ford	DAY	CAR	RCH	ATL	DAR	BRI	NWS	MAR	TAL	SON	CLT	DOV	POC	MCH	DAY	NHA	POC	TAL	IND; DNQ	GLN	MCH	BRI	DAR	RCH	DOV	MAR	NWS	CLT	CAR	PHO	ATL	NA	-	
1995	Jasper Motorsports	77	Ford	DAY; 33	CAR; 37	RCH; DNQ	ATL; 24	DAR; 20	BRI; 24	NWS; DNQ	MAR; DNQ	TAL; 33	SON; 36	CLT; DNQ	DOV	POC	MCH	DAY	NHA	POC	TAL	IND	GLN	MCH	BRI	DAR	RCH	DOV	MAR	NWS	CLT	CAR	PHO	ATL	46th	520	

===== Daytona 500 =====
Year	Team	Manufacturer	Start	Finish
1995	Jasper Motorsports	Ford	33	33

==== Craftsman Truck Series ====
NASCAR Craftsman Truck Series results
Year	Team	No.	Make	1	2	3	4	5	6	7	8	9	10	11	12	13	14	15	16	17	18	19	20	21	22	23	24	NCTC	Pts	Ref
1995	Roehrig Motorsports	18	Chevy	PHO	TUS	SGS	MMR	POR	EVG	I70	LVL	BRI	MLW	CNS	HPT; 28	IRP	FLM	RCH	MAR	NWS	SON	MMR	PHO					95th	79	
1996	B&R Racing	9	Chevy	HOM	PHO	POR	EVG	TUS	CNS	HPT; 13	BRI	NZH	MLW	LVL	I70	IRP	FLM	GLN	NSV	RCH	NHA	MAR	NWS	SON	MMR	PHO	LVS	97th	124	

=== Complete 24 Hours of Le Mans results ===
Year	Team	Co-Drivers	Car	Class	Laps	Pos.	Class Pos.
1988	(United Kingdom) Silk Cut Jaguar (United Kingdom) Tom Walkinshaw Racing	(United States) Danny Sullivan (United States) Price Cobb	Jaguar XJR-9LM	C1	331	16th	14th
1989	(United Kingdom) Silk Cut Jaguar (United Kingdom) Tom Walkinshaw Racing	(Republic of Ireland) Derek Daly (United States) Jeff Kline	Jaguar XJR-9LM	C1	85	DNF	DNF
1990	(United Kingdom) Silk Cut Jaguar (United Kingdom) Tom Walkinshaw Racing	(France) Michel Ferté (Chile) Eliseo Salazar	Jaguar XJR-12	C1	282	DNF	DNF
1991	(United Kingdom) Silk Cut Jaguar (United Kingdom) Tom Walkinshaw Racing	(Brazil) Raul Boesel (France) Michel Ferté	Jaguar XJR-12	C2	360	**2nd**	**2nd**
1996	(Germany) Joest Racing	(Austria) Alexander Wurz (Germany) Manuel Reuter	TWR Porsche WSC-95	LMP1	354	**1st**	**1st**

Sporting positions
Preceded by Yannick Dalmas; J.J. Lehto; Masanori Sekiya	Winner of the 24 Hours of Le Mans; 1996 with: Manuel Reuter; Alexander Wurz	Succeeded by Michele Alboreto; Stefan Johansson; Tom Kristensen
