= Raul Boesel =

Brazilian racing driver (born 1957)

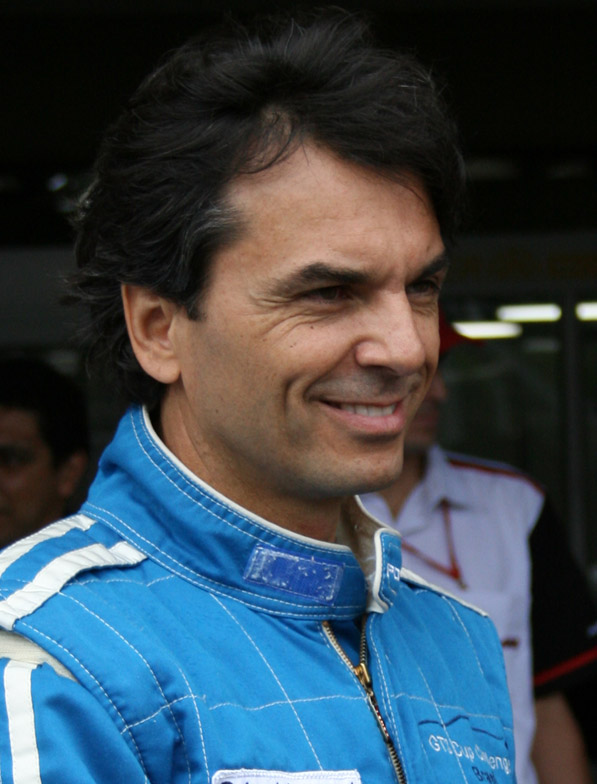
- Boesel at the 2007 Mil Milhas Brasil
- Nationality: (Brazil) Brazilian
- Born: 4 December 1957 (age 68) Curitiba, Brazil
- Teams: March, Ligier
- Championships: 0
- Wins: 0
- Podiums: 0
- Poles: 0
- Fastest laps: 0

Formula One World Championship career
- Active years: 1982 – 1983
- Team(s): March, Ligier
- Entries: 30 (23 starts)
- Championships: 0
- Wins: 0
- Podiums: 0
- Career points: 0
- Pole positions: 0
- Fastest laps: 0
- First entry: 1982 South African Grand Prix
- Last entry: 1983 South African Grand Prix

24 Hours of Le Mans career
- Years: 1987 – 1988, 1991
- Teams: Tom Walkinshaw Racing (Silk Cut Jaguar)
- Best finish: 2nd (1991)
- Class wins: 0

Raul de Mesquita Boesel (Portuguese pronunciation: [ʁaˈuw boˈɛzew], born 4 December 1957) is a Brazilian former racing driver who raced for the March and Ligier Formula One teams and later raced in Champ Car and the Indy Racing League.

Boesel won the 1987 World Sportscar Championship and the 1988 24 Hours of Daytona.

== Personal and early life ==
Boesel was born on 4 December 1957 in Curitiba, Brazil as the son of Jorny and Elizadea de Mesquita Boesel. Boesel had a brief career in equestrian show jumping winning state championships and other competitions.

Since 1988, Boesel resides in Key Biscayne, Florida with his wife Vera and children Raul Boesel Jr and Gabriela. He owns a Cigarette 38 Top Gun boat.

== Career ==
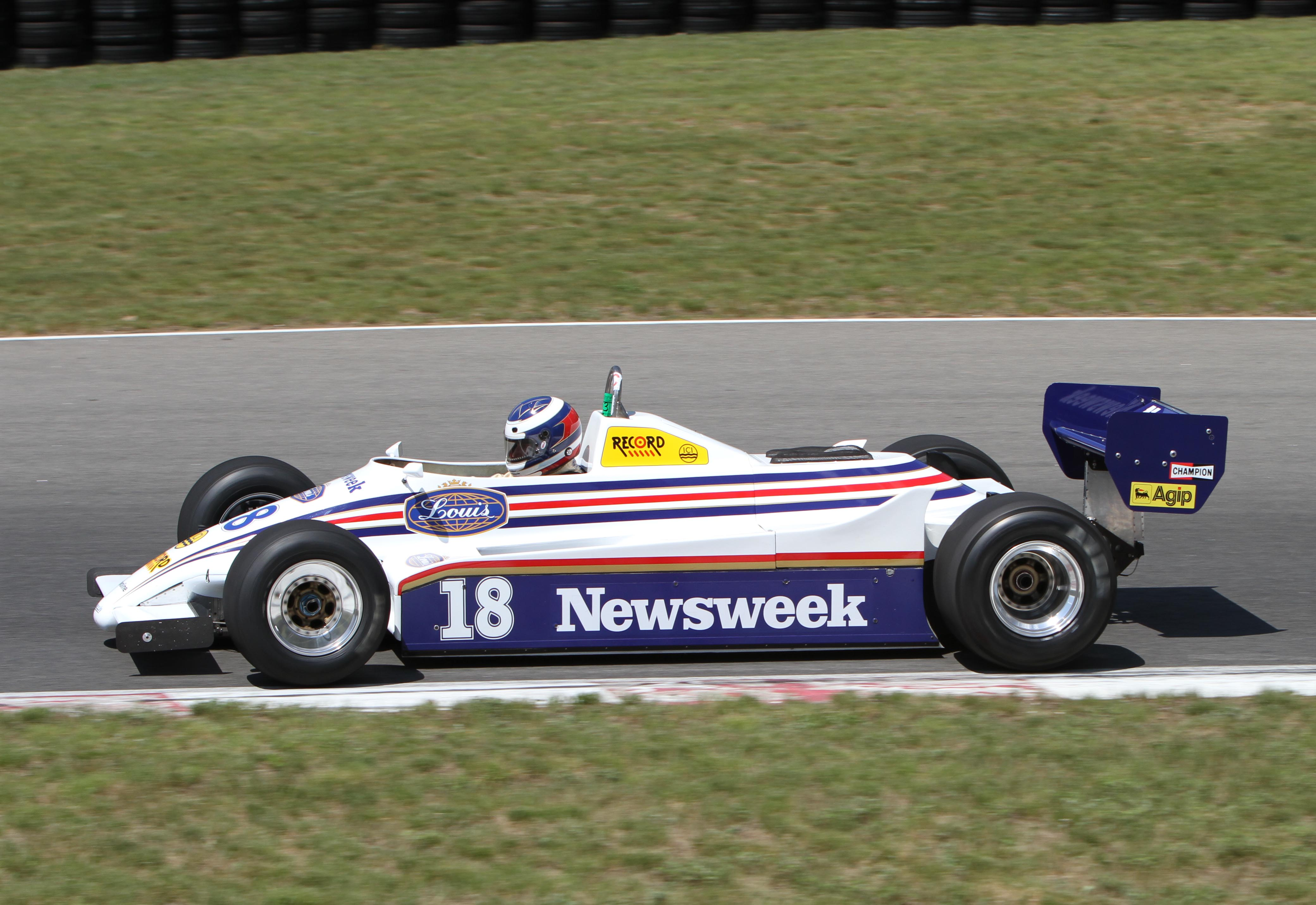
A March 821, formerly driven by Boesel in the 1982 season, being demonstrated at Mont-Tremblant in 2010.

Boesel studied engineering, gave up his degree and went on to motor racing. He entered into the first ever season of the Brazilian Stock Car championship in 1979.

Boesel moved to Britain in 1980 to race in Formula Ford 1600 and in 1981 entered Formula 3 and finished third in the championship. In November 1981, he tested for McLaren and entered the March team, only to switch in 1983 to Ligier. At the end of the year he went to the United States to race in CART.

In 1987, Boesel switched to World Sportscar Championship with Jaguar and won the title with five victories. In 1988. he won the 24 Hours of Daytona in a Jaguar XJR-9, along with Martin Brundle and John Nielsen. That year he also returned to CART and finished third at Indianapolis in 1989. In 1991, he finished second in Le Mans 24 Hours with Jaguar and returned to CART, finishing fifth in the 1993 series, although never winning a race. He raced in CART until 1998, when he went to Indy Racing League. Because of this, he has multiple starts in the Indy 500. His last race in CART was at the 1999 Marlboro 500 at Fontana.

Autódromo Internacional de Curitiba, a racing circuit in Curitiba, is officially nicknamed "Circuito Raul Boesel" (Raul Boesel circuit) in honour of his success in Europe.

Boesel ended his professional racing career in 2005 after returning to Stock Car Brasil, although he still competed in some races after his retirement.

Afterwards, Boesel often commented about various racing categories. In 2007, he started a career as a disc jockey.

== Racing record ==
=== Complete Formula One results ===
(key)

Year	Entrant	Chassis	Engine	1	2	3	4	5	6	7	8	9	10	11	12	13	14	15	16	WDC	Pts
1982	March Grand Prix Team	March 821	Ford Cosworth DFV 3.0 V8	RSA; 15																NC	0
1982	Rothmans March Grand Prix Team	March 821	Ford Cosworth DFV 3.0 V8		BRA; Ret	USW; 9	SMR	BEL; 8	MON; DNPQ	DET; Ret	CAN; Ret	NED; Ret	GBR; DNQ	FRA; DNQ	GER; Ret	AUT; DNQ	SUI; Ret	ITA; DNQ	CPL; 13	NC	0
1983	Équipe Ligier Gitanes	Ligier JS21	Ford Cosworth DFV 3.0 V8	BRA; Ret	USW; 7	FRA; Ret	SMR; 9	MON; Ret	BEL; 13	DET; 10	CAN; Ret	GBR; Ret	GER; Ret	AUT; DNQ	NED; 10	ITA; DNQ	EUR; 15	RSA; NC		NC	0

=== American open-wheel racing ===
(key) (Races in bold indicate pole position; races in italics indicate fastest lap.)

==== CART ====
Year	Team	No.	Chassis	Engine	1	2	3	4	5	6	7	8	9	10	11	12	13	14	15	16	17	18	19	20	Pos.	Pts	Ref
1985	Dick Simon Racing	22	March 85C	Cosworth DFX V8t	LBH; 20	INDY; 18	MIL	POR; 11	MEA; 11	CLE; 12	MCH; 28	ROA; 8	POC	MDO; 23	SAN	MCH	LAG; 20	PHX	MIA; 23						28th	10	
1986	Dick Simon Racing	22	Lola T86/00	Cosworth DFX V8t	PHX; 13	LBH; 19	INDY; 13	MIL; 14	POR; 8	MEA; 23	CLE; 6	TOR; 7	MCH; 5	POC; 5	MDO; 7	SAN; 9	MCH; 15	ROA; 8	LAG; 14	PHX; 13	MIA; 19				13th	54	
1987	Vince Granatelli Racing	4	March 87C	Cosworth DFX V8t	LBH	PHX	INDY	MIL	POR	MEA	CLE	TOR	MCH	POC	ROA	MDO	NAZ	LAG; 16	MIA; 6						26th	8	
1988	Shierson Racing	30	March 88C	Cosworth DFX V8t	PHX; 5	LBH; 4		MIL; 4	POR; 26																8th	89	
1988	Shierson Racing	30	Lola T88/00	Cosworth DFX V8t			INDY; 7			CLE; 5	TOR; 8	MEA; 9	MCH; 11	POC; 5	MDO; 6	ROA; 14	NAZ; 5	LAG; 21	MIA; 22						8th	89	
1989	Shierson Racing	30	Lola T89/00	Judd AV V8t	PHX; 14	LBH; 6	INDY; 3	MIL; 4	DET; 28	POR; 7	CLE; 8	MEA; 6	TOR; 7	MCH; 20	POC; 20	MDO; 23	ROA; 9	NAZ; 11	LAG; 10						11th	68	
1990	Truesports	8	Lola T89/00	Judd AV V8t	PHX; 18	LBH; 8	INDY; 28	MIL; 6	DET; 6	POR; 18	CLE; 20	MEA; 13	TOR; 10	MCH; 9	DEN; 28	VAN; 19	MDO; 9	ROA; 10	NAZ; 8	LAG; 11					11th	42	
1992	Dick Simon Racing	11	Lola T92/00	Chevrolet 265A V8t	SRF	PHX	LBH	INDY; 7	DET; 2	POR; 9	MIL; 10	NHA; 18		MCH; 3											9th	80	
1992	Dick Simon Racing	23	Lola T92/00	Chevrolet 265A V8t									TOR; 22		CLE; 6	ROA; 8	VAN; 11	MDO; 7	NAZ; 6	LAG; 6					9th	80	
1993	Dick Simon Racing	9	Lola T93/00	Ford XB V8t	SRF; 8	PHX; 2	LBH; 12	INDY; 4	**MIL**; 2	DET; 2	POR; 7	CLE; 7	TOR; 7	MCH; 4	NHA; 21	ROA; 4	VAN; 9	MDO; 4	NAZ; 9	LAG; 11					5th	132	
1994	Dick Simon Racing	5	Lola T94/00	Ford XB V8t	SRF; 27	PHX; 8	LBH; 4	INDY; 21	**MIL**; 8	DET; 28	POR; 23	CLE; 6	TOR; 12	MCH; 9	MDO; 8	NHA; 4	VAN; 23	ROA; 6	NAZ; 4	LAG; 2					7th	90	
1995	Rahal-Hogan Racing	11	Lola T95/00	Mercedes-Benz IC108B V8t	MIA; 6	SRF; 8	PHX; 6	LBH; 16	NAZ; 10	INDY; 20	MIL; 11	DET; DNS	POR; 5	ROA; 22	TOR; 6	CLE; 20	MCH; 24	MDO; 20	NHA; 18	VAN; 10	LAG; 12				16th	48	
1996	Team Green	1	Reynard 96i	Ford XB V8t	MIA; 14	RIO; 7	SRF; 13	LBH; 16	NAZ; 21	500; 24	MIL; 26	DET; 8	POR; 28	CLE; 26	TOR; 24	MCH; 7	MDO; 22	ROA; 14	VAN; 23	LAG; 20					22nd	17	
1997	Patrick Racing	40	Reynard 97i	Ford XB V8t	MIA; 17	SRF; 7	LBH; 8	NAZ; 8	RIO; 5	**GAT**; 14	MIL; 4	DET; 6	POR; 3	CLE; 16	TOR; 8	MCH; 18	MDO; 4	ROA; 21	VAN; 6	LAG; 8	FON; 20				10th	91	
1999	Team Green	26	Reynard 99i	Honda HRS V8t	MIA; 27	MOT	LBH	NAZ	RIO	GAT	MIL	POR	CLE	ROA	TOR	MCH	DET	MDO							32nd	1	
1999	All American Racers	36	Eagle 997	Toyota RV8D V8t															CHI; 12	VAN	LAG	HOU	SRF	FON; 17	32nd	1	

==== Indy Racing League ====
Year	Team	Chassis	No.	Engine	1	2	3	4	5	6	7	8	9	10	11	12	13	14	15	Pos.	Pts	Ref
1998	McCormack Motorsports	G-Force GF01B	30	Oldsmobile Aurora V8	WDW; 18	PHX; 8	INDY; 19	TXS; 28	NHA; 19	DOV; 14	CLT; 24	PPR; 25	ATL; 10	TXS; 17	LVS; 18					20th	132	
1999	McCormack Motorsports	G-Force GF01B	30	Oldsmobile Aurora V8	WDW; 5	PHX; 19	CLT; C													23rd	98	
1999	Brant Motorsports	Riley & Scott MkV	3	Oldsmobile Aurora V8				INDY; 12	TXS; 23	PPR; 18	ATL; 11	DOV	PPR	LVS	TXS					23rd	98	
2000	Treadway Racing	G-Force GF01C	5	Oldsmobile Aurora V8	WDW	PHX	LVS	INDY; 16	TXS	PPR	ATL	KTY	TXS							37th	14	
2001	Treadway-Hubbard Racing	G-Force GF01C	5T	Oldsmobile Aurora V8	PHX	HMS	ATL	INDY; Rpl	TXS	PPR	RIR	KAN	NSH	KTY	GAT	CHI	TXS			NC	0	
2002	Team Menard	Dallara IR-02	2	Chevrolet Indy V8	HMS	PHX	FON	NAZ	INDY; 21	TXS; 13	PPR	RIR								19th	158	
2002	Bradley Motorsports	Dallara IR-02	12	Infiniti VRH35ADE V8									KAN; 11	NSH; 5	MCH; 15	KTY; 13	GAT; 8	CHI; 11	TXS; 22	19th	158	

==== Indianapolis 500 ====
Year	Chassis	Engine	Start	Finish	Team
1985	March 85C	Ford Cosworth DFX	23	18	Dick Simon Racing
1986	Lola T86/00	Ford Cosworth DFX	22	13	Dick Simon Racing
1988	Lola T88/00	Ford Cosworth DFX	20	7	Shierson Racing
1989	Lola T89/00	Judd	9	3	Shierson Racing
1990	Lola T89/00	Judd	17	28	Truesports
1992	Lola T92/00	Chevrolet 265A	27	7	Dick Simon Racing
1993	Lola T93/00	Ford XB	3	4	Dick Simon Racing
1994	Lola T94/00	Ford XB	2	21	Dick Simon Racing
1995	Lola T95/00	Mercedes-Benz IC108B	22	20	Rahal-Hogan Racing
1998	G-Force	Oldsmobile	30	19	McCormack Motorsports
1999	Riley & Scott	Oldsmobile	33	12	Brant Racing
2000	G-Force	Oldsmobile	24	16	Treadway-Vertex Cunningham Racing
2001	G-Force	Oldsmobile	Replaced by Felipe Giaffone		Treadway-Hubbard Racing
2002	Dallara	Chevrolet	3	21	Team Menard

=== Complete World Sportscar Championship results ===
(key) (Races in bold indicate pole position) (Races in italics indicate fastest lap)

Year	Entrant	Class	Chassis	Engine	1	2	3	4	5	6	7	8	9	10	11	Pos.	Pts
1982	Dome Co. Ltd.	C	Dome RC82	Cosworth DFL 3.3 V8	MNZ	SIL; Ret	NÜR	LMS	SPA	MUG	FUJ	BRH				NC	0
1987	Silk Cut Jaguar	C1	Jaguar XJR-8	Jaguar 7.0 V12	JAR; 3	JER; 1	MNZ; Ret	SIL; 1		NOR; 4	BRH; 1	NÜR; 1	SPA; 1	FUJ; 2		1st	127
1987	Silk Cut Jaguar	C1	Jaguar XJR-8	Jaguar 6.9 V12					LMS; 5							1st	127
1988	Silk Cut Jaguar	C1	Jaguar XJR-9	Jaguar 7.0 V12	JER	JAR	MNZ	SIL	LMS; Ret	BRN	BRH	NÜR	SPA	FUJ	SAN	NC	0
1990	Konrad Motorsport	C	Porsche 962C	Porsche Type-935 3.0 F6t	SUZ	MNZ; Ret	SIL	SPA	DIJ	NÜR; 11	DON	CGV	MEX			NC	0
1991	Silk Cut Jaguar	C2	Jaguar XJR-12	Jaguar 7.4 V12	SUZ	MNZ	SIL	LMS; 2	NÜR	MAG	MEX	AUT				21st	15

=== 24 Hours of Le Mans results ===
Year	Team	Co-Drivers	Car	Class	Laps	Pos.	Class Pos.
1987	(United Kingdom) Silk Cut Jaguar (United Kingdom) Tom Walkinshaw Racing	(United States) Eddie Cheever (Netherlands) Jan Lammers	Jaguar XJR-8LM	C1	325	5th	5th
1988	(United Kingdom) Silk Cut Jaguar (United Kingdom) Tom Walkinshaw Racing	(United Kingdom) John Watson (France) Henri Pescarolo	Jaguar XJR-9LM	C1	129	DNF	DNF
1991	(United Kingdom) Silk Cut Jaguar (United Kingdom) Tom Walkinshaw Racing	(United States) Davy Jones (France) Michel Ferté	Jaguar XJR-12	C2	360	**2nd**	**2nd**

=== Partial Stock Car Brasil results ===
Year	Team	Car	1	2	3	4	5	6	7	8	9	10	11	12	13	14	Rank	Points
1979	Valvoline Team	Chevrolet Opala	RIO; 6	CUR; 2	INT; 4	LON; 17	MOU; 3	INT; 6	RIO; 3	GUA; 15	BRA; 1	CUR; 1	LON; 5	INT; 21	CUR; 1	CUR; 11	4th	141
2001	Sprint RC	Chevrolet Vectra	RIO; 8	CUR; 11	INT; 16	LON	MOU; 5	INT; 3	RIO; 10	GUA; Ret	BRA; 2	CUR; 10	LON; 12	INT; 17			10th	43
2002	Sprint RC	Chevrolet Vectra	RIO; Ret	CUR; 13	INT; 12	LON	MOU	INT	RIO	GUA	BRA	CUR	LON	INT			23rd	7
2003	Repsol-Boettger	Chevrolet Vectra	CUR; Ret	**MOU**; 2	INT; 17	RIO; 10	LON; DNS	INT; 6	CUR; 4	MOU; 5	RIO; 7	BRA; 10	**CUR**; 4	INT; 6			7th	101
2004	Repsol-Boettger	Chevrolet Astra	CUR; Ret	**INT**; 6	TAR; 2	LON; 2	RIO; 14	INT; 4	CUR; Ret	LON; 10	RIO; 16	BRA; Ret	MOU; 6	INT; 10			6th	88
2005	RR/Embratel Motorsport	Chevrolet Astra	INT; Ret	CUR; Ret	RIO; 22	INT; 15	CUR; 12	LON; 13	BRA; 13	SCZ; Ret	TAR; 23	ARG; 8	RIO; 23	INT; 23			27th	19
2006	WB Motorsport	Volkswagen Bora	INT	CUR	MOU	INT	LON	CUR	SCZ	BRA	TAR; 17	ARG; 19	RIO; 20	INT; 16			NC	0

=== Complete European Le Mans Series results ===
(key) (Races in bold indicate pole position; races in italics indicate fastest lap)

Year	Entrant	Class	Chassis	Engine	1	2	3	4	5	6	Pos.	Pts
2007	Dener Motorsport	GT2	Porsche 997 GT3 RSR	Porsche 3.8L Flat-6	MNZ	VAL	NÜR	SPA	SIL	INT; 5	40th	4

Sporting positions
Preceded by Derek Bell	World Sportscar Championship; Champion; 1987	Succeeded by Martin Brundle
