= 1996 Bank of America 300 =

(United States) 1996 Bank of America 300
Race details
- Race 16 of 16 in the 1996 CART season
- Laguna Seca Raceway
- Date: September 8, 1996
- Official name: Bank of America 300
- Location: Laguna Seca Raceway; Monterey, California
- Course: Permanent road course 2.238 mi / 3.602 km
- Distance: 83 laps 185.754 mi / 298.966 km
- Weather: Dry

Pole position
- Driver: (Italy) Alex Zanardi (Chip Ganassi Racing)
- Time: 1:08.004

Fastest lap
- Driver: (Italy) Alex Zanardi (Chip Ganassi Racing)
- Time: 1:10.148 (on lap 32 of 83)

Podium
- First: (Italy) Alex Zanardi (Chip Ganassi Racing)
- Second: (United States) Bryan Herta (Team Rahal)
- Third: (United States) Scott Pruett (Patrick Racing)

The 1996 Bank of America 300 (Note: The race itself was named the Bank of America 300. However it is retrospectively referred to the 1996 Toyota Grand Prix of Monterey which was the name of the entire event.) was the sixteenth and final round of the 1996 PPG Indy Car World Series season. The race was held on September 8, 1996 at Laguna Seca Raceway.

Championship points leader Jimmy Vasser, Michael Andretti, and Al Unser Jr. came into the weekend mathematically eligible to win the championship. Alex Zanardi won the race from pole position after a daring last-lap overtake on Bryan Herta at the Corkscrew, a downhill left-right corner. In motorsport circles, this move has been eponymously referred to as "The Pass". Named one of the greatest passes in motorsport history, The Pass' legitimacy has been retrospectively debated due to the lack of enforcement of track limits. Vasser finished fourth and won his first and only IndyCar championship.

== Race results ==
Pos.	Grid	No.	Driver	Team	Laps	Time/Status	Points
1	1	4	(Italy) Alex Zanardi	Chip Ganassi Racing	83	1:48:32.157	22
2	2	28	(United States) Bryan Herta	Team Rahal	83	+1.412	16
3	10	20	(United States) Scott Pruett	Patrick Racing	83	+15.754	14
4	5	12	(United States) Jimmy Vasser	Chip Ganassi Racing	83	+16.090	12
5	3	17	(Brazil) Mauricio Gugelmin	PacWest Racing	83	+17.779	10
6	6	99	(Canada) Greg Moore	Forsythe Racing	83	+18.150	8
7	9	18	(United States) Bobby Rahal	Team Rahal	83	+18.870	6
8	16	18	(Denmark) Jan Magnussen	Hogan-Penske Racing	83	+34.806	5
9	11	6	(United States) Michael Andretti	Newman/Haas Racing	82	+ 1 Lap	4
10	8	11	(Brazil) Christian Fittipaldi	Newman/Haas Racing	82	+ 1 Lap	3
11	20	32	(Mexico) Adrián Fernández	Tasman Motorsports	82	+ 1 Lap	2
12	23	34	(Brazil) Roberto Moreno	Payton/Coyne Racing	82	+ 1 Lap	1
13	12	49	(United States) Parker Johnstone	Brix Comptech Racing	82	+ 1 Lap	
14	21	10	(United States) Davy Jones	Galles Racing International	82	+ 1 Lap	
15	15	5	(United States) Robby Gordon	Walker Racing	82	+ 1 Lap	
16	13	2	(United States) Al Unser Jr.	Marlboro Team Penske	82	+ 1 Lap	
17	24	44	(United States) Richie Hearn	Della Penna Motorsports	80	+ 3 Laps	
18	27	15	(Canada) Scott Goodyear	Walker Racing	80	+ 3 Laps	
19	7	31	(Brazil) André Ribeiro	Tasman Motorsports	76	Off course	
20	22	1	(Brazil) Raul Boesel	Brahma Sports Team	69	Electrical	
21	19	16	(Sweden) Stefan Johansson	Bettenhausen Motorsports	52	Crash	
22	17	25	(Italy) Max Papis	Arciero-Wells Racing	39	Engine	
23	26	19	(Japan) Hiro Matsushita	Payton/Coyne Racing	33	Engine	
24	4	21	(United Kingdom) Mark Blundell	PacWest Racing	18	Electrical	
25	14	8	(Brazil) Gil de Ferran	Hall Racing	15	Suspension	
26	25	22	(Mexico) Michel Jourdain Jr.	Team Scandia	15	Exhaust	
27	29	98	(United States) P.J. Jones	All American Racers	15	Engine	
28	28	36	(Argentina) Juan Manuel Fangio II	All American Racers	5	Engine	
29	18	3	(Canada) Paul Tracy	Marlboro Team Penske	2	Crash	
