= 1996 PPG Indy Car World Series =

American motor racing season

1996 Indy Car season
- PPG Indy Car World Series

Season
- Races: 16
- Start date: March 3
- End date: September 8

Awards
- Drivers' champion: (United States) Jimmy Vasser
- Constructors' Cup: (United Kingdom) Reynard
- Manufacturers' Cup: (Japan) Honda
- Nations' Cup: United States
- Rookie of the Year: (Italy) Alex Zanardi

The 1996 PPG Indy Car World Series was the 18th season of the PPG Indy Car World Series, a motor racing series recognized by its sanctioning body, IndyCar, as a top-level formula of American open-wheel car racing. It encompassed the 85th national open-wheel championship season with the rival Indy Racing League (IRL)'s 1996 and 1996–97 seasons. Teams and drivers contested 16 races, starting in Homestead on March 3 and ending in Laguna Seca on September 8, as they competed for the Drivers', Nations', Constructors', and Manufacturers' Championships; each were won by Jimmy Vasser, the United States, Reynard, and Honda. Alex Zanardi took the Jim Trueman Rookie of the Year title.

The PPG Indy Car World Series Drivers' Champion was Jimmy Vasser, whose Honda/Reynard won four of the first six races, including the inaugural US 500. Rookie of the Year was Alex Zanardi. The competition soon starting catching up to Vasser, who had to fend off two late challenges from veterans: Al Unser Jr.'s consistent performance saw him come close to tying Vasser late in the season, but his hopes evaporated after a last-lap crash at Mid-Ohio Sports Car Course and an engine failure while leading on the final turn at Road America. Michael Andretti's resulting victory there and in Vancouver put him in contention at the final race, but a disappointing result at Laguna Seca gave Vasser the championship. Rookie driver Jeff Krosnoff and a course worker died in an accident at the Toronto round, and one week later, Emerson Fittipaldi was in a serious accident at the start of the Marlboro 500 and subsequently retired from IndyCar altogether.

== Teams and drivers ==
The following teams and drivers competed in the 1996 PPG Indy Car World Series:

Team	Chassis	Engine	Tires	No.	Driver	Rounds
Brahma Sports Team	Reynard 96I	Ford-Cosworth XD	G	1	(Brazil) Raul Boesel	All
Marlboro Team Penske	Penske PC-25	Mercedes IC 108C	G	2	(United States) Al Unser Jr.	All
Marlboro Team Penske	Penske PC-25	Mercedes IC 108C	G	3	(Canada) Paul Tracy	1–12, 14–16
Marlboro Team Penske	Penske PC-25	Mercedes IC 108C	G	3	(Denmark) Jan Magnussen	13
Target/Chip Ganassi Racing	Reynard 96I	Honda HRH	F	4	(Italy) Alex Zanardi R	All
Target/Chip Ganassi Racing	Reynard 96I	Honda HRH	F	12	(United States) Jimmy Vasser	All
Walker Racing	Reynard 96I	Ford-Cosworth XD	G	5	(United States) Robby Gordon	All
Walker Racing	Reynard 96I	Ford-Cosworth XB	G	15	(Canada) Scott Goodyear	1–2, 11, 15–16
Walker Racing	Reynard 96I	Ford-Cosworth XB	G	15	(United States) Mike Groff	5
Walker Racing	Reynard 96I	Ford-Cosworth XB	G	15	(Sweden) Fredrik Ekblom	6
Newman/Haas Racing	Lola T96/00	Ford-Cosworth XD	G	6	(United States) Michael Andretti	All
Newman/Haas Racing	Lola T96/00	Ford-Cosworth XD	G	11	(Brazil) Christian Fittipaldi	All
Team Scandia	Lola T96/00	Ford-Cosworth XB	G	7	(Brazil) Marco Greco	1–2
Team Scandia	Lola T96/00	Ford-Cosworth XB	G	7	(Chile) Eliseo Salazar	7, 9, 12–13
Team Scandia	Lola T96/00	Ford-Cosworth XB	G	22	(Mexico) Carlos Guerrero	1–3
Team Scandia	Lola T96/00	Ford-Cosworth XB	G	22	(Mexico) Michel Jourdain Jr. R	4, 7–9, 15–16
Hall Racing	Reynard 96I	Honda HRH	G	8	(Brazil) Gil de Ferran	All
Hogan Penske Racing	Penske PC-25	Mercedes IC 108C	G	9	(Brazil) Emerson Fittipaldi	1–12
Hogan Penske Racing	Penske PC-25	Mercedes IC 108C	G	9	(Denmark) Jan Magnussen R	14–16
Galles Racing International	Lola T96/00	Mercedes IC 108C	G	10	(United States) Eddie Lawson R	1–11
Galles Racing International	Lola T96/00	Mercedes IC 108C	G	10	(United States) Davy Jones	12–16
Bettenhausen Motorsports	Reynard 96I	Mercedes IC 108C	G	16	(Sweden) Stefan Johansson	All
Bettenhausen Motorsports	Penske PC-23	Mercedes IC 108C	G	26	(United States) Gary Bettenhausen	6
PacWest Racing Group	Reynard 96I	Ford-Cosworth XB	G	17	(Brazil) Maurício Gugelmin	All
PacWest Racing Group	Reynard 96I	Ford-Cosworth XB	G	21	(United Kingdom) Mark Blundell R	1–2, 6–16
PacWest Racing Group	Reynard 96I	Ford-Cosworth XB	G	21	(Italy) Teo Fabi	4–5
Team Rahal	Reynard 96I	Mercedes IC 108C	G	18	(United States) Bobby Rahal	All
Team Rahal	Reynard 96I	Mercedes IC 108C	G	28	(United States) Bryan Herta	All
Payton/Coyne Racing	Lola T96/00	Ford-Cosworth XB	F	19	(Japan) Hiro Matsushita	All
Payton/Coyne Racing	Lola T96/00	Ford-Cosworth XB	F	34	(Brazil) Roberto Moreno	All
Patrick Racing	Lola T96/00	Ford-Cosworth XD	F	20	(United States) Scott Pruett	All
Arciero-Wells Racing	Reynard 96I	Toyota RV8A	F	25	(United States) Jeff Krosnoff R	1–11
Arciero-Wells Racing	Reynard 96I	Toyota RV8A	F	25	(Italy) Max Papis R	13–14, 16
Tasman Motorsports Group	Lola T96/00	Honda HRH	F	31	(Brazil) André Ribeiro	All
Tasman Motorsports Group	Lola T96/00	Honda HRH	F	32	(Mexico) Adrián Fernández	All
All American Racers	Eagle MK-V	Toyota RV8A	G	36	(Argentina) Juan Manuel Fangio II R	All
All American Racers	Eagle MK-V	Toyota RV8A	G	98	(United States) P. J. Jones R	6–16
Della Penna Motorsports	Reynard 95I	Ford-Cosworth XB	G	44	(United States) Richie Hearn R	4, 11, 16
Brix Comptech Racing	Reynard 96I	Honda HRH	F	49	(United States) Parker Johnstone	All
Project Indy	Reynard 95I	Ford-Cosworth XB	G	64	(United States) Dennis Vitolo	4
Player's/Forsythe Racing	Reynard 96I	Mercedes IC 108C	F	99	(Canada) Greg Moore R	All

Key
Symbol	Tire manufacturer
F	Firestone
G	Goodyear
Symbol	Driver status
R	Eligible for Rookie of the Year

=== Team changes ===
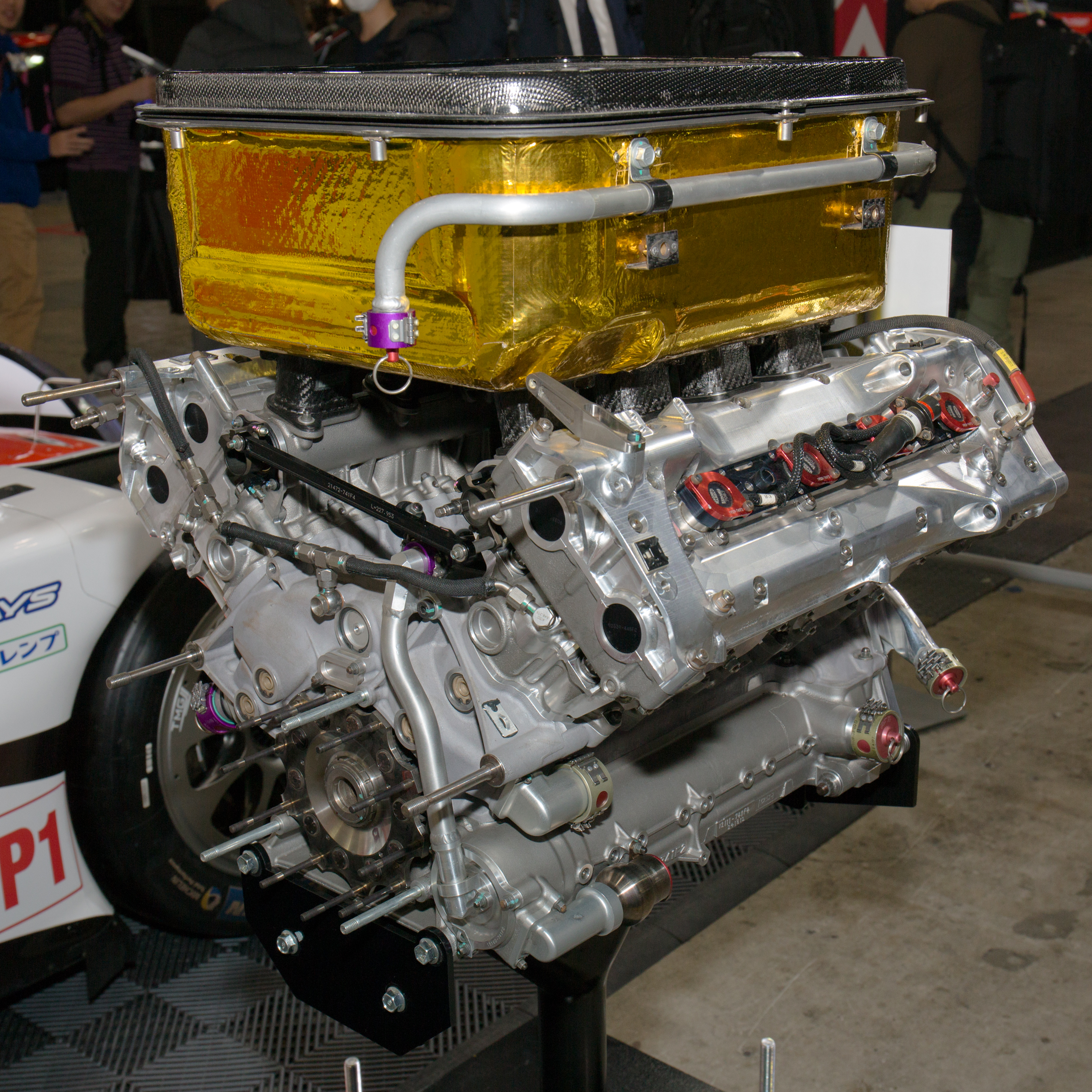
Toyota debuted in the PPG Indy Car World Series with their RV8 engine, which they supplied to Arciero-Wells Racing and All American Racers.

By February 1996, a total of 34 cars were initially entered into the series by 21 different teams. Toyota received approval from IndyCar's board of directors to field engines for a minimum of two cars for their entry to the PPG Indy Car World Series in 1996, as opposed to the two-franchise, three-car regulation that had been enacted prior to the 1994 season. They provided engines to Arciero-Wells Racing and All American Racers, the latter of the two teams hadn't competed in the series since 1986 and was supplying their own Eagle chassis. Following the ITT Automotive Detroit Grand Prix, however, Toyota was required to comply with the mandated three-car rule. Hall Racing switched their engine supplier to Honda for the 1996 season, and Chip Ganassi Racing followed suit after ending their four-year partnership with Ford-Cosworth. The team also switched their tire supplier from Goodyear to Firestone, as did Forsythe Racing, which switched from Ford-Cosworth to Mercedes engines. The Tasman Motorsports Group changed their chassis supplier from Reynard to Lola, while Bettenhausen Racing used Reynard chassis instead of their year-old Penske chassis.

Several teams had been formed, rebranded, or revamped prior to the 1996 season. Trucking magnate Carl Hogan ended his four-year partnership with Team Rahal in favor of a new satellite team associated with Team Penske named Hogan Penske Racing, which received chassis from Penske and engines from Mercedes. However, Team Rahal later found a new partner in late-night talk show host David Letterman. Team Green was rebranded to the Brahma Sports Team in honor of their new sponsorship from Brazilian beer company Brahma. Comptech Racing was renamed to Brix Comptech Racing to reflect their association with IMSA team Brix Racing. Scandia/Simon Racing co-owners Andy Evans and Dick Simon restructured their team in an effort to focus on their individual strengths; Evans bought out the team entirely and formed Team Scandia, while Simon signed a three-year contract as the team's chief engineer and general manager. Project Indy owner Andreas Leberle parted ways with backers Fred Treadway and Jonathan Byrd because their desire to focus exclusively on the Indy Racing League (IRL) conflicted with Leberle's plans to enter races for both premier American open-wheel car racing championships.

A. J. Foyt Enterprises was planning on competing in the IRL and the Indy Car World Series, but withdrew from the latter series after team owner A. J. Foyt filed a $15 million anti-trust suit against IndyCar in January 1996, accusing them of monopolizing the sport and pressuring their teams not to divert to the IRL. Team Scandia fielded cars in both series, while Hemelgarn Racing and Team Menard fully deflected to the IRL because of their extensive experience in the Indianapolis 500.

=== Driver changes ===
Paul Tracy had signed to drive for Newman/Haas Racing in the 1995 season, but the team agreed to allow Team Penske to rehire him for the 1996 season. Despite requests from Newman/Haas Racing co-owner Carl Haas to break the contract and resign with his team, Tracy refused to do so out of fear of getting sued by Team Penske owner Roger Penske, who eventually decided to employ Tracy. Emerson Fittipaldi moved to the Hogan Penske Racing team to maintain his association with Penske following an underwhelming season that saw him fail to contend for the title. At Newman/Haas Racing, Tracy was replaced by Christian Fittipaldi, whose seat at Walker Racing was then taken by Scott Goodyear in his first starts with the team since 1993 after being let go by the Tasman Motorsports Group in favor of Adrián Fernández. The seat at Galles Racing International that Fernández had vacated was then taken by four-time world motorcycle champion Eddie Lawson.

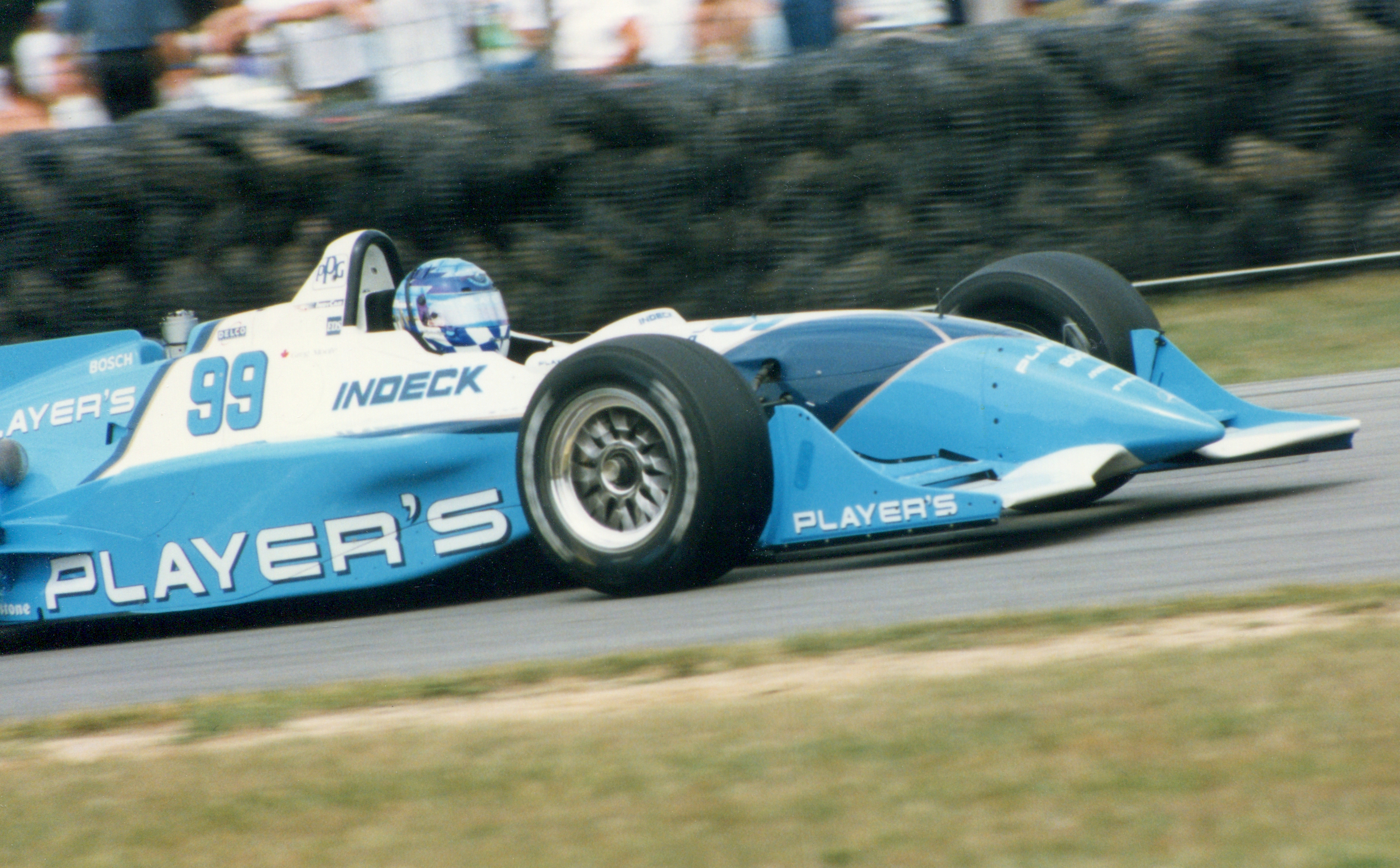
Greg Moore (pictured at the Miller 200) joined the PPG Indy Car World Series with Forsythe Racing.

Raul Boesel was expected to stay with Team Rahal until he suddenly announced his move to the Brahma Sports Team after being approached to do so by Brahma. He took the seat of reigning series champion Jacques Villeneuve, who left the series to race for Formula One's Williams team, and was replaced by Bryan Herta at Team Rahal. Chip Ganassi Racing was thus left without a second driver, so they staged a private test between Japanese Formula 3000 driver Jeff Krosnoff and former Formula One driver Alex Zanardi at the Homestead Motorsports Complex in October 1995. Zanardi's lap times were quicker and more consistent than those of Krosnoff, impressing the team enough to hire him for the season and leaving Krosnoff to race for Arciero-Wells Racing. Hiro Matsushita was resultantly forced to move to Payton/Coyne Racing and teamed with Roberto Moreno, who hadn't regularly competed in the series in a decade.

With Danny Sullivan out of the series after a crash in the previous year's Marlboro 500, Formula One veteran Mark Blundell replaced him at the PacWest Racing Group for his debut Indy Car World Series season. 1995 Indy Lights champion Greg Moore joined the Forsythe Racing team and replaced Teo Fabi, whose loss of sponsorship from Combustion Engineering left him with no ride for the season despite a ninth-place championship result the previous year. Juan Manuel Fangio II, the winningest driver in IMSA GTP history, signed for All American Racers. Fredrik Ekblom was poised to join Brix Comptech Racing, the team with which he won his class in the 1995 24 Hours of Daytona, before he was dropped in favor of Parker Johnstone because the team's sponsor Motorola expressed their preference for an American driver. Because of their relationship with Motorola, the team ran their first full Indy Car World Series season.

==== Mid-season changes ====
Emerson Fittipaldi (pictured in 2015) retired from the Indy Car World Series after a crash in the Marlboro 500.

Two crashes on the weekend of the IndyCar Rio 400 led to the first driver changes of the season. After Goodyear suffered injuries in a practice crash at Rio that kept him out of the series for months, Walker Racing initially had no plans to field their second entry until Goodyear returned, but later hired Mike Groff and Ekblom to take Goodyear's seat in the Bosch Spark Plug Grand Prix and the U.S. 500, respectively. Goodyear came back to compete in the Molson Indy Toronto and the season's final two rounds. Mark Blundell was substituted by Fabi for the Long Beach and Nazareth races because of injuries that he sustained during the Rio event. The PacWest Racing Group did not field a second entry at Surfers Paradise because they felt there was too little time to prepare a car for a different driver.

Neither Marco Greco nor teammate Carlos Guerrero lasted more than three races with Team Scandia. Greco expressed anger at the team's mechanical issues at Rio, having blown three engines throughout the weekend, and threatened to impound their equipment. Although Greco went on to score a championship point, he was fired shortly thereafter and replaced with Eliseo Salazar for four races. After a string of crashes, Guerrero was let go by the team in favor of countryman Michel Jourdain Jr. for six races.

Della Penna Motorsports entered the Indy Car World Series with 1995 Toyota Atlantic champion Richie Hearn for the races at Long Beach, Toronto, and Laguna Seca. Project Indy was unable to secure sponsorship for a full-time campaign in 1996, but fielded a car for Dennis Vitolo at Long Beach after acquiring a year-old Reynard chassis which was converted to fit a Ford-Cosworth engine with assistance from the PacWest Racing Group. Gary Bettenhausen started his first race in three years with Bettenhausen Motorsports at the U.S. 500. P. J. Jones also entered the race, but withdrew and instead made his debut in the Miller Genuine Draft 200 for All American Racers. He went on to complete the rest of the season with the team.

Following Krosnoff's death at Toronto, Max Papis took his seat for three of the final four rounds of the season. Galles Racing International replaced Lawson with Davy Jones starting from the Marlboro 500 to evaluate the car's performance, as the team and Lawson were both displeased over the latter's rate of progress in his rookie season. 1994 British Formula Three titlist Jan Magnussen substituted for Tracy and Emerson Fittipaldi, both of whom had been injured at Michigan. Tracy only missed the Mid-Ohio round, while Fittipaldi sat out the remainder of the season and ultimately never raced again after surviving a plane crash near his farm in Brazil.

== Schedule ==
The 1996 PPG Indy Car World Series schedule was announced on June 11, 1995.

Round	Date	Race	Track	Location
1	March 3	Marlboro Grand Prix of Miami	O Homestead Motorsports Complex	(United States) Homestead, Florida
2	March 17	IndyCar Rio 400	O Emerson Fittipaldi Speedway	(Brazil) Rio de Janeiro, State of Rio de Janeiro
3	March 31	Bartercard IndyCar Australia	S Surfers Paradise Street Circuit	(Australia) Surfers Paradise, Queensland
4	April 14	Toyota Grand Prix of Long Beach	S Long Beach Street Circuit	(United States) Long Beach, California
5	April 28	Bosch Spark Plug Grand Prix	O Nazareth Speedway	(United States) Nazareth, Pennsylvania
6	May 26	U.S. 500	O Michigan International Speedway	(United States) Brooklyn, Michigan
7	June 2	Miller Genuine Draft 200	O Milwaukee Mile	(United States) West Allis, Wisconsin
8	June 9	ITT Automotive Detroit Grand Prix	S Raceway on Belle Isle Park	(United States) Detroit, Michigan
9	June 23	Budweiser/G.I. Joe's 200	R Portland International Raceway	(United States) Portland, Oregon
10	June 30	Medic Drug Grand Prix of Cleveland	R Cleveland Burke Lakefront Airport	(United States) Cleveland, Ohio
11	July 14	Molson Indy Toronto	S Exhibition Place	(Canada) Toronto, Ontario
12	July 28	Marlboro 500	O Michigan International Speedway	(United States) Brooklyn, Michigan
13	August 11	Miller 200	R Mid-Ohio Sports Car Course	(United States) Lexington, Ohio
14	August 18	Texaco/Havoline 200	R Road America	(United States) Elkhart Lake, Wisconsin
15	September 1	Molson Indy Vancouver	S Concord Pacific Place	(Canada) Vancouver, British Columbia
16	September 8	Bank of America 300	R Laguna Seca Raceway	(United States) Monterey, California

Key
Symbol	Track type
O	Oval track
R	Road course
S	Street circuit

=== Schedule changes ===
The most notable exclusion from the schedule was the Indianapolis 500, which had been moved to the IRL. Phoenix International Raceway and New Hampshire International Speedway also deflected to the rival league. In response to new rules implemented by the IRL that prevented IndyCar competitors from racing in the 80th Indianapolis 500, IndyCar staged a 500 mi (800 km) race on the same day at Michigan International Speedway, named the U.S. 500.

Two tracks debuted on the series' calendar in 1996. After one year on the Bicentennial Park street circuit, the Grand Prix of Miami was moved to the newly-built Homestead Motorsports Complex. The IndyCar Rio 400 at the Emerson Fittipaldi Speedway was added to capitalize on the series' increasing amount of Brazilian drivers, but because of IndyCar's agreement with the Fédération Internationale de l'Automobile (FIA; motorsports' international governing body) to avoid hosting road course events outside of the United States, a trapezoid-shaped oval was built on the grounds of the circuit. The event seemed to be in jeopardy less than a month before it was scheduled to commence when IndyCar Vice President of Competition Kirk Russell deemed the circuit "unusable" because of its poorly-paved track surface, but the circuit was completed with less than a week before the race and received praise from drivers.

== Background ==
=== Formation of Indy Racing League ===
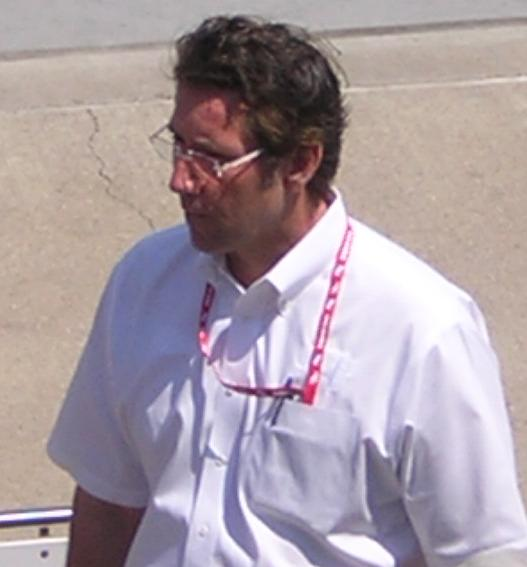
Tony George (pictured in 2007) formed the Indy Racing League and prevented IndyCar teams from competing in the 80th Indianapolis 500 with the 25/8 rule.

Indianapolis Motor Speedway president Tony George joined IndyCar (then known as Championship Auto Racing Teams (CART))'s board of directors in July 1992, but resigned in January 1994 due to his displeasure over the direction of the sport. Several months later, he announced the creation of the IRL, which was meant to serve as a more affordable alternative to the Indy Car World Series and exclusively featured oval track races, including the Indianapolis 500, the series' marquee event, to draw in American drivers with grassroots short track racing experience. This led to a schism between the two American open-wheel car racing leagues which is commonly referred to as the CART–IRL split.

After IndyCar revealed that their Road America race would conflict with the IRL's New Hampshire event, George instituted a rule, known as the 25/8 rule, which ensured that 25 of the 33 starting positions for the Indianapolis 500 would be occupied by IRL entrants. Enraged by the new regulation, IndyCar team owners and officials sought a race that could showcase their drivers and sponsors in order to embarrass the IRL on its biggest stage. The U.S. 500 was thus announced in December 1995 to be held in direct competition with the 80th Indianapolis 500, and was advertised with the slogan: "The real cars, the real stars." To build prestige for the new event, the winner of the race would receive $1 million and the Vanderbilt Cup, the first trophy ever awarded in American motor racing history. A meeting between George and Penske to try and reach an agreement between IndyCar and the IRL in February 1996 spurred rumors of the U.S. 500 being cancelled, which were quickly dispelled by Penske.

At the end of the year, the Indy Car World Series' governing body lost permission to continue using the IndyCar trademark that had been leased to them by the Indianapolis Motor Speedway and reverted to their original brand name, CART, for the 1997 season onward.

=== Rule changes ===
==== Technical ====
For 1996, the chassis penetration resistance was increased by 43 percent in order to give more car control to the drivers. The under-wing exit was decreased from 43 by 6 inches (1,090 by 150 mm) to 35 by 6 inches (890 by 150 mm). The minimum clearance of bodywork around the rear tire was increased from 1.25 inches (32 mm) to 4 inches (100 mm). Restrictions were also placed on the placement of rear brake scoops on all tracks, front wings and sidepods for the short ovals and road courses, and the rear wing angle for superspeedways. The new regulations were expected to reduce downforce by about 30 percent.

==== Safety advancements ====
To improve driver safety, the thickness of the chassis' outer body around the driver's torso increased from 0.07 inches (1.8 mm) to 0.1 inches (2.5 mm), and the sidepods' mandated height was also boosted from 12 inches (300 mm) to at least 14 inches (360 mm) through the usage of aluminum or nomex honeycomb. Roll bar and cockpit padding were both heightened and cockpit side panels were added to soften impacts in high-speed crashes and reduce head and neck trauma; the minimum required height of the panels was to the mid-point of the driver's helmet.

==== Sporting ====
Several rules were implemented starting from the U.S. 500. Immediately after a caution flag, pit road was closed until the pace car bunched up the field, after which the cars on the lead lap would be allowed to make pit stops, followed by lapped cars the following lap. During restarts, lead-lap cars would be aligned on the high side of the track and lapped cars on the low side. Stop-and-go penalties were replaced with drive-through penalties.

== Season report ==
=== Pre-season testing ===
A pre-season test titled Spring Training was conducted at the Homestead Motorsports Complex from Monday, February 5 to Friday, February 9. The sessions on Monday, Tuesday, Wednesday morning, and Friday took place on the track's oval circuit, while the sessions on Wednesday afternoon and Thursday occurred on the road course configuration. Jimmy Vasser was the only driver to exceed the 195 mph (314 km/h) mark, setting the top lap speed of 195.938 mph (315.332 km/h) within the waning minutes of the last session.

=== Opening rounds ===
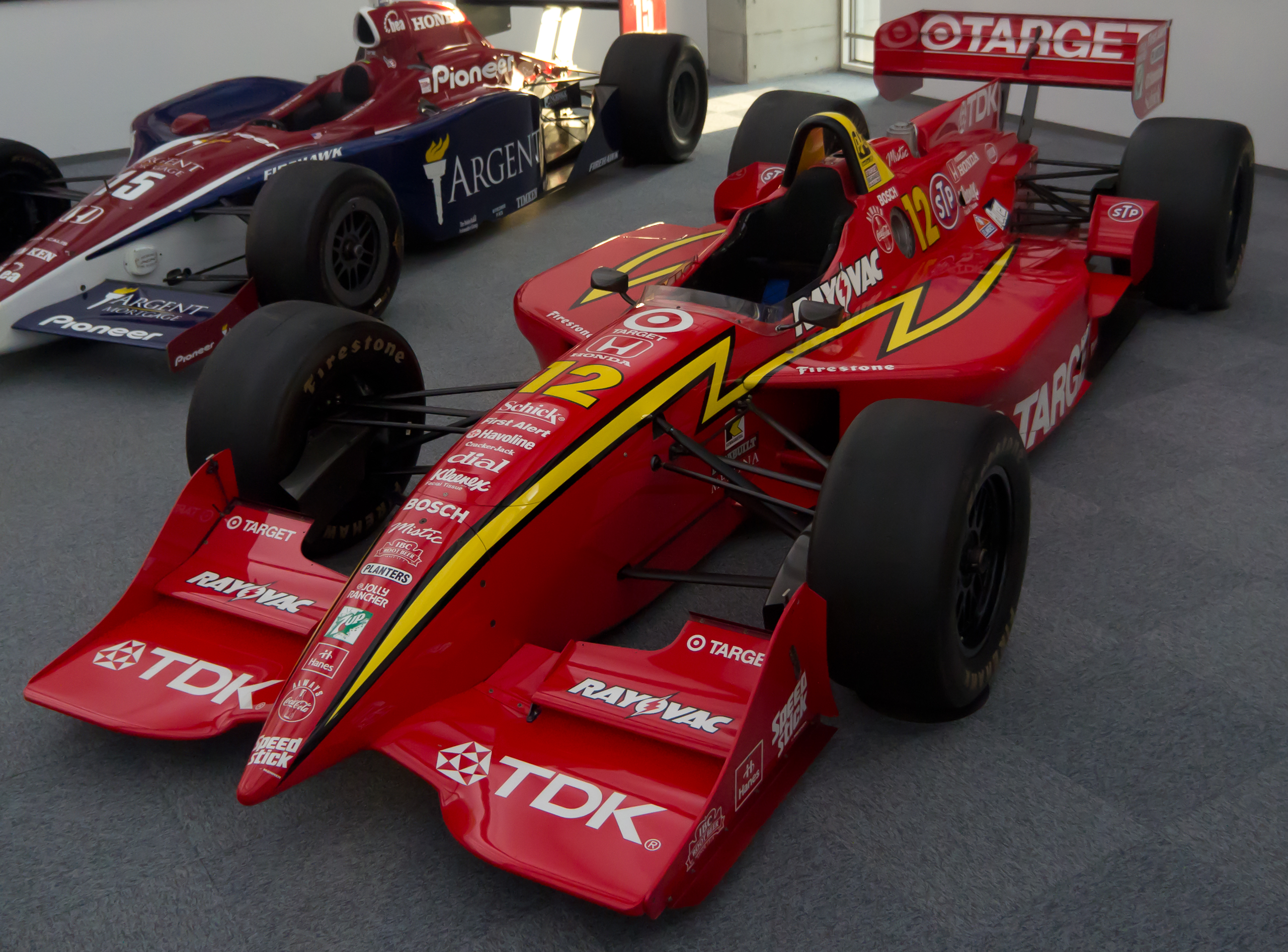
The Reynard 96I won the Constructors' Cup and was used by Jimmy Vasser to win his sole Drivers' Championship.

Rain significantly affected the weekend of the season-opening Marlboro Grand Prix of Miami, forcing the qualifying session to be moved to the day of the race for the first time since 1987 and prompting a red flag on the 33rd lap. Tracy set the pace in every preliminary session of the weekend, including qualifying for the pole position, and opened margins of up to six seconds over his fellow competitors until a lap-84 caution flag for debris on the track gave drivers an opportunity to make their final pit stops. As Tracy exited his stall, he was suddenly pulled back with a broken transmission and retired from the race. Gil de Ferran subsequently assumed the lead, but he was mired behind slower traffic on the last restart and passed by Vasser, who led the rest of the race to take his first career victory. De Ferran came in second, and Robby Gordon beat Scott Pruett to the finish line by 0.004 seconds for third place. Zanardi ran as high as fifth place in his debut start before his left-rear tire loosened under caution, sending him spinning into the wall. Johnstone was not medically cleared to start the race after getting concussed in a practice crash.

The inaugural IndyCar Rio 400 saw drivers struggle to adapt to the slippery surface of the Emerson Fittipaldi Speedway, with Goodyear and Christian Fittipaldi being hospitalized in separate practice accidents. Zanardi led teammate Vasser and André Ribeiro to his maiden pole position. He maintained the lead for 59 of the first 60 laps before pitting under a caution period, allowing de Ferran to assume his position until he ran out of fuel and slowed to a halt on the 80th lap. Zanardi and Al Unser Jr. moved through the field before losing several positions during the second cycle of green-flag pit stops, leaving Moore and Ribeiro to contend for the win. Ribeiro lost the lead to Moore after over-braking at the last corner on a restart, but reclaimed the position when Moore's engine failed 18 laps shy of the finish. After Gordon crashed on the 124th lap, Rebeiro successfully fended off Unser and Pruett in the final four-lap stint to achieve an emotional victory at his home country. The track's namesake driver, Emerson Fittipaldi, ran out of fuel on lap 61 and finished in 11th, two laps behind the leaders. Blundell suffered a brake failure and slammed the turn-four concrete wall at 196 mph (315 km/h) on the tenth lap; the injuries he sustained forced him to miss the next three rounds.

Ahead of the Bartercard IndyCar Australia, Firestone racing director Al Speyer revealed his company had made "significant gains in our street course tires over the winter," which was made evident as Vasser took his first career pole position by a scant 0.017 seconds over Pruett and went on to lead 60 of 65 laps en route to his second victory, which gave him the Drivers' Championship lead. Vasser had to make an extra pit stop because his faulty refueling system prevented him from taking on a full load of fuel, but Pruett was unable to take advantage of Vasser's hindrance due to concerns over his engine's fuel consumption. He still finished in second place, while Moore claimed his first podium result in third and Maurício Gugelmin recovered from dropping to 19th after spinning on lap 24 to finish fourth.

At the next round, the Toyota Grand Prix of Long Beach, an engine failure from Gordon late in the final qualifying session ensured de Ferran the pole position over Chip Ganassi Racing teammates Zanardi and Vasser. De Ferran was largely unchallenged throughout the race, but his bid for a win was ruined when his hose clamp loosened on the 101st lap, which depleted his engine's horsepower. His mechanical issue allowed Vasser to assume the lead for the final four laps to take his third win in four races, padding out his championship lead to 23 points over Pruett, who was hindered by a broken ignition coil. Johnstone, in second, earned his and his team's first podium result, while de Ferran was demoted to fifth place and said that the race was "the biggest disappointment in my career." The race also saw controversy down the finishing order. Tracy, Gordon, and Gugelmin wore a satirical shirt at the pre-race drivers' meeting which read "Michael Andretti's Driving School for the Blind". Andretti was later placed on probation for the rest of the season for collisions with Tracy at Surfers Paradise and the PacWest Racing drivers at Long Beach, while Newman/Haas and PacWest Racing were each fined $5,000 for a post-race fight between the team's pit crews. Christian Fittipaldi was also levied a $5,000 fine for shoving Moore after they both crashed in the seventh turn.

Tracy took the pole position for the Bosch Spark Plug Grand Prix with the fastest lap on a 1 mi (1.6 km) circuit in motor racing history, leading Emerson Fittipaldi to a one-two qualifying result for Penske chassis for the first time since the same event in 1994. He maintained command of the race until he skidded into the pit wall during his first stop on lap 82, injuring three of his crewmen in the process, which allowed Andretti to take the lead despite stalling on pit road two laps prior. From there, Andretti led for the remainder of the race to earn the first win of the season for him and Goodyear tires at his home track, Nazareth Speedway. Moore, who turned 21 years old on the Monday before the race, overtook Unser and Emerson Fittipaldi within the final ten laps to finish second. Tracy passed Rahal for fifth place at the final corner on the final lap, though he expressed remorse for hitting members of his pit crew. Vasser struggled with speed throughout the race and came in seventh, shrinking his championship lead to 20 points over Unser; Pruett had been demoted to third in the standings because of his eighth-place finish.

=== Mid-season rounds ===
The sixth round of the season was the inaugural U.S. 500, which was treated as the series' premier event to protest new rules instituted for the 80th Indianapolis 500. The month of May was dampened by verbal attacks between members of IndyCar and the IRL as they sought to gain prevalence as the most prestigious championship in American open-wheel car racing. Preliminary on-track activities for the U.S. 500 began with a one-day rookie orientation test on May 9. Two days later, Vasser took advantage of overcast weather conditions to qualify on the pole position for the race, despite being hindered by mechanical issues in a practice session the day prior. As the field approached the race start in three-abreast formation, however, contact between Fernández and Vasser sent the latter spinning into Herta, setting off a 12-car pileup that ended up overshadowing the race.

== Results and standings ==
=== Races ===
Round	Race	Pole position	Fastest lap	Race winner				Report
Round	Race	Pole position	Fastest lap	Driver	Team	Chassis	Engine	Report
1	(United States) Homestead	(Canada) Paul Tracy	(Canada) Greg Moore	(United States) Jimmy Vasser	Target/Chip Ganassi Racing	Reynard	Honda	Report
2	(Brazil) Rio	(Italy) Alex Zanardi	(Brazil) Gil de Ferran	(Brazil) André Ribeiro	Tasman Motorsports Group	Lola	Honda	Report
3	(Australia) Surfers Paradise	(United States) Jimmy Vasser	(United States) Jimmy Vasser	(United States) Jimmy Vasser	Target/Chip Ganassi Racing	Reynard	Honda	Report
4	(United States) Long Beach	(Brazil) Gil de Ferran	(Canada) Paul Tracy	(United States) Jimmy Vasser	Target/Chip Ganassi Racing	Reynard	Honda	Report
5	(United States) Nazareth	(Canada) Paul Tracy	(Brazil) Emerson Fittipaldi	(United States) Michael Andretti	Newman/Haas Racing	Lola	Ford	Report
6	(United States) Michigan 1	(United States) Jimmy Vasser	(Italy) Alex Zanardi	(United States) Jimmy Vasser	Target/Chip Ganassi Racing	Reynard	Honda	Report
7	(United States) Milwaukee	(Canada) Paul Tracy	(United States) Michael Andretti	(United States) Michael Andretti	Newman/Haas Racing	Lola	Ford	Report
8	(United States) Belle Isle	(United States) Scott Pruett	(Brazil) Christian Fittipaldi	(United States) Michael Andretti	Newman/Haas Racing	Lola	Ford	Report
9	(United States) Portland	(Italy) Alex Zanardi	(Italy) Alex Zanardi	(Italy) Alex Zanardi	Target/Chip Ganassi Racing	Reynard	Honda	Report
10	(United States) Cleveland	(United States) Jimmy Vasser	(United States) Jimmy Vasser	(Brazil) Gil de Ferran	Jim Hall Racing	Reynard	Honda	Report
11	(Canada) Toronto	(Brazil) André Ribeiro	(Italy) Alex Zanardi	(Mexico) Adrián Fernández	Tasman Motorsports Group	Lola	Honda	Report
12	(United States) Michigan 2	(United States) Jimmy Vasser	(Mexico) Adrián Fernández	(Brazil) André Ribeiro	Tasman Motorsports Group	Lola	Honda	Report
13	(United States) Mid-Ohio	(Italy) Alex Zanardi	(Italy) Alex Zanardi	(Italy) Alex Zanardi	Target/Chip Ganassi Racing	Reynard	Honda	Report
14	(United States) Road America	(Italy) Alex Zanardi	(Canada) Paul Tracy	(United States) Michael Andretti	Newman/Haas Racing	Lola	Ford	Report
15	(Canada) Vancouver	(Italy) Alex Zanardi	(Italy) Alex Zanardi	(United States) Michael Andretti	Newman/Haas Racing	Lola	Ford	Report
16	(United States) Laguna Seca	(Italy) Alex Zanardi	(Italy) Alex Zanardi	(Italy) Alex Zanardi	Target/Chip Ganassi Racing	Reynard	Honda	Report

=== Scoring system ===
Points were awarded to the top 12 finishers, the pole-sitter, and the driver who led the most laps of each race using the following structure:

Position	**1st**	**2nd**	**3rd**	**4th**	**5th**	**6th**	**7th**	**8th**	**9th**	**10th**	**11th**	**12th**	**Pole**	**Most laps led**
Points	20	16	14	12	10	8	6	5	4	3	2	1	1	1

=== Drivers' Championship standings ===
Pos.	Driver	HOM (United States)	RIO (Brazil)	SUR (Australia)	LBH (United States)	NAZ (United States)	MIS1 (United States)	MIL (United States)	BEL (United States)	POR (United States)	CLE (United States)	TOR (Canada)	MIS2 (United States)	MOH (United States)	ROA (United States)	VAN (Canada)	LAG (United States)	Points
1	(United States) Jimmy Vasser	1	8	**1***	1	7	**1**	10	12	13	**10**	8	**9**	2	6	7	4	154
2	(United States) Michael Andretti	9	22	19	7	1*	23	1	1	11	19	22	22	3	1	1*	9	132
3	(Italy) Alex Zanardi RY	24	**4***	21	24	13	17*	13	11	**1***	2	2*	21	**1***	**3**	**26**	**1***	132
4	(United States) Al Unser Jr.	8	2	9	3	3	8	2*	22	4	4	13	4	13	10*	5	16	125
5	(Brazil) Christian Fittipaldi	6	5	5	21	9	12	6	2*	3	7	7	10	7	16	3	10	110
6	(Brazil) Gil de Ferran	2	10	11	**5***	23	9	9	3	2	1*	18	19	17	25	4	25	104
7	(United States) Bobby Rahal	5	6	20	14	6	19	7	21	6	15	3	24	5	2	2	7	102
8	(United States) Bryan Herta	10	13	17	12	11	15	14	13	26	5	6	2	4	5	6	2	86
9	(Canada) Greg Moore R	7	18	3	22	2	13	5	20	25	3	4	17	9	23	25	6	84
10	(United States) Scott Pruett	4	3	2	11	8	26	12	**10**	23	8	10	13	21	7	20	3	82
11	(Brazil) André Ribeiro	16	1	8	27	12	4	8	24	7	20	**21**	1*	8	19	21	19	76
12	(Mexico) Adrián Fernández	11	14	23	6	10	DNS	11	4	12	6	1	20	6	13	8	11	71
13	(Canada) Paul Tracy	**23***	19	22	4	**5**	7	**3**	17	27	9	5	Wth		12	18	29	60
14	(Brazil) Maurício Gugelmin	26	25	4	15	15	2	15	16	16	21	12	3	26	21	24	5	53
15	(Sweden) Stefan Johansson	19	23	6	19	19	16	27	7	9	12	17	5	11	4	17	21	43
16	(United Kingdom) Mark Blundell R	17	27				5	22	5	8	11	11	6	10	20	12	24	41
17	(United States) Parker Johnstone	Wth	16	24	2	20	11	16	14	5	25	26	18	12	11	11	13	33
18	(United States) Robby Gordon	3	15	16	13	22	20	17	26	10	18	9	8	18	17	10	15	29
19	(Brazil) Emerson Fittipaldi	13	11	25	20	4	10	4	25	20	22	14	25					29
20	(United States) Eddie Lawson R	15	21	7	9	17	6	20	6	15	24	15						26
21	(Brazil) Roberto Moreno	27	9	12	8	24	3	25	23	19	14	23	23	23	22	27	12	25
22	(Brazil) Raul Boesel	14	7	13	16	21	24	26	8	28	26	24	7	22	14	23	20	17
23	(Argentina) Juan Manuel Fangio II	21	17	15	25	25	22	19	18	14	13	28	14	20	8	19	28	5
24	(Denmark) Jan Magnussen R													14	26	22	8	5
25	(Canada) Scott Goodyear	12	Wth									19				9	18	5
26	(United States) P. J. Jones R						DNP**1**	24	9	24	23	20	16	25	18	13	27	4
27	(Italy) Max Papis R													24	9		22	4
28	(Japan) Hiro Matsushita	18	24	10	28	26	14	28	19	21	17	27	15	19	15	15	23	3
29	(United States) Richie Hearn R				10							25					17	3
30	(Chile) Eliseo Salazar							21		18			11	15				2
31	(United States) Davy Jones												12	16	24	14	14	1
32	(Brazil) Marco Greco	25	12															1
33	(Mexico) Carlos Guerrero	20	20	14														0
34	(United States) Mike Groff					14												0
35	(United States) Jeff Krosnoff R	22	26	18	26	18	18	18	15	17	16	162						0
36	(Italy) Teo Fabi				18	16	DNP**1**											0
37	(Mexico) Michel Jourdain Jr. R				23			23	DNS	22						16	26	0
38	(United States) Dennis Vitolo				17													0
39	(United States) Gary Bettenhausen						21											0
40	(Sweden) Fredrik Ekblom R						25											0
Pos.	Driver	HOM (United States)	RIO (Brazil)	SUR (Australia)	LBH (United States)	NAZ (United States)	MIS1 (United States)	MIL (United States)	BEL (United States)	POR (United States)	CLE (United States)	TOR (Canada)	MIS2 (United States)	MOH (United States)	ROA (United States)	VAN (Canada)	LAG (United States)	Points

Color	Result
Gold	Winner
Silver	2nd place
Bronze	3rd place
Green	4th–6th place
Light Blue	7th–12th place
Dark Blue	Non-points finish
Purple	Did not finish
Red	Did not qualify (DNQ)
Brown	Withdrawn (Wth)
Black	Disqualified (DSQ)
White	Did not start (DNS)
Blank	Did not participate

**In-line notation**
**Bold**	Pole position
Italics	Ran fastest race lap
*	Led most race laps
RY	Rookie of the Year
R	Rookie

Notes:

- ^{1} P. J. Jones and Teo Fabi are registered in the official results for the U.S. 500 as 'withdrawn', but their withdrawal before the start of practice meant that they did not compete in any of the official sessions.
- ^{2} Jeff Krosnoff died in an accident at the Molson Indy Toronto.

=== Nations' Cup standings ===
- Top result per race counts towards Nations' Cup.

Pos	Country	Pts
1	United States	282
2	Brazil	206
3	Italy	120
4	Canada	111
5	Mexico	71
6	Sweden	43
7	United Kingdom	41
8	Argentina	5
9	Denmark	5
10	Japan	3
11	Chile	2
Pos	Country	Pts

=== Chassis Constructors' Cup ===
Pos	Chassis	Pts	Wins
1	(United Kingdom) Reynard 96I	276	8
2	(United Kingdom) Lola T9600	260	8
3	(United States) Penske PC-25/PC-23	139	0
4	(United States) Eagle MK V/96	9	0
Pos	Chassis	Pts	Wins

=== Engine Manufacturers' Cup ===
Pos	Engine	Pts	Wins
1	(Japan) Honda	271	11
2	(United States) Ford XD/XB	234	5
3	(Germany) Mercedes	218	0
4	(Japan) Toyota	9	0
Pos	Engine	Pts	Wins

== Bibliography ==
- Shaw, Jeremy, ed. (1996). Indycar 1996-97: Autocourse Indy Car Yearbook. Richmond, Surrey: Hazleton Publishing. ISBN 978-1-874557-07-4.
- IndyCar Media Guide & Record Book. Troy, Michigan: Championship Auto Racing Teams. 1996.
- Zanardi, Alex; Gasparini, Gianluca (2004). Alex Zanardi: My Story. Haynes Publishing Group. ISBN 978-1844251087.
- Whitaker, Sigur E. (2015). The Indy Car Wars: The 30-Year Fight for Control of American Open-Wheel Racing. McFarland & Company. ISBN 9780786498321.
