= 1996 Bartercard Indycar Australia =

Coordinates: 27°59′17.9″S 153°25′42.1″E

(Australia) 1996 Surfers Paradise
Race details
- Race 3 of 16 in the 1996 IndyCar season
- Map of the track
- Date: 31 March, 1996
- Official name: 1996 Bartercard Indycar Australia
- Location: Surfers Paradise Street Circuit; Queensland, Australia
- Course: Temporary Street Circuit; 2.795 mi / 4.498 km
- Distance: 65 laps 181.675 mi / 292.370 km

Pole position
- Driver: (United States) Jimmy Vasser (Target Chip Ganassi)
- Time: 1:35.940

Fastest lap
- Driver: (United States) Jimmy Vasser (Target Chip Ganassi)
- Time: 1:37.854 (on lap 25 of 65)

Podium
- First: (United States) Jimmy Vasser (Target Chip Ganassi)
- Second: (United States) Scott Pruett (Forsythe Racing)
- Third: (Canada) Greg Moore (Forsythe Racing)

The 1996 Bartercard Indycar Australia was the third round of the 1996 CART World Series season, held on 31 March 1996 on the Surfers Paradise Street Circuit, Surfers Paradise, Australia.

== Qualifying results ==
Pos	Nat	Name	Team	Car	Time
1	(United States)	Jimmy Vasser	Chip Ganassi Racing	Reynard 96I Honda	1:35.265
2	(United States)	Scott Pruett	Patrick Racing	Lola T96/00 Ford XD Cosworth	1:35.282
3	(Italy)	Alex Zanardi	Chip Ganassi Racing	Reynard 96I Honda	1:35.549
4	(Canada)	Paul Tracy	Team Penske	Penske PC25-96 Mercedes-Benz	1:35.987
5	(United States)	Michael Andretti	Newman-Haas Racing	Lola T96/00 Ford XD Cosworth	1:36.721
6	(Brazil)	Christian Fittipaldi	Newman-Haas Racing	Lola T96/00 Ford XD Cosworth	1:36.863
7	(United States)	Parker Johnstone	Comptech Racing	Reynard 96I Honda	1:37.023
8	(Canada)	Greg Moore	Forsythe Racing	Reynard 96I Ford XB Cosworth	1:37.026
9	(Brazil)	André Ribeiro	Tasman Motorsports	Lola T96/00 Honda	1:37.162
10	(Mexico)	Adrián Fernández	Tasman Motorsports	Lola T96/00 Honda	1:37.195
11	(Brazil)	Maurício Gugelmin	PacWest Racing	Reynard 96I Ford XB Cosworth	1:37.311
12	(Brazil)	Gil de Ferran	Hall Racing	Reynard 96I Honda	1:37.325
13	(United States)	Bobby Rahal	Team Rahal	Reynard 96I Mercedes-Benz	1:37.642
14	(United States)	Robby Gordon	Walker Racing	Reynard 96I Ford XD Cosworth	1:37.695
15	(Brazil)	Raul Boesel	Team Green	Reynard 96I Ford XD Cosworth	1:37.809
16	(United States)	Al Unser Jr.	Team Penske	Penske PC25-96 Mercedes-Benz	1:38.189
17	(United States)	Bryan Herta	Team Rahal	Reynard 96I Mercedes-Benz	1:38.420
18	(Brazil)	Emerson Fittipaldi	Hogan Racing	Penske PC25-96 Mercedes-Benz	1:38.588
19	(Brazil)	Roberto Moreno	Payton/Coyne Racing	Lola T96/00 Ford XB Cosworth	1:38.940
20	(Sweden)	Stefan Johansson	Bettenhausen Racing	Reynard 96I Mercedes-Benz	1:39.479
21	(Mexico)	Carlos Guerrero	Scandia/Simon Racing	Lola T96/00 Ford XB Cosworth	1:40.478
22	(United States)	Eddie Lawson	Galles Racing International	Lola T96/00 Mercedes-Benz	1:40.655
23	(Argentina)	Juan Manuel Fangio II	All American Racing	Eagle Mk. V Toyota	1:41.902
24	(United States)	Jeff Krosnoff	Arciero-Wells Racing	Reynard 96I Toyota	1:42.056
25	(Japan)	Hiro Matsushita	Payton/Coyne Racing	Lola T96/00 Ford XB Cosworth	1:42.921

== Race ==
Pos	No	Driver	Team	Laps	Time/retired	Grid	Points
1	12	(United States) Jimmy Vasser	Chip Ganassi Racing	65	2:00:46.856	1	22
2	20	(United States) Scott Pruett	Patrick Racing	65	+7.7 secs	2	16
3	99	(Canada) Greg Moore	Forsythe Racing	65	+12.3 secs	8	14
4	17	(Brazil) Maurício Gugelmin	PacWest Racing	65	+20.2 secs	11	12
5	11	(Brazil) Christian Fittipaldi	Newman-Haas Racing	65	+26.8 secs	6	10
6	16	(Sweden) Stefan Johansson	Bettenhausen Racing	65	+44.2 secs	20	8
7	10	(United States) Eddie Lawson	Galles Racing International	65	+1:06.3 secs	22	6
8	31	(Brazil) André Ribeiro	Tasman Motorsports	65	+1:45.0 secs	9	5
9	2	(United States) Al Unser Jr.	Team Penske	64	+ 1 lap	16	4
10	24	(Japan) Hiro Matsushita	Payton/Coyne Racing	64	+ 1 lap	25	3
11	8	(Brazil) Gil de Ferran	Hall Racing	63	Fuel	12	2
12	34	(Brazil) Roberto Moreno	Payton/Coyne Racing	61	+ 3 laps	19	1
13	1	(Brazil) Raul Boesel	Team Green	60	Fuel	15	
14	22	(Mexico) Carlos Guerrero	Scandia/Simon Racing	48	Contact	21	
15	36	(Argentina) Juan Manuel Fangio II	All American Racing	46	Fuel	23	
16	5	(United States) Robby Gordon	Walker Racing	45	Electrical	14	
17	28	(United States) Bryan Herta	Team Rahal	40	Pit fire	17	
18	25	(United States) Jeff Krosnoff	Arciero-Wells Racing	38	Contact	24	
19	6	(United States) Michael Andretti	Newman-Haas Racing	36	Electrical	5	
20	18	(United States) Bobby Rahal	Team Rahal	33	Transmission	13	
21	4	(Italy) Alex Zanardi	Chip Ganassi Racing	31	Transmission	3	
22	3	(Canada) Paul Tracy	Team Penske	16	Contact	4	
23	32	(Mexico) Adrián Fernández	Tasman Motorsports	14	Contact	10	
24	49	(United States) Parker Johnstone	Comptech Racing	10	Contact	7	
25	9	(Brazil) Emerson Fittipaldi	Hogan Racing	8	Engine	18	

=== Racing Statistics ===
- Average Speed 90.218 mph

Lap Leaders
Laps	Leader
1–36	Jimmy Vasser
37-41	Scott Pruett
42-65	Jimmy Vasser

Previous race: 1996 Indy Car Rio 400	PPG Indy Car World Series; 1996 season	Next race: 1996 Grand Prix of Long Beach
Previous race: 1995 Indycar Australia	1996 Bartercard Indycar Australia	Next race: 1997 Sunbelt IndyCarnival
