= Rio 200 =

CART Champ Car race

Emerson Fittipaldi Speedway at Jacarepaguá

The Rio 200 (initially Rio 400) was a CART Champ Car event held at Autódromo Internacional Nelson Piquet, in Rio de Janeiro. The race was contested on the trapezoid speedway at the facility known as Emerson Fittipaldi Speedway. The race was held from 1996 to 2000. The first three events were run over 400 kilometers; the final two were 200 miles.

This event was the only South American race sanctioned by CART. The IRL IndyCar Series began its 2010 season in Brazil with the São Paulo Indy 300, its first event outside of North America or Japan. However, this event took place on a temporary street circuit in São Paulo rather than at a permanent facility like Jacarepaguá in Rio de Janeiro.

The 2001 race was canceled when the Rio municipal government missed a deadline for guaranteeing payment of sanctioning fees and failed to grant race promoter Fittipaldi access to the facility so he could begin preparations for the race. CART, later renamed Champ Car, never returned to Rio.

== Race Winners ==
Season	Date	Race Name	Driver	Team	Chassis	Engine	Race Distance		Race Time	Average Speed (mph)	Report	Ref
Season	Date	Race Name	Driver	Team	Chassis	Engine	Laps	Miles (km)	Race Time	Average Speed (mph)	Report	Ref
1996	March 17	Indy Car Rio 400	(Brazil) André Ribeiro	Tasman Motorsports	Lola	Honda	133	247.912 (398.975)	2:06:08	117.917	Report	
1997	May 11	Hollywood Rio 400K	(Canada) Paul Tracy	Penske Racing	Penske	Ilmor-Mercedes	133	247.912 (398.975)	2:10:47	113.721	Report	
1998	May 10	Rio 400K	(Canada) Greg Moore	Forsythe Racing	Reynard	Ilmor-Mercedes	133	247.912 (398.975)	1:52:14	132.531	Report	
1999	May 15	GP Telemar Rio 200	(Colombia) Juan Pablo Montoya	Chip Ganassi Racing	Reynard	Honda	108	201.312 (323.98)	1:36:32	125.12	Report	
2000	April 30	Rio 200	(Mexico) Adrián Fernández	Patrick Racing	Reynard	Ford-Cosworth	108	201.312 (323.98)	1:37:12	124.256	Report	
