= Galles Racing =

American auto racing team

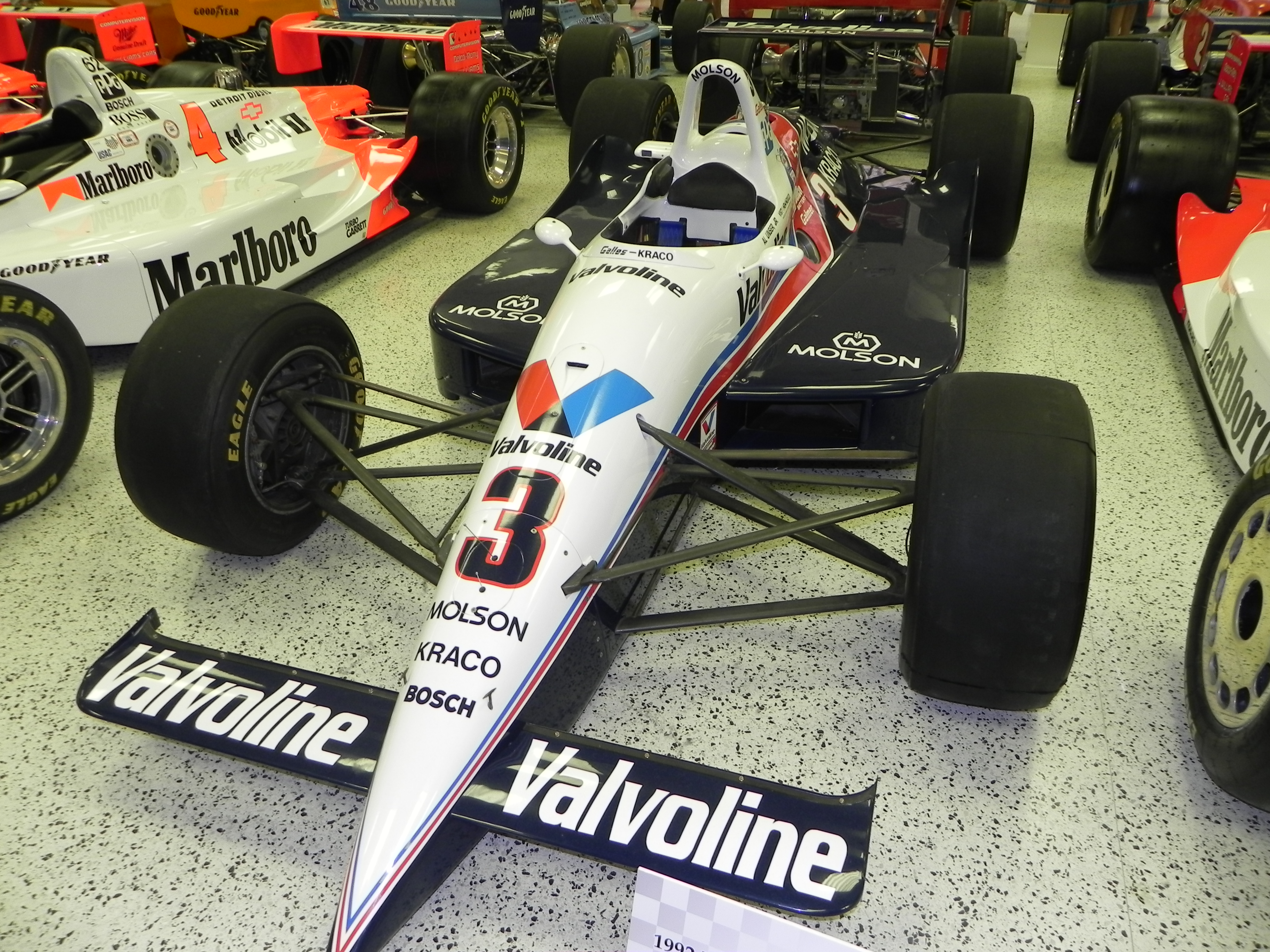
Al Unser Jr.'s 1992 Indy 500 winning Galmer.

Galles Racing is a former auto racing team owned by Rick Galles that competed in the CART series, Can-Am and the Indy Racing League. The team won the 1990 CART championship as well as the 1992 Indianapolis 500, both with driver Al Unser Jr. The team won a total of 21 Indy car races along its history. In addition to Unser's 1992 victory, the team finished second at Indianapolis in 1989, 1990 and 1996.

In 1992, the team notably fielded their own in-house Galmer chassis. The team achieved two victories with the car during its very brief foray into the sport.

== History ==
=== 1980s ===
The team first competed in a partial CART season in 1980, then was away from CART until 1983 when it fielded a car for rookie Al Unser Jr. Unser left the team after the 1984 season.

For 1985, Galles fielded the Buick V-6 engine at the Indy 500, with driver Pancho Carter winning the pole position. Carter, however, dropped out early and finished last.

In 1986-1987, Galles Racing became the primary support team for the new Brabham-Honda engine (later known as the Judd AV). Geoff Brabham and Jeff MacPherson fielded the engine at Indy in 1987, with MacPherson finishing a respectable 8th. Later in the season, Brabham scored second-place finishes at the Pocono 500 and at Road America.

In 1988, Al Unser Jr. returned to the team, and the entry was granted a lease for the Ilmor Chevrolet Indy-V-8 engine. In 1989, Unser Jr. then driving his familiar Valvoline-sponsored Chevy machine, nearly won the Indy 500, finishing second after crashing out with just over a lap to go in a famous duel with Emerson Fittipaldi.

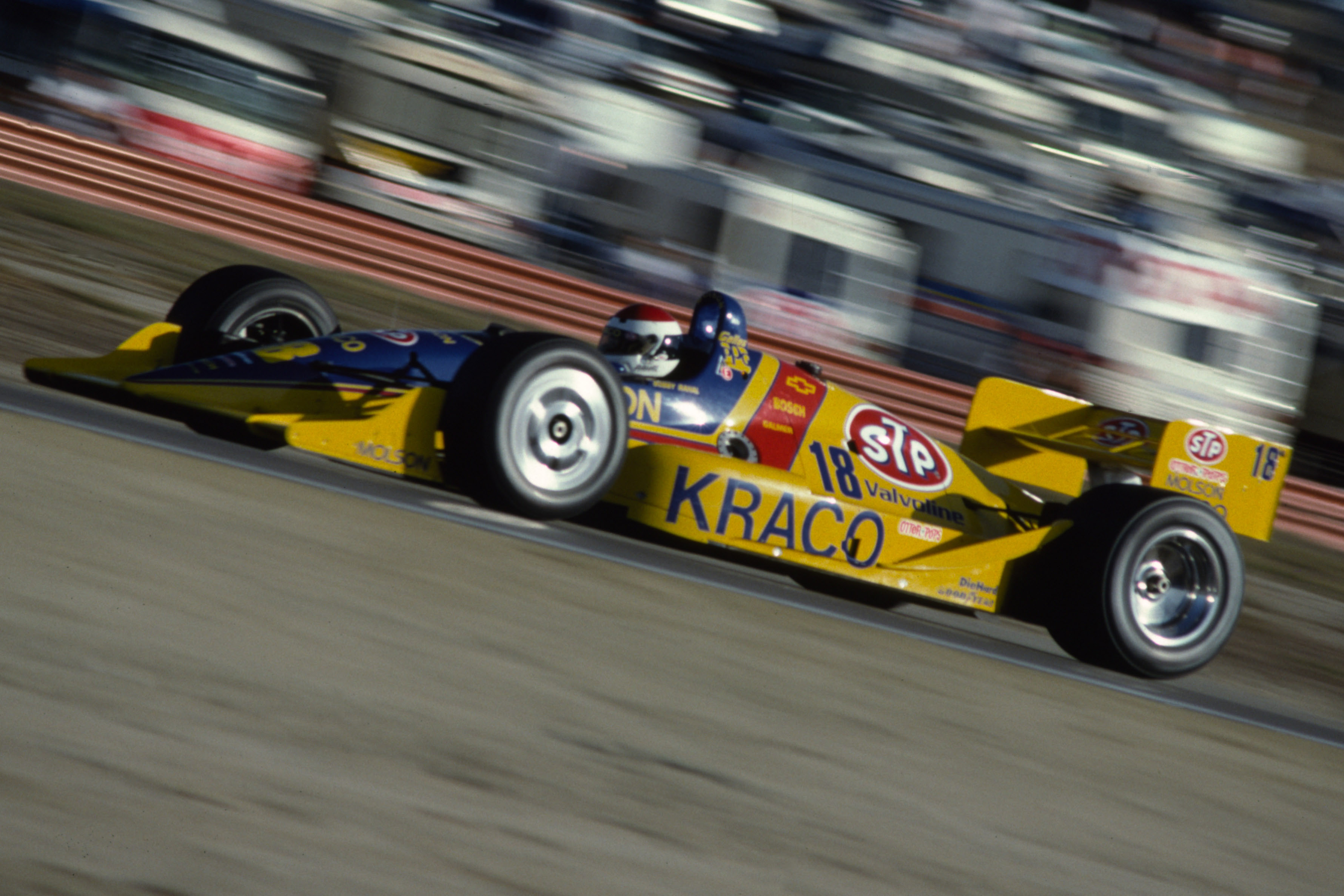
Bobby Rahal driving the Galles-Kraco car at Laguna Seca Raceway in 1991

=== Championship years ===
After the 1989 season, Galles merged teams with Maurice Kranes (who had fielded Kraco-sponsored cars for Michael Andretti and then Bobby Rahal). Kranes brought Rahal and Kraco with him, while Unser Jr. remained in the Valvoline-sponsored machine. The team competed as Galles-Kraco Racing from 1990 to 1992 and Unser won the 1990 CART Championship with five wins. The Galles-Kraco duo of Unser and Bobby Rahal was one of the top teams in CART during that period. Unser and Rahal teamed up for three 1-2 finishes, including the 1990 Michigan 500. The two drivers finished on the podium in the same race six times. Rahal himself earned an impressive, yet frustrating, eleven second-place finishes for the team in 1990-1991. Rahal finished fourth in the championship in 1990 and second in the championship in 1991, winning one race in 1991.

Al Unser Jr. finished third in points in both 1991 and 1992.

Rahal was replaced in 1992 by veteran Danny Sullivan as the team introduced their new proprietary Galmer chassis. Unser won the 1992 Indianapolis 500 in a Galmer in what would be the closest finish in race history. Despite winning, the Galmer chassis was scrapped after only one season. Sullivan won the race at Long Beach, after being involved in a controversial incident with less than four laps to go. Unser Jr. was leading the race, and Sullivan was running second. The two cars tangled, and Unser was sent spinning into a tire barrier, while Sullivan went on to win. The incident created friction inside the team.

Unser and Sullivan retained their seats in 1993, and were joined by Kevin Cogan and Mexican rookie Adrián Fernández, who would share a third car for selected races throughout the season. At the 1993 Indy 500, Sullivan was the first to retire from the race after a crash, but Unser finished in 8th place and Cogan finished 14th. After a lackluster season that saw only three podium finishes, Unser would leave for Penske Racing, and Sullivan moved into semi-retirement (he raced stock cars in 1994, and raced for PacWest in 1995). The final two wins of Sullivan's Indy car career came with the team, but it was later revealed that behind-the-scenes, there was a toxic atmosphere and internal friction inside the team that got worse when Sullivan tangled with Unser; it led to Sullivan being fired before the season concluded, right when Sullivan was not in a position to easily find himself a new job.

For 1994, Fernández was the team's lone entry, as the team reverted to its Galles Racing name. Fernández was joined by Brazilian journeyman Marco Greco for 1995, with a 3rd place for Fernández at the Michigan 500 being their best finish for the season.

=== Transition to IRL ===
1996 saw several drivers in Galles cars as the team was one of the few CART teams to cross over and compete in the rival Indy Racing League's first Indianapolis 500 with driver Davy Jones who finished second. Jones also drove a partial schedule in CART while rookie and former Motorcycle champion Eddie Lawson drove Galles' full-time CART entry. In 1997 the team moved full-time to the IRL with rookie Kenny Bräck. Bräck switched to A. J. Foyt Enterprises for 1998 and the team again ceased operations. Galles returned in 1999 with veteran Davey Hamilton. Hamilton was replaced in 2000 by a returning Al Unser Jr., who was switching over from CART after being released from Penske Racing. Unser was one of the first CART stars to switch full-time to the IRL. The team's final year was 2001 where Unser was joined by rookies Didier André and Casey Mears.

=== Summary ===
Throughout the team's 22-year history, their drivers captured 21 wins - 18 by Al Unser Jr. (6 in 1990, 4 in 1988, 2 in 1991 and 1 each in 1984, 1989, 1992, 1993, 2000, and 2001), two by Danny Sullivan (1 each in 1992 and 1993), and one by Bobby Rahal in 1991 in addition to capturing the 1990 CART championship and 1992 Indianapolis 500 with Unser.

== Former drivers ==
=== CART ===
- (Australia) Geoff Brabham (1985-1987)
- (United States) Pancho Carter (1984-1986)
- (United States) Kevin Cogan (1993)
- (United States) Dick Ferguson (1980)
- (Mexico) Adrián Fernández (1993-1995)
- (United States) Tom Gloy (1984)
- (Brazil) Marco Greco (1995)
- (United States) Davy Jones (1996)
- (United States) Eddie Lawson (1996)
- (United States) Jeff MacPherson (1987)
- (Brazil) Roberto Moreno (1985-1986)
- (United States) Bobby Rahal (1990-1991)
- (United States) Danny Sullivan (1992-1993)
- (United States) Al Unser Jr. (1983-1984, 1988-1993)

=== IRL ===
- (France) Didier André (2001)
- (Sweden) Kenny Bräck (1997)
- (Brazil) Marco Greco (1997)
- (United States) Davey Hamilton (1999)
- (United States) Davy Jones (1996)
- (United States) Casey Mears (2001)
- (United States) Al Unser Jr. (2000-2001)
- (United States) Jeff Ward (1997)

== Racing results ==
=== Complete CART results ===
(key)

Year	Chassis	Engine	Tyres	Drivers	No.	1	2	3	4	5	6	7	8	9	10	11	12	13	14	15	16	17	Pts Pos	Pos
Galles Racing
1983						ATL	INDY	MIL	CLE	MCH	ROA	POC	RIV	MDO	MCH	CPL	LAG	PHX						
1983	Eagle 83	Cosworth DFX V8t	G	(United States) Al Unser Jr.	17	6			9	7	2		4*	18	10	10	4	8					7th	89
1983	Eagle 83	Cosworth DFX V8t	G	(United States) Al Unser Jr.	19		10																7th	89
1983	March 83C	Cosworth DFX V8t	G	(United States) Al Unser Jr.	17			13				2											7th	89
1984						LBH	PHX	INDY	MIL	POR	MEA	CLE	MCH	ROA	POC	MDO	SAN	MCH	PHX	LAG	CPL			
1984	March 84C	Cosworth DFX V8t	G	(United States) Al Unser Jr.	7	Ret	Ret	Ret	3	1*	4	Ret	Ret	13	Ret	Ret	6	6	2	4	4		6th	103
1984	March 84C	Cosworth DFX V8t	G	(United States) Tom Gloy	77			17			Ret	Ret											40th	0
1984	March 84C	Cosworth DFX V8t	G	(United States) Pancho Carter	77								6		7						11		21st	22
1985						LBH	INDY	MIL	POR	MEA	CLE	MCH	ROA	POC	MDO	SAN	MCH	LAG	PHX	MIA				
1985	March 85C	Buick 3300 V6t	G	(United States) Pancho Carter	6	13	33																16th	37
1985	March 85C	Cosworth DFX V8t	G	(United States) Pancho Carter	6			5	13		16	16		12		2	10		7				16th	37
1985	March 85C	Cosworth DFX V8t	G	(Brazil) Roberto Moreno	6					28			16		25			16		5			28th	10
1985	March 85C	Cosworth DFX V8t	G	(Australia) Geoff Brabham	7	6	19	12	14	24	2	29	15	19	13	4	16	10	12	22			15th	41
1986						PHX	LBH	INDY	MIL	POR	MEA	CLE	TOR	MCH	POC	MDO	SAN	MCH	ROA	LAG	PHX	MIA		
1986	Lola T86/00	Cosworth DFX V8t	G	(Australia) Geoff Brabham	8	10	3	12	21								11	11		6	8	5	12th	64
1986	Lola T86/00	Brabham-Honda V8t	G	(Australia) Geoff Brabham	8					7	22	14	14	4	12	20			22				12th	64
1986	Lola T86/00	Cosworth DFX V8t	G	(Brazil) Roberto Moreno	9	20	6	19	13	18	18	25	18	6	10	16		6	16	20	10	17	16th	30
1986	Lola T86/00	Cosworth DFX V8t	G	(United States) Pancho Carter	9												15						19th	28
1986	Lola T86/00	Cosworth DFX V8t	G	(United States) Pancho Carter	15			16						3	3								19th	28
1987						LBH	PHX	INDY	MIL	POR	MEA	CLE	TOR	MCH	POC	ROA	MDO	NAZ	LAG	MIA				
1987	March 87C	Brabham-Honda V8t	G	(United States) Jeff MacPherson	11	10	13	8	8	13	21	17	22	23									19th	21
1987	March 87C	Cosworth DFX V8t	G	(United States) Jeff MacPherson	11										20			9	9	24			19th	21
1987	Lola T86/00	Brabham-Honda V8t	G	(United States) Jeff MacPherson	11											25	21						19th	21
1987	March 87C	Brabham-Honda V8t	G	(Australia) Geoff Brabham	15	16	8	24	12	9	4	22	DNS	8	2	2	7	12	5	3			8th	90
1988						PHX	LBH	INDY	MIL	POR	CLE	TOR	MEA	MCH	POC	MDO	ROA	NAZ	LAG	MIA				
1988	March 88C	Chevrolet 265A V8t	G	(United States) Al Unser Jr.	3	18	1*	13	20	4	4	1*	1	21	2	4	7	19	6	1*			2nd	149
1989						PHX	LBH	INDY	MIL	DET	POR	CLE	MEA	TOR	MCH	POC	MDO	ROA	NAZ	LAG				
1989	Lola T89/00	Chevrolet 265A V8t	G	(United States) Al Unser Jr.	2	2	1*	2	8	21	10	7	5	20	4	9	2	20	4	3			5th	136
Galles-Kraco Racing
1990						PHX	LBH	INDY	MIL	DET	POR	CLE	MEA	TOR	MCH	DEN	VAN	MDO	ROA	NAZ	LAG			
1990	Lola T90/00	Chevrolet 265A V8t	G	(United States) Al Unser Jr.	5	3	1*	4	1	27	3	15*	11	1*	1	1*	1*	3	4	16	2		1st	210
1990	Lola T90/00	Chevrolet 265A V8t	G	(United States) Bobby Rahal	18	2	12	2	4	2	11	2	25	22	2	3	8	6	7	3	5		4th	153
1991						SFR	LBH	PHX	INDY	MIL	DET	POR	CLE	MEA	TOR	MCH	DEN	VAN	MDO	ROA	NAZ	LAG		
1991	Lola T91/00	Chevrolet 265A V8t	G	(United States) Al Unser Jr.	1	16*	1*	6	4	19	4	4	4	2	23	3	1*	3	5	2	4	2	3rd	197
1991	Lola T91/00	Chevrolet 265A V8t	G	(United States) Bobby Rahal	18	2	2	2	19	4	2	3	3	1*	3	11	20	2	3	4	2	24	2nd	200
1992						SFR	PHX	LBH	INDY	DET	POR	MIL	NHA	TOR	MCH	CLE	ROA	VAN	MDO	NAZ	LAG			
1992	Galmer G92	Chevrolet 265A V8t	G	(United States) Al Unser Jr.	3	4	5	4*	1	9	3	7	8	7	4	3	2	2	3	11	9		3rd	169
1992	Galmer G92	Chevrolet 265A V8t	G	(United States) Danny Sullivan	18	5	12	1	5	5	12	12	9	3	8	20	7	7	8	17	7		7th	99
Galles Racing
1993						SFR	PHX	LBH	INDY	MIL	DET	POR	CLE	TOR	MCH	NHA	ROA	VAN	MDO	NAZ	LAG			
1993	Lola T93/07	Chevrolet 265C V8t	G	(United States) Al Unser Jr.	3	15	4	21	8	5	6	5	19	5	8	8	25	1	8	25	5		7th	100
1993	Lola T93/07	Chevrolet 265C V8t	G	(United States) Danny Sullivan	7	13	23	8	33	16	1*	14	14	3	Wth	22	26	10	27	20	27		12th	43
1993	Lola T93/07	Chevrolet 265C V8t	G	(Mexico) Adrian Fernández	7										DNS								24th	7
1993	Lola T93/07	Chevrolet 265C V8t	G	(Mexico) Adrian Fernández	11			23		21	7					29							24th	7
1993	Lola T93/07	Chevrolet 265C V8t	G	(United States) Kevin Cogan	11				14			27	13	15									35th	0
1994						SFR	PHX	LBH	INDY	MIL	DET	POR	CLE	TOR	MCH	MDO	NHA	VAN	ROA	NAZ	LAG			
1994	Reynard 94i	Ilmor 265D V8t	G	(Mexico) Adrian Fernández	7	13	10	8	28	16	23	10	7	13	23	6	8	22	5	21	7		13th	46
1995						MIA	SFR	PHX	LBH	NAZ	INDY	MIL	DET	POR	ROA	TOR	CLE	MCH	MDO	NHA	VAN	LAG		
1995	Lola T95/00	Mercedes-Benz IC108B V8t	G	(Mexico) Adrian Fernández	10	11	26	12	18	9	21	10	6	9	6	7	12	3	4	26	22	10	12th	66
1995	Lola T95/00	Mercedes-Benz IC108B V8t	G	(Brazil) Marco Greco	55				13	21	DNQ		13	11	23	20	15		22	20	25	23	29th	2
1996						MIA	RIO	SFR	LBH	NAZ	500	MIL	DET	POR	CLE	TOR	MCH	MDO	ROA	VAN	LAG			
1996	Lola T96/00	Mercedes-Benz IC108C V8t	G	(United States) Eddie Lawson	10	15	21	7	9	17	6	20	6	15	24	15							20th	26
1996	Lola T96/00	Mercedes-Benz IC108C V8t	G	(United States) Davy Jones	10												12	16	24	14	14		31st	1

=== Indy Racing League results ===
(key)

Year	Chassis	Engine	Tyres	Drivers	No.	1	2	3	4	5	6	7	8	9	10	11	12	13	Pts Pos	Pos
1996						WDW	PHX	INDY												
1996	Lola T95/00	Mercedes-Benz IC108C V8t	G	(United States) Davy Jones	70			2											26th	33
1996–97						NHA	LSV	WDW	PHX	INDY	TXS	PPIR	CLT	NHA	LSV					
1996–97	G-Force GF01	Oldsmobile Aurora V8	G	(United States) Davy Jones	4			Wth											—	0
1996–97	G-Force GF01	Oldsmobile Aurora V8	G	(United States) Jeff Ward	4			16											30th	69
1996–97	G-Force GF01	Oldsmobile Aurora V8	G	(Sweden) Kenny Bräck	4				11	33	18	14	5	5	20				19th	139
1996–97	G-Force GF01	Oldsmobile Aurora V8	G	(Brazil) Marco Greco	70							13	9	20	10				3rd	230
1999						WDW	PHX	CLT	INDY	TXS	PPIR	ATL	DOV	PPIR	LSV	TXS				
1999	G-Force GF01C	Oldsmobile Aurora V8	G	(United States) Davey Hamilton	9	8													4th	237
1999	Dallara IR9	Oldsmobile Aurora V8	G	(United States) Davey Hamilton	9				11	7	3	7	23	2	13	2			4th	237
2000						WDW	PHX	LSV	INDY	TXS	PPIR	ATL	KTY	TXS						
2000	G-Force GF05	Oldsmobile Aurora V8	F	(United States) Al Unser Jr.	3	25	9	1	29	3*	10	3	27	17*					9th	188
2001						PHX	HMS	ATL	INDY	TXS	PPIR	RIR	KAN	NSH	KTY	GAT	CHI	TXS		
2001	G-Force GF05	Oldsmobile Aurora V8	F	(United States) Al Unser Jr.	3	23	6	17	30	8	11	3	20	14	4	1	8	6	7th	287
2001	G-Force GF05	Oldsmobile Aurora V8	F	(United States) Casey Mears	31	20	11	23	DNQ										31st	36
2001	G-Force GF05	Oldsmobile Aurora V8	F	(France) Didier André	32	27	10	13	DNQ	17	19	4	16	21	11	12	13	15	20th	188

== IndyCar wins ==
#	Season	Date	Sanction	Track / Race	No.	Winning driver	Chassis	Engine	Tire	Grid	Laps Led
1	1984	June 17	CART	Grand Prix of Portland (R)	7	(United States) Al Unser Jr.	March 84C	Cosworth DFX V8t	Goodyear	10	68
2	1988	April 17	CART	Grand Prix of Long Beach (S)	3	(United States) Al Unser Jr. (2)	March 88C	Chevrolet 265A V8t	Goodyear	4	73
3	1988	July 17	CART	Streets of Toronto (S)	3	(United States) Al Unser Jr. (3)	March 88C	Chevrolet 265A V8t	Goodyear	3	85
4	1988	July 24	CART	Meadowlands Street Circuit (S)	3	(United States) Al Unser Jr. (4)	March 88C	Chevrolet 265A V8t	Goodyear	6	32
5	1988	November 6	CART	Tamiami Park, Miami (S)	3	(United States) Al Unser Jr. (5)	March 88C	Chevrolet 265A V8t	Goodyear	5	82
6	1989	April 16	CART	Grand Prix of Long Beach (S)	2	(United States) Al Unser Jr. (6)	Lola T89/00	Chevrolet 265A V8t	Goodyear	Pole	84
NC	1989	October 14	CART	Laguna Seca Raceway (R)	2	(United States) Al Unser Jr.	Lola T89/00	Chevrolet 265A V8t	Goodyear	6	33
7	1990	April 22	CART	Grand Prix of Long Beach (S)	5	(United States) Al Unser Jr. (7)	Lola T90/00	Chevrolet 265A V8t	Goodyear	Pole	91
8	1990	June 3	CART	Milwaukee Mile (O)	5	(United States) Al Unser Jr. (8)	Lola T90/00	Chevrolet 265A V8t	Goodyear	9	82
9	1990	July 22	CART	Streets of Toronto (S)	5	(United States) Al Unser Jr. (9)	Lola T90/00	Chevrolet 265A V8t	Goodyear	8	62
10	1990	August 5	CART	Michigan 500 (O)	5	(United States) Al Unser Jr. (10)	Lola T90/00	Chevrolet 265A V8t	Goodyear	5	40
11	1990	August 26	CART	Streets of Denver (S)	5	(United States) Al Unser Jr. (11)	Lola T90/00	Chevrolet 265A V8t	Goodyear	2	33
12	1990	September 2	CART	Streets of Vancouver (S)	5	(United States) Al Unser Jr. (12)	Lola T90/00	Chevrolet 265A V8t	Goodyear	6	58
13	1991	April 14	CART	Grand Prix of Long Beach (S)	1	(United States) Al Unser Jr. (13)	Lola T91/00	Chevrolet 265A V8t	Goodyear	2	93
14	1991	July 14	CART	Meadowlands Street Circuit (S)	18	(United States) Bobby Rahal	Lola T91/00	Chevrolet 265A V8t	Goodyear	4	89
15	1991	August 25	CART	Streets of Denver (S)	1	(United States) Al Unser Jr. (14)	Lola T91/00	Chevrolet 265A V8t	Goodyear	3	64
16	1992	April 12	CART	Grand Prix of Long Beach (S)	18	(United States) Danny Sullivan	Galmer G92	Chevrolet 265A V8t	Goodyear	2	7
17	1992	May 24	USAC	Indianapolis 500 (O)	3	(United States) Al Unser Jr. (15)	Galmer G92	Chevrolet 265A V8t	Goodyear	12	25
18	1993	June 13	CART	Detroit Belle Isle Grand Prix (S)	7	(United States) Danny Sullivan (2)	Lola T93/07	Chevrolet 265C V8t	Goodyear	10	30
19	1993	August 29	CART	Streets of Vancouver (S)	3	(United States) Al Unser Jr. (16)	Lola T93/07	Chevrolet 265C V8t	Goodyear	5	38
20	2000	April 22	IRL	Las Vegas Motor Speedway (O)	3	(United States) Al Unser Jr. (17)	G-Force GF05	Oldsmobile Aurora V8	Firestone	21	21
21	2001	August 26	IRL	Gateway Motorsports Park (O)	3	(United States) Al Unser Jr. (18)	G-Force GF05	Oldsmobile Aurora V8	Firestone	8	75
