= Galmer =

Galmer G92 Galmer 92B
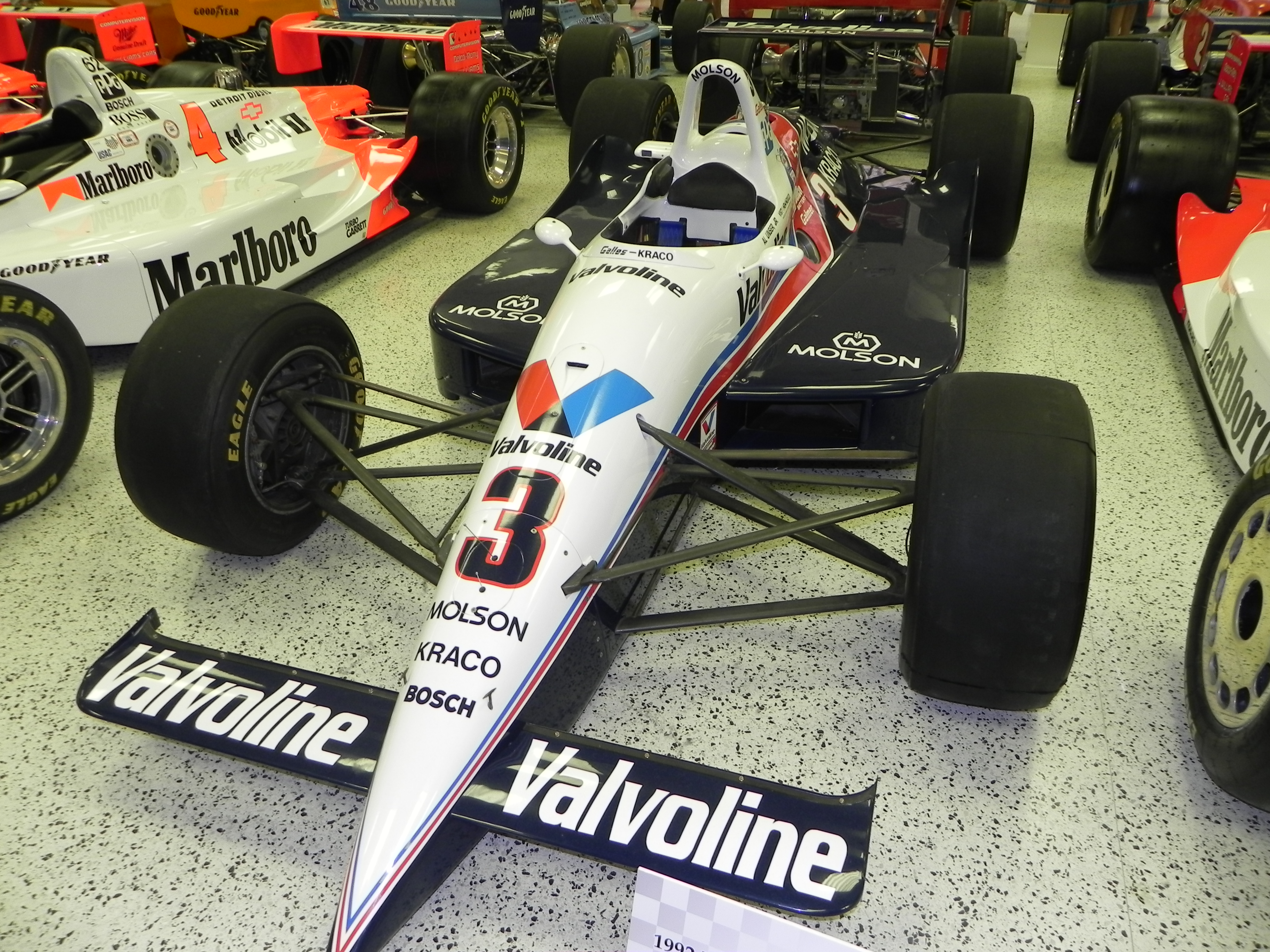
- Galmer G92
- Category: CART IndyCar
- Constructor: Galmer Engineering; Galmer Engineering at Bicester
- Designers: Alan Mertens; Seamus Campbell; Andy Brown

Technical specifications
- Chassis: Carbon Fiber Aluminum Honeycomb monocoque
- Suspension (front): Pushrod upper-rocker, inboard springs and damper
- Engine: Ilmor-Chevrolet 265A, 2,647 cc (161.5 cu in), V8 80°, turbocharged, Mid-engined, longitudinally mounted.
- Torque: 681 newton-metres (502 lbf⋅ft)
- Transmission: 6-speed manual
- Power: 850 brake horsepower (630 kW)
- Weight: 750 kilograms (1,650 lb)
- Fuel: Methanol
- Tyres: Goodyear 16 in. x 10.75 in. (front) 16 in. x 15 in. (rear)

Competition history
- Notable entrants: Galles Racing; Burns Racing; PacWest Racing
- Notable drivers: Al Unser Jr., Danny Sullivan, Dominic Dobson
- Debut: 1992 Daikyo IndyCar Grand Prix, Surfers Paradise, Australia
Races	Wins	Poles
20	2	1
- Constructors' Championships: 0
- Drivers' Championships: 0

Galmer was an American racecar manufacturer that built cars used from 1992 through 1993 in CART competition and the Indianapolis 500. The cars were commissioned by the Galles Racing team. Although they were an American-based effort, spearheaded by Alan Mertens (galmerinc.com), the cars were actually assembled at the Galmer Engineering shop in Bicester, England.

== History ==
Galmer Engineering was established in November 1988 by former March engineer Alan Mertens and CART team owner Rick Galles.

The Galmer chassis program came at a time in the CART series when interest in in-house chassis development was at its peak. The program followed in the footsteps of Penske, Truesports, and others (Porsche, etc.) who also had, or had previously attempted, similar in-house chassis programs. The name "Galmer" is a portmanteau of the surnames of Rick Galles and Alan Mertens.

The chassis' most notable accomplishment was Al Unser Jr.'s win at the 1992 Indianapolis 500 in the closest finish in race history at the time. One other CART race was won with the chassis by Danny Sullivan in 1992. In the 1992 CART season, Unser Jr. scored 15 top-ten finishes in 16 races (the other finish was an 11th), en route to third place in the final championship standings. Sullivan had 11 top-tens, finishing 7th in points.

The 1992 season was the only year the chassis was utilized in a full-time capacity. Though it was not openly revealed at the time, the decision for Galles Racing to ultimately shelve the Galmer project was made on the morning of the 1992 Indianapolis 500, the same race that Unser Jr. went on to win.

In 1993, the car was used on a part-time basis by Dominic Dobson. Proving uncompetitive, the car was retired never to be raced in CART competition again. Only those three men ever raced a Galmer in CART competition, yet it won two races, making it one of the most successful chassis on a per-race basis.

At the end of the 1993 season, Rick Galles sold the company's stake to Bruce McCaw of PacWest Racing, and for the next five years Galmer had been researching and developing McCaw's team.

Galmer attempted to enter Formula One in 1993 with a takeover of the defunct Brabham team, however the effort failed as a result of financial problems.

== Transponder Placement ==
The Galmer chassis had one unique characteristic compared to its chassis counterparts in the CART series in 1992. It was standard for all cars to mount their scoring transponder in the left side pod of the car. The Galmer chassis, however, did not have room in that location. The cars of Unser Jr. and Sullivan instead had the transponders placed in the nosecone of the car.

Due to the proximity of the transponder, Unser Jr.'s official race-winning margin of 0.043 seconds over Scott Goodyear in the 1992 Indianapolis 500 was deemed inconclusive. After further consideration, USAC officials calculated the true margin of victory to be narrower, at 0.0331 seconds. The official margin, however, would remain in the record book as the closest finish in race's history until 2026.

After the 1992 season was over, Valvoline purchased the race-winning Galmer chassis driven by Unser Jr. On frequent occasions, it is used for display at various engagements.

== Complete Indy Car World Series results ==
(key)

Year	Entrants	Chassis	Engines	Tyres	Drivers	No.	1	2	3	4	5	6	7	8	9	10	11	12	13	14	15	16	Points	D.C.
1992	Galles-Kraco Racing	G92	Chevrolet 265A V8t	G			SFR	PHX	LBH	INDY	DET	POR	MIL	NHA	TOR	MCH	CLE	ROA	VAN	MDO	NAZ	LAG		
1992	Galles-Kraco Racing	G92	Chevrolet 265A V8t	G	(United States) Al Unser Jr.	3	4	5	4*	1	9	3	7	8	7	4	3	2	2	3	11	9	169	3rd
1992	Galles-Kraco Racing	G92	Chevrolet 265A V8t	G	(United States) Danny Sullivan	18	5	12	1	5	5	12	12	9	3	8	20	7	7	8	17	7	99	7th
1993	Burns Racing	92B	Chevrolet 265A V8t	G			SFR	PHX	LBH	INDY	MIL	DET	POR	CLE	TOR	MCH	NHA	ROA	VAN	MDO	NAZ	LAG		
1993	Burns Racing	92B	Chevrolet 265A V8t	G	(United States) Dominic Dobson	66				23													0	39th
1993	PacWest Racing	92B	Chevrolet 265A V8t	G	(United States) Dominic Dobson	17													14	DNQ		18	0	39th
