= 1996 U.S. 500 =

CART race at Michigan on May 26, 1996

(United States) 1996 U.S. 500
Race details
- Race 6 of 16 in the 1996 CART season
- 1996 U.S. 500 program cover
- Date: May 26, 1996
- Official name: The Inaugural U.S. 500
- Location: Michigan International Speedway, Brooklyn, Michigan, United States
- Course: Permanent racing facility 2.000 mi / 3.219 km
- Distance: 250 laps 500.000 mi / 804.672 km
- Weather: Temperatures reaching up to 63 °F (17 °C); wind speeds up to 9.9 miles per hour (15.9 km/h)

Pole position
- Driver: (United States) Jimmy Vasser (Chip Ganassi Racing)
- Time: 31.031 (232.025 mph)

Fastest lap
- Driver: (Italy) Alex Zanardi (Chip Ganassi Racing)
- Time: 30.836 (233.493 mph) (on lap 18 of 250)

Podium
- First: (United States) Jimmy Vasser (Chip Ganassi Racing)
- Second: (Brazil) Maurício Gugelmin (PacWest Racing)
- Third: (Brazil) Roberto Moreno (Payton/Coyne Racing)

Michigan International Speedway track map.

The 1996 U.S. 500 was a CART series race held at Michigan International Speedway in Brooklyn, Michigan on Sunday May 26, 1996. It was the sixth round of the 1996 CART PPG Indy Car World Series season, and was run on the same day as the 1996 Indianapolis 500. Jimmy Vasser of Chip Ganassi Racing won the race from the pole position. It marked the first and only time that two 500-mile Indy car races were held at Michigan in the same season, alongside the traditional Michigan 500, which was held two months later on July 28.

The race was born out of a protest of the formation of the rival IRL and specifically the reservation of starting spots in the 1996 Indianapolis 500 to IRL-based entries. In 1994, Indianapolis Motor Speedway president Tony George announced he was going to start a new series, the Indy Racing League (IRL), with the Indianapolis 500 as its centerpiece. CART had been sanctioning the sport of Indy car racing since 1979, with the exception of the Indianapolis 500 itself, which was sanctioned singly by USAC. Throughout much of 1995, the CART-based teams were unhappy with the formation of the IRL, and mostly uninterested in participating in its events. However, for the time being, they were still tentatively preparing to compete at the Indianapolis 500 (in a one-off) pending a reconciliation. Traditionally, the Indianapolis 500 has had a field of 33 cars. On July 3, 1995, the IRL announced that the top 25 drivers in IRL points would be guaranteed starting positions in the 1996 Indy 500, leaving only eight at-large spots; a rule that became known as the 25/8 rule. On December 18, 1995 CART teams, convinced they were being deliberately locked out from the 1996 Indy 500, and the victims of a "power grab" by Tony George, announced their intentions to boycott that event. The owners, along with CART president and CEO Andrew Craig, jointly announced plans for a new race, the Inaugural U.S. 500, to be held at Michigan International Speedway the same day.

A field of 28 cars qualified for the race. All of the CART-based teams participated, including such major teams as Penske, Ganassi, Newman/Haas, Galles, Rahal, Tasman, Forsythe, and Team Green – each considered among the top teams in the sport. The race attracted a crowd of 110,879 spectators, and posted a $1 million purse for first place. The historic Vanderbilt Cup trophy was revived and would be presented to the winner. But the race was marred by a huge pileup on the pace lap, which turned the race into a debacle. Approaching the green flag in turn four, Adrián Fernández, in the middle of the front row, clipped wheels with polesitter Jimmy Vasser. Both cars crashed collecting Bryan Herta on the outside of the front row. Several other cars were collected in the incident. Many cars crashed, spun, or veered to the infield grass to avoid the melee. The race was red-flagged, with no less than 12 cars involved in the crash. About an hour later, the race was restarted with numerous drivers switching to back-up cars.

CART rookie Alex Zanardi started in row two and avoided the pace lap crash. He led 134 laps (of 250) but dropped out with a blown engine on lap 175. The lead passed to Parker Johnstone, and then to André Ribeiro. With nine laps to go, Ribeiro's car ran out of fuel, and he was forced to duck into the pits for a splash-and-go. Ribeiro's car – one of the backup cars rolled out – did not have proper working fuel telemetry, leaving the crew unsure of their fuel situation. Jimmy Vasser led the final 9 laps to victory. It was Vasser's fourth win of the season, and he would go on to win the 1996 CART championship.

== Background ==
See also 1996 Indy Racing League season

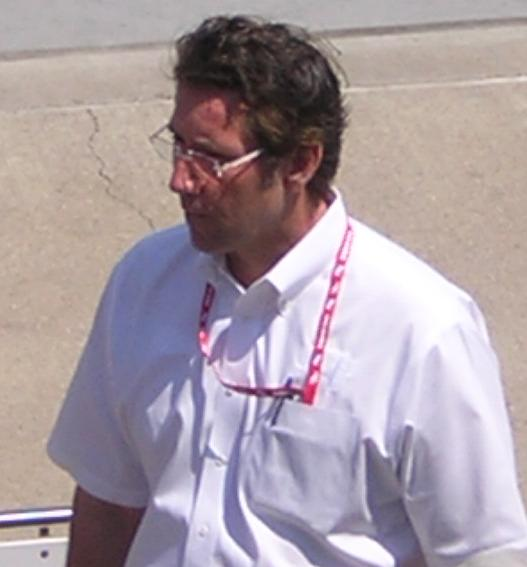
Tony George

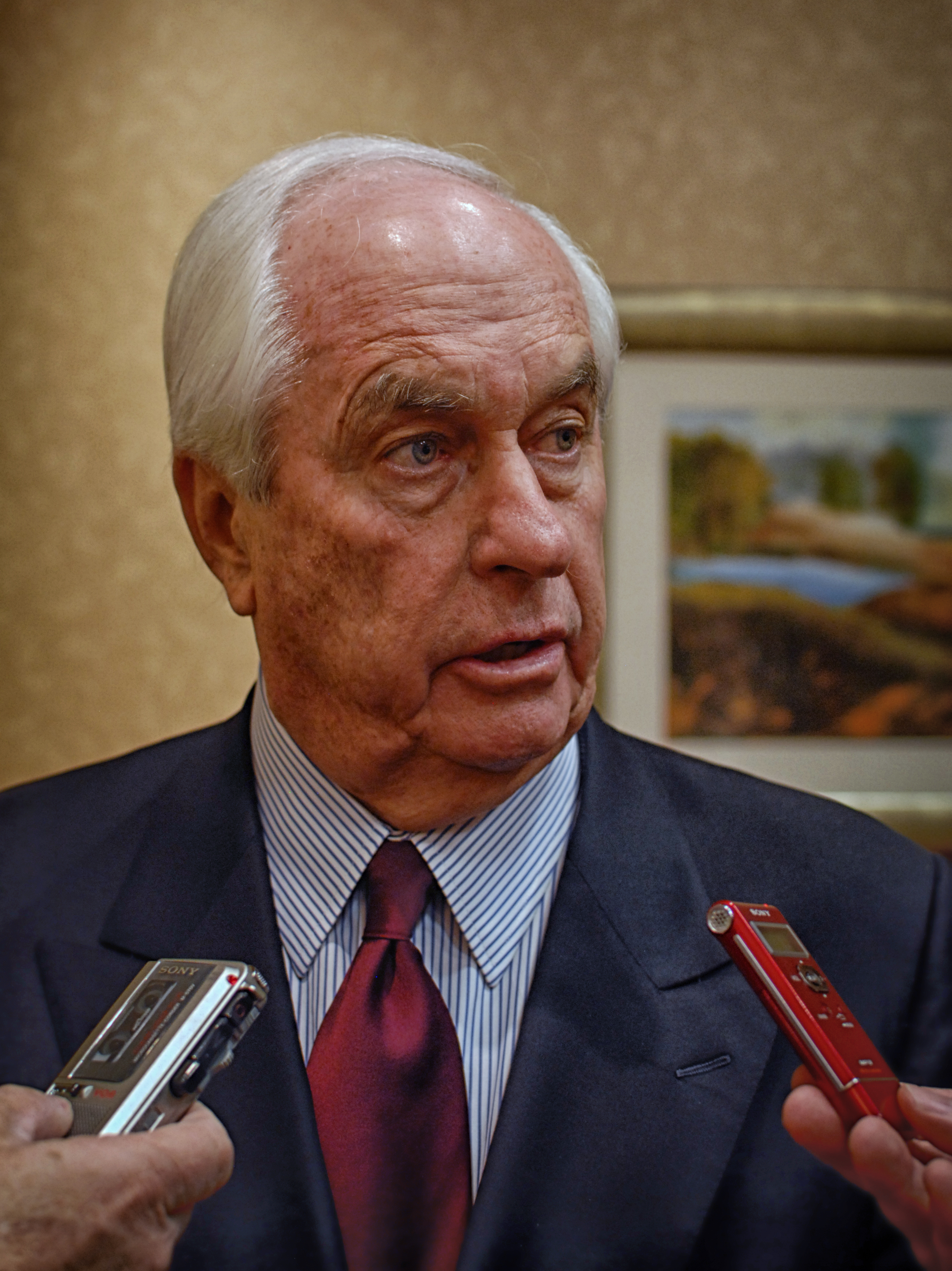
Roger Penske

The seeds of the IRL/CART "Split" were planted in the early 1990s, when newly-named Indianapolis Motor Speedway president Tony George began exploring options of changes in the sport of Indy car racing. Sharply rising costs, the lack of many ovals on the schedule, and the dwindling number of American participants were among his stated concerns. As early as May 1991, George announced intentions to change the engine formula to 3.5L normally aspirated powerplants (similar to the engines used in Formula One at the time), an idea that never got beyond the planning stages. George joined the CART board of directors from 1992 to 1994 as a non-voting member. He resigned after the brief tenure, disagreeing with the direction of the series.

In the summer of 1994, George announced he was going to start a new series, the Indy Racing League, with the Indianapolis 500 as its centerpiece. CART had been sanctioning the sport of Indy car racing since 1979, with the exception of the Indianapolis 500 itself, which was sanctioned singly by USAC. The first USAC/CART "split" in 1979 had already caused major controversy in the sport. USAC continued to sanction paved championship races outside of Indianapolis as late as 1981, but by 1983 dropped all races outside of Indy. An arrangement around that time was put in place to recognize the Indianapolis 500 on the CART schedule, and it would pay points towards the CART championship. The Indy 500 would be contested by the CART-based teams, along with numerous part-time and "Indy only" entries. Stability returned, and the sport settled into a relative harmony through 1995. Rules between the two sanctioning bodies were largely similar, and for the most part, the same chassis and engines were used by both, with only minor technical differences. One conspicuous difference was that USAC allowed "stock block" engines (e.g. Buick V-6 and the Menard V-6) more turbocharger boost than CART allowed, and USAC - for a time - allowed purpose-built pushrod engines (a rule that was exploited by Penske in 1994).

George blueprinted the new Indy Racing League as a lower-cost alternative to CART, with an emphasis on attracting more American drivers (particularly from the Sprint and Midget ranks), an all-oval schedule, and new cars with normally-aspirated, "production-based" engines. Turbochargers would be banned after 1996. For approximately the first season and a half the Indy Racing League would fall under the overall sanctioning umbrella of USAC. As a result of these changes, the Indy 500 would no longer be recognized on the CART calendar, and due to a planned "rules freeze", CART's 1996 model year chassis and some of the 1996 engines would technically be prohibited as well. Furthermore, starting in 1997, the machines raced in IRL would be entirely different and the chassis and turbocharged engines used in CART would no longer be allowed at the Speedway.

Almost immediately, a turbulent political controversy erupted, with participants, media, fans, manufacturers, and sponsors all apprehensive of the sport's direction and pending shakeup. The prevailing opinion around the CART paddock was largely negative regarding the formation of the IRL. The 1995 season and 1995 Indy 500 were held as normal, but under a growing cloud of uncertainty about the future of the sport. During the summer of 1995, and into the offseason, the two factions of CART and the IRL were unable to reconcile on much of anything, and the "Split" began to take shape.

From 1992 to 1996, Championship Auto Racing Teams (CART) licensed the trademark IndyCar from the Indianapolis Motor Speedway. During that timeframe, the CART series was referred to as the PPG IndyCar Series, the sanctioning body operated under the name "IndyCar", and the machines were referred to as "Indy cars". All references to "CART" were largely eschewed. With the upstart series now named the Indy Racing League, and ties between the Indy 500 and CART severed, there was growing confusion with respect to the names.

=== CART boycott ===
Throughout much of the summer and fall of 1995, CART teams were generally ambivalent regarding the formation of the IRL and expressed no interest in participating in any IRL race other than Indianapolis. CART announced their 1996 schedule on June 10, 1995, which initially featured no races in May and an open date on Memorial Day weekend. While no direct conflicts with the three-race 1996 IRL schedule were created, CART scheduled international races at Rio and Australia the weekend before and the weekend after the IRL race at Phoenix, respectively. With lengthy and logistically complicated international trips bookending Phoenix, there would be no realistic way for the CART teams to participate in that event.

On July 3, 1995, to ensure larger car counts for non-Indianapolis races, the IRL announced that the top 25 drivers in the IRL points standings would be guaranteed starting positions in the 1996 Indy 500. The only condition was to meet a prescribed minimum qualifying speed average during time trials (220 mph). The new rules meant that only eight positions would be filled by non-top 25 "at-large" entries, leading to it being referred to as the 25/8 rule.

George and others within the IRL hoped that the 25/8 rule would lure some of the CART teams to participate in the first two IRL races in 1996 (Walt Disney World and Phoenix). However, none of the CART teams were planning on entering either of those two races. Since none of the CART-based entries would have scored any IRL championship points by the time they arrived at Indy in May, the entire contingent of CART-based teams (as many as 28 cars), would all be considered "at-large" entries - all vying for only 8 spots on the grid. With additional handful of (non-CART based) one-off "Indy-only" entries expected to enter, the total number of "at-large" cars could be as high as 35–40.

On December 18, 1995 CART teams, convinced they were being deliberately locked out from the 1996 Indy 500, announced their intention to boycott the 500. The owners, along with CART president and CEO Andrew Craig, jointly announced plans for a new race, the Inaugural U.S. 500, to be held at Michigan International Speedway the same day. At the time, Michigan was owned by Roger Penske, a prominent owner in the CART series. The official reaction from IMS/IRL was one of disappointment and dismay, suggesting that CART was preparing to do considerable damage to Indy car racing. CART participants were convinced of the opposite.

=== "Stars and cars" ===
Almost immediately after the announcement of the race, the U.S. 500 was marketed as the "[Real] stars and cars" of Indy car racing. It was to imply the top teams, top drivers, and the best equipment would be racing at Michigan and not at Indy. The tagline appeared on the race's program cover, and similar phrases appeared in various advertisements. Several of the drivers at Indy were inexperienced rookies from an obscure range of backgrounds, giving the impression of a field of replacement drivers. Three former Indy 500 winners (Bobby Rahal, Emerson Fittipaldi, and Al Unser Jr.) would be at Michigan, while only former 500 winner (Arie Luyendyk) would be at Indy.

The U.S. 500 name was a reference to the United States of America, and was immediately referred to by CART CEO Andrew Craig as "...America's best taking on the world." The name style was not entirely unique; it was similar to the NHRA's U.S. Nationals, and the Formula One U.S. Grand Prix. Without Indy on their calendar, CART was determined to establish the U.S. 500 as the flagship event for their series.

All of the CART-based teams elected to boycott the 1996 Indianapolis 500 (and the remainder of the 1996 IRL season) except for Galles and Walker. But neither of those two teams fielded their regular full-time CART drivers at Indy. Former CART teams A. J. Foyt Racing, Hemelgarn Racing, and Dick Simon Racing (which had been sold to Andy Evans and became Team Scandia) switched alliances during the offseason to the IRL.

As the month of May drew closer, the chances of any sort of reconciliation evaporated. Some sponsors, such as Valvoline, pulled their support of the Indy 500, and switched their alliances to the U.S. 500. Numerous CART drivers, including Emerson Fittipaldi, Michael Andretti, Al Unser Jr., Bobby Rahal, Robby Gordon, among others, went on record stating they wished they were racing at Indianapolis, but would not do so.

== Timeline ==
- January 18, 1996: CART announced a $3.5 million purse for the U.S. 500, with $1 million going to the winner. Second place would receive $250,000 and $100,000 for third.
- January 27, 1996: The rival IRL holds its inaugural race, the Indy 200 at Walt Disney World Speedway. As expected, none of the CART-based teams showed up.
- February 23, 1996: Tony George met with Roger Penske in an effort to discuss a solution which would lure the CART teams back to Indy. A proposal to expand the Indy 500 field to 42 cars, and a request to allow 1996 model year chassis were among the ideas discussed. Though some media outlets prematurely reported a truce, and that the U.S. 500 was cancelled, the meeting adjourned with no real progress and no formal agreement.
- March 3, 1996: The CART season began with the Marlboro Grand Prix of Miami at Homestead–Miami Speedway. Jimmy Vasser was the winner, his first CART series victory.
- March 24, 1996: The second race of the IRL season was held at Phoenix. Once again, no CART-based teams entered. It was the final IRL race before going to Indy.
- May 2, 1996: An entry list of 29 cars was announced for the U.S. 500. Mario Andretti, rumored to be coming out of retirement to race in the U.S. 500, was not the list.
- May 6, 1996: The Indianapolis Motor Speedway and the Indy Racing League filed a lawsuit in the United States District Court for the Southern District of Indiana to prevent CART from using the IndyCar trademark. CART had been licensing the moniker since 1992. IMS also filed for damages, accusing CART and its members of conspiracy and antitrust. Judge David F. Hamilton presided over the suit. Later in the year, the lawsuit would be settled. For 1997, CART relinquished its license of the term IndyCar, and rebranded itself as "CART" once again. In order to further distance themselves from the Indy 500 and the rival Indy Racing League (which it no longer had any link), participants started referring to their machines not as "Indy cars" but as "Champ Cars", a revival of a historic name.

== Practice and qualifying ==
Practice and qualifying was scheduled for May 9–12 and May 24–25, with race day scheduled for May 26. The track was scheduled to open on Thursday May 9 with rookie orientation, followed by full field practice on Friday May 10. Pole qualifying was scheduled for Saturday May 11, followed by Second Round qualifying on May 12. The teams would then depart and return two weeks later. If necessary, a third and final round of qualifying would be held on Friday May 24. Final practice was scheduled for Saturday May 25, the day before the race.

Scheduling qualifying for a separate weekend mimicked the schedule for the Indy 500, and was largely unique compared to other the CART series races. Nearly all other CART races conducted qualifying on the same weekend as the race. Pole qualifying for the U.S. 500 would be held on the same day and around the same time as pole qualifying for the Indy 500. This effectively prevented teams competing at both events from having hopes of winning the pole position at both races.

=== Thursday May 9 ===
Rookie orientation was held on Thursday May 9. Two practice sessions were held, and nine drivers participated. No incidents were reported, but rain fell during the part of the day. Roberto Moreno, competing full-time in the CART series for the first time since 1986, took part in a refresher test. CART series rookie Alex Zanardi set the fastest lap of the day.

Top Practice Speeds
Pos	No.	Driver	Team	Chassis	Engine	Speed
1	4	(Italy) Alex Zanardi R	Chip Ganassi Racing	Reynard	Honda	219.482
2	34	(Brazil) Roberto Moreno	Payton/Coyne Racing	Lola	Ford-Cosworth	218.196
3	10	(United States) Eddie Lawson R	Galles Racing	Lola	Mercedes-Benz Ilmor	217.451
REPORT

=== Friday May 10 ===
Two practice sessions were scheduled for Friday May 10, a morning session and an afternoon session. Due to rain, however, the afternoon session was cancelled. A total of 27 drivers took laps, with no incidents reported. Many of the drivers reported that the reduction in downforce and the reduction in turbocharger boost made driving the track more difficult than in previous years. Honda-powered machines swept the top four spots, with Adrián Fernández the fastest for the day.

Top Practice Speeds
Pos	No.	Driver	Team	Chassis	Engine	Speed
1	32	(Mexico) Adrián Fernández	Tasman Motorsports	Lola	Honda	233.402
2	31	(Brazil) André Ribeiro	Tasman Motorsports	Lola	Honda	230.103
3	21	(Brazil) Gil de Ferran	Jim Hall Racing	Reynard	Honda	229.834
REPORT

=== Saturday May 11 ===
On the morning of Saturday May 11, the next practice session was held. Cold temperatures, high winds, and light snow flurries were reported. Adrián Fernández (235.608 mph) once again led the speed chart, but the lap was aided by a tow. Paul Tracy was second-fastest. Scott Pruett reportedly suffered mechanical problems, and would switch to a back-up car for qualifying.

Top Practice Speeds
Pos	No.	Driver	Team	Chassis	Engine	Speed
1	32	(Mexico) Adrián Fernández	Tasman Motorsports	Lola	Honda	235.608
2	31	(Canada) Paul Tracy	Team Penske	Penske PC-25	Mercedes-Benz Ilmor	235.411
3	21	(Brazil) Gil de Ferran	Jim Hall Racing	Reynard	Honda	234.959
REPORT

==== Pole qualifying ====
Pole qualifying was scheduled to begin at approximately 1 p.m., with a $100,000 bonus going to the pole position winner. Temperatures were in the mid-to-low 40s (°F) with strong winds, and a wind chill of 28 °F. Cars were permitted up to four warm-up laps which were followed by two timed laps. The final results were based on the best single lap (a "best of two" format), and the grid would line up in rows of three. Bryan Herta was the first driver out to qualify, and he would wind up putting his car on the outside of the front row.

Penske drivers Al Unser Jr. and Paul Tracy reported wastegate issues, which slowed their speeds. On his first attempt, Emerson Fittipaldi took the green flag, but pulled in to the pits with an engine issue. He was able to make a second attempt, and qualified 9th. Gil de Ferran blew an engine, but was able to qualify in a back-up car. Jimmy Vasser, with his first lap at 232.025 mph, won the pole position. A total of 26 cars completed runs. Teo Fabi, who fractured his foot in a bicycle accident the previous weekend, did not make an attempt, and was expected to withdraw. P. J. Jones did not make an attempt, while rumors were circulating that Mario Andretti might come out of retirement to make a qualifying attempt.

Qualifying Results
Pos	No.	Driver	Speed
1	12	(United States) Jimmy Vasser	232.025
2	32	(Mexico) Adrián Fernández	231.108
3	28	(United States) Bryan Herta	230.774
4	4	(Italy) Alex Zanardi R	230.751
5	2	(United States) Al Unser Jr.	230.213
6	31	(Brazil) André Ribeiro	229.710
7	3	(Canada) Paul Tracy	228.980
8	9	(Brazil) Emerson Fittipaldi	227.816
9	20	(United States) Scott Pruett	227.718
10	1	(Brazil) Raul Boesel	227.561
11	6	(United States) Michael Andretti	226.602
12	11	(Brazil) Christian Fittipaldi	226.246
13	8	(Brazil) Gil de Ferran	225.957
14	17	(Brazil) Maurício Gugelmin	225.625
15	18	(United States) Bobby Rahal	225.464
16	49	(United States) Parker Johnstone	224.372
17	99	(Canada) Greg Moore R	224.025
18	10	(United States) Eddie Lawson R	221.618
19	21	(United Kingdom) Mark Blundell R	221.487
20	34	(Brazil) Roberto Moreno	221.447
21	5	(United States) Robby Gordon	220.877
22	16	(Sweden) Stefan Johansson	219.081
23	15	(Sweden) Fredrik Ekblom R	218.501
24	25	(United States) Jeff Krosnoff R	217.341
25	19	(Japan) Hiro Matsushita	216.04
26	36	(Argentina) Juan Manuel Fangio II	209.476
27	37	(Italy) Teo Fabi	no speed
28	98	(United States) P. J. Jones	no speed
REPORT

=== Sunday May 12 ===
Second round qualifying was scheduled for Sunday May 12, but no cars elected to make a qualifying attempt. Once again, unseasonably cold temperatures, snow flurries, and winds chills in the mid-20s (°F) made for difficult and uncomfortable conditions. Approximately 3,000 spectators were in attendance. A three-hour practice session was held, with 22 drivers taking laps. Paul Tracy was the fastest of the afternoon. Mario Andretti took laps in modified 1994 Lola carrying an IMAX camera, filming scenes for the upcoming documentary film Super Speedway. Andretti confirmed that he would not make an attempt to qualify for the race. After practice, the teams departed. Several teams were planning to test at other venues before returning to Michigan on May 24.

Top Practice Speeds
Pos	No.	Driver	Team	Chassis	Engine	Speed
1	3	(Canada) Paul Tracy	Team Penske	Penske PC-25	Mercedes-Benz Ilmor	232.889
2	12	(United States) Jimmy Vasser	Chip Ganassi Racing	Reynard	Honda	231.567
3	4	(Italy) Alex Zanardi R	Chip Ganassi Racing	Reynard	Honda	230.734
REPORT

=== Friday May 24 ===
The teams returned to Michigan after an 11-day layoff. During practice, the first major crash occurred. Coming out of turn two, Paul Tracy came up quickly on the car of teammate Al Unser Jr. He tried to go around on the outside, but hit the outside wall. Tracy spun across the track, and made contact with Hiro Matsushita. Tracy's car suffered heavy damage to the front left suspension, but since it was his back-up car, he would still be able to start as normal on race day. Matsushita's car suffered heavy damage, but neither driver was injured.

Three practice sessions were held Friday. Alex Zanardi turned the fastest practice lap of the day. Adrian Fernandez was injured when a piece of carbon fiber became lodged in his left eye.

Top Practice Speeds
Pos	No.	Driver	Team	Chassis	Engine	Speed
1	4	(Italy) Alex Zanardi R	Chip Ganassi Racing	Reynard	Honda	232.961
2	32	(Mexico) Adrián Fernández	Tasman Motorsports	Lola	Honda	232.524
3	12	(United States) Jimmy Vasser	Chip Ganassi Racing	Reynard	Honda	232.443
REPORT

==== Third round qualifying ====
Gary Bettenhausen arrived at the track, attempting to qualify for his first Indy car race since 1993. Bettenhausen managed only a handful of practice laps, with the car suffering boost control and popoff valve problems. The team decided to put the car in the qualifying line anyway, and he took the green flag after only three warmup laps. Bettenhausen turned a lap of 208.607 mph, then suffered engine failure on the second lap. Though he was slowest car in the field, it was enough to make the starting grid.

P. J. Jones, the only other non-qualified driver withdrew. He announced instead that he would make his CART debut at Milwaukee the following weekend.

Qualifying Results
Pos	No.	Driver	Speed
27	26	(United States) Gary Bettenhausen	208.607
REPORT

=== Saturday May 25 ===
The final practice was held Saturday May 25. Scott Pruett was the fastest driver for the day. No incidents were reported.

Top Practice Speeds
Pos	No.	Driver	Team	Chassis	Engine	Speed
1	20	(United States) Scott Pruett	Patrick Racing	Lola	Ford-Cosworth	232.885
2	12	(United States) Jimmy Vasser	Chip Ganassi Racing	Reynard	Honda	232.534
REPORT

== Starting grid ==
Row	Inside	Middle	Outside
1	(United States) Jimmy Vasser	(Mexico) Adrián Fernández	(United States) Bryan Herta
2	(Italy) Alex Zanardi R	(United States) Al Unser Jr.	(Brazil) André Ribeiro
3	(Canada) Paul Tracy	(Brazil) Emerson Fittipaldi	(United States) Scott Pruett
4	(Brazil) Raul Boesel	(United States) Michael Andretti	(Brazil) Christian Fittipaldi
5	(Brazil) Gil de Ferran	(Brazil) Maurício Gugelmin	(United States) Bobby Rahal
6	(United States) Parker Johnstone	(Canada) Greg Moore R	(United States) Eddie Lawson R
7	(United Kingdom) Mark Blundell R	(Brazil) Roberto Moreno	(United States) Robby Gordon
8	(Sweden) Stefan Johansson	(Sweden) Fredrik Ekblom R	(United States) Jeff Krosnoff R
9	(Japan) Hiro Matsushita	(Argentina) Juan Manuel Fangio II	(United States) Gary Bettenhausen

Drivers eliminated in the pace lap crash
Drivers involved in the pace lap crash; made repairs or switched to a back-up car for the restart
R 1996 CART series rookie

=== Failed to qualify ===
- Teo Fabi (#37) - Withdrew due to non-racing related injury
- P. J. Jones (#98) - Withdrew

== Race ==
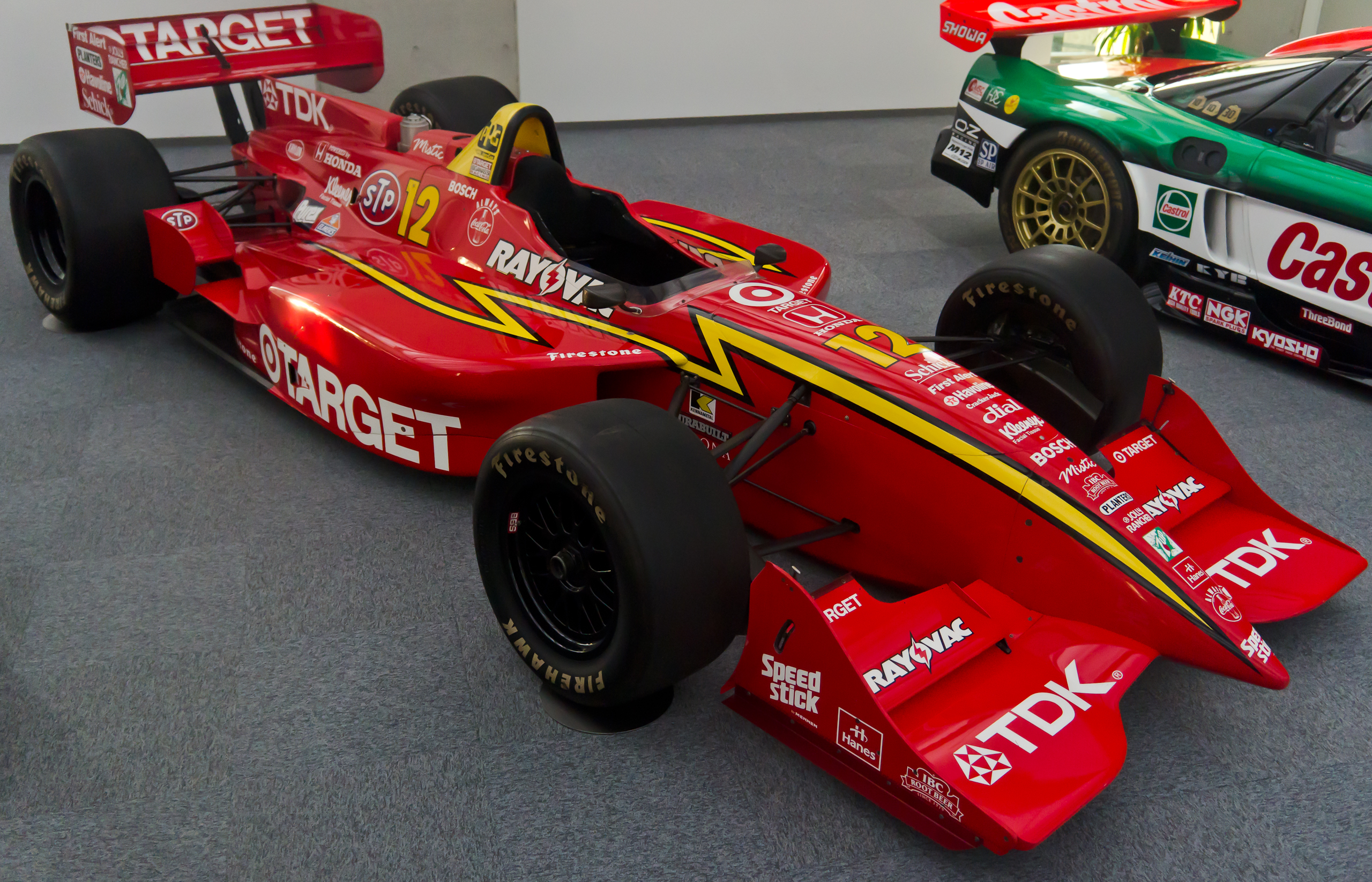
Jimmy Vasser's 1996 Reynard 96I (in road course trim).

Race day dawned overcast and cool, with a slight chance of showers. The green flag was scheduled for just after 2 p.m. (eastern), about two hours after the start of the Indy 500. Television coverage was live on ESPN. Governor John Engler gave the command to start engines. Series officials announced several new experimental rules before the race. At the onset of caution, the pits will immediately be closed. After the field is bunched up behind the pace car, the pits will be open the first time around for lead lap cars. The next time around, the pits will be open to lapped cars. The pit road speed limit was reduced from 110 mph to 80 mph, and stop-and-go penalties were replaced with the drive-through penalty. Two-wide restarts will be utilized, with lead lap cars on the outside, and lapped cars to the inside. Finally, drivers may not pass on a restart until after they cross the start/finish line.

A moment of silence was held to honor Scott Brayton, who was killed at Indianapolis on May 17. Each car carried a decal in memory of Brayton.

=== Pace lap crash ===
The field of 27 cars lined up in nine rows of three, mimicking the traditional starting grid at Indy, as well as Michigan 500 races of years past. The field was given three warm-up laps. Around this time, the Indy 500 was approaching lap 110. On the third and final pace lap, the field assembled tightly into the three-wide grid down the backstretch. The pace car dropped off and the front row, consisting of Jimmy Vasser (inside), Adrián Fernández (middle), and Bryan Herta (outside) led the field into turn four. As the cars accelerated through turn four, just seconds before the green flag was to be displayed, the left front wheel of Fernández's car clipped the right rear wheel of Vasser's car. Vasser's car pivoted sharply to the right, collecting the car of Herta, and both crashed hard into the outside wall. Fernández spun wildly to the inside, and a melee broke out behind them. No less than twelve cars became caught up in a huge pileup. Some cars spun or veered to the infield grass to avoid contact. Among the cars that avoided contact were Alex Zanardi, Al Unser Jr., Paul Tracy, and Michael Andretti. Parker Johnstone claimed he narrowly avoided a flying suspension piece, and Andretti said a tire flew over his head.

The red flag was displayed instantly, and the start was aborted. Vasser and Herta climbed from their cars, both visibly angry. No drivers were seriously injured, but the track was littered with debris and numerous wrecked cars were stopped on the track or parked in the infield grass. Safety crew tended to the scene and pit crews began scrambling to find spare parts and roll out back-up cars. Several drivers expressed frustration about the perceived slowness of the start by polesitter Vasser. Officials declared that since the green flag never came out, all participants were permitted to make repairs under the red flag, and/or switch to back-up machines. Involved in the crash were: Vasser, Fernández, Herta, André Ribeiro, Emerson Fittipaldi, Gil de Ferran, Maurício Gugelmin, Parker Johnstone, Eddie Lawson, Fredrik Ekblom, Jeff Krosnoff, and Juan Manuel Fangio II. Other cars suffered minor damage, including Raul Boesel.

Fittipaldi, de Ferran, Gugelmin, Johnstone, and Lawson all managed to make repairs. Vasser, Herta, Ribeiro, Ekblom, Krosnoff, and Fangio each switched to back-up cars. The grid was reassembled in pit lane, and drivers climbed into their cockpits, with some crew members still performing last-minute fixes and adjustments. Fernández's team tried to make the necessary repairs, but were unsuccessful. They claimed that their car was the last to be towed back to the pits, which offered them insufficient time to inspect the damage much less make repairs. They ran out of time to switch to their back-up machine and elected to drop out of the race. Fernández was the only car to not line up for the second start attempt, and placed last.

=== Start ===
After a red flag delay of 1 hour and 1 minute, 26 cars lined up for a second attempt at a start. Almost half the field consisted of back-ups, or cars with repairs (some finished hastily). By this time, the Indy 500 was on about lap 172 (28 laps to go). With Adrián Fernández officially out of the race, only two cars made up the front row. A rather strung-out start saw polesitter Jimmy Vasser jump the start, and he held a sizeable lead when the green flag dropped. Al Unser Jr. and Alex Zanardi moved into second and third, with Bryan Herta slipping down to fourth. At the end of lap 2, Scott Pruett blew an engine on the frontstretch, bringing out the first caution of the day.

The green flag was back out on lap 8, with Vasser leading, Zanardi second, and Unser third. Michael Andretti moved past Emerson Fittipaldi at start/finish line, then got by Unser going into turn three. Only three laps later, however, the yellow was out again, this time for a blown engine by Fredrik Ekblom (incidentally, the first of the back-up cars to suffer mechanical problems).

After the subsequent restart, Alex Zanardi chased down his teammate Jimmy Vasser and took the lead for the first time on lap 18. The yellow came out for debris on lap 23, and most of the leaders headed to pit lane for their first scheduled pit stops. The green was back out on lap 28 with Maurício Gugelmin and Roberto Moreno cycled to the front. Gugelmin and Moreno each led a handful of laps before Zanardi easily chased them down. Zanardi was back in the lead by lap 37.

=== First half ===
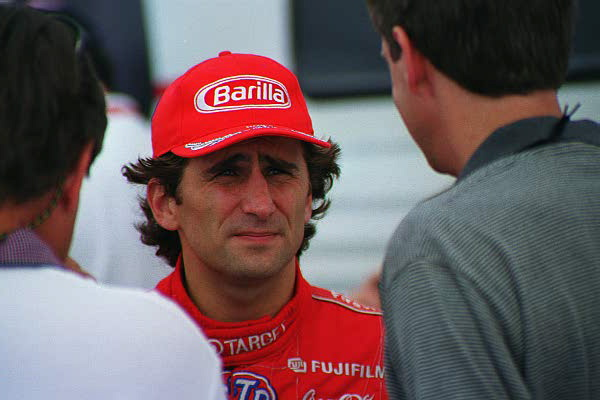
Alex Zanardi led the most laps.

Alex Zanardi dominated the first half, as attrition began to take its toll on several of the contenders. Raul Boesel, Michael Andretti, and Robby Gordon all dropped out with mechanical problems. Zanardi led Vasser, André Ribeiro, Greg Moore, and Mark Blundell. Penske teammates Al Unser Jr. and Paul Tracy began suffering from handling problems, as was Emerson Fittipaldi in the Hogan-Penske entry. All three began slipping down the standings, and none of the three would be factors for the rest of the afternoon.

On lap 84, Gary Bettenhausen (running about 5 laps down) went high and crashed in turn four. Bettenhausen believed he cut a tire, which pushed him into the wall. With fluids pouring from the machine, a lengthy caution was needed to clean up the incident.

Zanardi continued to lead, chased by Moore, Ribeiro, and Vasser. Bobby Rahal climbed as high as sixth, but soon slipped out of the top ten with a pushing condition. At the halfway point, Zanadri led Ribeiro by 8.3 seconds.

=== Second half ===
On lap 128, Bobby Rahal, battling understeer, drifted high exiting turn two and brushed the outside wall. The yellow came out for contact, and Rahal circulated two additional laps before pulling into the pits. Rahal was out of the race with suspension damage. The field prepared to restart on lap 132, but the restart was waved off. Officials noticed that André Ribeiro (who had pitted just before the yellow for Rahal's incident) was lined up with the lapped cars. He had been inadvertently trapped behind the pace car. They corrected the error by waving him around so he could make up the lap. Meanwhile, Eddie Lawson was sent to the back of the line for a blend-line violation. The race was finally restarted at lap 138.

Alex Zanardi continued to lead, with Jimmy Vasser, Greg Moore, Mark Blundell, Bryan Herta, and Gil de Ferran among those still on the lead lap. On lap 146, de Ferran went to the pits for an unscheduled stop. The pop-off valve gasket failed, and he lost five laps as the crew made repairs. At the same time, Jeff Krosnoff blew an engine, bringing out the 7th caution of the day.

The green came back out with 98 laps to go. Eight cars were still on the lead lap. The Ganassi teammates of Zanardi and Vasser ran 1st-2nd, running laps in the 230 mph range. Greg Moore and André Ribeiro were racing for 3rd-4th on lap 160 when Moore spun coming out of turn two. The back end came around, and the car spun through the infield grass. Moore did not make any contact, and was able to drive back to the pits to change tires. Under the yellow, Vasser and Zanardi had trouble in the pits. Vasser's team dropped the jacks before the left rear tire was attached, while Zanardi slid past his marks. The team had to roll the car backwards in order to engage the fuel hose. Christian Fittipaldi broke the pneumatic jacks on his car, prompting an extra stop for examination, as well as forcing the team to revert to manual jacks. He would later fall out with engine failure.

After the pit stops were completed, Parker Johnstone moved into the lead, with Ribeiro second, and Herta third. Vasser and Zanardi dropped back to 5th and 7th, respectively. The green flag came back out on lap 168. Zanardi and Vasser began charging immediately, dicing aggressively through traffic to catch the leaders. By lap 174, they were running 2nd and 3rd behind Johnstone; but one lap later, Zanardi's engine blew with a huge plume of smoke down the frontstretch. When the racing resumed, Johnstone continued to lead, with Mark Blundell second, and Vasser third.

With 50 laps to go, Johnstone was caught behind the slower car of Hiro Matsushita. Vasser dove high in turn one and took the lead for the first time since the early going. The race was expected to come down to the final round of pit stops. Vasser made his final stop from the lead on lap 207; that handed the lead back to Johnstone. But seconds later while going down the backstretch, Johnstone's car ran out of fuel. He was towed back to the pits, and fell two laps down.

Bryan Herta and Greg Moore both suffered blown engines. Johnstone, after running out of fuel, dropped out with a broken gearbox. Only three cars were left running on the lead lap.

=== Finish ===
With twenty laps to go, André Ribeiro led Maurício Gugelmin and Jimmy Vasser. Vasser got by Gugelmin for second, and set his sights on the lead. With ten laps to go, Ribeiro and Vasser were running nose-to-tail. Coming out of turn four Ribeiro suddenly ducked into pit lane with fuel pickup problems. Ribeiro's car - one of the backup cars rolled out - did not have proper working fuel telemetry (the components had not been transferred over from the wrecked primary car). This left the crew unsure of their fuel situation. He needed a splash-and-go pit stop to make it to the finish, which handed the lead to Jimmy Vasser. Vasser led the final 9 laps to victory. At the finish, flagman Jim Swintell waved the checkered flag along with the American flag.

Maurício Gugelmin finished second, the only other car on the lead lap. A total of eleven cars were running at the finish. Roberto Moreno placed third, his first podium in CART competition. Vasser celebrated in victory lane, sarcastically quipping "who needs milk?" - a thinly veiled jab at the Indy 500 victory lane tradition.

== Box score ==
Finish	Start	No	Name	Team	Chassis	Engine	Tire	Laps	Status
1	1	12	(United States) Jimmy Vasser	Chip Ganassi Racing	Reynard 96I	Honda	F	250	156.403 mph
2	14	17	(Brazil) Maurício Gugelmin	PacWest Racing	Reynard 96I	Ford-Cosworth XB	G	250	+10.995 seconds
3	20	34	(Brazil) Roberto Moreno	Payton/Coyne Racing	Lola T96/00	Ford-Cosworth XB	G	249	-1 lap
4	6	31	(Brazil) André Ribeiro	Tasman Motorsports	Lola T96/00	Honda	F	249	-1 lap
5	19	21	(United Kingdom) Mark Blundell R	PacWest Racing	Reynard 96I	Ford-Cosworth XB	G	249	-1 lap
6	18	10	(United States) Eddie Lawson R	Galles Racing	Lola T96/00	Mercedes-Benz Ilmor	G	249	-1 lap
7	7	3	(Canada) Paul Tracy	Team Penske	Penske PC-25	Mercedes-Benz Ilmor	G	248	-2 laps
8	5	2	(United States) Al Unser Jr.	Team Penske	Penske PC-25	Mercedes-Benz Ilmor	G	246	-4 laps
9	13	8	(Brazil) Gil de Ferran	Jim Hall Racing	Reynard 96I	Honda	G	245	-5 laps
10	8	9	(Brazil) Emerson Fittipaldi	Hogan Penske Racing	Penske PC-25	Mercedes-Benz Ilmor	G	241	-9 laps
11	16	49	(United States) Parker Johnstone	Comptech Racing	Reynard 96I	Honda	F	236	Gearbox
12	12	11	(Brazil) Christian Fittipaldi	Newman/Haas Racing	Lola T96/00	Ford-Cosworth XD	G	232	Engine
13	17	99	(Canada) Greg Moore R	Forsythe Racing	Reynard 96I	Mercedes-Benz Ilmor	F	225	Engine
14	25	19	(Japan) Hiro Matsushita	Payton/Coyne Racing	Lola T96/00	Ford-Cosworth XB	F	217	-33 laps
15	3	28	(United States) Bryan Herta	Team Rahal	Reynard 96I	Mercedes-Benz Ilmor	G	216	Engine
16	22	16	(Sweden) Stefan Johansson	Bettenhausen Racing	Reynard 96I	Mercedes-Benz Ilmor	G	195	Engine
17	4	4	(Italy) Alex Zanardi R	Chip Ganassi Racing	Reynard 96I	Honda	F	175	Engine
18	24	25	(United States) Jeff Krosnoff R	Arciero-Wells Racing	Reynard 96I	Toyota	F	143	Engine
19	15	18	(United States) Bobby Rahal	Team Rahal	Reynard 96I	Mercedes-Benz Ilmor	G	130	Accident T2
20	21	5	(United States) Robby Gordon	Walker Racing	Reynard 96I	Ford-Cosworth XD	G	94	Engine
21	27	26	(United States) Gary Bettenhausen	Bettenhausen Racing	Penske PC-23	Mercedes-Benz Ilmor	G	79	Accident T4
22	26	36	(Argentina) Juan Manuel Fangio II	All American Racers	Eagle Mk-V	Toyota	G	69	Engine
23	11	6	(United States) Michael Andretti	Newman/Haas Racing	Lola T96/00	Ford-Cosworth XB	G	67	Mechanical
24	10	1	(Brazil) Raul Boesel	Team Green	Reynard 96I	Ford-Cosworth	G	54	Electrical
25	23	15	(Sweden) Fredrik Ekblom R	Walker Racing	Reynard 96I	Ford-Cosworth XD	G	11	Engine
26	9	20	(United States) Scott Pruett	Patrick Racing	Lola T96/00	Ford-Cosworth XD	F	3	Engine
27	2	32	(Mexico) Adrián Fernández	Tasman Motorsports	Lola T96/00	Honda	F	0	Accident

R CART series rookie

=== Statistics ===
Lap Leaders
Laps	Leader
1-18	Jimmy Vasser
19-25	Alex Zanardi
26-28	Maurício Gugelmin
29-30	Roberto Moreno
31-36	Maurício Gugelmin
37-163	Alex Zanardi
164-165	Greg Moore
166-199	Parker Johnstone
200-206	Jimmy Vasser
207	Parker Johnstone
208-240	André Ribeiro
241-250	Jimmy Vasser

Total laps led
Laps	Leader
134	Alex Zanardi
35	Jimmy Vasser
35	Parker Johnstone
33	André Ribeiro
9	Maurício Gugelmin
2	Roberto Moreno
2	Greg Moore

Cautions: 12 for 78 laps
Laps	Reason
Pace lap	(Red flag) Multi-car crash turn 4
3-6	Pruett blown engine
11-14	Ekblom blown engine
23-27	Debris
47-53	Fangio tow-in
84-96	Bettenhausen crash in turn 4
128-137	Rahal hit wall in turn 2
147-152	Fluid on track
160-166	Moore spin turn 2
175-182	Zanardi blown engine
209-214	Johnstone tow-in
217-220	Herta tow-in
224-227	Moore blown engine

- Source

== Standings after the race ==
Drivers' Championship standings

Pos	Driver	Points
1	Jimmy Vasser	94
2	Al Unser Jr.	58
3	Scott Pruett	49
4	André Ribeiro	40
5	Gil de Ferran	37
6	Greg Moore	36
7	Christian Fittipaldi	33
8	Michael Andretti	31
9	Paul Tracy	31
10	Maurício Gugelmin	28
11	Bobby Rahal	26
12	Roberto Moreno	22

== Broadcasting ==
=== Television ===
For 1996, CART had existing television contracts with both ABC and ESPN. The IRL signed a contract with ABC for their first season, and for part of their second season. The Indianapolis 500 would be carried live on ABC. CART shopped around the television rights for the U.S. 500 to several major networks including CBS, FOX, TBS, and ESPN. A promising deal with CBS ultimately fell through, while TBS elected to focus on their coverage of the Coca-Cola 600. On January 18, 1996, a television deal was announced with ESPN. However, as part of the deal, the start time of the U.S. 500 was shifted to 2 p.m. (eastern), roughly two hours after the start of the Indy 500. As a result, the two races were only expected to overlap for about an hour or so.

With regular anchor Paul Page at Indy, ESPN's Formula One commentator Bob Varsha took the role of host and play-by-play announcer. Scott Goodyear, who was recovering from a back injury suffered at Rio, served as color commentator. ESPN also carried live coverage of pole qualifying on Saturday May 11. With the Indy 500 blacked out in the Indianapolis area (until the evening), the U.S. 500 was the only race of the two which was shown live in the Indianapolis market. The U.S. 500 telecast was also rerun at night on ESPN2.

The ESPN broadcast had a 2.8 TV rating and was watched by 1,904,000 households. This set a new record for the most-watched open-wheel race on a cable network. The previous record was held by the 1993 CART race at New Hampshire which had a 2.1 rating and 1,281,000 households.

ESPN Television
Booth Announcers	Pit/garage reporters
Host/Announcer: Bob Varsha; Color: Scott Goodyear	Marty Reid; James Allen; Jon Beekhuis

=== Radio ===
The race was carried live on the CART IndyCar Radio Network. Lou Palmer served as chief announcer with Tom Michaels, Larry Henry and Sally Larvick.

== Legacy ==
Following the 1996 season, CART decided not to run the U.S. 500 opposite the Indianapolis 500 again. The success of the event was questionable, and the reasons to continue the event were the subject of considerable debate. The teams and sponsors wanted to race on Memorial Day weekend, but almost no one was interested in going head-to-head with Indy again. Teams were against running two 500-mile races at Michigan in the same season. With three races in the area, the U.S. 500 was also believed to have hurt attendance two weeks later at Detroit, as well as at the traditional Michigan 500 in July.

Some drivers and observers felt that the event did not live up to the hype, and failed to establish itself as a crown jewel. Motorsports writer for the Los Angeles Times, Shav Glick, noted that the 1996 U.S. 500 was promoted "as if it were the Super Bowl", but in 1997 it was "being conducted with no more vigor than any other race at say, Milwaukee, Mid-Ohio or Vancouver." CART CEO Andrew Craig then attempted to shift the series attitude towards promoting the season championship as the ultimate prize rather than a single major race.

From 1997 to 1999, rather than stage a head-to-head race, on the day before the Indianapolis 500, CART held the Motorola 300 at the newly-opened Gateway International Raceway as their Memorial Day weekend alternative. This race, however, experienced much less interest, and was eventually moved to August.

While the 500-mile race in May was discontinued, the name U.S. 500 however, was kept for a time. From 1997 to 1999 the name was used for the annual 500-mile race at Michigan in July (the race formerly known as the Michigan 500 and later the Marlboro 500). The Marlboro 500 name was shifted over to a brand new race at the newly-opened California Speedway.

In 2000, the U.S. 500 moniker was dropped permanently as the race name was changed to the Michigan 500 presented by Toyota. In its final year as a CART race (2001) the July race was known as the Harrah's 500. In 2002, the race switched alliances to the Indy Racing League, and became what was known as the Firestone Indy 400. After 2007, Indy cars stopped racing at Michigan, and (as of 2024) have never returned.

=== Past winners of the U.S. 500 ===
Season	Date	Race Name	Winning driver	Chassis	Engine	Team	Report
1996	May 26	Inaugural U.S. 500	(United States) Jimmy Vasser	Reynard	Honda	Chip Ganassi Racing	
1997	July 27	U. S. 500 Presented by Toyota	(Italy) Alex Zanardi	Reynard	Honda	Chip Ganassi Racing	report
1998	July 26	U. S. 500 Presented by Toyota	(Canada) Greg Moore	Reynard	Mercedes	Forsythe Racing	report
1999	July 25	U. S. 500 Presented by Toyota	(Brazil) Tony Kanaan	Reynard	Honda	Forsythe Racing	report

Previous race: 1996 Bosch Spark Plug Grand Prix	PPG Indy Car World Series; 1996 season	Next race: 1996 Miller Genuine Draft 200
Previous race: Inaugural race	1996 U.S. 500	Next race: 1997 U.S. 500
