= Andy Brown (engineer) =

British engineer

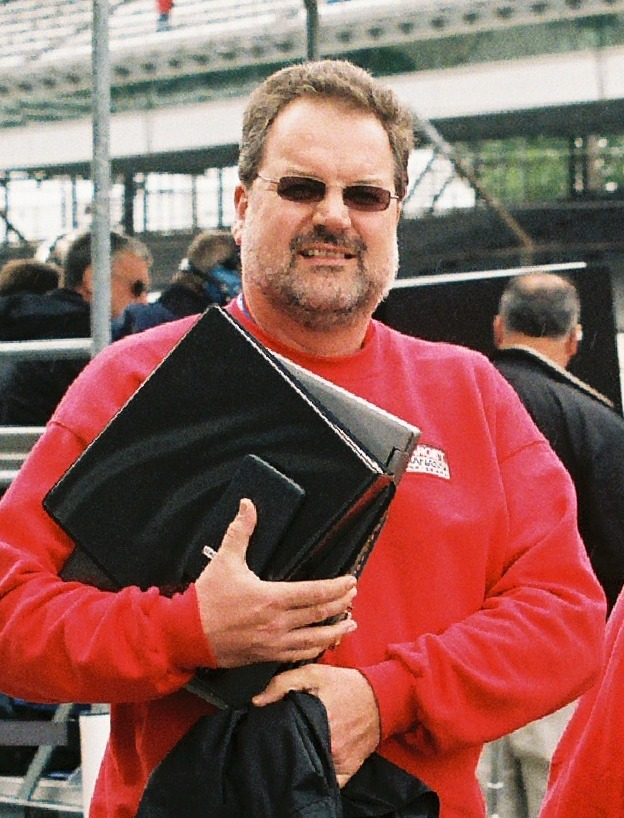
Brown in 2006

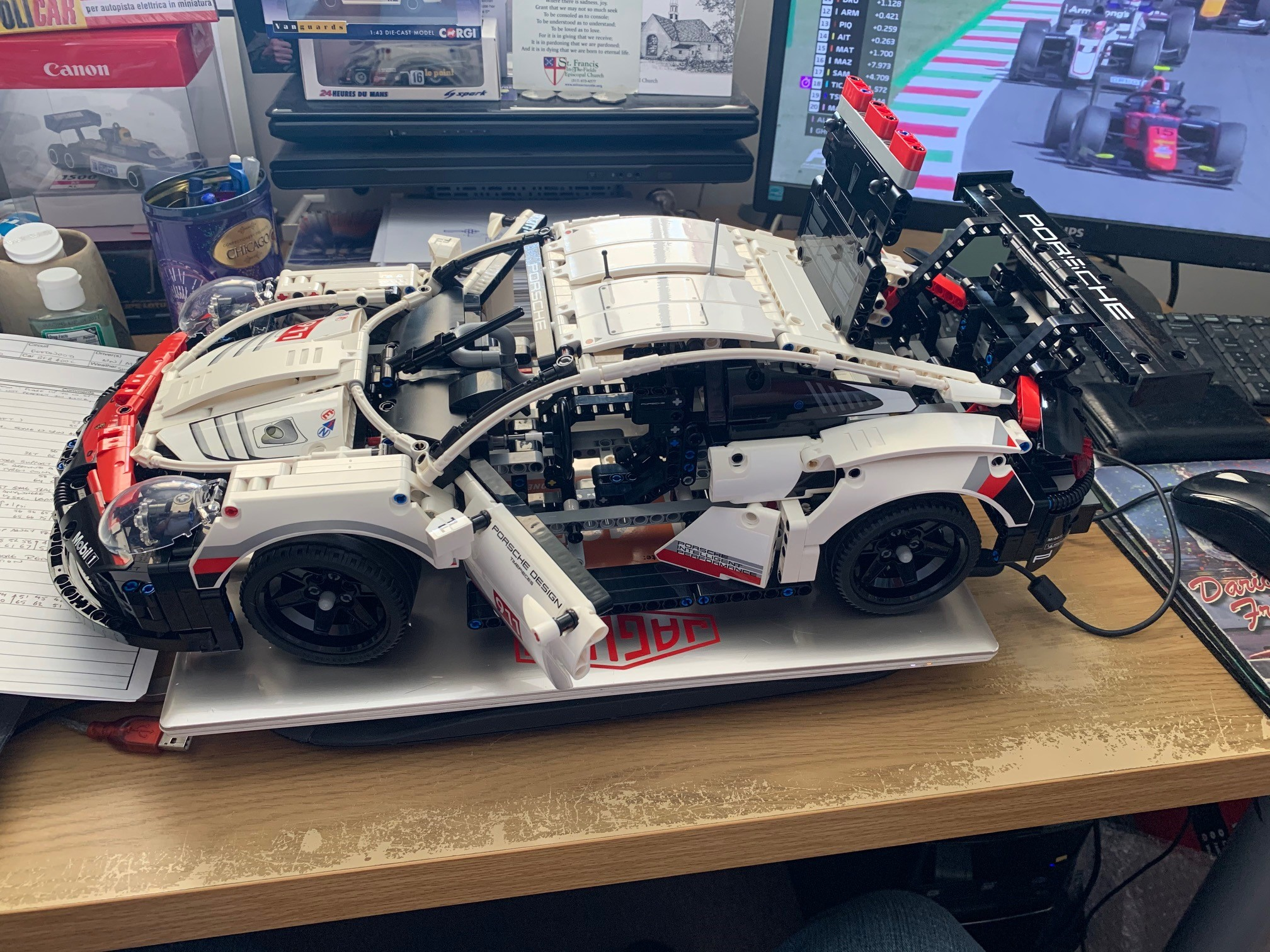
Porsche built by Brown

Andy Brown is a British engineer currently running his own motor sports engineering company, ACB Consultancy Ltd.

== Career ==
Brown studied aeronautical engineering at the University of Bath graduating in 1981. He then joined British Aerospace at Filton, Bristol (now Airbus), before leaving in 1984 to join March Engineering. He was there until the end of 1990, the last three years being with the March-Leyton House Formula One team as race engineer.

In 1991, Brown joined Brabham as chief race engineer with primary responsibility for Martin Brundle's car. Brown left the world of Formula One to join Galmer Engineering as assistant technical director. In 1992 they won the Indy 500 with a car of their own design.

Brown later became a founding member and chief engineer for PacWest Racing, where they set a new closed course world record of 240.9 mph (387.7 km/h) at Fontana, California in 1997. Following this he joined Panther Racing as chief engineer for the 1999 season subsequently winning back-to-back Indy Racing League series championships in 2001 and 2002.

Brown left Panther Racing at the end of 2005 to join Chip Ganassi Racing as race engineer for the No. 10 Target Honda-powered Dallara driven by 2005 IndyCar Series and Indianapolis 500 champion Dan Wheldon. He stepped back from race engineering for the 2008 season to concentrate on R&D work, mainly aerodynamics.

For 2011, Brown returned to the UK and created ACB Consultancy Ltd., but with his Indycar background most of the company's business interests are naturally still in the USA, the main customers being Chip Ganassi Racing and Honda Performance Development. But with a shortage of such specialised knowledge in the UK, media work, reporting on Indycar activities, has been forthcoming for both magazines and television.
