= 1992 Daikyo IndyCar Grand Prix =

Coordinates: 27°59′17.9″S 153°25′42.1″E

(Australia) 1992 Surfers Paradise
Race details
- Race 1 of 16 in the 1992 IndyCar season
- Map of the track
- Date: 22 March, 1992
- Official name: 1992 Daikyo IndyCar Grand Prix
- Location: Surfers Paradise Street Circuit; Queensland, Australia
- Course: Temporary Street Circuit; 2.794 mi / 4.496 km
- Distance: 65 laps 181.610 mi / 292.240 km
- Weather: Partly cloudy with drizzle and subsequent heavy downpours; Air temp: 27.2 °C (80.9 °F).

Pole position
- Driver: Al Unser Jr. (Newman-Haas Racing)
- Time: 1:38.744

Podium
- First: Emerson Fittipaldi (Marlboro Team Penske)
- Second: Rick Mears (Marlboro Team Penske)
- Third: Bobby Rahal (Rahal-Hogan Racing)

The 1992 Daikyo IndyCar Grand Prix was the opening round of the 1992 PPG Indy Car World Series, held on 22 March 1992 on the Surfers Paradise Street Circuit, Queensland, Australia.

The race was won by Emerson Fittipaldi driving a Penske PC21-92 Chevrolet-Ilmor B for Team Penske.

== Qualifying results ==
Pos	Nat	Name	Team	Car	Time
1	(United States)	Al Unser Jr.	Galles-Kraco Racing	Galmer G92 Chevrolet-Ilmor A	1:38.744
2	(United States)	Michael Andretti	Newman-Haas Racing	Lola T91/00 Ford XB Cosworth	
3	(Brazil)	Emerson Fittipaldi	Team Penske	Penske PC21-92 Chevrolet-Ilmor B	
4	(United States)	Bobby Rahal	Rahal-Hogan Racing	Lola T92/00 Chevrolet-Ilmor A	
5	(United States)	Rick Mears	Team Penske	Penske PC21-92 Chevrolet-Ilmor B	
6	(United States)	Mario Andretti	Newman-Haas Racing	Lola T91/00 Ford XB Cosworth	
7	(United States)	Eddie Cheever	Chip Ganassi Racing	Lola T91/00 Ford XB Cosworth	
8	(United States)	Scott Pruett	Truesports	Truesports 92C Chevrolet-Ilmor A	
9	(Canada)	Scott Goodyear	Walker Motorsport	Lola T91/00 Chevrolet-Ilmor A	
10	(United States)	Danny Sullivan	Galles-Kraco Racing	Galmer G92 Chevrolet-Ilmor A	
11	(United States)	John Andretti	Racing Team VDS	Lola T92/00 Chevrolet-Ilmor A	
12	(United States)	Scott Brayton	Dick Simon Racing	Lola T92/00 Chevrolet-Ilmor A	
13	(Switzerland)	Gregor Foitek	Gilmore Racing	Lola T92/00 Chevrolet-Ilmor A	
14	(United States)	Tony Bettenhausen Jr.	Bettenhausen Racing	Penske PC20-91 Chevrolet-Ilmor A	
15	(Italy)	Fabrizio Barbazza	Arciero Racing	Lola T90/00 Buick	
16	(United States)	Ted Prappas	P.I.G. Enterprises	Lola T91/00 Chevrolet-Ilmor A	
17	(United States)	Jimmy Vasser	Hayhoe Racing	Lola T91/00 Chevrolet-Ilmor A	
18	(Belgium)	Éric Bachelart	Dale Coyne Racing	Lola T90/00 Cosworth DFS	
19	(Philippines)	Jovy Marcelo	Euromotorsport	Lola T91/00 Cosworth DFS	
20	(United States)	Buddy Lazier	Leader Cards Racing	Lola T90/00 Buick	
21	(Canada)	Ross Bentley	Dale Coyne Racing	Lola T90/00 Cosworth DFS	
22	(Italy)	Nicola Marozzo	Euromotorsport	Lola T91/00 Cosworth DFS	
23	(United States)	A. J. Foyt	Walker Motorsport	Lola T90/00 Cosworth DFS	
DNQ	(Japan)	Hiro Matsushita	Dick Simon Racing	Lola T91/00 Chevrolet-Ilmor A	

== Race ==
Pos	No	Driver	Team	Laps	Time/retired	Grid	Points
1	5	(Brazil) Emerson Fittipaldi	Team Penske	65	2:20:32.477	3	20
2	4	(United States) Rick Mears	Team Penske	65	+2.8 secs	5	16
3	12	(United States) Bobby Rahal	Rahal-Hogan Racing	65		4	14
4	3	(United States) Al Unser Jr.	Galles-Kraco Racing	65		1	13
5	18	(United States) Danny Sullivan	Galles-Kraco Racing	65		10	10
6	8	(United States) John Andretti	Racing Team VDS	65		11	8
7	2	(United States) Mario Andretti	Newman-Haas Racing	65		6	6
8	9	(United States) Eddie Cheever	Chip Ganassi Racing	64	+ 1 lap	7	5
9	15	(Canada) Scott Goodyear	Walker Motorsport	63	+ 2 laps	9	4
10	31	(United States) Ted Prappas	P.I.G. Enterprises	62	+ 3 laps	16	3
11	39	(Canada) Ross Bentley	Dale Coyne Racing	61	+ 4 laps	21	2
12	30	(Italy) Fabrizio Barbazza	Arciero Racing	61	+ 4 laps	15	1
13	16	(United States) Tony Bettenhausen Jr.	Bettenhausen Racing	60	+ 5 laps	14	
14	50	(Philippines) Jovy Marcelo	Euromotorsport	54	+ 11 laps	19	
15	47	(United States) Jimmy Vasser	Hayhoe Racing	48	Electrical	17	
16	21	(United States) Buddy Lazier	Leader Cards Racing	47	+ 18 laps	20	
17	1	(United States) Michael Andretti	Newman-Haas Racing	41	Broken header	2	1
18	10	(United States) Scott Pruett	Truesports	23	Transmission	8	
19	42	(Italy) Nicola Marozzo	Euromotorsport	22	Electrical	22	
20	22	(United States) Scott Brayton	Dick Simon Racing	22	Transmission	12	
21	14	(Switzerland) Gregor Foitek	Gilmore Racing	19	Puncture	13	
22	19	(Belgium) Éric Bachelart	Dale Coyne Racing	16	Oil pressure	18	
23	17	(United States) A. J. Foyt	Walker Motorsport	2	Withdrawn	23	
DNS	11	(Japan) Hiro Matsushita	Dick Simon Racing		Wrecked in practice		

== Notes ==
- Time of race 2:20:33.00
- Average Speed 77.561 mph

Previous race:	Indy Car Indycar World Series; 1992 season	Next race: 1992 Valvoline 200
Previous race: 1991 Gold Coast IndyCar Grand Prix	1992 Daikyo IndyCar Grand Prix	Next race: 1993 Australian FAI IndyCar Grand Prix
