= Juan Carlos Carbonell =

Chilean open wheel race-car driver

Juan Carlos Carbonell (born May 16, 1970), is a Chilean open wheel race-car driver. Born in Santiago, he began racing in the Chilean Formula Three Championship in 1989–1994. In 1995, he moved up to the Indy Lights, followed by the IMSA World Sports Car Series in 1996. In late 1996, he started a single race in the Indy Racing League at Las Vegas Motor Speedway. In 2010, at forty years of age, he captured his first Chilean Formula Three Championship title.

== Motorsports Career Results ==
=== American Open-Wheel ===
(key) (Races in bold indicate pole position)

==== IndyCar ====
Year	Team	1	2	3	4	5	6	7	8	9	10	Rank	Points	Ref
**1996–97**	Tempero-Giuffre Racing	NWH	LVS; 19	WDW	PHX	INDY	TXS	PPIR	CLT	NH2	LV2	**48th**	**16**	
