= Fermín Vélez =

Spanish racing driver (1959–2003)

Fermín Vélez Bisbe (April 3, 1959 – March 31, 2003) was a Spanish sports car racing driver, two-time winner of the 12 Hours of Sebring and two-time World Sportscar Championship Group C2 champion.

Vélez was a driver in the Indy Racing League, racing in the 1996–1997 seasons with six career starts, including two at the Indianapolis 500. Born in Barcelona, Spain, Vélez died there of cancer.

Vélez is honoured by the 24H Series sportscar race at the Circuit de Barcelona-Catalunya in Montmeló, where the race is called the Fermin Vélez Trophy.

== Motorsports career results ==
=== 24 Hours of Le Mans results ===
Year	Team	Co-drivers	Car	Class	Laps	Pos.	Class Pos.
1986	(United Kingdom) John Fitzpatrick Racing	(Spain) Emilio de Villota (South Africa) George Fouché	Porsche 956B	Gr.C1	349	4th	4th
1987	(United Kingdom) Spice Engineering	(United Kingdom) Gordon Spice (France) Philippe de Henning	Spice-Fiero SE86C - Cosworth	Gr.C2	321	6th	**1st**
1989	(United Kingdom) Chamberlain Engineering	(United Kingdom) Nick Adams (Italy) Luigi Taverna	Spice SE89C - Cosworth	Gr.C2	244	DNF	DNF
1990	(United Kingdom) Spice Engineering	(United Kingdom) Tim Harvey (United Kingdom) Chris Hodgetts	Spice SE90C - Cosworth	Gr.C1	308	18th	18th
1996	(United States) Rocketsports	(France) Yvan Muller (United States) Andy Evans	Ferrari 333 SP	WSC	31	DNF	DNF
1998	(United States) Doyle-Risi Racing	(Belgium) Eric van de Poele (South Africa) Wayne Taylor	Ferrari 333 SP	LMP1	332	8th	**1st**

=== Complete International Formula 3000 results ===
(key) (Races in bold indicate pole position) (Races in italics indicate fastest lap)

Year	Entrant	1	2	3	4	5	6	7	8	9	10	11	DC	Points
1988	Repsol Silk Cut Racing	JER; DNQ	VAL; 13	PAU; DNQ	SIL; DNQ	MNZ	PER; 14	BRH; DNQ	BIR; 12	BUG; 15	ZOL	DIJ	NC	0

=== American open wheel ===
(key)

==== IndyCar Series ====
Year	Team	1	2	3	4	5	6	7	8	9	10	Rank	Points	Ref
1996	Team Scandia	WDW	PHX; 19	INDY; 21								**22nd**	**60**	
1996–1997	Team Scandia	NHM	LVS	WDW; 9	PHX; 14	INDY; 10	TXS; 25	PPIR	CLT	NH2	LV2	**26th**	**82**	

Years	Teams	Races	Poles	Wins	Podiums (non-win)	Top 10s (non-podium)	Indianapolis 500 wins	Championships
2	1	6	0	0	0	2	0	0

==== Indianapolis 500 results ====
Year	Chassis	Engine	Start	Finish	Team
1996	Lola	Ford-Cosworth	28	21	Scandia
1997	Dallara	Oldsmobile	29	10	Scandia
