= Billy Boat =

American racing driver (born 1966)

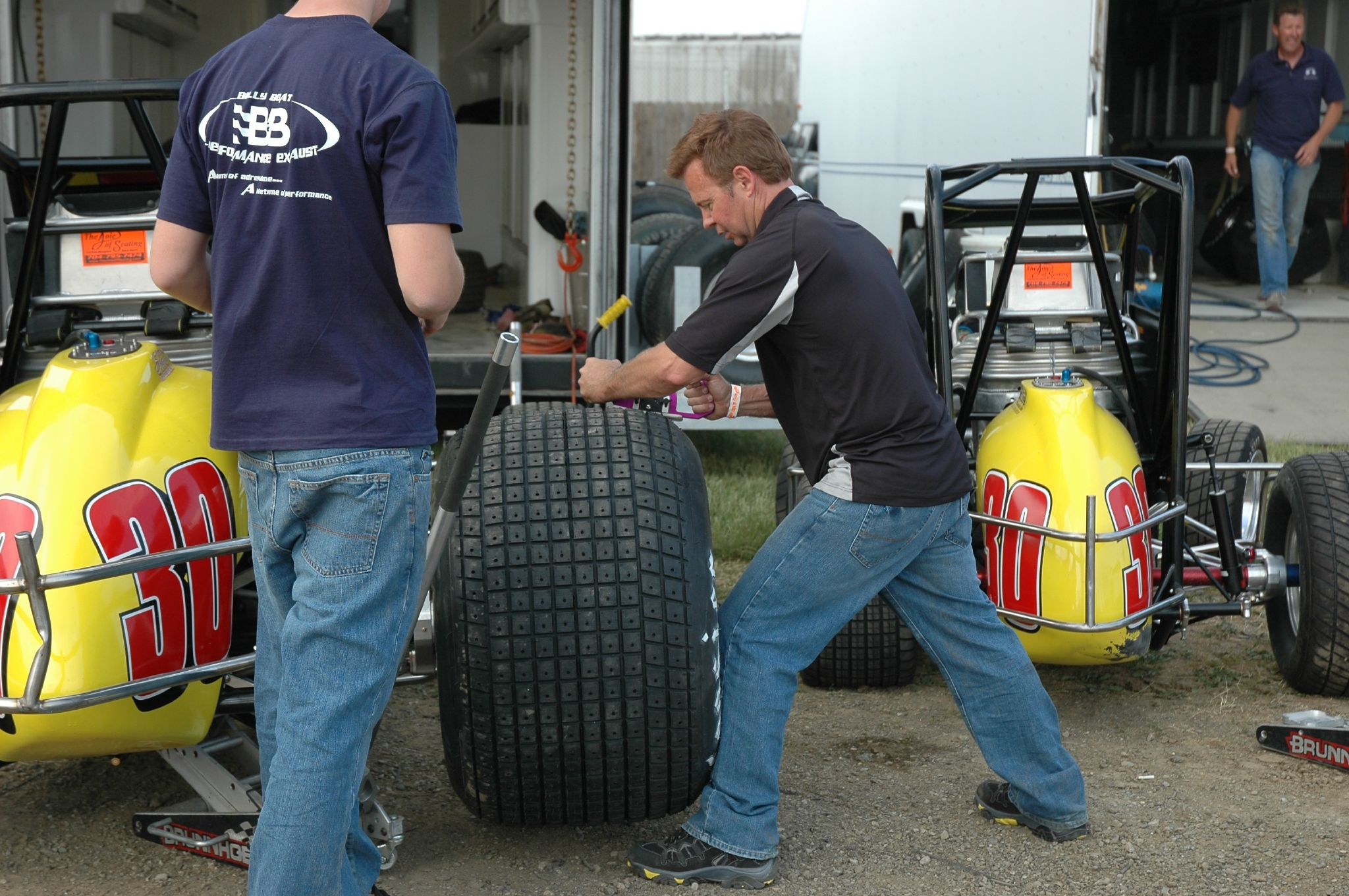
- Boat (right) preparing tires for his son Chad's sprint car in 2007
- Born: William Leonard Boat; February 2, 1966 (age 60) Phoenix, Arizona, U.S.

IndyCar Series
- Years active: 1996–2003
- Teams: A. J. Foyt Enterprises; PDM Racing; Team Pelfrey; Beck Motorsports; Curb Agajanian Performance Group; Panther Racing
- Starts: 75
- Wins: 1
- Poles: 9
- Fastest laps: 5
- Best finish: 4th in 2001

Previous series
- 1986-1987: Indy Lights

NASCAR O'Reilly Auto Parts Series career
- 1 race run over 1 year
- Best finish: 135th (2003)
- First race: 2003 Bashas' Supermarkets 200 (Phoenix)
Wins	Top tens	Poles
0	0	0

William Leonard Boat (born February 2, 1966) is an American former open-wheel driver who raced in the Indy Racing League.

== Racing career ==
Boat began his career in USAC, where he won eleven straight Western Series races on his way to the 1995 championship. He won the Turkey Night Grand Prix midget car race in 1995. He was a three-peat winner in the event after winning in 1996 and 1997.

Boat made his first IRL start in the 1997 Indianapolis 500 driving for A. J. Foyt Enterprises. In 1998, he won six poles, including five in a row, both league records, and won his first race at Texas Motor Speedway. It was his only official IRL victory. (He appeared to have won the same race in the 1996-97 season, but a scoring error meant he finished second). He is one of the few drivers with the distinction to have started from both the pole (1998) and final 33rd (2000, 2001) starting position in the Indy 500. He has not appeared in an IRL race since the 2003 Indianapolis 500.

== Personal life ==
Boat is a graduate of Arizona State University. In 1986 he founded Billy Boat Performance Exhaust, a company that makes performance exhaust systems for luxury and high performance cars, light trucks, and high performance watercraft. Boat has four children, with three girls and one boy.

In 2014, Boat's son Chad began competing in the NASCAR Nationwide Series, driving a family-owned No. 84 Chevrolet.

== Motorsports career results ==
=== American open–wheel racing results ===
(key)

==== Indy Lights ====
Year	Team	1	2	3	4	5	6	7	8	9	10	Rank	Points
1986	Marsh Holt Racing	PHX1; 4	MIL; 11	MEA; 7	TOR	POC; 8	MDO; 5	ROA; 6	LS; 8	PHX2; 3	MIA; 8	**6th**	**67**
1987	Machinist Union Racing	PHX; 10	MIL; 13	MEA	CLE	TOR	POC	MDO	NZR	LS	MIA	**24th**	**4**

==== IndyCar Series ====
Year	Team	No.	Chassis	Engine	1	2	3	4	5	6	7	8	9	10	11	12	13	14	15	16	Rank	Points	Ref
1996	Pagan Racing	99	Reynard 94i	Ford XB V8t	WDW	PHX	INDY; DNQ														NC	-	
1996–97	A. J. Foyt Enterprises	11	Dallara IR7	Oldsmobile Aurora V8	NHM	LVS	WDW	PHX	INDY; 7					**LV2**; 23							**18th**	**151**	
1996–97	A. J. Foyt Enterprises	1	G-Force GF01	Oldsmobile Aurora V8						TXS; 2		CLT; 2	NH2; 8								**18th**	**151**	
1996–97	PDM Racing	18	Dallara IR7	Oldsmobile Aurora V8							PPIR; 19										**18th**	**151**	
1998	A. J. Foyt Enterprises	11	Dallara IR8	Oldsmobile Aurora V8	WDW; 21	PHX; 3	**INDY**; 23	TXS; 1	**NHM**; 21	DOV	CLT	**PPIR**; 9	**ATL**; 12	**TX2**; 14	**LVS**; 26						**13th**	**194**	
1999	A. J. Foyt Enterprises	11	Dallara IR9	Oldsmobile Aurora V8	WDW; 9	PHX; 4	CLT; C	INDY; 3	TXS; 24	PPIR; 24	**ATL**; 10	DOV; 4	PPI2; 13	LVS; 22	TX2; 9						**12th**	**204**	
2000	Team Pelfrey	81	Dallara IR-00	Oldsmobile Aurora V8	WDW; 9	PHX; 6	LVS; 7		TXS; 23	PPIR; 18	ATL; 8	KTY; 18	TX2; 3								**10th**	**181**	
2000	A. J. Foyt Enterprises	41	G-Force GF05	Oldsmobile Aurora V8				INDY; 15													**10th**	**181**	
2001	Curb/Agajanian-Beck Motorsports	98	Dallara IR-01	Oldsmobile Aurora V8	PHX; 5	HMS; 13	ATL; 14	INDY; 9	TXS; 5	PPIR; 4	RIR; 18	KAN; 9	NSH; 2	KTY; 6	STL; 6	CHI; 12	TX2; 12				**4th**	**313**	
2002	CURB/Agajanian/Beck Motorsports	98	Dallara IR-02	Chevrolet Indy V8	HMS; 16	PHX; 8	FON; 18	NZR; 8	INDY; 18	TXS; 7	PPIR; 14	RIR; 22									**13th**	**225**	
2002	CURB/Agajanian/Beck Motorsports	98	Dallara IR-02	Infiniti VRH35ADE V8									KAN; 9	**NSH**; 14	MIS; 14	KTY; 19	STL; 23	CHI; 19	TX2; 24		**13th**	**225**	
2003	Panther Racing	98	Dallara IR-03	Chevrolet Indy V8	HMS	PHX	MOT	INDY; 32	TXS	PPIR	RIR	KAN	NSH	MIS	STL	KTY	NZR	CHI	FON	TX2	**37th**	**1**	

==== Indianapolis 500 ====
Year	Chassis	Engine	Start	Finish	Team
1996	Reynard 94i	Ford XB V8t	DNQ		Pagan Racing
1997	Dallara IR7	Oldsmobile Aurora V8	22	7	A. J. Foyt Enterprises
1998	Dallara IR8	Oldsmobile Aurora V8	**1**	23	A. J. Foyt Enterprises
1999	Dallara IR9	Oldsmobile Aurora V8	3	3	A. J. Foyt Enterprises
2000	G-Force GF05	Oldsmobile Aurora V8	31	15	A. J. Foyt Enterprises
2001	Dallara IR-01	Oldsmobile Aurora V8	32	9	CURB/Agajanian/Beck Motorsports
2002	Dallara IR-02	Chevrolet Indy V8	23	18	Agajanian/Boat Racing
2003	Dallara IR-03	Chevrolet Indy V8	29	32	Panther Racing

=== NASCAR ===
(key) (Bold – Pole position awarded by qualifying time. Italics – Pole position earned by points standings or practice time. * – Most laps led.)

==== Busch Series ====
NASCAR Busch Series results
Year	Team	No.	Make	1	2	3	4	5	6	7	8	9	10	11	12	13	14	15	16	17	18	19	20	21	22	23	24	25	26	27	28	29	30	31	32	33	34	NBSC	Pts	Ref
2003	Braun Racing	30	Dodge	DAY	CAR	LVS	DAR	BRI	TEX	TAL	NSH	CAL	RCH	GTY	NZH	CLT	DOV	NSH	KEN	MLW	DAY	CHI	NHA	PPR	IRP	MCH	BRI	DAR	RCH	DOV	KAN	CLT	MEM	ATL	PHO; 29	CAR	HOM	135th	76	
