= Chastain Motorsports =

Team in Indy Racing League

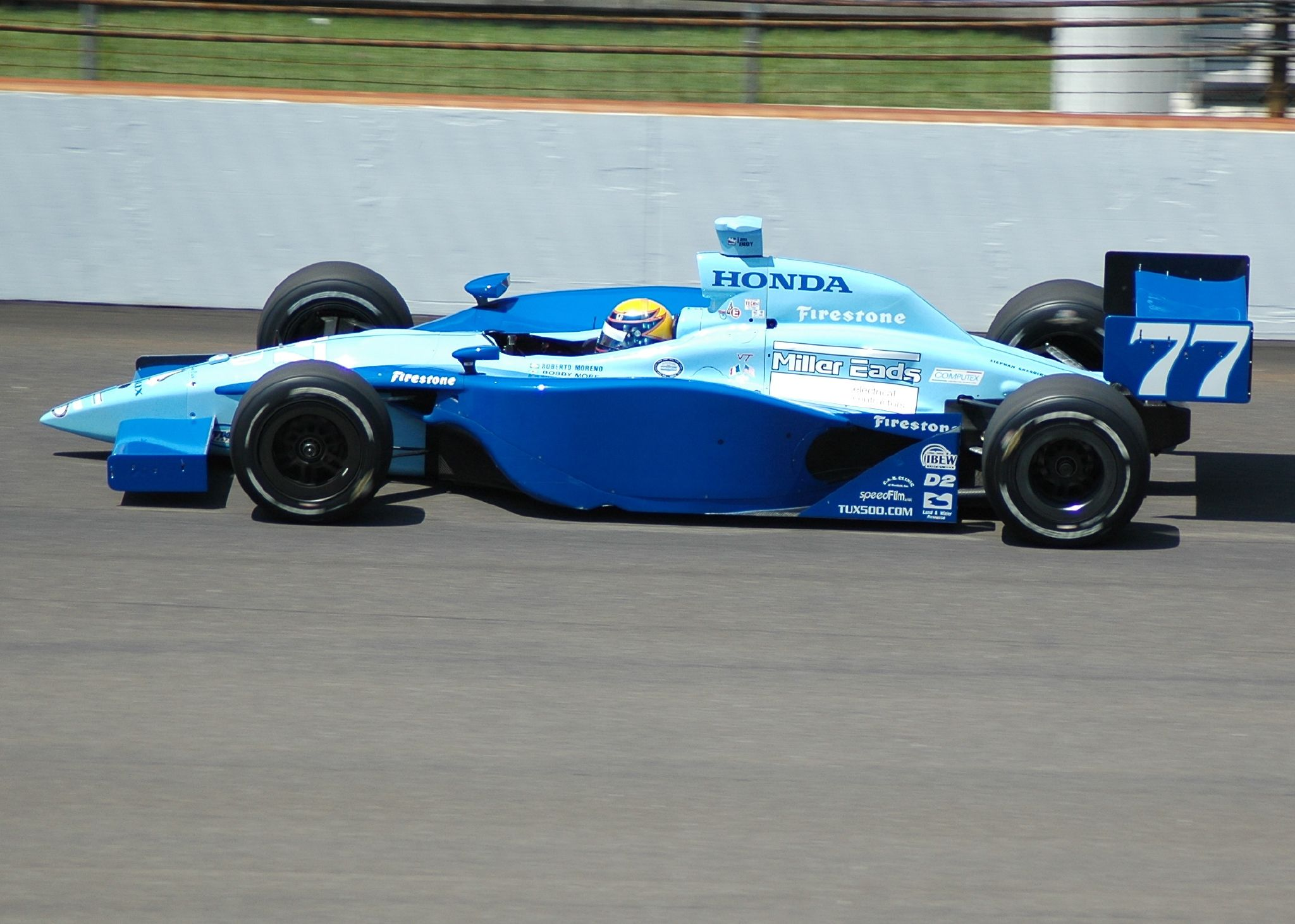
Roberto Moreno during 2007 Indianapolis 500 practice

Chastain Motorsports was a team in the Indy Racing League owned by Indianapolis businessman Tom Chastain (no relation to Ross Chastain). The team was founded in 1997 and raced until 1998 with driver Stephan Gregoire. Gregoire finished 11th in driver points in 1997 and 12th in 1998 with a best race finish of 2nd at Pikes Peak International Raceway in 1997. At the end of the 1998 season the team ceased operations.

Chastain returned to IndyCar after a 9-year absence for the 2007 Indianapolis 500, again with Gregoire driving. However, Gregoire was injured in a practice crash and Roberto Moreno was named as the replacement driver. Moreno qualified 31st with the fastest 4 lap average of any Panoz chassis but was the first to crash out and finished in 33rd and last place. The Linux community attempted to raise money to sponsor the car and gain awareness for the Linux product, however they fell short of their goals and only raised enough for minor associate sponsorship.

== Complete IRL IndyCar Series results ==
(key) (Results in bold indicate pole position; results in italics indicate fastest lap)

Year	Chassis	Engine	Drivers	No.	1	2	3	4	5	6	7	8	9	10	11	12	13	14	15	16	17	Pts Pos	Pos
1996–97					NHA	LSV	WDW	PHX	INDY	TXS	PPIR	CLT	NHA	LSV									
1996–97	G-Force GF01	Oldsmobile Aurora V8	(France) Stéphan Grégoire	77			19	5	31		2	8	15	9								11th	**192**
1998					WDW	PHX	INDY	TXS	NHA	DOV	CLT	PPIR	ATL	TXS	LSV								
1998	G-Force GF01B	Oldsmobile Aurora V8	(France) Stéphan Grégoire	77	4	4	17	25	24	5	8	4	20	26	17							12th	**201**
2007					HMS	STP	MOT	KAN	INDY	MIL	TXS	IOW	RIR	WGL	NSH	MDO	MCH	KTY	SNM	DET	CHI		
2007	Panoz GF09C	Honda HI7R V8	(France) Stéphan Grégoire	77					Wth													NC	—
2007	Panoz GF09C	Honda HI7R V8	(Brazil) Roberto Moreno	77					33													36th	**10**
