= 1998 Dura Lube 200 =

Car race

(United States) 1998 Phoenix
Race details
- 2nd round of the 1998 Indy Racing League season
- Date: March 22, 1998
- Official name: Dura Lube 200
- Location: Phoenix International Raceway
- Course: Permanent racing facility 1.000 mi / 1.609 km
- Distance: 200 laps 200.000 mi / 321.869 km

Pole position
- Driver: (United States) Jeff Ward (ISM Racing)
- Time: 20.839

Fastest lap
- Driver: (United States) Tony Stewart (Team Menard)
- Time: 21.996 (on lap 43 of 200)

Podium
- First: (United States) Scott Sharp (Kelley Racing)
- Second: (United States) Tony Stewart (Team Menard)
- Third: (United States) Billy Boat (A. J. Foyt Enterprises)

The 1998 Dura Lube 200 was the second round of the 1998 Indy Racing League. The race was held on March 22, 1998 at the 1.000 mi (1.609 km) Phoenix International Raceway in Avondale, Arizona.

== Report ==
Key	Meaning
R	Rookie
W	Past winner

=== Qualifying ===
Grid limited to 28 cars. Positions 1-26 determined by qualifying speed. Positions 27-28 reserved for provisionals (based on entrant points).

Pos	No.	Name	Lap 1	Lap 2	Best (in mph)	Entrant points
1	35	(United States) Jeff Ward	20.839	21.242	172.753	
2	11	(United States) Billy Boat	21.053	20.867	172.521	
3	1	(United States) Tony Stewart	21.058	20.869	172.505	
4	7	(United States) Jimmy Kite	20.872	20.896	172.480	
5	14	(Sweden) Kenny Bräck	21.404	21.003	171.404	
6	15	(Chile) Eliseo Salazar	21.116	21.023	171.241	
7	6	(United States) Davey Hamilton	21.198	21.083	170.754	
8	8	(United States) Scott Sharp	21.112	21.110	170.535	
9	91	(United States) Buddy Lazier	21.161	21.476	170.124	
10	44	(United States) J. J. Yeley R	21.258	21.163	170.108	
11	21	(Colombia) Roberto Guerrero W	21.225	21.176	170.004	
12	3	(United States) Robbie Buhl	21.257	21.185	169.932	
13	30	(Brazil) Raul Boesel	21.249	21.235	169.531	
14	4	(Canada) Scott Goodyear	21.267	21.340	169.276	
15	28	(United States) Mark Dismore	21.530	21.274	169.221	
16	16	(Brazil) Marco Greco	21.565	21.312	168.919	
17	12	(United States) Buzz Calkins	21.423	21.320	168.856	
18	97	(United States) Greg Ray	22.003	21.441	167.903	
19	5	(Netherlands) Arie Luyendyk W	21.656	21.520	167.286	
20	51	(United States) Eddie Cheever	21.550	21.560	167.053	
21	18	(United States) John Paul Jr.	21.626	21.624	166.482	
22	77	(France) Stéphan Grégoire	21.779	21.676	166.082	
23	22	(United States) Dave Steele R	22.190	21.809	165.069	
24	10	(United States) Mike Groff	22.185	21.838	164.850	
25	99	(United States) Sam Schmidt	22.220	21.861	164.677	
26	23	(United States) Paul Durant	21.974	21.865	164.647	
27	20	(United States) Tyce Carlson	23.244	23.660	154.879	19
28	17	(United States) Brian Tyler R	23.129	23.158	155.649	11
Didn't qualify
29	40	(United States) Jack Miller	22.398	21.880	164.534	7
30	53	(United States) Jim Guthrie W	22.418	21.898	164.399	0
31	27	(United States) Robbie Groff	21.957	22.062	163.957	2
32	19	(United States) Stan Wattles	22.364	21.997	163.659	8

=== Race ===
The difference between the fastest and slowest qualifier was the 2nd closest in Indycar history at Phoenix, which, combined with traction problems in turn 2 caused by a dip in the pavement, made for a rough race. Shockingly, neither the defending race champion, Jim Guthrie, nor his previous team Blueprint Racing (with Robbie Groff) qualified. Speeds were up from the previous year, and six cars broke the new-car track record led by surprise pole winner Jeff Ward, who jumped out to the early lead and held it until he encountered gearbox problems. He eventually lost fifth gear and was handicapped on restarts, although once up to speed he was still one of the fastest cars on the track. Eddie Cheever, from 20th starting position, moved into the top 10 by lap 11. Buddy Lazier dropped out early when he lost an engine and crashed in turn 3. On lap 19, John Paul Jr. started a long sequence of incidents in turn 2 when he spun there.

After Ward's transmission malfunctioned, Tony Stewart took over the lead for almost 100 more laps. In between, Kenny Bräck, Billy Boat and Ward battled for position while Sharp moved up through the field. On lap 32, Sharp's teammate Mark Dismore wrecked in turn 2, and lost some laps before returning to the race, something that would be significant for the outcome of the race. Rookie J. J. Yeley surprised qualifying 10th in his first IRL start, but he spun in turn 2 on lap 46. Davey Hamilton tried to squeeze by on the outside but slid into the wall and then into Yeley. Another first-timer, Dave Steele, was involved in a frightening accident at the same spot on lap 59. Eliseo Salazar spun and collected Steele and Robbie Buhl. Trying to avoid him, Arie Luyendyk touched wheels with Salazar. Luyendyk's car went up and over, and slid through turn 2 upside down. The Dutch had significant damage to his helmet from the pavement but only had a hand burn caused by scraping the asphalt during the spin.

Cheever had moved into the lead prior to this yellow, but lost a lap when his crew got the left and right rear tires reversed on a pit stop, and he never managed to make up the lap. Then, Stéphan Grégoire moved into second place behind Stewart. Buzz Calkins was picking up his lap times, and after a caution for Paul Durant's blown engine on lap 106, he made up a lap and joined the lead pack, but he got hit by debris when Paul Jr. wrecked on lap 133 and had to put for a new nose, losing again a lap. At this point, Stewart still led, with Bräck pursuing him but being unable to catch the leader. Pit strategy came into play on lap 169 when Sam Schmidt spun in turn 2. All cars on the lead lap cars pitted with the exception of Sharp, who decided to gamble on fuel.

After the green flag on lap 174, Sharp quickly opened up a 3-second lead in traffic but then had to slow to conserve fuel. On lap 186, Bräck got caught in a four wide pass in the back stretch dogleg and he touched wheels with Mike Groff. Both crashed hard and Groff had to be cut out of his car. Groff was taken to the hospital, examined, and released. The resulting long caution allowed Sharp to conserve fuel. The green waved with 2 laps to go. Between the leaders was Dismore, many laps down but running fast. Dismore bogged down at the start and held up Stewart and Boat. The race would end in that order: despite the controversy that erupted following the race, Dismore claimed to not have received any "team orders", but he was fined $5,000 for "unsportsmanlike conduct". Sharp was also fined $15,000 and docked 7 points for "failing to meet the fuel tank capacity requirement", as his car held more fuel than allowed. Grégoire's unsponsored car logged its second consecutive fourth-place finish, and Ward finished fifth. Schmidt, with an underfunded team, managed his best finish ever in the IRL with a 7th place despite two spins. Scott Sharp got his second IRL victory; his first in the new cars.

Pos	No.	Driver	Team	Laps	Time/Retired	Grid	Laps Led	Points
1	8	(United States) Scott Sharp	Kelley Racing	200	2:02:18.735	8	30	43
2	1	(United States) Tony Stewart	Team Menard	200	+ 2.366 sec	3	127	43
3	11	(United States) Billy Boat	A. J. Foyt Enterprises	200	+ 3.280 sec	2	12	37
4	77	(France) Stéphan Grégoire	Chastain Motorsports	199	+ 1 lap	22	0	32
5	35	(United States) Jeff Ward	ISM Racing	199	+ 1 lap	1	25	33
6	4	(Canada) Scott Goodyear	Panther Racing	199	+ 1 lap	14	0	28
7	99	(United States) Sam Schmidt	LP Racing	198	+ 2 laps	25	0	26
8	30	(Brazil) Raul Boesel	McCormack Motorsports	197	+ 3 laps	13	0	24
9	12	(United States) Buzz Calkins	Bradley Motorsports	197	+ 3 laps	17	0	22
10	51	(United States) Eddie Cheever	Team Cheever	196	+ 4 laps	20	6	20
11	97	(United States) Greg Ray	Knapp Motorsports	192	+ 8 laps	18	0	19
12	3	(United States) Robbie Buhl	Team Menard	187	+ 13 laps	12	0	18
13	20	(United States) Tyce Carlson	Immke Racing	186	+ 14 laps	27	0	17
14	14	(Sweden) Kenny Bräck	A. J. Foyt Enterprises	185	Accident	5	0	16
15	10	(United States) Mike Groff	Byrd-Cunningham Racing	177	Accident	24	0	15
16	28	(United States) Mark Dismore	Kelley Racing	175	+ 25 laps	15	0	14
17	17	(United States) Brian Tyler R	Treadway Racing	168	+ 32 laps	28	0	13
18	7	(United States) Jimmy Kite	Team Scandia	129	+ 71 laps	4	0	12
19	18	(United States) John Paul Jr.	PDM Racing	126	Accident	21	0	11
20	16	(Brazil) Marco Greco	Phoenix Racing	122	+ 78 laps	16	0	10
21	23	(United States) Paul Durant	CBR Cobb Racing	99	Engine	26	0	9
22	22	(United States) Dave Steele R	RSM Marko	59	Engine	23	0	8
23	15	(Chile) Eliseo Salazar	Riley & Scott Cars	58	Accident	6	0	7
24	5	(Netherlands) Arie Luyendyk W	Treadway Racing	58	Accident	19	0	6
25	44	(United States) J. J. Yeley R	Sinden Racing Services	45	Accident	10	0	5
26	6	(United States) Davey Hamilton	Nienhouse Motorsports	45	Accident	7	0	4
27	21	(Colombia) Roberto Guerrero W	Pagan Racing	44	Transmission	11	0	3
28	91	(United States) Buddy Lazier	Hemelgarn Racing	9	Accident	9	0	2

== Race Statistics ==
- Lead changes: 6 among 5 drivers

Lap Leaders
Laps	Leader
1–25	Jeff Ward
26–48	Tony Stewart
49–54	Billy Boat
55–60	Eddie Cheever
61–66	Billy Boat
67–170	Tony Stewart
171–200	Scott Sharp

Cautions: 10 for 80 laps
Laps	Reason
10–17	Buddy Lazier crash
19–22	John Paul Jr. stopped on track
32–37	Mark Dismore crash
46–55	Davey Hamilton and J. J. Yeley crash
59–69	Luyendyk, Steele, Salazar and Schmidt crash
105–114	Paul Durant's engine leaks oil on track
118–121	Debris
132–140	John Paul Jr. crash
168–173	Sam Schmidt spin
186–197	Kenny Bräck and Mike Groff crash

== Standings after the race ==
Drivers' Championship standings

Pos	Driver	Points
1	(United States) Tony Stewart	95
2	(United States) Jeff Ward	73
3	(United States) Scott Sharp	71
4	(France) Stéphan Grégoire	64
5	(United States) Sam Schmidt	48

- Note: Only the top five positions are included for the standings.
