= PDM Racing =

Racing team

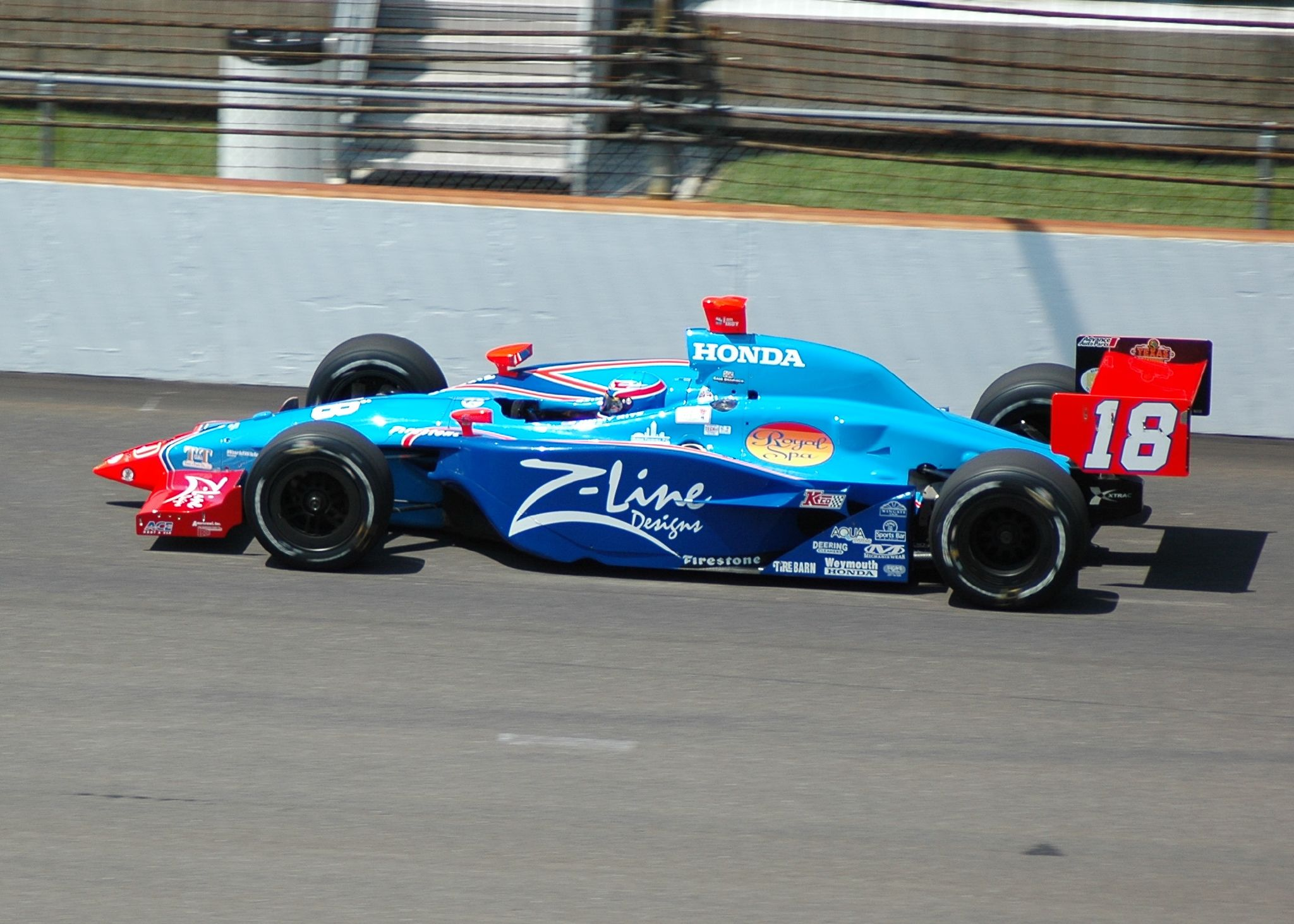
PDM driver Jimmy Kite practicing for the 2007 Indianapolis 500

PDM Racing was a racing team in the IndyCar Series and USAC Silver Crown series owned by Paul Diatlovich. Almost always a low budget team and affectionately dubbed "Poor Dumb Mechanics" by Diatlovich, it was known to make the most out of mediocre equipment. The team was founded in 1996 with the inception of the Indy Racing League and ran full seasons until 2002 when rising costs forced the team to scale back to a part-time venture. The team is most known for bringing three-time champion Sam Hornish Jr. into the league in 2000. Hornish earned the team's best finish that season, a 3rd at Las Vegas Motor Speedway.

The team fielded a USAC Silver Crown team with its car driven by Thiago Medeiros whom they also fielded a car for in the 2006 Indianapolis 500. The team entered the 2007 Indianapolis 500 with driver Jimmy Kite returning to the team, but they were unable to come within 3 mph (4.8 km/h) of the speed necessary to make the field and failed to qualify. During the 2008 season the team partnered with American Spirit Racing to field Cyndie Allemann in the Firestone Indy Lights Series providing technical support and a base of operations. PDM Racing entered the Indy 500 but did not make an appearance. PDM Racing continued working with ASR to field the Indy Lights car driven by Junior Strous until the Freedom 100 when the program folded. The team has returned to Indy Lights in 2010 under its own banner with driver Rodrigo Barbosa.

== Drivers that have driven for PDM ==
=== IRL IndyCar Series ===
- (United States) Billy Boat (1997)
- (United States) Mike Borkowski (1999)
- (United States) Tyce Carlson (1997–1998, 2002)
- (United States) Ed Carpenter (2003)
- (Australia) John de Vries (2002)
- (United States) Jack Hewitt (1998)
- (United States) Sam Hornish Jr. (2000)
- (United States) Jimmy Kite (2003)
- (United States) Steve Knapp (1998–1999)
- (United States) Cory Kruseman (2002)
- (United States) Scott Mayer (2003)
- (United States) Robby McGehee (2004)
- (Brazil) Thiago Medeiros (2006)
- (United States) John Paul Jr. (1996–1998)
- (United States) Jeret Schroeder (2001–2002)

=== Indy Lights ===
- (Switzerland) Cyndie Allemann (2008)
- (Brazil) Rodrigo Barbosa (2010)
- (Netherlands) Junior Strous (2009)

== Complete IRL IndyCar Series results ==
(key) (Results in bold indicate pole position; results in italics indicate fastest lap)

Year	Chassis	Engine	Tyres	Drivers	No.	1	2	3	4	5	6	7	8	9	10	11	12	13	14	15	16	17
1996						WDW	PHX	INDY														
1996	Lola T93/00	Menard V6t	G	(United States) John Paul Jr.	18	9	14	31														
1996–97						NHA	LSV	WDW	PHX	INDY	TXS	PPIR	CLT	NHA	LSV							
1996–97	Lola T93/00	Menard V6t	G	(United States) John Paul Jr.	18	10	15															
1996–97	G-Force GF01	Oldsmobile Aurora V8	G	(United States) John Paul Jr.	18										12							
1996–97	Dallara IR7	Oldsmobile Aurora V8	G	(United States) John Paul Jr.	18			18	9	Wth			11	7								
1996–97	Dallara IR7	Oldsmobile Aurora V8	G	(United States) Billy Boat	18							19										
1996–97	Dallara IR7	Oldsmobile Aurora V8	G	(United States) Tyce Carlson **(R)**	18					19	14											
1996–97	Lola T93/00	Menard V6t	G	(United States) Tyce Carlson **(R)**	28	11	23															
1998						WDW	PHX	INDY	TXS	NHA	DOV	CLT	PPIR	ATL	TXS	LSV						
1998	G-Force GF01B	Oldsmobile Aurora V8	G	(United States) John Paul Jr.	18	10	19															
1998	G-Force GF01B	Oldsmobile Aurora V8	G	(United States) Jack Hewitt **(R)**	18			12	DNP	25												
1998	G-Force GF01B	Oldsmobile Aurora V8	G	(United States) Steve Knapp **(R)**	18						13		14	14	18	9						
1998	G-Force GF01B	Oldsmobile Aurora V8	G	(United States) Tyce Carlson	18							11										
1999						WDW	PHX	CLT	INDY	TXS	PPIR	ATL	DOV	PPIR	LSV	TXS						
1999	G-Force GF01C	Oldsmobile Aurora V8	G	(United States) Steve Knapp	18	7																
1999	G-Force GF01C	Oldsmobile Aurora V8	G	(United States) Mike Borkowski **(R)**	18			C^{1}	DNQ													
2000						WDW	PHX	LSV	INDY	TXS	PPIR	ATL	KTY	TXS								
2000	Dallara IR-00	Oldsmobile Aurora V8	F	(United States) Sam Hornish Jr. **(R)**	18	20	17	3	24	20	19		9	27								
2001						PHX	HMS	ATL	INDY	TXS	PPIR	RIR	KAN	NSH	KTY	GAT	CHI	TXS				
2001	G-Force GF05B	Oldsmobile Aurora V8	F	(United States) Jeret Schroeder	18	26	14	19	20				15									
2001	G-Force GF05B	Oldsmobile Aurora V8	F	(United States) Jon Herb **(R)**	18												15	9				
2002						HMS	PHX	FON	NAZ	INDY	TXS	PPIR	RIR	KAN	NSH	MCH	KTY	GAT	CHI	TXS		
2002	Dallara IR-02	Chevrolet Indy V8	F	(United States) Tyce Carlson	18	11	DNS															
2002	Dallara IR-02	Chevrolet Indy V8	F	(United States) Jeret Schroeder	18			27														
2002	Dallara IR-02	Chevrolet Indy V8	F	(Australia) John de Vries **(R)**	18						11											
2002	Dallara IR-02	Chevrolet Indy V8	F	(United States) Cory Kruseman **(R)**	18															26		
2003						HMS	PHX	MOT	INDY	TXS	PPIR	RIR	KAN	NSH	MCH	GAT	KTY	NAZ	CHI	FON	TXS	
2003	Dallara IR-03	Chevrolet Indy V8	F	(United States) Scott Mayer	18	21	19	24														
2003	Dallara IR-03	Chevrolet Indy V8	F	(United States) Jimmy Kite	18				13													
2003	Dallara IR-03	Chevrolet Indy V8	F	(United States) Ed Carpenter	18														13	13	21	
2004						HMS	PHX	MOT	INDY	TXS	RIR	KAN	NSH	MIL	MCH	KTY	PPIR	NAZ	CHI	FON	TXS	
2004	Dallara IR-04	Chevrolet Indy V8	F	(United States) Robby McGehee	18				22													
2006						HMS	STP	MOT	INDY	WGL	TXS	RIR	KAN	NSH	MIL	MCH	KTY	SNM	CHI			
2006	Panoz GF09C	Honda HI6R V8	F	(Brazil) Thiago Medeiros **(R)**	18				31													
2007						HMS	STP	MOT	KAN	INDY	MIL	TXS	IOW	RIR	WGL	NSH	MDO	MCH	KTY	SNM	DET	CHI
2007	Panoz GF09C	Honda HI7R V8	F	(United States) Jimmy Kite	18					DNQ												

1. The 1999 VisionAire 500K at Charlotte was cancelled after 79 laps due to spectator fatalities.
