= Team Scandia =

Defunct Indy Racing league team

Team Scandia was a short-lived American auto racing team that competed in the Indy Racing League between 1996 and 1999, also entering the 1998 NASCAR Cup and the 24 Hours of Daytona on three occasions.

The team traces its origin to when Andy Evans bought much of Dick Simon Racing from Dick Simon during the 1996 IRL season. As such, Simon was listed as the owners of some of Scandia's cars in the 1996 Indianapolis 500; in which the team fielded a record seven cars. The team tried to achieve a similar feat with five cars in the 1997 Indy 500, but with higher expenses brought by new chassis, the venture was less successful. Later that season, the team captured its only IRL victory with a car driven by Eliseo Salazar at Las Vegas Motor Speedway. The team shut down in 1999 due to lack of sponsorship after scaling back heavily from 1998 onwards.

== Team Scandia drivers ==
- (Italy) Michele Alboreto (1996–1997)
- (United States) Racin Gardner (1996)
- (Brazil) Affonso Giaffone (1997)
- (Brazil) Marco Greco (1997)
- (France) Stephan Gregoire (1997)
- (United States) Joe Gosek (1996)
- (United States) Jim Guthrie (1999)
- (Mexico) Michel Jourdain Jr. (1996–1997)
- (United States) Jimmy Kite (1997–1998)
- (United States) Billy Roe (1998)
- (Chile) Eliseo Salazar (1996–1997)
- (Italy) Vincenzo Sospiri (1997)
- (United States) Lyn St. James (1996)
- (Spain) Fermín Vélez (1996–1997)
- (Italy) Alessandro Zampedri (1996–1997)

== IRL Race Results ==
(key) (Results in bold indicate pole position; results in italics indicate fastest lap)

Year	Chassis	Engine	Drivers	No.	1	2	3	4	5	6	7	8	9	10	11
1996					WDW	PHX	INDY								
1996	Lola T95; Lola T94 (Note: Used by Alessandro Zampedri, Joe Gosek and Racin Gardner.); Lola T93 (Note: Used by Lyn St. James at Walt Disney World); Reynard 95I (Note: Used by Michele Alboreto at Walt Disney World and Lyn St. James at Phoenix.)	Ford Cosworth	(Chile) Eliseo Salazar	7	Wth		6								
1996	Lola T95; Lola T94; Lola T93; Reynard 95I	Ford Cosworth	(Spain) Fermín Vélez	7		19									
1996	Lola T95; Lola T94; Lola T93; Reynard 95I	Ford Cosworth	(Spain) Fermín Vélez	34			21								
1996	Lola T95; Lola T94; Lola T93; Reynard 95I	Ford Cosworth	(Italy) Alessandro Zampedri	8			4								
1996	Lola T95; Lola T94; Lola T93; Reynard 95I	Ford Cosworth	(Mexico) Michel Jourdain Jr.	22		20	13								
1996	Lola T95; Lola T94; Lola T93; Reynard 95I	Ford Cosworth	(Italy) Michele Alboreto	33	4	8	30								
1996	Lola T95; Lola T94; Lola T93; Reynard 95I	Ford Cosworth	(United States) Joe Gosek (Note: Switched from Tempero-Giuffre Racing (car #15) during practice for the Indy 500.)	43			22								
1996	Lola T95; Lola T94; Lola T93; Reynard 95I	Ford Cosworth	(United States) Lyn St. James	90	8	21									
1996	Lola T95; Lola T94; Lola T93; Reynard 95I	Ford Cosworth	(United States) Racin Gardner	90			25								
1996–97					NHA	LSV	WDW	PHX	INDY	TXS	PPIR	CLT	NHA	LSV	
1996–97	Lola T95 (Note: Used in the 1996 races.); Reynard 95I (Note: Used by Michele Alboreto.); Lola T94 (Note: Used by Affonso Giaffone.); Dallara IR7	Ford Cosworth; Oldsmobile	(Chile) Eliseo Salazar	7	9	7	Wth		24	7	12	10	4	1*	
1996–97	Lola T95; Reynard 95I; Lola T94; Dallara IR7	Ford Cosworth; Oldsmobile	(France) Stéphan Grégoire	8		26									
1996–97	Lola T95; Reynard 95I; Lola T94; Dallara IR7	Ford Cosworth; Oldsmobile	(France) Stéphan Grégoire	22	8										
1996–97	Lola T95; Reynard 95I; Lola T94; Dallara IR7	Ford Cosworth; Oldsmobile	(Italy) Vincenzo Sospiri **(R)**	8					17	9					
1996–97	Lola T95; Reynard 95I; Lola T94; Dallara IR7	Ford Cosworth; Oldsmobile	(Italy) Vincenzo Sospiri **(R)**	22							6	20	2	22	
1996–97	Lola T95; Reynard 95I; Lola T94; Dallara IR7	Ford Cosworth; Oldsmobile	(Mexico) Michel Jourdain Jr.	22		2									
1996–97	Lola T95; Reynard 95I; Lola T94; Dallara IR7	Ford Cosworth; Oldsmobile	(Brazil) Marco Greco	22			8	4	16	26					
1996–97	Lola T95; Reynard 95I; Lola T94; Dallara IR7	Ford Cosworth; Oldsmobile	(Italy) Michele Alboreto	33	3	5									
1996–97	Lola T95; Reynard 95I; Lola T94; Dallara IR7	Ford Cosworth; Oldsmobile	(Spain) Fermín Vélez **(R)**	33			9	14	10	25					
1996–97	Lola T95; Reynard 95I; Lola T94; Dallara IR7	Ford Cosworth; Oldsmobile	(United States) Jimmy Kite **(R)**	33							20	15	23	6	
1996–97	Lola T95; Reynard 95I; Lola T94; Dallara IR7	Ford Cosworth; Oldsmobile	(Brazil) Affonso Giaffone **(R)**	34		10									
1996–97	Lola T95; Reynard 95I; Lola T94; Dallara IR7	Ford Cosworth; Oldsmobile	(Italy) Alessandro Zampedri	34					35	12					
1998					WDW	PHX	INDY	TXS	NHA	DOV	CLT	PPIR	ATL	TXS	LSV
1998	Dallara IR8	Oldsmobile Aurora V8	(United States) Jimmy Kite	7	16	18	11				23				
1998	Dallara IR8	Oldsmobile Aurora V8	(United States) Joe Gosek	29			DNQ								
1998	Dallara IR8	Oldsmobile Aurora V8	(United States) Billy Roe	33			30								
1999					WDW	PHX	INDY	TXS	PPIR	ATL	DOV	PPIR	LSV	TXS	
1999	G-Force GF01C	Oldsmobile Aurora V8	(United States) Jim Guthrie (Note: In conjunction with Coulson Racing.)	34			DNQ								

=== IndyCar win ===
#	Season	Date	Sanction	Track / Race	No.	Winning driver	Chassis	Engine	Tire	Grid	Laps Led
1	1996-97	October 11	IRL	Las Vegas Motor Speedway **(O)**	**7**	(Chile) Eliseo Salazar	Dallara IR7	Oldsmobile Aurora V8	Goodyear	5	70
