= Stéphan Grégoire =

French racing driver

- Nationality: France
- Born: May 14, 1969 (age 57) Neufchâteau, Vosges

Indy Racing League IndyCar Series
- Years active: 1996–2001, 2006–2007
- Teams: Hemelgarn Racing; Team Scandia; Chastain Motorsports; Dick Simon Racing; CURB/Agajanian/Beck/Team Leader Motorsports
- Starts: 45
- Wins: 0
- Poles: 0
- Best finish: 11th in 1996–1997

Previous series
- 2005, 2007 1993–1994 1993 1990–1992: Rolex Grand-Am; CART; British Formula Two; French Formula Three Championship

24 Hours of Le Mans career
- Years: 2003, 2008 – 2010
- Teams: Courage Compétition, Rollcentre Racing, Luc Alphand Aventures
- Best finish: 7th (2003)
- Class wins: 0

Stéphan Grégoire (born May 14, 1969 in Neufchâteau, Vosges) is a French race car driver currently living in Zionsville, Indiana.

Grégoire is a veteran of the 24 Hours of Le Mans, Rolex Sports Car Series, the Indianapolis 500, and the Indy Racing League. He made 44 IRL starts between 1996 and 2001 with a best finish of second at Pikes Peak International Raceway in 1997. In that season, he also recorded his best ever points finish of eleventh. In his six Indy 500 starts, he has a best finish of eighth in 2000. Gregoire was in an accident late in the 2000 season at the Texas Motor Speedway during a test run which caused him to have bruises to his left knee and ankle. He returned to the IRL and the "500" for the 2006 race in a car fielded by Team Leader Motorsports and finished 29th.

Grégoire was set to return to the Indy 500 in 2007 for Chastain Motorsports, the team he drove for in 1997 and 1998. A crash in practice on May 17, ended his chances.

== Racing record ==
=== American open–wheel ===
(key)

==== CART ====
Year	Team	1	2	3	4	5	6	7	8	9	10	11	12	13	14	15	16	Rank	Points	Ref
1993	Formula Project	SRF	PHX	LBH	INDY; 19	MIL	DET	POR	CLE	TOR	MIS	NHM	ROA	{VAN	MDO	NZR	LS	46th	0	
1994	McCormack	SRF	PHX	LBH	INDY; DNQ	MIL	DET	POR	CLE	TOR	MIS	MDO	NHM	VAN	ROA	NZR	LS	NC	-	

==== IRL ====
Year	Team	1	2	3	4	5	6	7	8	9	10	11	12	13	14	15	16	17	Rank	Points	Ref
1996	Hemelgarn Racing	WDW; 16	PHX; 7	INDY; 27															13th	165	
1996–97	Team Scandia	NHM; 8	LVS; 26																11th	192	
1996–97	Chastain Motorsports			WDW; 19	PHX; 5	INDY; 31	TXS; Wth	PPIR; 2	CLT; 8	NH2; 15	LV2; 9								11th	192	
1998	Chastain Motorsports	WDW; 4	PHX; 4	INDY; 17	TXS; 25	NHM; 24	DOV; 5	CLT; 8	PPIR; 4	ATL; 20	TX2; 26	LVS; 17							12th	201	
1999	Dick Simon Racing	WDW; 16	PHX; 10	CLT; C	INDY; DNQ	TXS; 4	PPIR; 11	ATL; 24	DOV; 14	PPI2; 14	LVS; 8	TX2; 15							15th	162	
2000	Dick Simon Racing	WDW; 18	PHX; 8	LVS; 28	INDY; 8	TXS; 11	PPIR; 8	ATL; 7	KTY; 5	TX2; 20									14th	171	
2001	Dick Simon Racing	PHX; 21	HMS; 22	ATL; 15															35th	34	
2001	Heritage Motorsports				INDY; 28	TXS	PPIR	RIR	KAN	NSH	KTY	STL	CHI	TX2					35th	34	
2006	Team Leader Motorsports	HMS	STP	MOT	INDY; 29	WGL	TXS	RIR	KAN	NSH	MIL	MIS	KTY	SNM	CHI				37th	10	
2007	Chastain Motorsports	HMS	STP	MOT	KAN	INDY; Wth	MIL	TXS	IOW	RIR	WGL	NSH	MDO	MIS	KTY	SNM	DET	CHI	NC	0	

==== Indy 500 results ====
Year	Chassis	Engine	Start	Finish
1993	Lola	Chevrolet	15th	19th
1994	Lola	Chevrolet	Failed to Qualify	
1996	Reynard	Ford-Cosworth	13th	27th
1997	G-Force	Oldsmobile	13th	31st
1998	G-Force	Oldsmobile	31st	17th
1999	G-Force	Oldsmobile	Failed to Qualify	
2000	G-Force	Oldsmobile	20th	8th
2001	G-Force	Oldsmobile	29th	28th
2006	Panoz	Honda	30th	29th
2007	Panoz	Honda	Injury	

=== 24 Hours of Le Mans results ===
Year	Team	Co-Drivers	Car	Class	Laps	Pos.	Class Pos.
2003	(France) Courage Compétition	(France) Jonathan Cochet (France) Jean-Marc Gounon	Courage C60-Judd	LMP900	360	7th	5th
2008	(United Kingdom) Rollcentre Racing	(Portugal) João Barbosa (Belgium) Vanina Ickx	Pescarolo 01-Judd	LMP1	352	11th	10th
2009	(France) Luc Alphand Aventures	(France) Luc Alphand (France) Patrice Goueslard	Chevrolet Corvette C6.R	GT1	99	DNF	DNF
2010	(France) Luc Alphand Aventures	(France) Jérôme Policand (Netherlands) David Hart	Chevrolet Corvette C6.R	GT1	327	15th	2nd
