= 1997 Phoenix 200 =

Car race

(United States) 1997 Phoenix
Race details
- 4th round of the 1996–1997 Indy Racing League season
- Date: March 23, 1997
- Official name: Phoenix 200
- Location: Phoenix International Raceway
- Course: Permanent racing facility 1.000 mi / 1.609 km
- Distance: 200 laps 200.000 mi / 321.869 km
- Weather: Dry with temperatures reaching up to 89.6 °F (32.0 °C); wind speeds reaching up to 15.9 miles per hour (25.6 km/h)

Pole position
- Driver: (United States) Tony Stewart (Team Menard)
- Time: 21.175

Fastest lap
- Driver: (United States) Tony Stewart (Team Menard)
- Time: 22.135 (on lap 11 of 200)

Podium
- First: (United States) Jim Guthrie (Blueprint Racing)
- Second: (United States) Tony Stewart (Team Menard)
- Third: (United States) Davey Hamilton (A. J. Foyt Enterprises)

The 1997 Phoenix 200 was the fourth round of the 1996–1997 Indy Racing League. The race was held on March 23, 1997, at the 1.000 mi (1.609 km) Phoenix International Raceway in Avondale, Arizona, and was won by the unheralded Jim Guthrie, who beat IRL stalwart Tony Stewart after leading 74 laps. Guthrie's win, with no sponsorship, a huge monetary debt and a second mortgage on his house, went down as one of the biggest upsets in the history of Indy car racing.

== Pre-race news ==
Shortly after the race at Walt Disney World Speedway, the significant injuries sustained by both Davy Jones and Eliseo Salazar in rear-first crashes raised some safety concerns. As a result, the Indy Racing League mandated a seven-pound attenuator fixed behind the gearbox, to act as a 'crash-box' and help dissipate the energy in that area.

On February 4–7, the week after the Copper World Classic, Goodyear held a tire test at Phoenix with 5 drivers. Galles Racing took part with 1996 Formula 3000 runner-up Kenny Bräck, who was being evaluated as a long-term replacement for the injured Jones after fielding newcomer Jeff Ward at Orlando. Bräck had only run once on an oval, during his Barber Saab Pro Series title run at New Hampshire back in 1993. After posting the fastest time of the week at 165.975 mph, the 30-year old Swede was signed for the rest of the season a few days later.

On February 18, Texas Motor Speedway held its first ever IRL test with Tony Stewart and Buddy Lazier, although the three-day program devised by Firestone was cut in half because of windy conditions and the threat of rain.

From February 24–28, 24 drivers took part in the 'Test in the West' at Phoenix, with the absence of Beck Motorsports, which still had no engines available, and Chitwood Motorsports. Scott Sharp and Tony Stewart shared the lead over the five days, being the only drivers to break the 170 mph mark. Sharp had the fastest lap at 170.777 mph with a brand-new G-Force chassis bought by A. J. Foyt Enterprises to evaluate its performance against the Dallara. His teammate Davey Hamilton finished third overall, a distant 3.5 mph behind, but just ahead of the surprising Jim Guthrie, while early favourite Arie Luyendyk and championship leader Mike Groff lagged behind.

A faulty bearing application on the scarce contingent of Infiniti engines cause Buddy Lazier, Groff and Jack Miller to have engine issues throughout the week. Sam Schmidt, who had finished fourth in U.S. F2000 in 1996, passed his rookie test and was approved to race the second Blueprint Racing car. Schmidt's planned debut at Orlando had been postponed due to the lack of testing caused by engine shortages. Team Menard had unofficially parted ways with Mark Dismore, and evaluated Billy Boat and Dave Blaney as contenders for their second seat. Both finished in the overall top 10, Boat being slightly faster, but neither got the drive in the end. Darrin Miller and Pat Abold both passed their rookie tests in the PDM Racing mule car.

The entry list for the Phoenix 200 was unveiled on March 5 with 23 entries, including Danny Ongais and Robbie Buhl. EuroInternational, with the legendary George Bignotti as chief mechanic, also filed an entry for Phoenix resident Billy Roe, who had attempted to race the previous year. A day later, Team Menard confirmed Robbie Buhl as their second driver, leaving Beck Motorsports without a driver.

Tire testing was conducted on the Indianapolis Motor Speedway the following week. Fermín Vélez drove for Goodyear, while Tony Stewart, who topped out at 216.080 mph, and John Paul Jr. tested for Firestone. During this period, Stan Wattles confirmed that Metro Racing Systems would become the second team to take on the Riley & Scott chassis, with a delivery date expected for July. On March 19, Team SABCO had a 300-mile test at Indianapolis with Robby Gordon, who was due to attempt the Double Duty in May.

== Practice & qualifying report ==
On race week, Chitwood Motorsports replaced Danny Ongais with Affonso Giaffone, originally a one-race deal with the support of General Motors do Brasil. As in Orlando, Tony Stewart swept both practice sessions during the first day with a 165.983 mph lap in the morning, and a 164.865 mph lap in the afternoon. Jim Guthrie doubled down on his testing results and emerged as Stewart's main contender, placing second in the morning session and third in the afternoon session behind Arie Luyendyk.

Spaniard Fermín Vélez also surprised during first practice by posting the third fastest time, just before blowing an engine. Marco Greco and Scott Sharp had engine problems in the morning too, while Roberto Guerrero and Giaffone crashed in the afternoon. Guerrero's crash was triggered by another engine failure, which brought concerns on the Oldsmobile camp regarding a potential oil link issue in their engines. Despite also entering a couple of Dallaras, Foyt decided to run the G-Force chassis for both of its drivers.

On Saturday, Stewart led the last practice session with a 167.973 mph lap, just ahead of Guthrie by 0.021 seconds and Luyendyk. He later asserted his dominance in qualifying, putting his car on pole with a 170.012 mph lap. Guthrie was the last driver scheduled to qualify and, despite running the fastest first lap, he came up short at 169.484 mph, comfortably qualifying in a career-best second place as the only driver within 4 mph of Stewart's mark. Treadway Racing swept the second row with Scott Goodyear and Luyendyk, in front of Buzz Calkins and Robbie Buhl, the early leaders before Stewart's run.

Blueprint Racing was co-owned by Guthrie, who had no sponsorship on his mustard yellow Dallara. The car had been bought after Guthrie took out a loan against his house for a second time, owing $185,000 to his creditors. With minimal resources, the team arrived at the track with a rental flatbed trailer and a race crew composed of volunteers. As Blueprint could not afford a spare engine, their lone Oldsmobile engine had been rebuilt three times, with 640 miles run until that point. Because of this, Guthrie likened their efforts with "the David and Goliath story". Although the new IRL cars were 15 mph off 1996's speeds, Guthrie qualified 6 mph faster than his own time in 1996, which was only good enough for 18th place in that grid.

In his first IRL qualifying session, Sam Schmidt put his car in a solid seventh place, while Kenny Bräck and Billy Roe qualified in 10th and 18th place, respectively. Roberto Guerrero was the fastest Infiniti qualifier in 11th place after getting his car fixed in time, unlike Affonso Giaffone, who was not able to qualify. On a similar note, Scott Sharp was in second place during the morning practice when his engine caught fire, and a spare was not ready in time for qualifying. Both were allowed to start the race at the back of the field. Coincidentally, Marco Greco was able to qualify thanks to an engine previously loaned by A. J. Foyt Enterprises, achieving his first top-10 qualifying result.

Sharp's teammate, Davey Hamilton, did not come to grips with his new chassis and could only qualify in 15th place behind Buddy Lazier, while championship leader Mike Groff was mired in 17th place. John Paul Jr. qualified 12th despite waving off his first lap for a suspected timing chain failure, and Stéphan Grégoire qualified last after losing a gear. During afternoon's final practice, Buzz Calkins had an oil leak, crashed in Turn 4 and had to use a back-up car for the race, forfeiting his 5th place on the grid. For the first time in series' history, every driver that took part in the practice sessions was able to start the race.

=== Qualifying Results ===
Key	Meaning
R	Rookie
W	Past winner

Pos	No.	Name	Lap 1	Lap 2	Best (in mph)
1	2	(United States) Tony Stewart	21.424	21.175	170.012
2	27	(United States) Jim Guthrie R	21.364	21.241	169.484
3	6	(Canada) Scott Goodyear	21.975	21.681	166.044
4	5	(Netherlands) Arie Luyendyk W	21.736	21.715	165.784
5	3	(United States) Robbie Buhl	21.956	22.257	163.964
6	16	(United States) Sam Schmidt R	22.141	21.973	163.837
7	51	(United States) Eddie Cheever	22.059	22.017	163.510
8	22	(Brazil) Marco Greco	22.064	22.019	163.495
9	4	(Sweden) Kenny Bräck R	22.051	22.027	163.436
10	21	(Colombia) Roberto Guerrero W	22.129	22.075	163.080
11	18	(United States) John Paul Jr.	Waved off	22.100	162.896
12	30	(United States) Jeret Schroeder R	22.136	22.166	162.631
13	91	(United States) Buddy Lazier	22.148	22.202	162.543
14	14	(United States) Davey Hamilton	22.161	22.209	162.448
15	33	(Spain) Fermín Vélez R	22.235	22.477	161.907
16	10	(United States) Mike Groff	22.593	22.520	159.858
17	50	(United States) Billy Roe R	22.916	22.650	158.940
18	40	(United States) Jack Miller R	22.933	22.779	158.040
19	77	(France) Stéphan Grégoire	23.386	23.235	154.939
20	1	(United States) Scott Sharp^{1}	Didn't qualify		No speed
21	17	(Brazil) Affonso Giaffone^{2} R	Didn't qualify		No speed
22	12	(United States) Buzz Calkins^{3}	22.217	21.947	164.032

1. His engine caught fire in practice, and a spare was not ready on time for qualifying. He was allowed to start the race at the back of the field.
2. Couldn't qualify after his chassis had been damaged in a practice crash. He was allowed to start the race at the back of the field.
3. Changed to a backup car following a crash in a practice session after qualifying.

== Race report ==
The Phoenix event resulted in a slow, attrition-filled race, as 83 of the 200 laps were run under nine caution periods. Six cautions were caused by engine failures and oil spills, five of those from Oldsmobile engines, which suffered a dozen failures overall throughout the weekend. It wasn't until after the event that the brand identified the issue as an oil line fitting that wasn't suitable in the plumbing system of the new IRL chassis. Despite that, the race was won by Jim Guthrie, whose engine 860 miles of running by the end of the day.

From his front-row position, Guthrie tried to jump Tony Stewart on the outside, but the pole-sitter held on into Turn 1, while Scott Goodyear lost two places. Roberto Guerrero suffered a battery failure and was unable to get going from 10th on the grid. After failing to bring the car up to speed, he had to pull into the apron on Lap 2, bringing out a caution. He was able to take the restart on Lap 7, albeit five laps down. Guthrie tried Stewart again on the restart, but had to defend himself from Arie Luyendyk. John Paul Jr. gained four spots and was already in 4th place, having passed three cars at the start of the race.

On Lap 12, Luyendyk's brand new engine, which had been installed the day prior, went up in smoke, triggering another caution period. Paul Jr. passed Guthrie for second in the Lap 19 restart, but he didn't have enough speed to go after Stewart, and Guthrie reclaimed the spot three laps later, staying within 3–4 seconds of the leader. Affonso Giaffone gained eight positions in ten laps, and was up to 6th place by Lap 35. After a good stint, being as high as 7th, Buddy Lazier slowly faded to 9th place before retiring on Lap 33 with an engine failure that caused extensive oil spilling on the track and pit entry, triggering a caution that lasted for 10 laps due to the cleanup.

As the leaders made their first pit stop, Guthrie had the lapped car of Roberto Guerrero on the inside, and had to swerve up the track, missing the pits. He was serviced a lap later, dropping several places. During his stop, John Paul Jr. suffered an electrical issue and lost several laps, leaving Scott Goodyear and Robbie Buhl as Stewart's main contenders. Meanwhile, Giaffone, Eddie Cheever (7th before the caution period), Kenny Bräck (10th) and Scott Sharp (11th) stayed on track, and led the restart on Lap 45, with 12 drivers on the lead lap. Stewart passed Sharp, and both were able to put Bräck behind on that lap. The three of them quickly caught up to Cheever, and passed him on Lap 51 when he run high on Turn 3 due to a misfire. In the meantime, Guthrie had passed four cars on track.

On Lap 52, Scott Goodyear had an engine failure on the exit of Turn 1 while running sixth, and Marco Greco spun on the oil. Buhl, who had been passed by Greco on the restart and was trying to avoid the crash, was hit by Sam Schmidt. Just behind them, Jeret Schroeder lost control of the car and crashed into the outside wall. Among the five-car incident, only Greco, who remained in 7th place, and Schmidt, who lost a lap, continued, while Schroeder was transported by ambulance with a mild concussion and a shoulder abrasion. During the caution, Affonso Giaffone, Kenny Bräck and Eddie Cheever made their pit stops, handing the lead to Stewart, who made a late splash-and-go while retaining the race lead. Giaffone spun on the grass during the restart and would stop again on Lap 61.

Scott Sharp stayed out again and took advantage of Stewart's cold tires to grab the lead on the Lap 61 restart, only for his engine to blow up four laps later. He was able to pull into an access road located after Turn 1, but the caution came out two laps later when John Paul Jr. slowed on the backstretch. With only six drivers on the lead lap, Eddie Cheever made another pit stop, placing behind Bräck for the Lap 76 restart. Davey Hamilton had been greatly benefitted by the attrition rate and got past Greco for third, but both were passed by Bräck, who emerged as a serious contender in his debut Indy car race, although he was 10 seconds behind Stewart and Guthrie by then. Another newcomer, Billy Roe, started losing oil on Lap 82 while running 11th and was black flagged, but he was unaware of the situation until he crashed heavily on Lap 85, entering Turn 3.

During a long caution, Stewart chose to make another pit stop on Lap 95, while Guthrie's crew gambled on staying out to make their stop on Lap 120 to try and jump Stewart in the event of more caution laps. After the restart on Lap 99, Guthrie pulled an 11-second lead over Kenny Bräck, while Stewart climbed to third by Lap 112. Five laps later, Giaffone, running a lap down in 7th place, pulled to the side of the track with a half-shaft problem, and brought a timely caution for Guthrie's odds. Their strategy from that point was to go flat-out until the end, hoping to make it without another pit stop and the help of two more caution periods at the very least. Stewart topped off a lap later than Guthrie, and emerged in front of him, but Team Menard was already planning for a late splash-and-go. Another lengthy clean-up ensued, on which Eddie Cheever retired with an oil pressure issue, after repeatedly trying to pass Marco Greco.

As the front of the field, led by lapped cars, was already on Turn 3 for a Lap 129 restart, with the Pace Car pulling into the pit lane, race officials suddenly aborted the restart for an additional track inspection, which caused Pace Car driver Johnny Rutherford to swerve back onto the left side of the track before being passed by four different drivers, including race leader Kenny Bräck, who was due to make his second pit-stop. No penalties were issued, and the race was finally underway on Lap 133, with Hamilton and Stewart passing Greco simultaneously on the outside of Turn 3; Hamilton would be passed by Stewart in the same fashion two laps later, after being blocked by Groff.

By Lap 140, Guthrie also got past Hamilton, and joined Stewart in pursuit of Bräck. All three drivers were a second apart from each other when, on Lap 146, Bräck run high into the oil dry in Turn 3, spun and crashed. Stewart pitted for a splash of fuel and some tyre pressure changes just before the Lap 155 restart, and quickly passed Greco. During the longest green flag run of the day, at just 26 laps, Stewart struggled to navigate the heavy traffic situation on the track, and Guthrie had easily gained a 11-second lead by Lap 178, with Stewart a further four seconds behind Hamilton. There were only three cars on the lead lap, as Greco had gone a lap down in fourth place.

20 laps from the end, Sam Schmidt was trying to hunt down Stéphan Grégoire for fifth place when he lost the right-rear tyre entering Turn 3, right in front of Davey Hamilton. He was transported by ambulance with mid-back pain, but he was not injured. The rear-first crash pounded a significant hole in the concrete wall that had to be fixed with a metal plate over eleven laps of caution. Having complained of handling issues in the previous laps, and aiming to run down Guthrie after the restart, Stewart pitted twice under the yellow, the first one for drastic changes in his rear wing, and the second one for fuel and 'option' tires for better grip, briefly stalling the engine afterwards. Guthrie stayed out, looking to stretch his fuel.

As the race restarted with 9 laps to go, Stewart was placed behind the lapped cars of Marco Greco and Roberto Guerrero, which he passed in the following lap. Aiming for the win, Stewart passed Hamilton on the outside of Turn 3 with five laps to go, and was gaining half a second per lap on Guthrie, but he ran out of time, and Guthrie held on by less than a second. Emulating Arie Luyendyk's win with an unsponsored car back in 1991, the $170,100 payoff partially helped Guthrie on settling his debts. This would be Guthrie's one-and-only podium finish of his Indy car career. A month later, the team announced a year-long sponsorship agreement with Jacuzzi, which guaranteed a proper effort for the Indianapolis 500 with new engines and a back-up car.

After Stewart, Davey Hamilton had his first podium finish in Indy car racing and jumped to second in the standings, while Marco Greco, who kept his top-10 streak, and Stéphan Grégoire finished in the top-5 for the first time. While leading a restart on Lap 138 as an already lapped car, Mike Groff's car had started to smoke and it was black flagged, losing four laps to fix the issue and falling down to 18th place at one point. However, high attrition brought Groff a sixth place finish, retaining the championship lead in the process. With a very basic setup in his back-up car, Buzz Calkins was not a factor during the race and lost several laps, but managed to see the checkered flag in 8th place.

For the fifth race in a row, the Indy Racing League had produced a first-time Indy car winner, an unprecedented feat in post-war Indy car history, and none of the top-6 drivers had ever won an Indy car race before, for the first time since the 1959 Golden State 100 at the California State Fairgrounds in Sacramento. This became the second slowest Indy car race ever held at Phoenix, with an average speed of just 89.19 mph, just under 3 mph faster than the 1967 Jimmy Bryan Memorial at the same track, and slower than any NASCAR Cup Series race ever held at Phoenix since their debut in 1988. At 2 hours and 14 minutes, it holds the record for the longest Indy car race at Phoenix, being 45 minutes longer than the 1986 Circle K/Fiesta Bowl 200, which had the average speed record at 134 mph.

== Race Results ==
=== Box Score ===
Pos	No.	Driver	Team	Laps	Time/Retired	Grid	Laps Led	Points
1	27	(United States) Jim Guthrie R	Blueprint Racing	200	2:14:32.667	2	74	35
2	2	(United States) Tony Stewart	Team Menard	200	+ 0.854 sec	1	85	36
3	14	(United States) Davey Hamilton	A. J. Foyt Enterprises	200	Running	14	0	32
4	22	(Brazil) Marco Greco	Team Scandia	199	+ 1 lap	8	0	31
5	77	(France) Stéphan Grégoire	Chastain Motorsports	199	+ 1 lap	19	0	30
6	10	(United States) Mike Groff	Byrd-Cunningham Racing	195	+ 5 laps	16	0	29
7	21	(Colombia) Roberto Guerrero W	Pagan Racing	194	+ 6 laps	10	0	28
8	12	(United States) Buzz Calkins	Bradley Motorsports	187	+ 13 laps	22	0	27
9	18	(United States) John Paul Jr.	PDM Racing	179	+ 21 laps	11	0	26
10	16	(United States) Sam Schmidt R	Blueprint Racing	176	Accident T4	6	0	25
11	4	(Sweden) Kenny Bräck R	Galles Racing	145	Accident T4	9	24	24
12	51	(United States) Eddie Cheever	Team Cheever	120	Overheating	7	0	23
13	17	(Brazil) Affonso Giaffone R	Chitwood Motorsports	114	Half Shaft	21	13	22
14	33	(Spain) Fermín Vélez R	Team Scandia	94	Electrical	15	0	21
15	50	(United States) Billy Roe R	Eurointernational	82	Accident T3/Engine	17	0	20
16	1	(United States) Scott Sharp	A. J. Foyt Enterprises	65	Engine	20	4	19
17	6	(Canada) Scott Goodyear	Treadway Racing	52	Engine	3	0	18
18	3	(United States) Robbie Buhl	Team Menard	51	Accident T2	5	0	17
19	30	(United States) Jeret Schroeder R	McCormack Motorsports	51	Accident T2	12	0	16
20	40	(United States) Jack Miller R	Arizona Motorsport	33	Fuel Pickup	18	0	15
21	91	(United States) Buddy Lazier	Hemelgarn Racing	31	Engine	13	0	14
22	5	(Netherlands) Arie Luyendyk W	Treadway Racing	11	Mechanical	4	0	13

=== Race Statistics ===
- Lead changes: 10 among 5 drivers

Lap Leaders
Laps	Leader
1–41	Tony Stewart
42	Jim Guthrie
43–55	Affonso Giaffone
56–61	Tony Stewart
62–65	Scott Sharp
66–94	Tony Stewart
95–120	Jim Guthrie
121	Tony Stewart
122–145	Kenny Bräck
146–153	Tony Stewart
154–200	Jim Guthrie

Cautions: 9 for 86 laps
Laps	Reason
2–6	Tow-in for Roberto Guerrero (battery issues)
13–18	Arie Luyendyk stopped, oil on the track
36–44	Buddy Lazier's engine leaks oil on the track
52–60	Goodyear's engine leaks oil on the track; Buhl, Schroeder and Schmidt's crash
69–75	Oil on track from Scott Sharp's engine
85–98	Billy Roe's crash; oil on the track
117–132	Affonso Giaffone stopped, oil on the track
146–154	Kenny Bräck's crash
180–190	Sam Schmidt's crash

== Standings after the race ==
Drivers' Championship standings

Pos	Driver	Points
1	(United States) Mike Groff	125
2	(United States) Davey Hamilton	114
3	(United States) Buzz Calkins	113
4	(Brazil) Marco Greco	112
5	(Colombia) Roberto Guerrero	106

- Note: Only the top five positions are included for the standings.
