= 1997 True Value 500 =

(United States) 1997 Texas
Race details
- 6th round of the 1996–1997 Indy Racing League season
- Date: June 7, 1997
- Official name: True Value 500
- Location: Texas Motor Speedway
- Course: Permanent racing facility 1.500 mi / 2.414 km
- Distance: 208 laps 312.000 mi / 502.115 km
- Weather: Dry with temperatures reaching up to 86 °F (30 °C); wind speeds up to 9.9 miles per hour (15.9 km/h) were sighted during the race

Pole position
- Driver: (United States) Tony Stewart (Team Menard)
- Time: 1:36.929 (3 laps + pit stop)

Fastest lap
- Driver: (United States) Tony Stewart (Team Menard)
- Time: 24.760 (on lap 97 of 208)

Podium
- First: (Netherlands) Arie Luyendyk (Treadway Racing)
- Second: (United States) Billy Boat (A. J. Foyt Enterprises)
- Third: (United States) Davey Hamilton (A. J. Foyt Enterprises)

The 1997 True Value 500 was the sixth round of the 1996–1997 Indy Racing League season. The race was held on June 7, 1997, at the 1.500 mi (2.414 km) Texas Motor Speedway in Fort Worth, Texas, and it marked the first American open-wheel superspeedway night race.

== Qualifying ==
The qualifying format was 3-laps, with the average speed deciding grid positions. During their 3rd lap, every driver had to enter the pit lane (with a 120 mph speed limit), stop in a designated spot 30 feet short of the start/finish line and make a pit stop. A maximum of 3 crew members were allowed: one jacking the car up and the other two changing only the front and rear right tires. Finally, the driver had to cross the finish line to complete his qualifying attempt.

=== Qualifying results ===
Key	Meaning
R	Rookie
W	Past winner

Pos	No.	Name	Lap 1	Lap 2	Lap 3	Best (in mph)	Total time
1	2	(United States) Tony Stewart	24.971	24.943	47.015	216.494	1:36.929
2	3	(United States) Robbie Buhl	25.738	25.515	46.369	211.640	1:37.622
3	4	(Sweden) Kenny Bräck R	25.499	25.521	46.877	211.773	1:37.897
4	91	(United States) Buddy Lazier	25.618	25.638	46.737	210.789	1:37.993
5	6	(Canada) Scott Goodyear	25.906	25.576	46.526	211.135	1:38.008
6	97	(United States) Greg Ray R	25.791	25.746	48.386	209.741	1:39.923
7	51	(United States) Eddie Cheever	26.591	26.230	47.243	205.871	1:40.244
8	27	(United States) Jim Guthrie R	25.877	25.777	48.969	209.489	1:40.623
9	14	(United States) Davey Hamilton	25.539	25.530	50.752	211.516	1:41.821
10	12	(United States) Buzz Calkins	26.390	26.315	49.315	205.206	1:42.020
11	5	(Netherlands) Arie Luyendyk	25.771	25.882	50.368	209.538	1:42.021
12	22	(Brazil) Marco Greco	25.986	25.950	50.275	208.092	1:42.211
13	30	(United States) Robbie Groff R	25.856	25.852	53.043	208.881	1:44.751
14	28	(United States) Mark Dismore	26.023	25.641	53.629	210.600	1:45.293
15	21	(Colombia) Roberto Guerrero	26.393	26.375	53.202	204.739	1:45.970
16	17	(Brazil) Affonso Giaffone R	26.161	26.119	53.779	206.746	1:46.059
17	8	(Italy) Vincenzo Sospiri R	27.437	27.401	52.440	197.073	1:47.278
18	44	(United States) Allen May R	26.606	26.578	55.115	203.176	1:48.299
19	40	(United States) Jack Miller R	29.131	28.237	51.213	191.238	1:48.581
20	16	(United States) Sam Schmidt R	28.290	27.413	1:05.070	196.987	2:00.773
21	1	(United States) Billy Boat^{1} R	25.680	25.467	Unfinished	212.039	No time
22	7	(Chile) Eliseo Salazar^{2}	25.676	Waved off		210.313	No time
23	10	(United States) Johnny Unser^{3}	Did not qualify			No speed	No time
24	33	(Spain) Fermín Vélez^{4} R	Did not qualify			No speed	No time
25	18	(United States) Tyce Carlson^{5} R	Did not qualify			No speed	No time
26	34	(Italy) Alessandro Zampedri^{4}	Did not qualify			No speed	No time

1. Could not complete his qualifying run after missing his pit box.
2. Entered the pits at the end of the second lap by mistake.
3. Named for the ride after qualifying, he was allowed to start the race at the back of the field.
4. Could not qualify because of an engine shortage in Team Scandia, but was allowed to start the race at the back of the field.
5. Crashed in practice and could not qualify, but was allowed to start the race at the back of the field with a backup chassis loaned by Blueprint Racing.

==== Failed to qualify or withdrew ====
- (United States) Mike Groff for Byrd-Cunningham Racing - fractured his lower left tibia during practice. Replaced by (United States) Johnny Unser
- (United States) Scott Harrington R for Johansson Motorsports - withdrew prior to the start of practice.
- (United States) Billy Roe R for EuroInternational - withdrew prior to the start of practice.
- (France) Stéphan Grégoire for Chastain Motorsports - withdrew prior to the start of practice.
- (United States) Lyn St. James for Hemelgarn Racing - withdrew prior to the start of practice.

== Race report ==
At the start, Marco Greco's engine exploded and trailed oil and metal pieces all over the track, leading to a lengthy cleanup. When the green flag finally fell on lap 20, the Menard cars pulled off, with only Buddy Lazier and Greg Ray being able to keep up. However, the four stayed out too long after everyone else had pitted and lost time on old tires; Tony Stewart ran out of fuel on lap 69 and fell a lap down. By lap 70, a four-way battle was occurring for the lead, and popular Jim Guthrie assumed it on lap 76, only to lose it five laps later after blowing a tire exiting turn 4. Lazier then took over the lead while Arie Luyendyk worked his way towards the front, having rookie Billy Boat within striking distance, and Stewart rapidly reeling them in.

During a caution around lap 140, the scoring problems began. After Lazier and Stewart had had a furious wheel-to-wheel duel, Luyendyk inexplicably dropped out of the top 10 in the electronic scoring system, which was not properly counting his laps and those of several other drivers, including Scott Goodyear. Tyce Carlson and Goodyear got bottled up on a restart on lap 143, made contact, and spun into the quad-oval infield. Lazier retired on lap 157 with engine failure and Stewart and Boat appeared to be on the lead lap by themselves. Stewart set off to lap the field, which he appeared to have done by lap 180.

On lap 190, Stewart, in traffic, handed the lead to Luyendyk by waving him, thinking the Dutch driver was a lap down. Stewart, thus, was scored as the leader in the final laps, and appeared to have nearly a one-lap lead over Billy Boat. However, as he crossed the line with two laps to go, the engine blew. His car spun in turn 1, and crashed into the outside wall. Boat caught up, appeared to take the lead and, due to the scoring error, race officials showed him the checkered flag as the winner of the race. While Boat and his car owner A. J. Foyt were celebrating in victory lane, Luyendyk stormed in, claiming he had won the race and demanding an explanation from the officials. He was intercepted by Foyt, who slapped Luyendyk, told him to leave and shoved him to the ground before security separated the two and led Luyendyk away. The incident was not shown live in the broadcast, as it happened right after the interviews, but was caught on camera by the TV crew. Foyt and Luyendyk were fined $20,000 and $14,000 respectively, for unsportsmanlike behavior.

External videos
- A. J. Foyt post-race slap on Arie Luyendyk

The race tape was reviewed and it was determined that Luyendyk was right; he had finished on a lap by himself and had actually completed more laps than the scheduled race distance, being declared the official winner the following day. The results was revised back to the proper ending lap, shuffling the entire top 10. Luyendyk, fresh off his Indy 500 victory, became the first driver to win two IRL races in a row, but it took almost a week to determine. Foyt, however refused to return the trophy and retains the original to this day. A duplicate was awarded to Luyendyk. The outcome of this race had far-reaching implications for the IRL far beyond the race itself. From the beginning of the IRL until this time, United States Automobile Club (USAC) performed the timing and scoring of IRL races, as well as other functions such as technical inspection. The following week, in the wake of the Texas scoring scandal, the restart problems two weeks earlier at Indianapolis and the ensuing bad publicity, USAC was immediately removed from sanctioning the series, putting that organization completely out of Indy car racing after 42 years. The league switched to in-house sanctioning starting with the next event.

== Race results ==
=== Original box score ===
Key	Meaning
R	Rookie
W	Past winner

Unofficial results before the revision
Pos	No.	Driver	Team	Laps	Time/Retired	Grid	Laps Led
1	1	(United States) Billy Boat R	A. J. Foyt Enterprises	208	2:21:25	21	18
2	14	(United States) Davey Hamilton	A. J. Foyt Enterprises	208	+ 5.487 sec	9	4
3	5	(Netherlands) Arie Luyendyk	Treadway Racing	208	+ 15.448 sec	11	0
4	2	(United States) Tony Stewart	Team Menard	206	Engine/Contact	1	117
5	7	(Chile) Eliseo Salazar	Team Scandia	206	+ 2 laps	22	3
6	51	(United States) Eddie Cheever	Team Cheever	205	+ 3 laps	7	0
7	8	(Italy) Vincenzo Sospiri R	Team Scandia	205	+ 3 laps	17	0
8	10	(United States) Johnny Unser	Byrd-Cunningham Racing	204	+ 4 laps	23	0
9	6	(Canada) Scott Goodyear	Treadway Racing	204	+ 4 laps	5	0
10	97	(United States) Greg Ray R	Knapp Motorsports	204	+ 4 laps	6	0
11	28	(United States) Mark Dismore	Kelley Racing-PDM	203	+ 5 laps	14	0
12	34	(Italy) Alessandro Zampedri	Team Scandia	202	+ 6 laps	26	0
13	21	(Colombia) Roberto Guerrero	Pagan Racing	202	+ 6 laps	15	0
14	18	(United States) Tyce Carlson R	PDM Racing	184	+ 24 laps	25	0
15	30	(United States) Robbie Groff R	McCormack Motorsports	173	Engine	13	3
16	3	(United States) Robbie Buhl	Team Menard	167	Engine	2	0
17	91	(United States) Buddy Lazier	Hemelgarn Racing	157	Engine	4	57
18	4	(Sweden) Kenny Bräck R	Galles Racing	118	Water Leak	3	0
19	12	(United States) Buzz Calkins	Bradley Motorsports	98	Head Gasket	10	0
20	17	(Brazil) Affonso Giaffone R	Chitwood Motorsports	82	Engine Fire	16	0
21	27	(United States) Jim Guthrie R	Blueprint Racing	81	Tire/Contact	8	6
22	44	(United States) Allen May R	Sinden Racing	36	Accident	18	0
23	16	(United States) Sam Schmidt R	Blueprint Racing	36	Accident	20	0
24	40	(United States) Jack Miller R	Sinden Racing	24	Electrical	19	0
25	33	(Spain) Fermín Vélez R	Team Scandia	1	Illness	24	0
26	22	(Brazil) Marco Greco	Team Scandia	0	Engine/Spin	12	0

=== Revised Official Results ===
Pos	No.	Driver	Team	Laps	Time/Retired	Grid	Laps Led	Points
1	5	(Netherlands) Arie Luyendyk	Treadway Racing	208	2:19:48.166	11	20	35
2	1	(United States) Billy Boat R	A. J. Foyt Enterprises	207	+ 1 lap	21	10	33
3	14	(United States) Davey Hamilton	A. J. Foyt Enterprises	207	+ 1 lap	9	4	32
4	6	(Canada) Scott Goodyear	Treadway Racing	207	+ 1 lap	5	0	31
5	2	(United States) Tony Stewart	Team Menard	206	Engine/Contact	1	100	33
6	51	(United States) Eddie Cheever	Team Cheever	206	+ 2 laps	7	5	29
7	7	(Chile) Eliseo Salazar	Team Scandia	204	+ 2 laps	22	3	28
8	97	(United States) Greg Ray R	Knapp Motorsports	204	+ 4 laps	6	0	27
9	8	(Italy) Vincenzo Sospiri R	Team Scandia	204	+ 4 laps	17	0	26
10	10	(United States) Johnny Unser	Byrd-Cunningham Racing	203	+ 5 laps	23	0	25
11	28	(United States) Mark Dismore	Kelley Racing-PDM	203	+ 5 laps	14	0	24
12	34	(Italy) Alessandro Zampedri	Team Scandia	201	+ 7 laps	26	0	23
13	21	(Colombia) Roberto Guerrero	Pagan Racing	201	+ 7 laps	15	0	22
14	18	(United States) Tyce Carlson R	PDM Racing	184	+ 24 laps	25	0	21
15	30	(United States) Robbie Groff R	McCormack Motorsports	173	Engine	13	3	20
16	3	(United States) Robbie Buhl	Team Menard	167	Engine	2	0	19
17	91	(United States) Buddy Lazier	Hemelgarn Racing	157	Engine	4	57	18
18	4	(Sweden) Kenny Bräck R	Galles Racing	118	Water Leak	3	0	17
19	12	(United States) Buzz Calkins	Bradley Motorsports	98	Head Gasket	10	0	16
20	17	(Brazil) Affonso Giaffone R	Chitwood Motorsports	82	Engine Fire	16	0	15
21	27	(United States) Jim Guthrie R	Blueprint Racing	81	Tire/Contact	8	6	14
22	44	(United States) Allen May R	Sinden Racing	36	Accident	18	0	13
23	16	(United States) Sam Schmidt R	Blueprint Racing	36	Accident	20	0	12
24	40	(United States) Jack Miller R	Sinden Racing	24	Electrical	19	0	11
25	33	(Spain) Fermín Vélez R	Team Scandia	1	Illness	24	0	10
26	22	(Brazil) Marco Greco	Team Scandia	0	Engine/Spin	12	0	9

=== Race statistics ===
- Lead changes: 14 among 9 drivers

Lap Leaders
Laps	Leader
1-68	Tony Stewart
69-71	Eliseo Salazar
72-75	Davey Hamilton
76-81	Jim Guthrie
82-84	Billy Boat
85-87	Robbie Groff
88-120	Buddy Lazier
121-125	Eddie Cheever
126-132	Billy Boat
133	Tony Stewart
134-157	Buddy Lazier
158-169	Tony Stewart
170	Arie Luyendyk
171-189	Tony Stewart
190-208	Arie Luyendyk

Cautions: 8 for 60 laps
Laps	Reason
1-18	Marco Greco's blown engine; debris
24-26	Jack Miller stopped on track
37-46	Sam Schmidt and Allen May crash
81-91	Jim Guthrie crash / Affonso Giaffone's blown engine
137-141	Kenny Brack's engine leaks water on track
142-148	Scott Goodyear and Tyce Carlson contact
168-171	Robbie Buhl's engine leaks oil on track
207-208	Tony Stewart crash

== Standings after the race ==
Drivers' Championship standings

Pos	Driver	Points
1	(United States) Davey Hamilton	175
2	(United States) Tony Stewart	166
3	(United States) Buzz Calkins	153
4	(United States) Mike Groff	148
5	(Netherlands) Arie Luyendyk	147

- Note: Only the top five positions are included for the standings.
