= 1997 Samsonite 200 =

(United States) 1997 Pikes Peak
Race details
- 7th round of the 1996–1997 Indy Racing League season
- Date: June 29, 1997
- Official name: Samsonite 200
- Location: Pikes Peak International Raceway
- Course: Permanent racing facility 1.000 mi / 1.609 km
- Distance: 200 laps 200.000 mi / 321.869 km
- Weather: Dry with temperatures reaching up to 84.9 °F (29.4 °C); wind speeds reaching up to 20 miles per hour (32 km/h)

Pole position
- Driver: (United States) Scott Sharp (A. J. Foyt Enterprises)
- Time: 20.441

Fastest lap
- Driver: (United States) Jimmy Kite (Team Scandia)
- Time: 21.465 (on lap 15 of 200)

Podium
- First: (United States) Tony Stewart (Team Menard)
- Second: (France) Stéphan Grégoire (Chastain Motorsports)
- Third: (United States) Davey Hamilton (A. J. Foyt Enterprises)

The 1997 Samsonite 200 (also referred to as the Colorado 200 on ABC's TV coverage) was the seventh round of the 1996–1997 Indy Racing League. The race was held on June 29, 1997, at the 1.000 mi (1.609 km) Pikes Peak International Raceway in Fountain, Colorado.

== Qualifying Results ==
| Key | Meaning |
|---|---|
| R | Rookie |
| W | Past winner |

| Pos | No. | Name | Lap 1 | Lap 2 | Best (in mph) |
|---|---|---|---|---|---|
| 1 | 1 | (United States) Scott Sharp | 20.441 | 20.485 | 176.117 |
| 2 | 2 | (United States) Tony Stewart | 20.584 | 20.569 | 175.021 |
| 3 | 6 | (Canada) Scott Goodyear | 20.663 | 20.671 | 174.224 |
| 4 | 14 | (United States) Davey Hamilton | 20.704 | 20.783 | 173.879 |
| 5 | 21 | (Colombia) Roberto Guerrero | 21.039 | 20.717 | 173.770 |
| 6 | 4 | (Sweden) Kenny Bräck R | 20.743 | 20.773 | 173.553 |
| 7 | 12 | (United States) Buzz Calkins | 20.870 | 20.892 | 172.496 |
| 8 | 5 | (Netherlands) Arie Luyendyk | 21.006 | 20.886 | 172.364 |
| 9 | 33 | (United States) Jimmy Kite R | 20.977 | 20.963 | 171.731 |
| 10 | 17 | (Brazil) Affonso Giaffone R | 20.978 | 21.115 | 171.608 |
| 11 | 77 | (France) Stéphan Grégoire | 21.068 | 20.978 | 171.608 |
| 12 | 91 | (United States) Buddy Lazier | 21.009 | 20.985 | 171.551 |
| 13 | 51 | (United States) Eddie Cheever | 21.018 | 21.041 | 171.282 |
| 14 | 7 | (Chile) Eliseo Salazar | 21.018 | 21.219 | 171.282 |
| 15 | 18 | (United States) Billy Boat R | 21.057 | 21.040 | 171.103 |
| 16 | 30 | (United States) Robbie Groff R | 21.122 | 21.511 | 170.438 |
| 17 | 97 | (United States) Greg Ray R | 21.178 | 21.323 | 169.988 |
| 18 | 22 | (Italy) Vincenzo Sospiri R | 21.592 | 21.257 | 169.356 |
| 19 | 10 | (United States) Johnny Unser | 21.754 | 21.813 | 165.487 |
| 20 | 40 | (United States) Jack Miller R | 21.785 | 21.776 | 165.320 |
| 21 | 28 | (United States) Mark Dismore | 22.140 | 22.145 | 162.602 |
| 22 | 70 | (Brazil) Marco Greco^{1} | Did not qualify | | No speed |

1. Couldn't qualify after his chassis had been damaged in a practice crash. He was allowed to start the race at the back of the field.

=== Failed to qualify or withdrew ===
- (United States) Jim Guthrie R for Blueprint Racing - crashed during Friday's first practice session and was hospitalised with a fractured vertebra.
- (United States) Robbie Buhl for Team Menard - suffered a concussion during testing on June 13 and was unable to compete.
- (United States) Mike Groff for Byrd-Cunningham Racing - entered for the race, but not cleared to drive because of the injuries suffered at Texas. Replaced by (United States) Johnny Unser
- (United States) John Paul Jr. for PDM Racing - entered for the race, but not cleared to drive because of the injuries suffered at Indianapolis. Replaced by (United States) Billy Boat R
- (Italy) Alessandro Zampedri for Team Scandia - Although not officially withdrawn for the weekend, he didn't appear at the track, as Team Scandia downgraded its operation from five to three cars following an engine shortage at Texas and a reshuffle of the team's lineup,

== Race Report ==
Tony Stewart came into this race having just missed victory in the past three IRL races, but he put the issue beyond doubt by dominating this race, leading all but seven of the 200 laps. The race started off with polesitter Scott Sharp wrecking on the first lap. He suffered a non-contact brain injury, despite relatively minor damage to the car. The accident (following a similar accident 2 weeks before which forced Stewart's teammate Robbie Buhl to miss the race) revived concern about the cars' inability to absorb energy in a rear-end accident, leading to changes in the gearbox case and bellhousing. Sharp would miss the rest of the season as the result of the injury. Turns 2 and 4 were treacherous all day, and several early crashes resulted in lengthy cleanups and many laps under caution.

Eddie Cheever dogged Stewart all day long, and Stéphan Grégoire led his first-ever laps in an IRL race. In the end neither of them had enough for Stewart, but after a late caution Cheever, Davey Hamilton, and Grégoire dueled three-wide for second. Grégoire broke out and attempted to slingshot Stewart at the finish line, missing by about a car length. Cheever and Hamilton finished side-by-side with Hamilton taking third. The win was Stewart's first in his Indy car career, and the first win for team owner John Menard Jr. after 18 years of Indy car competition. Seven cars finished the race on the lead lap, an IRL record.

== Race results ==
=== Box Score ===
| Key | Meaning |
|---|---|
| R | Rookie |
| W | Past winner |

| Pos | No. | Driver | Team | Laps | Time/Retired | Grid | Laps Led | Points |
|---|---|---|---|---|---|---|---|---|
| 1 | 2 | (United States) Tony Stewart | Team Menard | 200 | 1:59:50.787 | 2 | 193 | 36 |
| 2 | 77 | (France) Stéphan Grégoire | Chastain Motorsports | 200 | + 0.222 sec | 11 | 5 | 33 |
| 3 | 14 | (United States) Davey Hamilton | A. J. Foyt Enterprises | 200 | Running | 4 | 0 | 32 |
| 4 | 51 | (United States) Eddie Cheever | Team Cheever | 200 | Running | 13 | 0 | 31 |
| 5 | 12 | (United States) Buzz Calkins | Bradley Motorsports | 200 | Running | 7 | 0 | 30 |
| 6 | 22 | (Italy) Vincenzo Sospiri R | Team Scandia | 200 | Running | 18 | 0 | 29 |
| 7 | 6 | (Canada) Scott Goodyear | Treadway Racing | 200 | Running | 3 | 1 | 28 |
| 8 | 91 | (United States) Buddy Lazier | Hemelgarn Racing | 198 | + 2 laps | 12 | 0 | 27 |
| 9 | 17 | (Brazil) Affonso Giaffone R | Chitwood Motorsports | 196 | + 4 laps | 10 | 0 | 26 |
| 10 | 30 | (United States) Robbie Groff R | McCormack Motorsports | 193 | Spin BS | 16 | 0 | 25 |
| 11 | 28 | (United States) Mark Dismore | Kelley Racing-PDM | 192 | + 8 laps | 21 | 0 | 24 |
| 12 | 7 | (Chile) Eliseo Salazar | Team Scandia | 190 | + 10 laps | 14 | 0 | 23 |
| 13 | 70 | (Brazil) Marco Greco | Galles Racing | 190 | + 10 laps | 22 | 0 | 22 |
| 14 | 4 | (Sweden) Kenny Bräck R | Galles Racing | 179 | Accident T4 | 6 | 0 | 21 |
| 15 | 5 | (Netherlands) Arie Luyendyk | Treadway Racing | 163 | Accident T2 | 8 | 1 | 20 |
| 16 | 40 | (United States) Jack Miller R | Arizona Motorsports | 141 | Accident T4 | 20 | 0 | 19 |
| 17 | 97 | (United States) Greg Ray R | Knapp Motorsports | 108 | Accident T4 | 17 | 0 | 18 |
| 18 | 21 | (Colombia) Roberto Guerrero | Pagan Racing | 85 | Accident T4 | 5 | 0 | 17 |
| 19 | 18 | (United States) Billy Boat R | PDM Racing | 83 | Accident T4 | 15 | 0 | 16 |
| 20 | 33 | (United States) Jimmy Kite R | Team Scandia | 39 | Accident T4 | 9 | 0 | 15 |
| 21 | 10 | (United States) Johnny Unser | Byrd-Cunningham Racing | 23 | Accident T2 | 19 | 0 | 14 |
| 22 | 1 | (United States) Scott Sharp | A. J. Foyt Enterprises | 0 | Accident T2 | 1 | 0 | 15 |

=== Race Statistics ===
- Lead changes: 5 among 4 drivers

Lap Leaders
| Laps | Leader |
|---|---|
| 1-89 | Tony Stewart |
| 90 | Arie Luyendyk |
| 91-95 | Stéphan Grégoire |
| 96-148 | Tony Stewart |
| 149 | Scott Goodyear |
| 150-200 | Tony Stewart |

Cautions: 9 for 82 laps
| Laps | Reason |
|---|---|
| 1-10 | Scott Sharp crash |
| 25-36 | Johnny Unser crash |
| 41-56 | Jimmy Kite crash |
| 87-97 | Roberto Guerrero and Billy Boat crash |
| 113-118 | Greg Ray crash |
| 146-155 | Jack Miller crash |
| 164-170 | Arie Luyendyk crash |
| 181-186 | Kenny Bräck crash |
| 194-197 | Robbie Groff crash |

== Standings after the race ==
Drivers' Championship standings

| Pos | Driver | Points |
|---|---|---|
| 1 | (United States) Davey Hamilton | 207 |
| 2 | (United States) Tony Stewart | 202 |
| 3 | (United States) Buzz Calkins | 183 |
| 4 | (Netherlands) Arie Luyendyk | 167 |
| 5 | (Brazil) Marco Greco | 162 |

- Note: Only the top five positions are included for the standings.
