= 1997 Pennzoil 200 =

(United States) 1997 New Hampshire
Race details
- 9th round of the 1996–1997 Indy Racing League season
- Date: August 17, 1997
- Official name: Pennzoil 200
- Location: New Hampshire International Speedway
- Course: Permanent racing facility 1.058 mi / 1.703 km
- Distance: 200 laps 211.600 mi / 340.600 km
- Weather: Dry with temperatures reaching up to 87.1 °F (30.6 °C); wind speeds reaching up to 15 miles per hour (24 km/h)

Pole position
- Driver: (Brazil) Marco Greco (Galles Racing)
- Time: 23.717

Fastest lap
- Driver: (United States) Vincenzo Sospiri (Team Scandia)
- Time: 24.843 (on lap 195 of 200)

Podium
- First: (United States) Robbie Buhl (Team Menard)
- Second: (Italy) Vincenzo Sospiri (Team Scandia)
- Third: (Netherlands) Arie Luyendyk (Treadway Racing)

The 1997 Pennzoil 200 was the ninth round of the 1996–1997 Indy Racing League. The race was held on August 17, 1997 at the 1.058 mi (1.703 km) New Hampshire International Speedway in Loudon, New Hampshire.

== Qualifying Results ==
Key	Meaning
R	Rookie
W	Past winner

Pos	No.	Name	Lap 1	Lap 2	Best (in mph)
1	70	(Brazil) Marco Greco	23.717	23.764	160.594
2	6	(Canada) Scott Goodyear	23.814	23.721	160.567
3	4	(Sweden) Kenny Bräck R	23.761	24.752	160.296
4	33	(United States) Jimmy Kite R	23.805	25.251	160.000
5	7	(Chile) Eliseo Salazar	23.878	24.227	159.511
6	77	(France) Stéphan Grégoire	24.281	24.268	156.947
7	3	(United States) Robbie Buhl	24.302	24.312	156.728
8	5	(Netherlands) Arie Luyendyk	24.319	24.351	156.618
9	22	(Italy) Vincenzo Sospiri R	24.589	24.549	155.151
10	21	(Colombia) Roberto Guerrero	24.563	24.683	155.062
11	18	(United States) John Paul Jr.	24.732	24.653	154.496
12	14	(United States) Davey Hamilton	24.741	24.672	154.377
13	12	(United States) Buzz Calkins	24.745	24.912	153.922
14	2	(United States) Tony Stewart	24.755	25.031	153.860
15	91	(United States) Buddy Lazier	24.791	24.777	153.723
16	1	(United States) Billy Boat R	24.966	25.327	152.559
17	17	(Brazil) Affonso Giaffone R	25.018	25.230	152.242
18	51	(United States) Eddie Cheever	25.077	25.157	151.884
19	30	(United States) Robbie Groff R	25.095	25.166	151.775
20	10	(United States) Johnny Unser	25.165	25.141	151.498
21	27	(United States) Jim Guthrie R	26.174	26.287	145.518
22	40	(United States) Jack Miller^{1} R	Didn't qualify		No speed
23	28	(United States) Mark Dismore^{2}	25.531	25.699	149.183
24	99	(United States) Sam Schmidt^{3} R	Didn't qualify		No speed

1. Didn't qualify because of handling issues. He was allowed to start the race at the back of the field.
2. Changed his Riley & Scott chassis, which was making its debut, for a Dallara chassis and was demoted to the back of the field.
3. Couldn't qualify after his chassis had been damaged in a practice crash. He was allowed to start the race at the back of the field.

=== Failed to qualify or withdrew ===
- (United States) Mike Groff for Byrd-Cunningham Racing - crashed during Friday's second practice session and was hospitalised with a concussion. Replaced by (United States) Johnny Unser.
- (United States) Greg Ray R for Knapp Motorsports - his team withdrew on Saturday morning, prior to qualifying and not having completed a single lap in practice, in order to prepare for the Las Vegas race.

== Race Report ==
The first 10 laps were run almost entirely under caution, after a spin by Robbie Groff and a gearbox failure for Jim Guthrie on the opening lap and a botched restart when Jimmy Kite spun coming off turn 4. Once racing finally got started, unexpected pole sitter Marco Greco was strong in the lead but he handed it over to Scott Goodyear on lap 35 when he pitted under caution after a crash by Sam Schmidt. On lap 63, a broken oil line fitting made him spin off turn 4 and the resulting caution and pit stop by Goodyear allowed Eliseo Salazar to take the lead, which he maintained. Not long after the restart, Buddy Lazier also spun on the tricky turn 4, bringing out the fifth caution in less than 70 laps.

Meanwhile, Eddie Cheever who started from 18th spot, moved into second place by lap 40 and assumed the lead on lap 96 when Salazar pitted under caution after a crash by Affonso Giaffone. Cheever held the lead until the next round of pit stops, starting on lap 133. Buhl had remained in the top 10 since early in the race, running in the top 5 most of the time. Goodyear's engine failed on lap 153, bringing out another caution and a round of pit stops that shuffled the field. The then-leader, Kenny Bräck, had a slow pit stop, while Stéphan Grégoire, who was running second, suffered a mechanical failure.

Cheever took over the lead again after the green, followed by Buhl. Both had gambled on stopping earlier, strategy that paid off due to the caution, as they were able to stretch his fuel load to the finish, running very close to each other. But on the second-to-last lap Cheever's gearbox failed, slowing abruptly on the backstretch. Buhl had to slow significantly too to avoid a crash and Vincenzo Sospiri rapidly made up a gap of several seconds. On the last lap, Buhl encountered heavy traffic on the backstretch. Sospiri, with less worn tires, avoided it by running high, came off turn 4 nose to tail with Buhl, and made it side by side to the finish line, but Buhl won by a nose. Robbie Buhl, coming off an injury suffered at Pikes Peak, took the closest victory in IRL history. Buhl survived a race of attrition that saw several drivers suffer mechanical failures while leading.

With only one race left in the calendar, Tony Stewart slightly increased his advantage in the championship. Despite blowing his engine with 26 laps to go in what already was a difficult weekend (having only qualified in 14th place and never being able to contend for the top spots), he got 3 more points than Davey Hamilton, who also had engine troubles 53 laps earlier. Hamilton was the only driver with mathematical chances to beat Stewart, as Cheever was 38 points behind the leader.

== Race results ==
=== Box Score ===
Pos	No.	Driver	Team	Laps	Time/Retired	Grid	Laps Led	Points
1	3	(United States) Robbie Buhl	Team Menard	200	1:46:50.574	7	3	35
2	22	(Italy) Vincenzo Sospiri R	Team Scandia	200	+ 0.064 sec	9	1	33
3	5	(Netherlands) Arie Luyendyk	Treadway Racing	200	+ 4.626 sec	8	2	32
4	7	(Chile) Eliseo Salazar	Team Scandia	200	+ 9.363 sec	5	39	31
5	4	(Sweden) Kenny Bräck R	Galles Racing	200	+ 10.164 sec	3	9	30
6	21	(Colombia) Roberto Guerrero	Pagan Racing	200	+ 15.917 sec	10	0	29
7	18	(United States) John Paul Jr.	PDM Racing	199	+ 1 lap	11	1	28
8	1	(United States) Billy Boat R	A. J. Foyt Enterprises	199	+ 1 lap	16	0	27
9	51	(United States) Eddie Cheever	Team Cheever	198	Gearbox	18	80	27
10	30	(United States) Robbie Groff R	McCormack Motorsports	198	+ 2 laps	19	0	25
11	28	(United States) Mark Dismore	Kelley Racing-PDM	197	+ 3 laps	23	0	24
12	91	(United States) Buddy Lazier	Hemelgarn Racing	195	+ 5 laps	15	0	23
13	10	(United States) Johnny Unser	Byrd-Cunningham Racing	189	+ 11 laps	20	0	22
14	2	(United States) Tony Stewart	Team Menard	174	Engine	14	0	21
15	77	(France) Stéphan Grégoire	Chastain Motorsports	154	Electrical	6	0	20
16	6	(Canada) Scott Goodyear	Treadway Racing	152	Engine	2	31	19
17	14	(United States) Davey Hamilton	A. J. Foyt Enterprises	121	Engine	12	0	18
18	17	(Brazil) Affonso Giaffone R	Chitwood Motorsports	93	Accident	17	0	17
19	40	(United States) Jack Miller R	Arizona Motorsports	81	Handling	22	0	16
20	70	(Brazil) Marco Greco	Galles Racing	59	Oil fitting	1	34	17
21	12	(United States) Buzz Calkins	Bradley Motorsports	36	Electrical	13	0	14
22	99	(United States) Sam Schmidt R	LP Racing-PCI	30	Accident	24	0	13
23	33	(United States) Jimmy Kite R	Team Scandia	4	Accident	4	0	12
24	27	(United States) Jim Guthrie R	Blueprint Racing	0	Gearbox	21	0	11

=== Race Statistics ===
- Lead changes: 12 among 9 drivers

Lap Leaders
Laps	Leader
1-34	Marco Greco
35-62	Scott Goodyear
63-64	Eliseo Salazar
65	John Paul Jr.
66-95	Eliseo Salazar
96-133	Eddie Cheever
134-136	Scott Goodyear
137-138	Arie Luyendyk
139-145	Eliseo Salazar
146-154	Kenny Bräck
155	Vincenzo Sospiri
156-197	Eddie Cheever
198-200	Robbie Buhl

Cautions: 7 for 39 laps
Laps	Reason
1-5	Jim Guthrie slow on track; Robbie Groff spin
6-10	Jimmy Kite crash
34-39	Sam Schmidt crash
61-66	Marco Greco spin
68-72	Buddy Lazier spin
95-102	Affonso Giaffone crash
154-157	Tow-in for Scott Goodyear (engine issue)

== Standings after the race ==
Drivers' Championship standings

Pos	Driver	Points
1	(United States) Tony Stewart	254
2	(United States) Davey Hamilton	244
3	(United States) Eddie Cheever	216
4	(Netherlands) Arie Luyendyk	213
5	(United States) Buddy Lazier	205

- Note: Only the top five positions are included for the standings.
