= 1996 True Value 200 =

(United States) 1996 New Hampshire
Race details
- 1st round of the 1996–1997 Indy Racing League season
- Date: August 18, 1996
- Official name: True Value 200
- Location: New Hampshire Motor Speedway
- Course: Permanent racing facility 1.058 mi / 1.703 km
- Distance: 200 laps 211.6 mi / 340.5 km
- Weather: Temperatures reaching up to 82.9 °F (28.3 °C); wind speeds up to 8.9 miles per hour (14.3 km/h)

Pole position
- Driver: (United States) Richie Hearn (Della Penna Motorsports)
- Time: 21.719

Fastest lap
- Driver: (United States) Tony Stewart (Team Menard)
- Time: 22.884 (on lap 179 of 200)

Podium
- First: (United States) Scott Sharp (A. J. Foyt Enterprises)
- Second: (United States) Buzz Calkins (Bradley Motorsports)
- Third: (Italy) Michele Alboreto (Team Scandia)

The 1996 True Value 200 was the first round of the 1996–1997 Indy Racing League. The race was held on August 18, 1996, at the 1.058-mile (1.703 km) New Hampshire International Speedway in Loudon, New Hampshire. This race was dominated, but not won, by Tony Stewart, who passed Arie Luyendyk on lap 15 and led 165 laps until he suffered an engine computer failure, with 18 laps to go and a nearly three-lap lead. 1996 Indy Racing League co-champion Scott Sharp went on to win the race.

== Pre-Race News ==
Due to the Indy Racing League's original wish to end every season at the Indianapolis 500, New Hampshire would host the 1996–1997 season opener on August 18, a race that had been counter-scheduled by CART at Road America, with the Texaco/Havoline 200 to be held on the same day. During the 11-week hiatus between seasons, some of the drivers in the series competed in CART Indy Car events. Eliseo Salazar took part in four races with Dick Simon Racing, teaming the week after Indy with Michel Jourdain Jr. at Milwaukee, and at Portland. Afterwards, Salazar raced in Michigan, where he finished 11th, and Mid-Ohio, while Jourdain did so at Detroit. On the other hand, Richie Hearn raced in Toronto, with Robbie Buhl taking part in the Indy Lights event, and Stan Wattles in his regular Atlantic Championship ride.

Tony Stewart also competed in four NASCAR events, scoring his first top-10 in his Truck Series debut at Indianapolis Raceway Park, and Scott Sharp grabbed another win in his second IMSA GT outing of the year at Sonoma Raceway, with John Paul Jr. in third place. Previously, Sharp was one of four IRL regular competitors who took part in the 24 Hours of Le Mans, along Michele Alboreto, Fermín Vélez and Mark Dismore, whose car managed to finish the race. Indy 500 runner-up Davy Jones was one of the overall winners.

Pre-season testing started at the brand-new Las Vegas Motor Speedway, whose inaugural event in September would be headlined by the IRL. 20 drivers took part in a 3-day test on June 26–28, with 12 regular drivers being joined by Mark Dismore, who had driven with Team Menard at Indianapolis. Dismore had been signed on a permanent basis, replacing the late Scott Brayton. Richie Hearn set a first unofficial track record with a 222.359 mph lap, and nine drivers went over 210 mph. In that test, the Brickell Racing car prepared by PDM Racing continued its role as a 'mule' for USAC's drivers test.

A short-lived run by Joe Gosek was followed by Andy Michner, who passed a refresher test, and by Dave Blaney, the reigning World of Outlaws sprint car champion at the time, who fell five laps short of passing his test after his engine blew. Doug Kalitta and Jack Hewitt were also scheduled to take part, although they never took a lap. New Zealand's Rob Wilson, who didn't qualify for the Indy 500, also passed a refresher test with Foyt. On the last day of testing, three Indy 500 entrants took some laps, with Brad Murphey driving for Hemelgarn Racing, Billy Roe with Team Blueprint Racing, and Randy Tolsma for McCormack Motorsports, a team that was embarking in an effort on its own after running the Zunne Group Racing operation in the Indy 500.

Additionally, Goodyear held private tests at New Hampshire on July 8–10, with A. J. Foyt Enterprises (Scott Sharp and Davey Hamilton), Pagan Racing (Roberto Guerrero), Della Penna Motorsports (Richie Hearn) and Team Scandia (Eliseo Salazar), on which Hearn suffered a hard crash during the first day, although he was uninjured. During that month, Jonathan Byrd's Racing announced the end of their partnership with Treadway Racing to become partners with Cunningham Racing. Mike Groff, who had driven for Foyt and Walker Racing during the year, was selected as their driver, replacing Johnny O'Connell, who would remain on New Hampshire's entry list before being 'scratched'. Also, McCormack Motorsports announced the signing of an injury-free Stan Wattles, on the sidelines since Leigh Miller Racing's assets were bought by Beck Motorsports in the spring.

On August 5, the entry list for New Hampshire was released, with the absence of Johnny Parsons in Blueprint's No. 16, as well as some driver changes. After being released by Team Menard, Eddie Cheever bought the car he had been using to form his own team, and Stéphan Grégoire left Hemelgarn Racing to drive in Team Scandia, subbing for Michel Jourdain Jr. in that race. Scandia also fielded a fourth car for Marco Greco, who had hired the services of the Arizona Motorsports rental crew headed by Jeff Sinden. McCormack Motorsports announced a second entry for Randy Tolsma that would be eventually scratched, Tempero–Giuffre Racing entered sportscar gentleman Jon Field, and ABF Motorsports entered supermodified driver Mike Ordway. In the following days, PDM Racing entered Tyce Carlson in its second car, and it was confirmed that the Indy Racing League would be visiting Pikes Peak International Raceway, another new oval, with a date set for July 27, 1997.

== Practice & Qualifying Report ==
An IRL open test at NHIS planned for July 23–25 was cancelled after some NASCAR drivers complained that the track was breaking up in some spots during the Jiffy Lube 300 two weeks earlier. Therefore, IRL officials scheduled two days of testing on August 14–15, prior to the start of practice. The first day was reserved for USAC's driver tests. After Tyce Carlson passed a refresher test, his car was used by NASCAR Whelen Modified drivers Tim Connolly, who passed his test, and Ted Christopher, who run out of time in his attempt after completing three phases. Five other drivers (Divina Galica, Reggie Ruggiero, Ed Flemke Jr., Tom Cravenho and Tony Turco) were left waiting for their opportunity.

Tempero–Giuffre assigned their second car to sportscar and occasional Indy Lights driver Juan Carlos Carbonell, who had been partnering Jon Field in selected IMSA rounds, but the team had to withdraw both of them, as Carbonell did not complete his test and Field crashed in Turn 1 before being approved. ABF Motorsports had switched Ordway for USAC Silver Crown talent Dave Steele, but he also crashed in Turn 4 before completing his test. During the second day, Hemelgarn Racing confirmed that Brad Murphey would be driving the No. 9 car previously used by Stéphan Grégoire, and Tempero–Giuffre announced the return of David Kudrave, while Project Indy, initially absent in the first entry list, returned to competition with Johnny Unser, their regular driver. Unser and Kudrave were among a group of 10 entered drivers who had previous Indy car experience at New Hampshire, with Eliseo Salazar, Eddie Cheever, Marco Greco and Buddy Lazier having taken part in the 1995 race; Unser, Scott Sharp, Mike Groff and Arie Luyendyk had started the 1994 race, while Roberto Guerrero, with a 4th-place finish, and Kudrave had been part of the 1993 event.

Richie Hearn dominated on Friday, leading a rain affected morning practice with a 175.335 mph lap, followed by Arie Luyendyk and Tony Stewart, and the afternoon practice at 172.297 mph, in front of Mark Dismore and Stewart. In that session, Johnny Unser lost control of his car, crashed in Turn 2 and travelled all the way down the back straight without steering until he crashed in Turn 3 again. The car was lost for the weekend, and Project Indy withdrew from the event. On Saturday morning, Michele Alboreto jumped to the front with a 173.364 mph lap, beating Stewart and Buddy Lazier. Also, ABF Motorsports returned to the track, with Joe Gosek at the wheel of the No. 96, and Brad Murphey crashed in Turn 2, leaving himself out of qualifying.

After a few runs had been completed in qualifying, Buddy Lazier set the pace with a 172.664 mph lap. That mark was surpassed by Michele Alboreto, who registered a 175.125 mph. The Italian veteran was close to obtain the pole position after Tony Stewart, Mark Dismore and Arie Luyendyk fell short, but Richie Hearn got to set the two fastest laps of the day, securing his first Indy car pole position at 175.367 mph, two miles short of André Ribeiro's 177.436 mph track record, yet fast enough for a 4th place spot in the 1995 grid. Luyendyk and Lazier completed the second row, while Dismore qualified in a career-best fifth place, in front of Eliseo Salazar and Stewart. Further behind, John Paul Jr. soldiered his 1993 Lola to an 11th place, between IRL co-champions Buzz Calkins and Scott Sharp. His teammate Tyce Carlson, qualifying for his first Indy car race, only got to do a single lap after missing his qualifying turn, but it was good enough for 16th place, in front of favourites Davey Hamilton and Roberto Guerrero.

=== Qualifying Results ===
Pos	No.	Name	Lap 1	Lap 2	Best (in mph)
1	4	(United States) Richie Hearn R	21.729	21.719	175.367
2	33	(Italy) Michele Alboreto R	21.749	21.776	175.125
3	5	(Netherlands) Arie Luyendyk	21.836	21.809	174.643
4	91	(United States) Buddy Lazier	22.059	22.402	172.664
5	3	(United States) Mark Dismore	22.175	22.137	172.056
6	7	(Chile) Eliseo Salazar	22.767	22.248	171.197
7	2	(United States) Tony Stewart R	22.249	22.457	171.190
8	51	(United States) Eddie Cheever	22.293	22.326	170.852
9	10	(United States) Mike Groff	22.321	22.325	170.638
10	12	(United States) Buzz Calkins R	22.464	22.427	169.831
11	18	(United States) John Paul Jr.	22.482	22.802	169.416
12	1	(United States) Scott Sharp	22.654	22.555	168.867
13	54	(United States) Robbie Buhl	22.962	22.576	168.710
14	22	(France) Stéphan Grégoire R	22.769	22.628	168.322
15	40	(Brazil) Marco Greco	22.989	22.905	166.287
16	28	(United States) Tyce Carlson R	22.948	No time	165.975
17	14	(United States) Davey Hamilton R	22.958	23.093	165.903
18	21	(Colombia) Roberto Guerrero	23.184	23.157	164.477
19	27	(United States) Jim Guthrie R	23.629	23.220	164.031
20	30	(United States) Stan Wattles R	23.534	23.559	161.842
21	96	(United States) Joe Gosek R	24.701	24.881	154.196
22	15	(United States) David Kudrave	25.408	25.246	150.867
23	9	(United States) Brad Murphey^{1} R	Didn't qualify		No speed

1. Couldn't qualify after his chassis had been damaged in a practice crash. He was allowed to start the race at the back of the field.

Key	Meaning
R	Rookie (in 1996)
R	Season rookie
W	Past winner

==== Failed to qualify or withdrew ====
- (United States) Johnny Unser for Project Indy

== Race Report ==
With an estimated attendance of 24.000 espectators, Richie Hearn kept the lead when the green flag was waved, while Arie Luyendyk passed Michele Alboreto for second place. The first caution came out immediately, as Jim Guthrie lost control of his car accelerating off Turn 4 due to a leak, and Robbie Buhl had found the Turn 1 wall after being loose. The race was restarted on Lap 7, and Luyendyk took advantage to overtake Hearn in Turn 3, taking the lead. Having started in seventh place, Stewart had already made it past Eliseo Salazar and a slow starting Mark Dismore at the start, and passed Buddy Lazier during the restart, paving the way for his dominating performance. He soon caught up to the leading trio on Lap 11 and, helped by traffic, grabbed the lead on Lap 14. Amid concerns that high fuel consumption would subject Team Menard to an additional pit stop, Stewart rapidly started to pull away, being at least a full second faster than anyone else: by Lap 25, he had a 10-second lead, which was increased to 22 seconds by Lap 30.

Scott Sharp climbed into the top 10, and was running in eighth place, while Hearn faded to fifth place and Lazier overtook Alboreto on Lap 29 for third place. Both were by Stewart five laps later. Before the leader could catch Luyendyk, a second caution came out as Joe Gosek, running in 17th place, spun and crashed in Turn 4. Luyendyk, Lazier, Alboreto, Sharp, Davey Hamilton, Buzz Calkins and Mike Groff elected not to pit to regain their lap, although Hamilton and Calkins wouldn't be able to keep up in green flag conditions. Stewart came out of the pits in second place, behind Luyendyk, but 10 seconds away from Lazier. His teammate Mark Dismore, who pitted just behind Stewart, spun exiting his pit box and was left backwards, having to make a 180º burnout. In doing so, he damaged his clutch and ran over an air hose, then being assessed a Stop & Go penalty before retiring a few laps later. This resembled a similar half-spin by Eddie Cheever at the Indianapolis 500, also in front of Stewart's pit box when he was his teammate, although Stewart had already left before Dismore spun.

Despite restarting with a 3-second gap on Lap 41, Luyendyk's lead lasted two further laps, as Stewart continued to obliterate the field. Sharp passed Alboreto for fourth place at the restart, and Buddy Lazier passed Luyendyk for second on Lap 64, but the Indy 500 winner had Stewart already in his mirrors three laps later, and was instructed to not let him pass. On Lap 68, Stewart dived into the inside of Lazier in Turn 3 and both drivers had a slight contact that sent Lazier into the wall. Lazier, who was still competing with partial back injuries suffered at Phoenix earlier in the year, did not suffer further back damage in this crash, but was very angry at Stewart's maneuver, being heard using profanities on ABC's broadcast, for which he later apologized. Despite the contact, Stewart only suffered cosmetical damages on his front wing.

The race restarted on Lap 77, and Stewart officially run in a lap of his own from Lap 81 after passing Richie Hearn, the only top 10 driver who had not pitted. Around the halfway mark, Team Menard lost telemetry and had the first report of an engine misfiring, with both issues seemingly being solved a few laps later. On Lap 102, Stewart lapped fifth-placed Michele Alboreto, who would lose his spot to Mike Groff 13 laps later. With clouds looming over the track, Sharp closed on Luyendyk, forcing him to run faster and pursue Hearn, before Sharp himself caught both of them. Hearn had a pending pit stop, and he decided to take it on Lap 123, but a caution for rain came out just seconds before, and Hearn had to drive by the closed pits, losing second place to Luyendyk.

One lap later, a heavy rain shower forced a 45-minute red flag period. At the restart on Lap 127, Hearn was passed on track by Scott Sharp. Stewart continued his domination, lapping Hearn on Lap 144 and Sharp on Lap 149 for a second time. On Lap 152, Luyendyk started developing problems with his right front wheel and lost direction. Despite being out of the race for 30 laps, he got out on track in the final stages of the race to score additional points. Hearn also had to do an unscheduled pit stop on Lap 161 to remove a piece of debris from his radiator and fell to sixth, ten laps before retiring due to an overheating engine that was believed to have developed during the red flag.

Stewart was comfortably heading to an undisputed victory, seconds away from gaining a third lap on the field. He was lapping consistently in the 165 mph range, and half a second faster than Sharp on average. The only concern for Team Menard was to decide when to make the last pit stop without running him out of fuel. With 18 laps to go, while his team was preparing for the pit stop, Stewart's car sustained an electrical failure coming out of turn 2. He pitted afterwards, but the car shut down in the pits. Every attempt to revive the engine was futile, forcing Stewart to retire. Sharp inherited the lead and, as all of his rivals had dropped out, he had a 20 seconds lead over Mike Groff. Sharp, however, was nursing the car, as the team suspected they were too short on fuel to make it to the finish without an additional pit stop.

While allowing both Michele Alboreto and Buzz Calkins to unlap themselves, Sharp maintained the gap and went on to achieve his first Indy car win, which was also a first for the Lola chassis and Goodyear tires in the IRL, the first for A. J. Foyt's team since his last as a driver at the 1981 Pocono 500, and the second by any Foyt's driver after Jim McElreath's victory at the 1970 Ontario 500. Buzz Calkins passed Michele Alboreto with nine laps to go and held off a late charge to finish second, as Groff fell to fourth after pitting for a splash with 6 laps to go. Also, Davey Hamilton –fifth– and Marco Greco –seventh– got their first top-10 finish. Further behind, Eliseo Salazar lost several laps with fuel issues, and Eddie Cheever's first race as a driver-owner, having run as high as seventh, was soon ruined by brakes and engine problems.

== Race results ==
Pos	No.	Driver	Team	Laps	Time/Retired	Grid	Laps Led	Points
1	1	(United States) Scott Sharp	A. J. Foyt Enterprises	200	1:36:57.912	12	18	35
2	12	(United States) Buzz Calkins R	Bradley Motorsports	200	+ 20.480	10	0	33
3	33	(Italy) Michele Alboreto R	Team Scandia	200	+ 20.732	2	0	32
4	10	(United States) Mike Groff	Byrd–Cunningham Racing	199	+ 1 lap	9	0	31
5	14	(United States) Davey Hamilton R	A. J. Foyt Enterprises	196	+ 4 laps	17	0	30
6	21	(Colombia) Roberto Guerrero	Pagan Racing	196	+ 4 laps	18	0	29
7	40	(Brazil) Marco Greco	Team Scandia/Arizona Motorsports	196	+ 4 laps	15	0	28
8	22	(France) Stéphan Grégoire R	Team Scandia	192	+ 8 laps	14	0	27
9	7	(Chile) Eliseo Salazar	Team Scandia	190	+ 10 laps	6	0	26
10	18	(United States) John Paul Jr.	PDM Racing	190	+ 10 laps	11	0	25
11	28	(United States) Tyce Carlson R	PDM Racing/BRG	187	+ 13 laps	16	0	24
12	2	(United States) Tony Stewart R	Team Menard	182	Electrical	7	165	23
13	5	(Netherlands) Arie Luyendyk	Treadway Racing	170	+ 30 laps	3	11	22
14	4	(United States) Richie Hearn R	Della Penna Motorsports	166	Engine	1	6	21
15	51	(United States) Eddie Cheever	Team Cheever	166	+ 34 laps	8	0	20
16	30	(United States) Stan Wattles R	McCormack Motorsports	163	Fuel pressure	20	0	19
17	15	(United States) David Kudrave	Tempero–Giuffre Racing	118	Clutch	22	0	18
18	9	(United States) Brad Murphey R	Hemelgarn Racing	79	Handling	23	0	17
19	91	(United States) Buddy Lazier	Hemelgarn Racing	66	Accident	4	0	16
20	3	(United States) Mark Dismore	Team Menard	43	Clutch	5	0	15
21	96	(United States) Joe Gosek R	ABF Motorsports	30	Accident	21	0	14
22	54	(United States) Robbie Buhl	Beck Motorsports	0	Accident	13	0	13
23	27	(United States) Jim Guthrie R	Team Blueprint Racing	0	Accident	19	0	12

=== Race Statistics ===
- Lead changes: 5 among 4 drivers

Lap Leaders
Laps	Leader
1-6	Richie Hearn
7-13	Arie Luyendyk
14-37	Tony Stewart
38-41	Arie Luyendyk
42-182	Tony Stewart
183-200	Scott Sharp

Cautions: 4 for 25 laps
Laps	Reason
1-6	Jim Guthrie and Robbie Buhl crash
35-40	Joe Gosek crash
68-77	Buddy Lazier and Tony Stewart crash
123-126	Rain (45 minute red flag)

== Standings after the race ==
Drivers' Championship standings

Pos	Driver	Points
1	(United States) Scott Sharp	35
2	(United States) Buzz Calkins	33
3	(Italy) Michele Alboreto	32
4	(United States) Mike Groff	31
5	(United States) Davey Hamilton	30

- Note: Only the top five positions are included for the standings.

== Broadcasting ==
=== Radio ===
The fourth race as part of the Indy Racing League but the first race of the 1996-1997 season was carried live on the IMS Radio Network. Gary Lee served as chief announcer. In the booth with Lee was Mike King.

Mark Jaynes and Vince Welch were the pit reporters.

Indianapolis Motor Speedway Radio Network
Booth Announcers	Pit/garage reporters
Chief Announcer: Gary Lee; Statistician/Commentary: Mike King	Mark Jaynes; Vince Welch
