= 1996 Las Vegas 500K =

(United States) 1996 Las Vegas
Race details
- 2nd round of the 1996–1997 Indy Racing League season
- Date: September 15, 1996
- Official name: Las Vegas 500K
- Location: Las Vegas Motor Speedway
- Course: Permanent racing facility 1.500 mi / 2.414 km
- Distance: 200 laps 300.000 mi / 482.803 km
- Weather: Dry with temperatures reaching up to 90 °F (32 °C); maximum wind speeds of 20 miles per hour (32 km/h) reported throughout the day

Pole position
- Driver: (Netherlands) Arie Luyendyk (Treadway Racing)
- Time: 23.842

Fastest lap
- Driver: (United States) Richie Hearn (Della Penna Motorsports)
- Time: 24.636 (on lap 53 of 200)

Podium
- First: (United States) Richie Hearn (Della Penna Motorsports)
- Second: (Mexico) Michel Jourdain Jr. (Team Scandia)
- Third: (United States) Mike Groff (Byrd–Cunningham Racing)

The 1996 Las Vegas 500K was the second round of the 1996-1997 Indy Racing League. The race was held on September 15, 1996, and was the inaugural event for the 1.500 mi (2.414 km) Las Vegas Motor Speedway in Clark County, Nevada. It was the fifth and last race for the IRL during 1996, and, thus, the last race contested under the frozen 1995 IndyCar regulations, before the arrival of a new chassis and engine formula for 1997. Richie Hearn was the winner of the race, which featured multiple crashes and high attrition, with 83 laps under nine lengthy cautions, a red flag and four drivers being extricated from their cars.

At 300 miles in length, it tied the existing record for non-500 mile Indy Car oval races, alongside the 300-mile Trenton contests held between 1969 and 1972, as well as the 1966 Atlanta 300. With an average speed of just 115.171 mph, it became the slowest Indy car superspeedway race since the 1946 Indianapolis 500, completed at an average of 114.820 mph with qualifying speeds that were 100 mph slower. It was also the slowest race held at the Las Vegas oval by a major racing series until the 2018 edition of the NASCAR Cup Series event.

== Pre-race news ==
Less than a month after the season opener at New Hampshire, the Indy Racing League christened the new Las Vegas Motor Speedway, even though some of its amenities and facilities were still under construction. Between both rounds, Michel Jourdain Jr. raced in the last two Indy Car events of the year at Vancouver and Laguna Seca, sharing the grid in the latter with Richie Hearn. Tony Stewart took part in all three of the NASCAR Busch Series held between the IRL events, and John Paul Jr. had successful outings in IMSA GT, with a win at Mosport and a third place at the Grand Prix of Dallas.

In the meantime, the League secured the Texas Motor Speedway as a new venue. The 500-kilometer race, to be held on June 7, 1997, was announced as the first round of the planned 1997–98 season, despite being scheduled just two weeks after the Indianapolis 500. Before the announcement, Team Menard held a private test at Atlanta Motor Speedway, another track owned by Bruton Smith's Speedway Motorsports, which fueled speculations about a future IRL round at that track. Tony Stewart's fastest lap was reportedly in the 213 mph range.

The entry list was unveiled on September 4, with 26 drivers listed. Treadway Racing added a two-year-old car for Johnny O'Connell, who had missed the New Hampshire race after losing his ride with Byrd-Cunningham Racing. Dave Steele, having failed to pass his rookie test before the New Hampshire round, and Juan Carlos Carbonell, who also failed at New Hampshire but got to pass his test on an August 25 test at Phoenix, were entered again by ABF Motorsports and Tempero–Giuffre Racing, while Johnny Parsons and Michel Jourdain Jr. were back in their regular Team Blueprint Racing and Team Scandia rides after missing the previous round. IndyCar team Walker Racing entered a car with no driver assigned, and Lyn St. James also filed an entry without a car assigned, but she eventually withdrew it. One week before the race, Della Penna Motorsports announced it would leave the IRL in 1997 to complete its expected full-time move to the IndyCar World Series, with Richie Hearn as a driver.

== Practice and qualifying report ==
More entries were filed on race week for total of 29 drivers, a new high for a non-Indy 500 IRL race. On September 11, Walker confirmed that Robby Gordon would drive its final race with them at Las Vegas, as he was NASCAR bound in 1997. Gordon had just ended a lackluster season in the Indy Car World Series, and was considered by the media as the marquee name of the event. Scandia also entered another car, to be run as a second entry by the Arizona Motorsports crew, for Brazilian rookie Affonso Giaffone, who had finished third in the 1995 Indy Lights season. Despite their absence in the first entry list, Tyce Carlson and Brad Murphey were eventually confirmed by PDM Racing and Hemelgarn Racing to remain in their seats. Like Carbonell and Steele, Giaffone was required to pass the USAC rookie test, along with Stan Wattles, who had not run in a superspeedway-type event during a race weekend.

The track was deemed to be even dirtier than in June testing as practice opened. Buddy Lazier led the Friday morning practice with a 221.766 mph lap, followed by Richie Hearn and Eliseo Salazar. In the afternoon practice, Lazier finished third and was the first driver to beat Richie Hearn's unofficial lap record from testing. Neither of them got even close to Arie Luyendyk, whose impressive lap of 229.768 mph led Mark Dismore by almost 5 mph. Luyendyk remained as the pacesetter on Saturday morning practice with a lap of 226.757 mph, faster than anyone else by 2 mph. Roberto Guerrero finished second ahead of Mike Groff, but he crashed in Turn 2 one hour into the session. Guerrero was testing Pagan's backup car, a Reynard 94I that offered less drag and was being readied to qualify before the crash. In the closing minutes, Dave Steele also crashed between Turns 1 and 2 and wrote off his Lola T92, forcing ABF Motorsports to withdraw with no back-up car available. Steele had been allowed to qualify despite recording laps of no more than 202 mph.

In qualifying, championship leader Scott Sharp was the first driver to go over 220 mph with a 222.322 mph lap, being edged first by Mike Groff and then by Robby Gordon. Tony Stewart endured mechanical issues on Friday afternoon and had finished 12th in all practice sessions, but Team Menard found enough speed to put Stewart on the provisional pole with a 224.225 mph lap. It wouldn't be a match for Arie Luyendyk, as the Dutch was the only driver to lap under 24 seconds with two laps in 226 mph, and scored his third career pole position with a best lap of 226.491 mph. Stewart made it to the front row, with Gordon and Lazier making up the second row. Davey Hamilton and Groff qualified in fifth and sixth place, a career-best result for both, ahead of Sharp.

Among the newcomers, Affonso Giaffone qualified in 23rd place and Juan Carlos Carbonell was last with a very slow lap of 181.208 mph, six seconds off Luyendyk's time. During practice, Carbonell had not turned a lap above 194 mph. Michele Alboreto was restricted to an 18th place with pop-off valve issues; Michel Jourdain Jr., tenth fastest in morning practice, qualified in 22nd place after he waved off his first lap and lost a cylinder, and Eddie Cheever suffered an engine failure just before taking the green flag, which left him in 27th place.

That morning, Galles Racing announced it would field a team in the Indy Racing League in 1997 with Davy Jones, who finished second at the Indy 500 and had taken the place of Eddie Lawson a few months earlier, as their driver. Also, three-time Tour de France winner Greg LeMond announced he would start a career in open-wheel racing in Indy Lights, although he later decided to compete in the lower U.S. F2000 Championship instead. During a Shelby Pro Series support race, held before the last IRL practice session, a 49-year-old retired Las Vegas police officer named R.C. "Rod" Mathis suffered multiple injuries in a crash at Turn 4, at 3:20 p.m. He was airlifted to University Medical Center of Southern Nevada, where he was pronounced dead at 10:49 p.m., becoming the first fatality at the Las Vegas Motor Speedway.

=== Qualifying results ===
Pos	No.	Name	Lap 1	Lap 2	Best (in mph)
1	5	(Netherlands) Arie Luyendyk	23.856	23.842	226.491
2	2	(United States) Tony Stewart R	24.083	24.202	224.225
3	50	(United States) Robby Gordon	24.234	24.175	223.371
4	91	(United States) Buddy Lazier	24.355	24.222	222.938
5	14	(United States) Davey Hamilton R	24.443	24.235	222.818
6	10	(United States) Mike Groff	24.285	Waved off	222.359
7	1	(United States) Scott Sharp	24.316	24.288	222.332
8	4	(United States) Richie Hearn R	24.576	24.378	221.511
9	21	(Colombia) Roberto Guerrero	24.569	24.469	220.678
10	3	(United States) Mark Dismore	24.577	24.795	219.718
11	6	(United States) Johnny O'Connell R	24.860	24.585	219.646
12	18	(United States) John Paul Jr.	24.604	24.633	219.477
13	7	(Chile) Eliseo Salazar	24.977	24.808	217.672
14	28	(United States) Tyce Carlson R	24.873	24.828	217.496
15	54	(United States) Robbie Buhl	25.328	24.967	216.285
16	12	(United States) Buzz Calkins R	25.230	25.001	215.991
17	16	(United States) Johnny Parsons	25.017	25.092	215.853
18	33	(Italy) Michele Alboreto R	25.155	25.100	215.139
19	27	(United States) Jim Guthrie R	25.120	Waved off	214.968
20	64	(United States) Johnny Unser	25.278	25.300	213.624
21	30	(United States) Stan Wattles R	25.418	25.333	213.161
22	22	(Mexico) Michel Jourdain Jr. R	Waved off	25.398	212.615
23	34	(Brazil) Affonso Giaffone R	25.802	25.563	211.243
24	40	(Brazil) Marco Greco	25.937	25.691	210.190
25	8	(France) Stéphan Grégoire R	26.127	25.717	209.978
26	9	(United States) Brad Murphey R	26.388	26.219	205.958
27	51	(United States) Eddie Cheever	28.003	Waved off	192.836
28	15	(Chile) Juan Carlos Carbonell R	30.204	29.800	181.208

Key	Meaning
R	Rookie (in 1996)
R	Season rookie
W	Past winner

==== Failed to qualify or withdrew ====
- (United States) Dave Steele R for ABF Motorsports

== Race Report ==
An estimated crowd of 67.132 spectators made it to the yet unfinished Las Vegas Motor Speedway for its first big race, despite long traffic jams that continued throughout the race. Windy conditions during the afternoon played havoc with the track, blowing sand onto the outside line. Arie Luyendyk kept the lead at the start, as Tony Stewart conceded second place with Robby Gordon in Turn 3. Electrical issues left Davey Hamilton immediately out of contention, and John Paul Jr. took advantage of some drivers checking up, jumping from 12th to 6th before passing Mike Groff for fifth. Gordon began to reel in Luyendyk, but the lapped cars of Juan Carlos Carbonell and Brad Murphey allowed Stewart to retake second place on Lap 8. In the next lap, Johnny Parsons suffered an engine failure while running 19th. He failed to keep the control of the car and spun on his own oil, crashing in Turn 4. This was the last start of his Indy car career, which harkened all the way back to 1969.

After a long cleanup, the green flag was shown on Lap 19. Stewart's crew were unaware of the restart, which cost Stewart three spots to Gordon, Buddy Lazier and Paul Jr. Shortly after, Lazier's pace faded, dropping places with an unspecified issue that eventually left him out of the race. Michel Jourdain Jr., who had gone from 22nd to 14th at the end of Lap 2, entered the top 10, and he was eighth by Lap 28. With lapped traffic as a factor, Gordon caught Luyendyk and both drivers swapped the lead once a lap from Lap 26 to 28. After Gordon pulled ahead for the second time, Eddie Cheever, running in 18th place, was rammed from behind by Brad Murphey, who was a lap down in 26th place, and both made hard contact with the wall. Stéphan Grégoire, running 21st at the time, hit a loose tire and tried to get past between the two destroyed cars while they were still moving, but crashed with the back end of Cheever's car. Murphey had to be extricated from his car and airlifted to University Medical Center, where he underwern various surgeries for a broken right thighbone, pelvis and hip. He went on to make a successful recovery, but he would never race again in the IRL.

During the caution, John Paul Jr. made a pit stop from third, and Tony Stewart did so a few laps later as a precautionary measure, removing a punctured tire in the process. At the restart, Gordon and Luyendyk pulled away from Mike Groff, while Roberto Guerrero dropped from fourth in the order with handling issues. On Lap 55, while running in 16th place, Tyce Carlson collided with the lapped car of Carbonell, in 22nd place at the time, and crashed in Turn 2, coming to rest on the sandy surface alongside the backstraight. All of the front runners who had not yet pitted made their first pit stop on the ensuing caution, conceding the lead to John Paul Jr. over Tony Stewart. Mark Dismore had also stopped in the previous caution, and was now in fourth place between Gordon and Luyendyk. Richie Hearn gained spots over Groff and Scott Sharp, and battled with Luyendyk for fifth place after the race went back to green, both closing on Gordon and Dismore afterwards. Michel Jourdain Jr. followed suit, passing Groff and Sharp on track.

Stewart followed Paul Jr. closely in the following laps, but he was unable to make a pass. On Lap 78, just as Luyendyk was passing Dismore for fourth, Stewart's car suddenly snapped on Turn 2, crashing sideways. He suffered a broken left collarbone and neck ligament damage, being transported to University Medical Center by ambulance. With Paul and Dismore pitting during the caution, Gordon retook the lead over Luyendyk and Richie Hearn. After repelling a pass by Jourdain, Hearn became the new race leader by passing Luyendyk on Lap 93 and Gordon on Lap 100 with identical moves in the exit of Turn 4. Gordon was saving fuel, and Luyendyk took advantage two laps later. During these laps, John Paul Jr. suffered a wheel bearing failure and retired while running in seventh place, and Mike Groff had to do a green flag pit stop on Lap 104.

On Lap 107, Luyendyk caused the fifth caution of the day after crashing in Turn 1 due to another wheel bearing failure. There were six cars on the lead lap, among them Michele Alboreto in third after passing Jourdain and Sharp in the pit stops, and Johnny O'Connell in sixth place. Jourdain and Sharp would engage in battle when the race resumed, with Sharp as the early victor. On Lap 125, Stan Wattles suffered a left-rear puncture and crashed in Turn 4. He was not injured, but lost consciousness and had to be slowly extricated from his car. During this caution, Alboreto encountered a problem in his car on Lap 138 and had to pit, losing three laps as the race went back to green a lap later.

Mark Dismore was the best driver not on the lead lap in sixth place when he had the seventh crash of the day on Lap 151, being removed in a stretcher with pelvis and left hip socket fractures. The order at the top remained unchanged in the subsequent pit stops, but Gordon regained the lead over Hearn at the restart on Lap 161, just before a brief caution period for debris. Hearn went back to the lead on Lap 169, and Sharp could not join the fight as he had a wheel bearing failure on that same lap.

Gordon remained within 1.5 seconds of Hearn when, ten laps later, he suffered the fourth wheel bearing failure of the day and retired from the race. High attrition had promoted Johnny O'Connell to third, until he crashed in Turn 4 with 15 laps left due to a mechanical failure. His car went upside down on the right side, and the race was red-flagged, only for O'Connell to climb out of the car before the medical car arrived.

After a 20-minute stoppage, the race was restarted for its final 15 laps. With just two cars on the lead lap, only Michel Jourdain Jr. was in position to fight for the win, but Richie Hearn had a great restart and maintained a small gap until the end. His IRL farewell brought Hearn the only Indy car win of his career, as well as his last podium finish. For Jourdain, it would be his lone Indy car podium until the 2001 Michigan 500, and his best result until the 2003 Grand Prix of St. Petersburg, as well as his last IRL race during the Split. Coincidentally, both drivers had competed in selected CART races that season, having partaken in the IRL as a stepping stone for a full-time switch in 1997.

Mike Groff took the lead of the championship with his podium finish, and Roberto Guerrero overcame his handling issues to finish fourth in front of Michele Alboreto and Buzz Calkins, who had finished all IRL races outside the Indy 500 in the top 6 like Groff did. Calkins was tied for second in the standings with Alboreto, who also left the League in 1997. Affonso Giaffone managed to finish his first IRL race in the Top 10. Juan Carlos Carbonell saw his only IRL start ended early by a black flag on Lap 147 for spraying oil on the track, while running 35 laps down on the leaders due to his early contact with Tyce Carlson.

== Race results ==
Pos	No.	Driver	Team	Laps	Time/Retired	Grid	Laps Led	Points
1	4	(United States) Richie Hearn R	Della Penna Motorsports	200	2:36:17.345	8	90	36
2	22	(Mexico) Michel Jourdain Jr. R	Team Scandia	200	+ 1.693	22	0	33
3	10	(United States) Mike Groff	Byrd–Cunningham Racing	199	+ 1 lap	6	0	32
4	21	(Colombia) Roberto Guerrero	Pagan Racing	198	+ 2 laps	9	0	31
5	33	(Italy) Michele Alboreto R	Team Scandia	197	+ 3 laps	18	0	30
6	12	(United States) Buzz Calkins R	Bradley Motorsports	197	+ 3 laps	16	0	29
7	7	(Chile) Eliseo Salazar	Team Scandia	196	+ 4 laps	13	0	28
8	54	(United States) Robbie Buhl	Beck Motorsports	195	+ 5 laps	15	0	27
9	40	(Brazil) Marco Greco	Team Scandia/Arizona Motorsports	191	+ 9 laps	24	0	26
10	34	(Brazil) Affonso Giaffone R	Team Scandia/Arizona Motorsports	190	+ 10 laps	23	0	25
11	14	(United States) Davey Hamilton R	A. J. Foyt Enterprises	187	+ 13 laps	5	0	24
12	6	(United States) Johnny O'Connell R	Treadway Racing	183	Accident	11	3	23
13	27	(United States) Jim Guthrie R	Team Blueprint Racing	182	+ 18 laps	19	0	22
14	50	(United States) Robby Gordon	Walker Racing	179	Wheel Bearing	3	60	21
15	18	(United States) John Paul Jr.	PDM Racing	170	+ 30 laps	12	22	20
16	1	(United States) Scott Sharp	A. J. Foyt Enterprises	168	Wheel Bearing	7	0	19
17	3	(United States) Mark Dismore	Team Menard	149	Accident	10	0	18
18	30	(United States) Stan Wattles R	McCormack Motorsports	119	Accident	21	0	17
19	15	(Chile) Juan Carlos Carbonell R	Tempero/Giuffre Racing	112	Overheating	28	0	16
20	5	(Netherlands) Arie Luyendyk	Treadway Racing	106	Accident	1	25	17
21	2	(United States) Tony Stewart R	Team Menard	77	Accident	2	0	14
22	64	(United States) Johnny Unser	Project Indy	67	Wheel Bearing	20	0	13
23	28	(United States) Tyce Carlson R	PDM Racing/BRG	53	Accident	14	0	12
24	91	(United States) Buddy Lazier	Hemelgarn Racing	35	Handling	4	0	11
25	51	(United States) Eddie Cheever	Team Cheever	27	Accident	27	0	10
26	8	(France) Stéphan Grégoire R	Team Scandia	27	Accident	25	0	9
27	9	(United States) Brad Murphey R	Hemelgarn Racing	26	Accident	26	0	8
28	16	(United States) Johnny Parsons	Team Blueprint Racing	7	Accident	17	0	7

=== Race Statistics ===
- Lead changes: 10 among 5 drivers

Lap Leaders
Laps	Leader
1-25	Arie Luyendyk
26-57	Robby Gordon
58-79	John Paul Jr.
80-99	Robby Gordon
100-110	Richie Hearn
111	Johnny O'Connell
112-153	Richie Hearn
154-155	Johnny O'Connell
156-160	Richie Hearn
161-168	Robby Gordon
169-200	Richie Hearn

Cautions: 9 for 83 laps
Laps	Reason
9-18	Johnny Parsons crash
30-46	Murphey, Cheever and Grégoire crash
55-62	Tyce Carlson crash
78-87	Tony Stewart crash
107-115	Arie Luyendyk crash
125-138	Stan Wattles crash
152-160	Mark Dismore crash
162-165	Debris
185-186	Johnny O'Connell crash

== Standings after the race ==
Drivers' Championship standings

Pos	Driver	Points
1	(United States) Mike Groff	63
2=	(Italy) Michele Alboreto	62
2=	(United States) Buzz Calkins	62
4	(Colombia) Roberto Guerrero	60
5	(United States) Richie Hearn	59

- Note: Only the top five positions are included for the standings.

== Broadcasting ==
=== Radio ===
The race was carried live on the IMS Radio Network. Bob Jenkins served as chief announcer. Bob was joined in the booth by Mike King.

Covering turn two and the backstretch was Jerry Baker. Gary Lee and Vince Welch were the pit reporters.

Indianapolis Motor Speedway Radio Network
Booth Announcers	Turn Reporters	Pit/garage reporters
Chief Announcer: Bob Jenkins; Statistician/Commentary: Mike King	Turn 2/Backstretch: Jerry Baker	Gary Lee; Vince Welch

=== Television and broadcast unavailability ===
The race was carried live on television in the United States on ABC, who was the exclusive TV partner of the Indy Racing League for the five races held in 1996. Paul Page was the play-by-play announcer along former IndyCar champions Danny Sullivan and Bobby Unser in his final race as a regular TV analyst for ABC. His next and final U.S. broadcast would be at the 1997 Indianapolis 500.

During the sixth caution period of the race, caused by Stan Wattles' crash, ABC signed off their broadcast in the East Coast, as the slow, caution-filled pace had consumed the allotted TV window with around 68 laps to go, and the race couldn't be moved to ESPN or ESPN2 due to scheduling conflicts. Only a handful of moments of the remaining laps were shown on late-night news in the East Coast, including the aftermath of Johnny O'Connell's crash.

The West Coast, tape-delayed version of the race jumped ahead from Tony Stewart's crash on Lap 80 to the seventh caution period on Lap 160 for Mark Dismore's crash. As such, the green flag period between the sixth and seventh caution was not broadcast on either version. The remaining 40 laps were shown in a condensed format with key moments, although the red flag period and the laps around it were completely edited out; images of O'Connell's crash only featured his crawling escape from the mangled car.

For many years, the West Coast footage that followed the end of the East Coast broadcast was assumed lost due to its complete unavailability on either official sources or fan recordings of the race, until IndyCar's official version of the Las Vegas 500K was finally uploaded in December 2024.
