= Bobby Regester =

American racing driver

Bobby Regester (born 1956 in Boulder, Colorado) is a former driver in the Indy Racing League. He raced in the 1999-2000 seasons with two career starts. He also has multiple wins at the Pikes Peak International Hill Climb. He currently lives on Pikes Peak selling real estate in the area and driving in the annual Hillclimb in the Super Stock Car category.

On, July 21, 2007, Regester won the 2007 Pikes Peak International Hill Climb with his Super Stock Car #44, a 2005 Pontiac Sunfire with a time of 11:46.754.

Regester now works in real estate and land sales under the Mossy Oak Properties umbrella. His family-operated branch, Colorado Mountain Realty, was founded in 1983, and Regester continues to operate the business with his son, Bobby, and several other real estate agents.

== IRL IndyCar Series ==
Year	Team	Chassis	No.	Engine	1	2	3	4	5	6	7	8	9	10	11	Rank	Points	Ref
1999	Truscelli Team Racing	G-Force GF01C	26	Oldsmobile Aurora V8	WDW	PHX	CLT	INDY	TEX	PIK	ATL	DOV	PIK; 18	LSV	TEX	40th	12	
2000	Truscelli Team Racing	G-Force	33	Oldsmobile	WDW	PHX; 20	LSV	INDY	TEX	PIK	ATL	KTY	TEX			39th	10	
