= 1999 Indy Racing League =

American auto racing season

1999 Indy Racing League season
- Pep Boys Indy Racing League
- 1999 Indy Racing League

Season
- Races: 11
- Start date: January 24
- End date: October 17

Awards
- Drivers' champion: (United States) Greg Ray
- Manufacturers' Cup: (United States) Oldsmobile
- Rookie of the Year: (United States) Scott Harrington
- Indianapolis 500 winner: (Sweden) Kenny Bräck

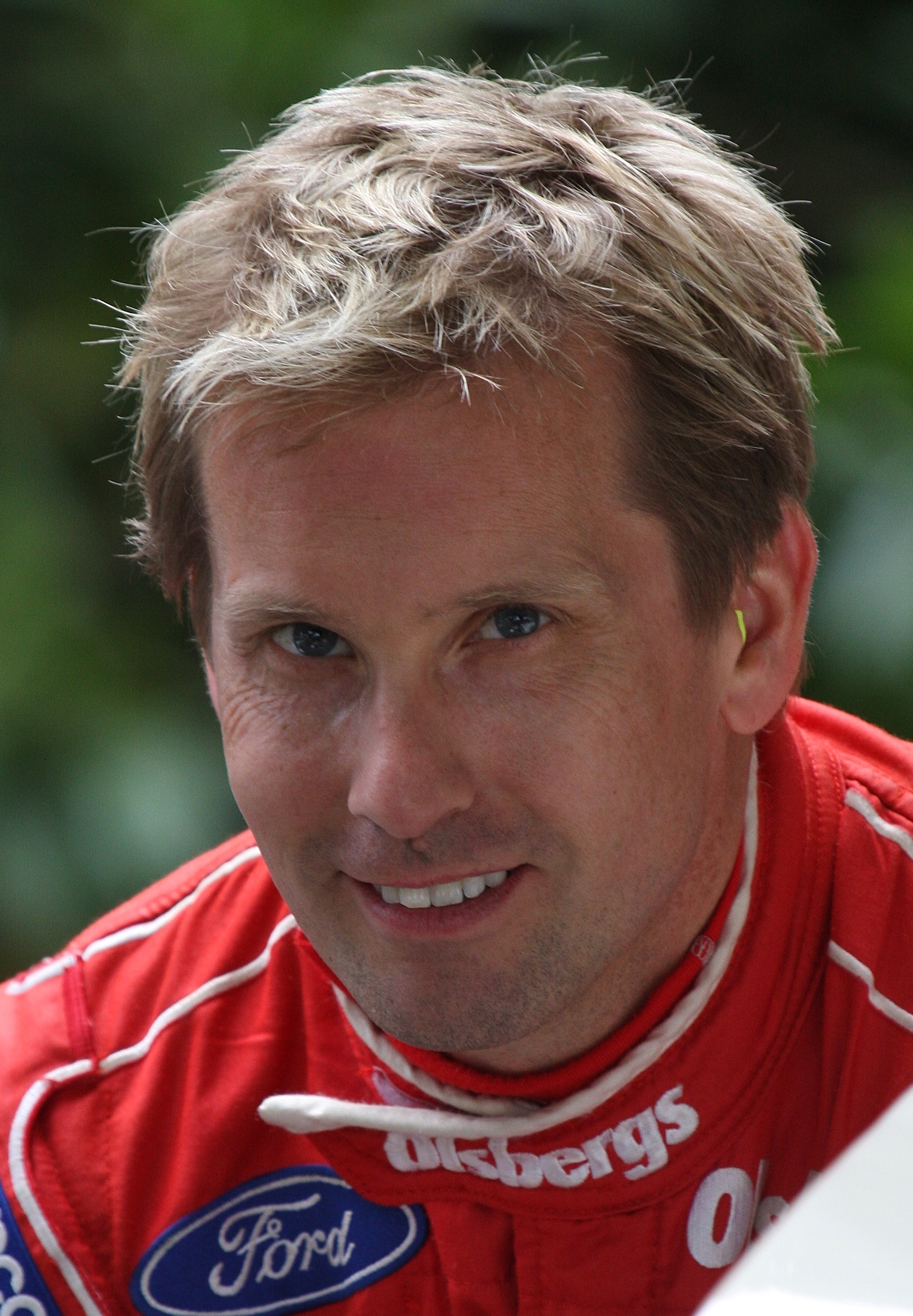
Greg Ray won his first and only Drivers' Championship while Kenny Bräck (pictured) finished second in the championship.

The 1999 Pep Boys Indy Racing League was highly competitive and parity was the order of the year. Team Menard had a very good season with their driver Greg Ray capturing 3 race wins and the series championship. This was the year before CART teams began to break ranks and jump to the IRL.

== Confirmed entries ==
Team	Chassis	Engine	Tires	No.	Drivers	Round(s)
(United States) Team Menard	Dallara	Oldsmobile	F	2	(United States) Greg Ray	All
(United States) Team Menard	Dallara	Oldsmobile	F	32	(United States) Robby Gordon	4
(United States) Brant Motorsports	Riley & Scott	Oldsmobile	G	3	(United States) Andy Michner	1–3
(United States) Brant Motorsports	Riley & Scott	Oldsmobile	G	3	(Brazil) Raul Boesel	4–7
(United States) Panther Racing	G-Force	Oldsmobile	G	4	(Canada) Scott Goodyear	All
(United States) Panther Racing	G-Force	Oldsmobile	G	43	(United States) Dave Steele	4
(United States) Treadway Racing	G-Force	Oldsmobile	F	5	(United States) Jason Leffler R	1
(United States) Treadway Racing	G-Force	Oldsmobile	F	5	(Netherlands) Arie Luyendyk	4
(United States) Treadway Racing	G-Force	Oldsmobile	F	99	(United States) Sam Schmidt	All
(United States) Nienhouse Racing	G-Force	Oldsmobile	F/G	6	(Chile) Eliseo Salazar	All
(United States) Dick Simon Racing	G-Force	Oldsmobile	F	7	(France) Stéphan Grégoire	All
(United States) Kelley Racing	Dallara	Oldsmobile	G	8	(United States) Scott Sharp	All
(United States) Kelley Racing	Dallara	Oldsmobile	G	28	(United States) Mark Dismore	All
(United States) Galles Racing	G-Force; Dallara	Oldsmobile	G	9	(United States) Davey Hamilton	1, 4–11
(United States) Byrd-Cunningham Racing	G-Force	Oldsmobile	F	10	(United States) John Paul Jr.	1–3
(United States) Byrd-Cunningham Racing	G-Force	Oldsmobile	F	10	(United States) Andy Michner	4
(United States) A. J. Foyt Enterprises	Dallara	Oldsmobile	G	11	(United States) Billy Boat	All
(United States) A. J. Foyt Enterprises	Dallara	Oldsmobile	G	14	(Sweden) Kenny Bräck	All
(United States) A. J. Foyt Enterprises	Dallara	Oldsmobile	G	41	(Brazil) Marco Greco	4
(United States) A. J. Foyt Enterprises	Dallara	Oldsmobile	G	84	(United States) Robbie Buhl	4
(United States) Bradley Motorsports	Dallara; G-Force	Oldsmobile	F	12	(United States) Buzz Calkins	All
(United States) DR/Lazier Racing	G-Force	Infiniti	G	15	(United States) Jaques Lazier R	2, 4
(United States) Phoenix Racing	G-Force	Oldsmobile	F	16	(Brazil) Marco Greco	2
(United States) Tri-Star Motorsports	Dallara	Oldsmobile	G	17	(United States) Dr. Jack Miller	4, 7
(United States) Tri-Star Motorsports	Dallara	Oldsmobile	G	17	(United States) Ronnie Johncox R	10–11
(United States) Tri-Star Motorsports	Dallara	Oldsmobile	G	22	(United States) Ronnie Johncox R	5, 7–9
(United States) Tri-Star Motorsports	Dallara	Oldsmobile	G	22	(Brazil) Gualter Salles	1
(United States) Tri-Star Motorsports	Dallara	Oldsmobile	G	22	(United States) Tony Stewart	4
(United States) Tri-Star Motorsports	Dallara	Oldsmobile	G	22	(United States) Robbie Buhl	10–11
(United States) PDM Racing	G-Force	Oldsmobile	G	18	(United States) Steve Knapp	1
(United States) PDM Racing	G-Force	Oldsmobile	G	18	(United States) Mike Borkowski R	3–4
(United States) Metro Racing	Dallara	Oldsmobile	G	19	(United States) Stan Wattles	1, 3–5
(United States) Blueprint-Immke Racing	Dallara	Oldsmobile	F	20	(United States) Tyce Carlson	All
(United States) Blueprint-Immke Racing	G-Force	Oldsmobile	F	27	(Sweden) Niclas Jönsson	10–11
(United States) Pagan Racing	Dallara	Oldsmobile	G	21	(United States) Jeff Ward	2–11
(United States) Barnhart Motorsports	Dallara	Oldsmobile	G	25	(United States) Davey Hamilton	2–3
(United States) Truscelli Team Racing	G-Force	Oldsmobile	G	26	(United States) Bobby Regester R	9
(United States) Truscelli Team Racing	G-Force	Oldsmobile	G	33	(United States) Brian Tyler	1
(United States) Truscelli Team Racing	G-Force	Oldsmobile	G	33	(Brazil) Roberto Moreno	2–4
(United States) Truscelli Team Racing	G-Force	Oldsmobile	G	33	(United States) Jaques Lazier R	5–11
(United States) McCormack Motorsports	G-Force	Oldsmobile	F	30	(Brazil) Raul Boesel	1–3
(United States) McCormack Motorsports	G-Force	Oldsmobile	F	30	(United States) Jimmy Kite	4–9
(United States) McCormack Motorsports	G-Force	Oldsmobile	F	30	(United States) Willy T. Ribbs	10
(United States) McCormack Motorsports	G-Force	Oldsmobile	F	30	(United States) John Paul Jr.	11
(United States) McCormack Motorsports	G-Force	Oldsmobile	F	31	(United States) Nick Firestone	4
(United States) Coulson Racing	G-Force	Oldsmobile	F	34	(United States) Jim Guthrie	4
(United States) ISM Racing	G-Force	Oldsmobile	G	35	(United States) Jeff Ward	1
(United States) ISM Racing	G-Force	Oldsmobile	G	35	(United States) Steve Knapp	2–7
(United States) ISM Racing	G-Force	Oldsmobile	G	36	(United States) Brian Tyler	4
(United States) Team Xtreme	Dallara	Oldsmobile	F/G	42	(United States) John Hollansworth Jr. R	All
(United States) Team Xtreme	Dallara	Infiniti	F/G	46	(United States) Mike Groff	4
(Canada) Mid America Motorsports	Dallara	Oldsmobile	F	43	(Canada) Doug Didero	11
(United States) Sinden Racing	Dallara	Infiniti	F	44	(United States) Robbie Buhl	1–3
(United States) Team Pelfrey	Dallara	Oldsmobile	F	48	(United States) Sarah Fisher R	11
(United States) Team Pelfrey	Dallara	Oldsmobile	F	81	(United States) Robby Unser	All
(United States) Team Pelfrey	Dallara	Oldsmobile	F	90	(United States) Lyn St. James	4
(United States) Cobb Racing	G-Force	Infiniti	F	50	(Colombia) Roberto Guerrero	1–2, 4–5
(United States) Cobb Racing	G-Force	Infiniti	F	96	(United States) Jeret Schroeder	4
(United States) Team Cheever	Dallara	Oldsmobile; Infiniti	G	51	(United States) Eddie Cheever	All
(United States) Team Cheever	Dallara	Oldsmobile; Infiniti	G	52	(Belgium) Wim Eyckmans R	4
(United States) Beck Motorsports	Dallara	Oldsmobile	F	54	(Japan) Hideshi Matsuda	4
(United States) Conti Racing	Dallara	Oldsmobile	F	55	(United States) Robby McGehee R	3–11
(United States) Harrington Motorsports	Dallara	Infiniti; Oldsmobile	F	66	(United States) Scott Harrington R	All
(United States) Hemelgarn Racing	Dallara	Oldsmobile	G	91	(United States) Buddy Lazier	All
(United States) Hemelgarn Racing	Dallara	Oldsmobile	G	92	(United States) Johnny Unser	3–7, 10–11
(United States) Cahill Racing	Dallara; G-Force	Oldsmobile	F	98	(United States) Donnie Beechler	All

== Schedule ==
Rnd	Date	Race Name	Track	Location
1	January 24	TransWorld Diversified Services Indy 200	Walt Disney World Speedway	Bay Lake, Florida
2	March 28	MCI WorldCom 200	Phoenix International Raceway	Avondale, Arizona
3	May 1	VisionAire 500K	Lowe's Motor Speedway	Concord, North Carolina
4	May 30	Indianapolis 500	Indianapolis Motor Speedway	Speedway, Indiana
5	June 12	Longhorn 500	Texas Motor Speedway	Fort Worth, Texas
6	June 27	Radisson 200	Pikes Peak International Raceway	Fountain, Colorado
7	July 17	Kobalt Mechanics Tools 500	Atlanta Motor Speedway	Hampton, Georgia
8	August 1	MBNA Mid-Atlantic 200	Dover International Speedway	Dover, Delaware
9	August 29	Colorado Indy 200	Pikes Peak International Raceway	Fountain, Colorado
10	September 26	Vegas.com 500	Las Vegas Motor Speedway	Las Vegas, Nevada
11	October 17	Mall.com 500	Texas Motor Speedway	Fort Worth, Texas

== Results ==
All races were run on oval speedways.

Rd.	Race	Pole position	Fastest lap	Most laps led	Race winner			
Rd.	Race	Pole position	Fastest lap	Most laps led	Driver	Team	Chassis	Engine
1	Walt Disney World	(United States) Scott Sharp	(United States) Scott Sharp	(United States) Scott Sharp	(United States) Eddie Cheever	Team Cheever	Dallara	Oldsmobile
2	Phoenix	(United States) Greg Ray	(Canada) Scott Goodyear	(Canada) Scott Goodyear	(Canada) Scott Goodyear	Panther Racing	G-Force	Oldsmobile
3	Charlotte	(United States) Greg Ray	Race abandoned after 79 laps due to the deaths of three spectators					
4	Indianapolis	(Netherlands) Arie Luyendyk	(United States) Greg Ray	(Sweden) Kenny Bräck	(Sweden) Kenny Bräck	A. J. Foyt Enterprises	Dallara	Oldsmobile
5	Texas 1	(United States) Mark Dismore	(United States) Sam Schmidt	(United States) Greg Ray	(Canada) Scott Goodyear	Panther Racing	G-Force	Oldsmobile
6	Pikes Peak 1	(United States) Greg Ray	(United States) Mark Dismore	(United States) Greg Ray	(United States) Greg Ray	Team Menard	Dallara	Oldsmobile
7	Atlanta	(United States) Billy Boat	(United States) Jaques Lazier	(Canada) Scott Goodyear	(United States) Scott Sharp	Kelley Racing	Dallara	Oldsmobile
8	Dover	(United States) Mark Dismore	(United States) Mark Dismore	(United States) Mark Dismore	(United States) Greg Ray	Team Menard	Dallara	Oldsmobile
9	Pikes Peak 2	(United States) Greg Ray	(United States) Buddy Lazier	(United States) Greg Ray	(United States) Greg Ray	Team Menard	Dallara	Oldsmobile
10	Las Vegas	(United States) Sam Schmidt	(United States) Tyce Carlson	(Sweden) Kenny Bräck	(United States) Sam Schmidt	Treadway Racing	G-Force	Oldsmobile
11	Texas 2	(United States) Greg Ray	(Canada) Scott Goodyear	(Canada) Scott Goodyear	(United States) Mark Dismore	Kelley Racing	Dallara	Oldsmobile

== Race summaries ==
=== TransWorld Diversified Services Indy 200 ===
The TransWorld Diversified Services Indy 200 was held on January 24 at Walt Disney World Speedway. Scott Sharp qualified on the pole position. The race was broadcast on ABC.

Top 10 results

1. 51 - Eddie Cheever
2. 4 - Scott Goodyear
3. 35 - Jeff Ward
4. 8 - Scott Sharp
5. 30 - Raul Boesel
6. 28 - Mark Dismore
7. 18 - Steve Knapp
8. 9 - Davey Hamilton
9. 11 - Billy Boat
10. 91 - Buddy Lazier
- Failed to qualify: 6 - Eliseo Salazar

=== MCI WorldCom 200 ===
The MCI WorldCom 200 was held on March 28 at Phoenix International Raceway. Greg Ray qualified on the pole position. The race was broadcast on Fox Sports Net.

Top ten results

1. 4 - Scott Goodyear
2. 21 - Jeff Ward
3. 44 - Robbie Buhl
4. 11 - Billy Boat
5. 66 - Scott Harrington
6. 33 - Roberto Moreno
7. 28 - Mark Dismore
8. 8 - Scott Sharp
9. 99 - Sam Schmidt
10. 7 - Stéphan Grégoire
- Goodyear's first IndyCar win since the 1994 Marlboro 500 at Michigan International Speedway, and his first in IRL competition.
- Prior to this race, Ward left ISM Racing to drive for Pagan Racing.

=== VisionAire 500K ===
The VisionAire 500K was on held May 1 at Lowe's Motor Speedway. Greg Ray qualified on the pole position. The race was broadcast on Speedvision.

Top 10 on lap 79:

1. 2 - Greg Ray
2. 4 - Scott Goodyear
3. 51 - Eddie Cheever
4. 99 - Sam Schmidt
5. 98 - Donnie Beechler
6. 8 - Scott Sharp
7. 91 - Buddy Lazier
8. 28 - Mark Dismore
9. 55 - Robby McGehee
10. 14 - Kenny Bräck
- Failed to qualify: 35 - Steve Knapp
- On lap 62, Stan Wattles crashed after suffering a suspension failure. John Paul Jr. made contact, sending Wattles' right rear wheel and tire assembly into the grandstand. Scott Harrington also spun in the incident.
- The race continued under caution, with Lazier initially leading until he had to make a pit stop to replace a punctured tire, giving Ray the lead. On lap 79, the race was stopped, so that medical helicopters could land.
- The race was stopped permanently by track general manager Humpy Wheeler when it was announced that 3 spectators were killed. As a result, fans and participants were offered refunds.
- The race was scratched from the record books, due to the fact that it did not reach the official race distance of 105 laps (the halfway point plus one lap, unlike the FIA Code, which is simply making it to the start of the fourth lap).
- Due to this race and a similar incident (where 3 people were killed) at the CART 1998 U.S. 500 at Michigan International Speedway, wheel tethers were added to open-wheel cars.
- This would be the final IndyCar race at Charlotte.

=== Indianapolis 500 ===
The Indianapolis 500 was held on May 30 at Indianapolis Motor Speedway. Arie Luyendyk qualified on the pole position.

Top 10 results

1. 14 - Kenny Bräck
2. 21 - Jeff Ward
3. 11 - Billy Boat
4. 32 - Robby Gordon
5. 55 - Robby McGehee
6. 84 - Robbie Buhl
7. 91 - Buddy Lazier
8. 81 - Robby Unser
9. 22 - Tony Stewart
10. 54 - Hideshi Matsuda
- Failed to qualify: 7 - Stéphan Grégoire, 10 - John Paul Jr., 10 - Andy Michner, 15 - Jaques Lazier, 15 - Troy Reiger, 18 - Mike Borkowski, 18 - Ronnie Johncox, 19 - Stan Wattles, 34 - Nick Firestone, 34 - Jim Guthrie, 36 - Brian Tyler, 36 - Vincenzo Sospiri, 43 - Dave Steele, 46 - Mike Groff, 66 - Scott Harrington, and 90 - Lyn St. James
- Until 2006, this race had the latest pass for the lead in Indianapolis 500 history when Gordon pitted on Lap 199, and Bräck took the lead in Turn 4.
- Combined, Arie Luyendyk and Greg Ray led 95 laps. Luyendyk crashed while attempting to lap Tyce Carlson on Lap 118, and during the ensuing caution, Ray was hit by Mark Dismore while exiting his pit stall.
- The day before the race, the Motorola 300 at Gateway International Raceway for the FedEx CART Championship Series was held. Gordon and Roberto Moreno competed in the race (Gordon competed full-time in CART and did Indianapolis as a one-off for Team Menard, due to Menards being his sponsor in the series, and Moreno was hired as an injury replacement at PacWest Racing for Mark Blundell, while concurrently driving for Truscelli Racing in the IRL). Moreno finished 4th and Gordon 27th due to a crash.
- Stewart, who moved to the NASCAR Winston Cup Series, did Double Duty by competing at Indianapolis and the Coca-Cola 600 at Lowe's Motor Speedway. He finished 9th at Indianapolis, 4 laps down, and 4th at Charlotte on the lead lap, despite being moved to the rear of the field due to missing the drivers meeting.
- Rookie of the Year McGehee had an incident during a pit stop where a pit crew member hit the ground, but survived.
- This race was planned on being Luyendyk's final race. However, he returned to race part-time from 2001 to 2003.
- 4 drivers named either Robby or Robbie finished in the Top 10.

=== Longhorn 500 ===
The Longhorn 500 was held on June 12 at Texas Motor Speedway. Mark Dismore qualified on the pole position. The race was broadcast on Fox Sports Net.

Top 10 results

1. 4 - Scott Goodyear
2. 2 - Greg Ray
3. 99 - Sam Schmidt
4. 7 - Stéphan Grégoire
5. 6 - Eliseo Salazar
6. 81 - Robby Unser
7. 9 - Davey Hamilton
8. 28 - Mark Dismore
9. 12 - Buzz Calkins
10. 8 - Scott Sharp
- Failed to qualify: 19 - Stan Wattles and 50 - Roberto Guerrero
- Ray entered the race 20th in points and left 8th.

=== Radisson 200 ===
The Radisson 200 was held on June 27 at Pikes Peak International Raceway. Greg Ray qualified on the pole position. The race was broadcast on Fox Sports Net.

Top 10 results

1. 2 - Greg Ray
2. 99 - Sam Schmidt
3. 9 - Davey Hamilton
4. 51 - Eddie Cheever
5. 91 - Buddy Lazier
6. 81 - Robby Unser
7. 14 - Kenny Bräck
8. 8 - Scott Sharp
9. 21 - Jeff Ward
10. 33 - Jaques Lazier
- Ray's first IndyCar win.
- Ray led 109 of 200 laps on his way to victory. Schmidt led the other 91 laps.

=== Kobalt Mechanics Tools 500 ===
The Kobalt Mechanics Tools 500 was held on July 17 at Atlanta Motor Speedway. Billy Boat qualified on the pole position. The race was broadcast on Fox Sports Net.

Top 10 results

1. 8 - Scott Sharp
2. 81 - Robby Unser
3. 14 - Kenny Bräck
4. 6 - Eliseo Salazar
5. 12 - Buzz Calkins
6. 51 - Eddie Cheever
7. 9 - Davey Hamilton
8. 98 - Donnie Beechler
9. 30 - Jimmy Kite
10. 11 - Billy Boat
- Unser's best IndyCar finish.

=== MBNA Mid-Atlantic 200 ===
The MBNA Mid-Atlantic 200 was held on August 1 at Dover Downs International Speedway. Mark Dismore qualified on the pole position. The race was broadcast on Fox.

Top 10 results

1. 2 - Greg Ray
2. 91 - Buddy Lazier
3. 14 - Kenny Bräck
4. 11 - Billy Boat
5. 99 - Sam Schmidt
6. 66 - Scott Harrington
7. 33 - Jaques Lazier
8. 12 - Buzz Calkins
9. 55 - Robby McGehee
10. 98 - Donnie Beechler

=== Colorado Indy 200 ===
The Colorado Indy 200 was held on August 29 at Pikes Peak International Raceway. Greg Ray qualified on the pole position. The race was broadcast on Fox Sports Net.

Top 10 results

1. 2 - Greg Ray
2. 9 - Davey Hamilton
3. 28 - Mark Dismore
4. 91 - Buddy Lazier
5. 99 - Sam Schmidt
6. 66 - Scott Harrington
7. 55 - Robby McGehee
8. 30 - Jimmy Kite
9. 81 - Robby Unser
10. 14 - Kenny Bräck
- This would be the final race aired on Fox. After this race, ESPN/ABC purchased the rights for the remaining two races.

=== Vegas.com 500 ===
The Vegas.com 500 was held on September 26 at Las Vegas Motor Speedway. Sam Schmidt qualified on the pole position. The race was broadcast on ESPN.

Top 10 results

1. 99- Sam Schmidt
2. 14- Kenny Bräck
3. 22- Robbie Buhl
4. 8- Scott Sharp
5. 12- Buzz Calkins
6. 55- Robby McGehee
7. 33- Jaques Lazier
8. 7- Stephan Gregoire
9. 20- Tyce Carlson
10. 21- Jeff Ward
- Entering the season-finale, Greg Ray led Bräck by 15 points, Schmidt by 30 points, Sharp by 46 points, and Scott Goodyear by 48 points.
- Schmidt's only IndyCar win.

=== Mall.com 500 ===
The Mall.com 500 was held on October 17 at Texas Motor Speedway. Greg Ray qualified on the pole position. The race was broadcast on ABC.

Top 10 results

1. 28 - Mark Dismore
2. 9 - Davey Hamilton
3. 2 - Greg Ray
4. 51 - Eddie Cheever
5. 42 - John Hollansworth Jr.
6. 66 - Scott Harrington
7. 33 - Jaques Lazier
8. 12 - Buzz Calkins
9. 11 - Billy Boat
10. 91 - Buddy Lazier
- Failed to qualify: 27 - Niclas Jönsson and 92 - Johnny Unser
- Points leader Ray was the only championship eligible driver to finish in the top 5 and top 10, finishing 3rd. Scott Goodyear finished 23rd due to a crash, Scott Sharp finished 19th due to an engine failure, Sam Schmidt finished 22nd due to a separate crash, and Kenny Bräck finished 16th, 22 laps down.
- There were several changes in the top 10 in points following this race, due to 3rd being separated from 10th by 31 points. Race winner Dismore moved up from 11th to 3rd, Jeff Ward (at one time the points leader) dropped from 7th to 11th, Sharp dropped from 4th to 8th, Goodyear dropped from 5th to 9th, and Hamilton moved up from 7th to 4th.
- Dismore's only IndyCar win.
- Schmidt's final IndyCar race. His career would end due to a testing crash at Walt Disney World Speedway in January 2000 that left him paralyzed.
- Sarah Fisher made her IndyCar debut in this race, becoming the first woman since Lyn St. James at the 1997 Indianapolis 500 to start an IndyCar race. She started 17th, but finished 25th due to a broken timing chain.

== Points standings ==
Pos	Driver	WDW	PHX	CHA	INDY	TMS1	PPR1	ATL	DOV	PPR2	LVS	TMS2	Pts
1	(United States) Greg Ray	21	**21**	**C^{1}**	21	2*	**1***	23	1	**1***	21	**3**	293
2	(Sweden) Kenny Bräck	22	24	C^{1}	1*	13	7	3	3	10	2*	16	256
3	(United States) Mark Dismore	6	7	C^{1}	16	**8**	21	17	**15***	3	20	1	240
4	(United States) Davey Hamilton	8	27	C^{1}	11	7	3	7	23	2	13	2	237
5	(United States) Sam Schmidt	27	9	C^{1}	30	3	2	22	5	5	**1**	22	233
6	(United States) Buddy Lazier	10	18	C^{1}	7	14	5	21	2	4	11	10	224
7	(United States) Eddie Cheever	1	17	C^{1}	18	16	4	6	21	11	17	4	222
8	(United States) Scott Sharp	**4***	8	C^{1}	28	10	8	1	22	22	4	19	220
9	(Canada) Scott Goodyear	2	1*	C^{1}	27	1	12	16*	17	21	25	23*	217
10	(United States) Robby Unser	15	26	C^{1}	8	6	6	2	12	9	16	14	209
11	(United States) Jeff Ward	3	2	C^{1}	2	18	9	26	13	23	10	21	206
12	(United States) Billy Boat	9	4	C^{1}	3	24	24	**10**	4	13	22	9	204
13	(United States) Buzz Calkins	17	14	C^{1}	19	9	14	5	8	15	5	8	201
14	(United States) Scott Harrington RY	25	5	C^{1}	DNQ	DNS	19	15	6	6	14	6	165
15	(France) Stéphan Grégoire	16	10	C^{1}	DNQ	4	11	24	14	14	8	15	162
16	(United States) Robby McGehee R			C^{1}	5	19	Wth	14	9	7	6	12	156
17	(United States) John Hollansworth Jr. R	19	15	C^{1}	13	20	16	19	19	16	19	5	146
18	(United States) Jaques Lazier R		DNS		DNQ	22	10	12	7	12	7	7	144
19	(United States) Tyce Carlson	12	23	C^{1}	14	21	23	20	11	17	9	13	139
20	(Chile) Eliseo Salazar	DNQ	20	C^{1}	33	5	20	4	18	19	12	17	137
21	(United States) Donnie Beechler	26	11	C^{1}	29	17	22	8	10	20	18	11	130
22	(United States) Robbie Buhl	20	3	C^{1}	6						3	24	114
23	(Brazil) Raul Boesel	5	19	C^{1}	12	23	18	11					98
24	(United States) Jimmy Kite				24	25	15	9	16	8			86
25	(United States) Steve Knapp	7	25		26	12	17	27					69
26	(United States) Ronnie Johncox R					11		25	20	24	15	26	59
27	(United States) Johnny Unser			C^{1}	32	15	13	13			23		57
28	(United States) John Paul Jr.	11	22	C^{1}	Wth							18	39
29	(Brazil) Roberto Moreno		6	C^{1}	20								38
30	(Colombia) Roberto Guerrero	13	16		25								36
31	(United States) Robby Gordon				4								32
32	(United States) Andy Michner	18	13	C^{1}	DNQ								29
33	(United States) Tony Stewart				9								22
34	(Japan) Hideshi Matsuda				10								20
35	(United States) Stan Wattles	24		C^{1}	17								19
36	(Brazil) Marco Greco		12		DNQ								18
37	(United States) Brian Tyler	14			DNQ								16
38	(United States) Jeret Schroeder R				15								15
39	(United States) Dr. Jack Miller				31			18					13
40	(United States) Bobby Regester R									18			12
41	(Netherlands) Arie Luyendyk				**22**								11
42	(Canada) Doug Didero R											20	10
43	(Sweden) Niclas Jönsson R										24	DNS	9
44	(Brazil) Gualter Salles	23											7
45	(Belgium) Wim Eyckmans R				23								7
46	(United States) Sarah Fisher R											25	5
47	(United States) Willy T. Ribbs										26		4
48	(United States) Jason Leffler R	28											2
–	(United States) Mike Borkowski			C^{1}	DNQ								0
–	(United States) Nick Firestone				DNQ								0
–	(United States) Mike Groff				DNQ								0
–	(United States) Jim Guthrie				DNQ								0
–	(United States) Lyn St. James				DNQ								0
–	(United States) Dave Steele				Wth								0
Pos	Driver	WDW	PHX	CHA	INDY	TMS1	PPR1	ATL	DOV	PPR2	LVS	TMS2	Pts

Color	Result
Gold	Winner
Silver	2nd place
Bronze	3rd place
Green	4th & 5th place
Light Blue	6th–10th place
Dark Blue	Finished (Outside Top 10)
Purple	Did not finish (Ret)
Red	Did not qualify (DNQ)
Brown	Withdrawn (Wth)
Black	Disqualified (DSQ)
White	Did not start (DNS)
Blank	Did not participate (DNP)
Blank	Not competing

**In-line notation**
**Bold**	Pole position (2 points)
Italics	Ran fastest race lap
*	Led most race laps (1 point)
DNS	Any driver who qualifies but does not start (DNS), earns all the points had they taken part.
RY	Rookie of the Year
R	Rookie

^{1} The 1999 VisionAire 500K at Charlotte was cancelled after 79 laps due to spectator fatalities.

- Ties in points broken by number of wins, followed by number of 2nds, 3rds, etc., and then by number of pole positions, followed by number of times qualified 2nd, etc.

Additional points were awarded to the pole winner (3 points), the second best qualifier (2 points), the third best qualifier (1 point), and to the driver leading the most laps (2 points). This is regarded to be the best race of 1999 by most people.

== Bibliography ==
- Johnson, Paul, ed. (1999). Indy Review 1999, Volume 9: Complete Coverage of the 1999 Indy Racing League Season. St. Paul, MN: MBI Publishing Company. ISBN 978-0-7603-0774-8.

== See also ==
- 1999 Indianapolis 500
- 1999 Indy Lights season
- 1999 CART season
- 1999 Toyota Atlantic Championship season
- http://champcarstats.com/year/1999i.htm
- http://media.indycar.com/pdf/2011/IICS_2011_Historical_Record_Book_INT6.pdf (p. 135–136)
