= Mike Borkowski =

American racing driver (born 1973)

- Born: May 6, 1973 (age 53); The Bronx, New York, U.S.

NASCAR O'Reilly Auto Parts Series career
- 9 races run over 2 years
- Best finish: 60th (2000)
- First race: 1999 Sam's Town 250 (Memphis)
- Last race: 2000 Busch (Loudon)
Wins	Top tens	Poles
0	1	0

NASCAR FedEx Freight Truck Series career
- 1 race run over 1 year
- Best finish: 97th (1997)
- First race: 1997 O'Reilly Auto Parts 275 (Topeka)
Wins	Top tens	Poles
0	0	0

Previous series
- 2010, 2002–2008 2004 1999–2000 1998–1999 1995, 1998 1997 1996 1990–1995 1990 1989 1981–1988: Grand-Am ALMS; NASCAR Busch Series; USRRC; Indy Lights; Trans-Am; IMSA; SCCA; Bertil Roos; Spenard David; Quarter Midgets

Championship titles
- 2004 1994 1992 1990 1990 1985, 1981–1983: 12 Hours of Sebring Winner LMP2; SCCA Pro Formula 2000; SCCA Pro Sports 2000; SCCA NESRR; SCCA NARR; New England States Quarter Midget

Awards
- 1999 1997 1997 1994 1991: U.S. F2000 Hall of Fame; Trans-Am Rookie of the Year; Auto Racing Writers & Broadcasters All America Team; Team USA Scholarship; SCCA Pro Sports 2000 Rookie of the Year

Michael John Borkowski (born May 6, 1973) is an American race car driver. Borkowski has raced in a variety of cars and series, is experienced in both road and oval racing, but is best known for his victory over Tommy Kendall in the 1997 Trans-Am Series race at Pikes Peak International Raceway, ending Kendall's historic run of eleven consecutive race wins. Borkowski also went on to win the final race of the 1997 Trans-Am Series at the Reno Grand Prix.

== Early career ==
Borkowski grew up in the small town of Middlebury, Connecticut and began racing Quarter Midgets at the Silver City Quarter Midget Club in Meriden, Connecticut — the same club as race car drivers Jeff Simmons, Erin Crocker, Joey Logano, and renowned Indycar engineer Chris Simmons. Borkowski competed in Quarter Midgets from 1981 to 1988, winning four New England States Championships in the process.

At the age of sixteen, Borkowski made the transition to full size cars competing in the 1989 Spenard David School and 1990 Bertil Roos School Racing Series, winning three out of seven races, two pole positions, and finishing on the podium five times. In 1990, he also competed in the SCCA's New England States Road Racing and North Atlantic Road Racing Championships, dominating both Championships with seven wins, two track records, seven pole positions, and eight fastest race laps.

Still a senior in high school at the Taft School in Watertown, Connecticut, Borkowski turned pro in 1991, competing in SCCA's Pro Sports 2000 Series, winning Rookie of the Year. Borkowski continued his winning ways in the 1992 and 1993 Pro Sports 2000 Championships, capturing five wins, eleven podiums, nine track records, four pole positions along with the 1993 Series Championship.

In 1992, Borkowski had a unique opportunity to co-pilot the Oldsmobile Aerotech in a grueling test of endurance and speed at the Firestone Test Track in Fort Stockton, Texas, setting multiple FIA World Speed Records in the process.

1994 saw the transition for Borkowski to open-wheel race cars. He was awarded the Team USA Scholarship to compete at the legendary Formula Ford Festival at Brands Hatch. In 1994, he also competed in and won the SCCA Pro Formula 2000 Championship, winning four of six races entered in a seven race series, four pole positions, finishing on the podium in all six starts, and setting six track records.

== Indy Lights, Indycar, and Sportscars ==
In 1995, Borkowski ran a limited schedule in Indy Lights with Team Medlin, competing and finishing in the top ten in all six races run with a best finish of fourth at Belle Isle Park in Detroit.

In 1996, Borkowski was tapped to run his first 24 Hours of Daytona as factory driver for the #1 Oldsmobile Aurora GTS-1 alongside drivers Irv Hoerr, Brian Cunningham, and Darin Brassfield. The team was leading in class when the car caught fire at the 9 hour mark, preventing the car and team from finishing the race. In 1996, Borkowski was also selected for the inaugural Team Green Academy, however, was unable to participate due to being signed by Team Rahal Letterman.

1997 was a breakout year for Borkowski's professional career, competing for Team Rahal Letterman in partnership with Tom Gloy Racing in the Trans-Am Series, collecting the two aforementioned wins, third in the overall championship, and Rookie of the Year honors.

In 1998, Borkowski returned to Indy Lights under the Team Rahal Letterman banner but with limited success, collecting only one top five finish at Vancouver in fourteen starts. In 1998, Borkowski also ran his second 24 Hours of Daytona, campaigning a Tom Gloy fielded GT1 Ford Mustang Cobra alongside drivers Tony Kanaan and Robbie Buhl, finishing third in class.

In 1999, Borkowski qualified and raced in one Indy Racing League event at the Charlotte Motor Speedway, however the race was stopped prior to completion after crash debris entered the grandstands killing three spectators. Borkowski also made his one and only attempt at qualifying for the Indy 500 driving for PDM Racing but never got his chance when rain cut short qualifying on Bubble Day.

Later in his career, Borkowski returned full-time to driving sports GT and prototype race cars in the Rolex Sports Car Series. In 2003, he was hired by legendary Brumos Racing to campaign a Porsche powered Daytona Prototype alongside David Donohue in the inaugural season for the Rolex Series and Daytona Prototype class. Together Borkowski and Donohue won three races, stood on the podium ten times, and finished second overall in the series championship. Between 2003 and 2010, Borkowski competed in both the Rolex Series' Daytona Prototype and GT classes for various teams including Speedsource, Michael Shank Racing, Playboy Racing, and Stevenson Motorsports. During this period he drove a variety of cars with a variety of co-drivers including Daytona Prototype's (with Paul Tracy, Kenny Wilden, and Brian Friselle), a Nissan 350Z and BMW M6 (with Tommy Constantine), and a Chevrolet Camaro GT.R (with Matt Bell).

In 2004, Borkowski also piloted a Lola Nissan LMP2 prototype in the 12 Hours of Sebring with co-drivers Ian James and John Macaluso, winning their class.

== NASCAR ==
Borkowski had a limited NASCAR career, competing in one Winston West Series, one Busch North Series, one Craftsman Truck Series, and nine Busch Series events between 1999 and 2003. His best finish was a tenth at Talladega Superspeedway in 2000 driving for the now defunct Bill Davis Racing. After causing four crashes in one race, Borkowski was fired. First crashing Lyndon Amick who faked him out on throwing his helmet, then crashing Jason Jarrett who then threw his knee pads at Borkowski's car under caution. Then with nine laps to go, he crashed Ted Christopher and Tony Raines in one crash and Jay Sauter and Michael Ritch on the last lap at the Busch 200 at New Hampshire Motor Speedway, on the same weekend that Adam Petty was killed in a crash. Bill Davis Racing released him after this event due to pressure from his sponsor. On November 3, 2000, AT&T filed a federal breach-of-contract lawsuit against Borkowski, Bill Davis Racing, and ESBG Marketing in a Denver federal court, claiming that his inicidents had harmed the brand and that the company demanded that the team paid back $600,000 in which AT&T had invested in sponsorship for the team. The lawsuit also asserted that Borkowski was criticized by officials, television commentators, and other drivers following the incident. In 2001, AT&T settled the lawsuit out of court with Borkowski.

== Motorsports career results ==
=== SCCA National Championship Runoffs ===
Year	Track	Car	Engine	Class	Finish	Start	Status
1994	Mid-Ohio	Van Diemen RF94	Ford	Formula Continental	3	3	Running

=== IndyCar Series ===
(key) (Races in bold indicate pole position)

Year	Team	No.	Chassis	Engine	1	2	3	4	5	6	7	8	9	10	11	Rank	Points	Ref
1999	PDM Racing	18	G-Force GF01C	Oldsmobile Aurora V8	WDW	PHX	CLT; C^{1}	INDY; DNQ	TXS	PPIR	ATL	DOV	PPIR	LVS	TXS	NC	-	

^{1} Borkowski qualified 24th for the 1999 VisionAire 500K at Charlotte, however, the race was cancelled after 79 laps due to spectator fatalities. The race was subsequently stricken from record.

==== Indy 500 results ====
Year	Team	Chassis	Engine	Start	Finish
1999	PDM Racing	G-Force	Oldsmobile	DNQ^{1}	N/A

^{1} On Bubble Day, Borkowski was in line to qualify Tony Stewart's backup car but never got the chance due to rain washing out the final minutes of qualifying.

=== NASCAR ===
(key) (Bold – Pole position awarded by qualifying time. Italics – Pole position earned by points standings or practice time. * – Most laps led.)

==== Winston Cup Series ====
NASCAR Winston Cup Series results
Year	Team	No.	Make	1	2	3	4	5	6	7	8	9	10	11	12	13	14	15	16	17	18	19	20	21	22	23	24	25	26	27	28	29	30	31	32	33	34	NWCC	Pts	Ref
1999	Midgley Motorsports	09	Pontiac	DAY	CAR	LVS	ATL	DAR	TEX	BRI	MAR	TAL	CAL	RCH	CLT	DOV	MCH	POC	SON; DNQ	DAY	NHA	POC	IND	GLN	MCH	BRI	DAR	RCH	NHA	DOV	MAR	CLT	TAL	CAR	PHO	HOM	ATL	NA	-	

==== Busch Series ====
NASCAR Busch Series results
Year	Team	No.	Make	1	2	3	4	5	6	7	8	9	10	11	12	13	14	15	16	17	18	19	20	21	22	23	24	25	26	27	28	29	30	31	32	NBSC	Pts	Ref
1999	Bill Davis Racing	02	Pontiac	DAY	CAR	LVS	ATL	DAR	TEX	NSV	BRI	TAL	CAL	NHA	RCH	NZH	CLT	DOV	SBO	GLN	MLW	MYB	PPR	GTY	IRP	MCH	BRI	DAR	RCH	DOV	CLT	CAR; DNQ	MEM; 32	PHO	HOM	118th	67	
2000	Bill Davis Racing	20	Pontiac	DAY; 22	CAR; 40	LVS; 40	ATL; 28	DAR; 43	BRI; DNQ	TEX	NSV; 42	TAL; 10	CAL	RCH	NHA; 21	CLT	DOV	SBO	MYB	GLN	MLW	NZH	PPR	GTY	IRP	MCH	BRI	DAR	RCH	DOV	CLT	CAR	MEM	PHO	HOM	60th	567	

==== Craftsman Truck Series ====
NASCAR Craftsman Truck Series results
Year	Team	No.	Make	1	2	3	4	5	6	7	8	9	10	11	12	13	14	15	16	17	18	19	20	21	22	23	24	25	NCTC	Pts	Ref
1999	Mike Borkowski	09	Chevy	HOM	PHO	EVG	MMR	MAR	MEM	PPR	I70	BRI	TEX	PIR	GLN	MLW	NSV	NZH	MCH	NHA	IRP	GTY	HPT; 22	RCH	LVS	LVL	TEX	CAL	97th	97	

=== ARCA Bondo/Mar-Hyde Series ===
(key) (Bold – Pole position awarded by qualifying time. Italics – Pole position earned by points standings or practice time. * – Most laps led.)

ARCA Bondo/Mar-Hyde Series results
Year	Team	No.	Make	1	2	3	4	5	6	7	8	9	10	11	12	13	14	15	16	17	18	19	20	21	ABSC	Pts	Ref
1999	Bill Davis Racing	03	Pontiac	DAY	ATL	SLM	AND	CLT	MCH	POC	TOL	SBS	BLN	POC	KIL	FRS	FLM	ISF	WIN	DSF	SLM	CLT	TAL	ATL; 39	143rd	35	
