= Wim Eyckmans =

Belgian racecar driver

- Nationality: Belgium
- Born: 23 March 1973 (age 53)
- Relatives: Ean Eyckmans (son)

Previous series
- 1992 1992-93 1993 1994-95 1998 1999 2003-04: Formula Opel Euroseries; EFDA Nations Cup; Formula Opel Germany; International Formula 3000; Indy Lights; IndyCar Series; Le Mans Series
- Statistics up to date as of 28 Nov 2011.

Wim Eyckmans (born 23 March 1973, Herentals, Belgium) is a Belgian racecar driver who starting in karting in 1986 has been in prototype racing since 2003. He participated in Formula 3000 in 1994 and 1995 and ran the Indy Lights series in 1998. In 1999, he competed in the Indianapolis 500 on behalf of Cheever Racing, finishing 23rd. He now owns a successful karting company.

== Personal life ==
Eyckmans' son, Ean, is a racing driver set to compete in the 2026 Eurocup-3 season.

== Career results ==
=== Complete International Formula 3000 results ===
(key) (Races in bold indicate pole position) (Races in italics indicate fastest lap)

Year	Entrant	1	2	3	4	5	6	7	8	DC	Points
1994	Wim Eyckmans	SIL; Ret	PAU	CAT; Ret	PER	HOC; 6	SPA; 17	EST; Ret	MAG; Ret	17th	1
1995	Wim Eyckmans	SIL; 10	CAT; 12	PAU; 14	PER	HOC; 12	SPA	EST	MAG	NC	0

=== American open–wheel results ===
(key)

==== Indy Lights results ====
Year	Team	1	2	3	4	5	6	7	8	9	10	11	12	13	14	Rank	Points	Ref
1998	Brian Stewart Racing	MIA	LBH	NZR	STL	MIL	DET	POR	CLE	TOR	MIS	TRS	VAN; 12	LAG; 19	FON; 19	28th	1	

==== IndyCar ====
Year	Team	1	2	3	4	5	6	7	8	9	10	11	Rank	Points	Ref
1999	Team Cheever	WDW	PHX	CLT	INDY; 23	TXS	PPIR	ATL	DOV	PPI2	LVS	TX2	45th	7	
