= 1999 Indianapolis 500 =

American motor race

83rd Indianapolis 500
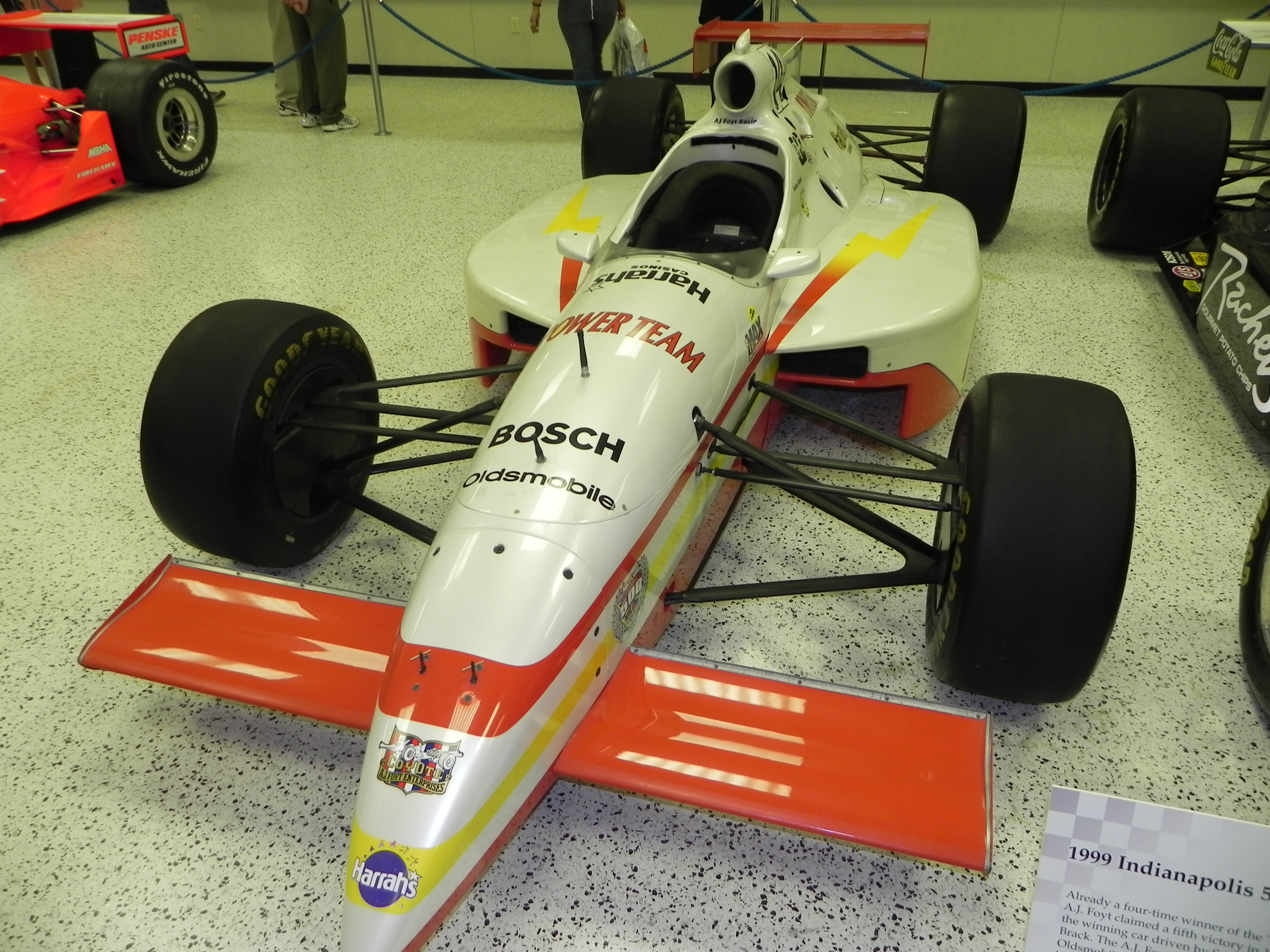

Indianapolis Motor Speedway

Indianapolis 500
- Sanctioning body: Indy Racing League
- Season: 1999 IRL season
- Date: May 30, 1999
- Winner: (Sweden) Kenny Bräck
- Winning team: A. J. Foyt Enterprises
- Winning Chief Mechanic: Bill Spencer
- Time of race: 3:15:51.182
- Average speed: 153.176 mph (247 km/h)
- Pole position: (Netherlands) Arie Luyendyk
- Pole speed: 225.179 mph (362 km/h)
- Fastest qualifier: (Netherlands) Arie Luyendyk
- Rookie of the Year: (United States) Robby McGehee
- Most laps led: (Sweden) Kenny Bräck (66)

Pre-race ceremonies
- National anthem: CeCe Winans
- "Back Home Again in Indiana": Jim Nabors
- Starting command: Mari Hulman George
- Pace car: Chevrolet Monte Carlo
- Pace car driver: Jay Leno
- Starter: Bryan Howard
- Honorary starter: Jim Postl (Pennzoil)
- Estimated attendance: 250,000

Television in the United States
- Network: ABC
- Announcers: Bob Jenkins, Tom Sneva
- Nielsen ratings: 5.5 / 18

Chronology
Previous	Next
1998	2000

The 83rd Indianapolis 500 was held at the Indianapolis Motor Speedway in Speedway, Indiana, on Sunday, May 30, 1999. The race was sanctioned by the Indy Racing League, and was part of the 1999 Pep Boys Indy Racing League season. Defending IRL champion Kenny Bräck started 8th and became the first Swedish driver to win the Indy 500.

Indy car veteran Robby Gordon, driving for Team Menard, pitted during a caution on lap 164, looking to stretch his fuel over the final 36 laps. Gordon shuffled to front on lap 174, and pulled out to a comfortable lead. In the waning laps however, Gordon's lead began to dwindle, as he was forced to slow down and save fuel. With two laps to go, he led second place Kenny Bräck by just under two seconds. Coming out of turn four to receive the white flag (the signal for one lap to go), Gordon's car sputtered and he ran out fuel. Kenny Bräck took the lead with just over one lap to go and won for car owner A. J. Foyt. The race victory represented the long-awaited "fifth" Indy 500 win for A. J. Foyt, who had previously won a record four times as a driver (1961, 1964, 1967, 1977). It was also one of the most-successful races for A. J. Foyt Enterprises, with Bräck the winner, and team cars Billy Boat third, and Robbie Buhl sixth.

Popular veteran and two-time Indy 500 winner Arie Luyendyk announced his plans to retire at the end of the event. He won the pole position and was a factor most of the first half. After leading 63 laps, however, he crashed while leading after he tangled with a backmarker. Luyendyk would later retract his retirement plans, and made a brief return to Indy in 2001–2003.

As of 2026, this stands as the 29th and final Indy victory for Goodyear tires and stands as the oldest Indianapolis 500 with all 33 starters still living. Tony Stewart, who had switched full-time to NASCAR, raced Double Duty, becoming the first driver to finish in the top ten at both Indianapolis and Charlotte on the same day.

== Background ==
During the offseason, the steel and glass Master Control Tower, which had stood along the mainstretch since 1957, had been partially dismantled in order to make way for construction of the new Pagoda. The timing and scoring floor from the old tower was left intact to house the race officials, but the upper floors were already demolished. The framework and elevator shafts for the new Pagoda had been erected, but it would not be completed until 2000. The Tower Terrace grandstands south of the Pagoda side had also been demolished, in order to clear the area for the new Formula One garages. Temporary bleachers were installed in that location, and the garages would be complete in time for the 2000 race.

=== Continuing split from CART ===
The ongoing IRL/CART split continued into its fourth year. For the third year in a row, no major teams from the CART series entered at Indianapolis. The CART series raced on Saturday of Memorial Day weekend at the Motorola 300 at Gateway near St. Louis. However, the 1999 race would end up being the final year that the CART teams stayed away. In 2000, Ganassi would return, and in subsequent years other would as well. Two-time Indy 500 Al Unser Jr. visited the track during practice, foreshadowing his switch to the IRL series for the 2000 season.

Two regular CART drivers attempted to race at both Gateway and Indianapolis in the same weekend. Robby Gordon, who was running his own team full-time in CART, entered in both the Saturday CART event at Gateway and at Sunday's Indy 500. Gordon's technical alliance and association with full-time IRL team John Menard was a critical piece in having a competitive Indy 500 attempt. Also attempting the open wheel "double duty" was veteran Roberto Moreno. Moreno had been racing regularly in CART since 1996, and had competed at Indy previously in 1986. With no ride initially to start the 1999 season, Moreno ran at Phoenix, Charlotte (canceled), and the Indy 500 with Truscelli Racing. Around the same time, Moreno was picked up in early May by PacWest Racing in CART to fill-in for the injured Mark Blundell and raced for them for eight rounds. Moreno was then hired for the next six CART races at Newman-Haas racing to fill in for the injured Christian Fittipaldi. Moreno finished 4th at Gateway, while Gordon crashed at Gateway and finished 27th.

=== Double Duty ===
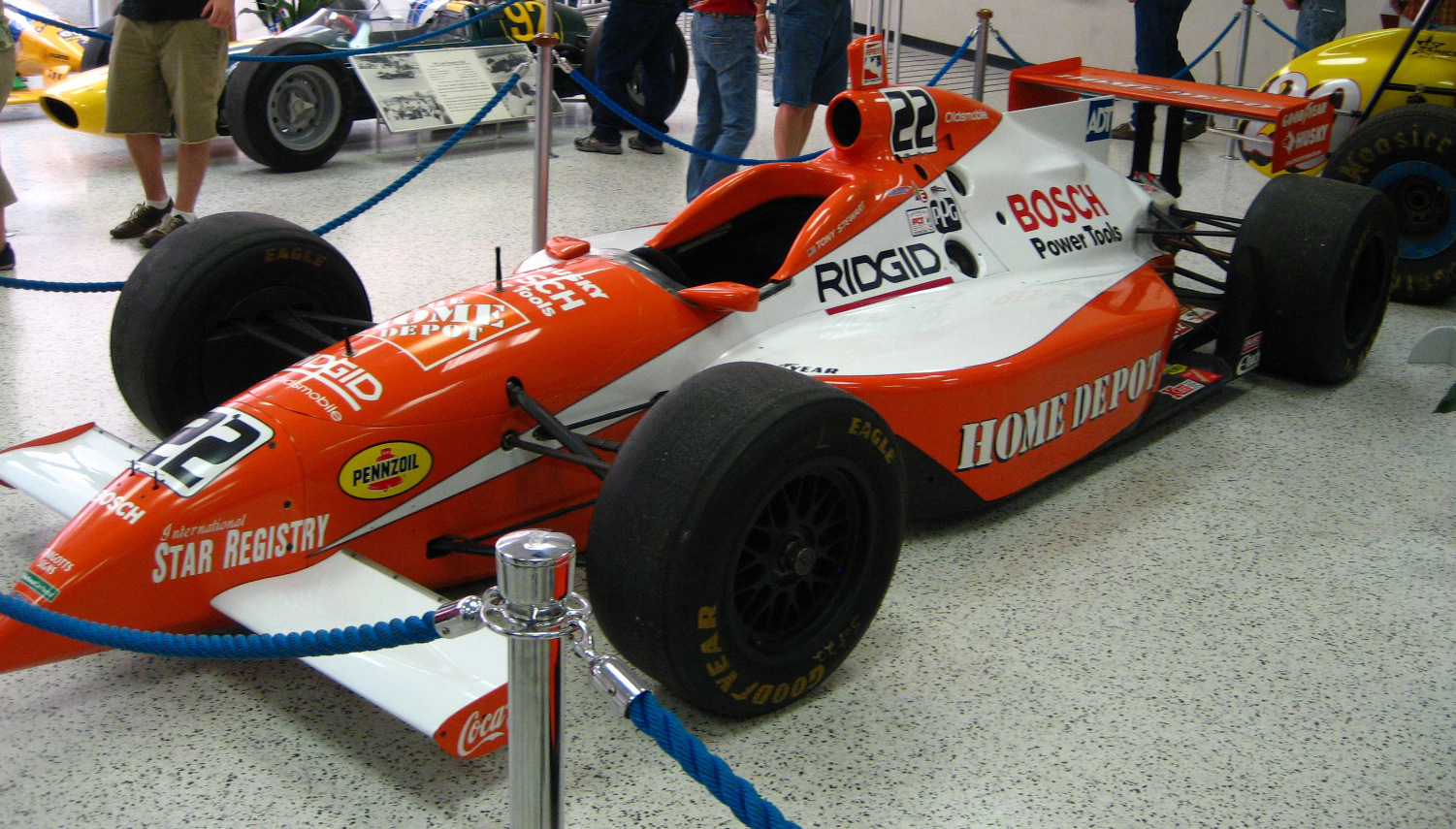
Tony Stewart's 1999 entry

For the third time, a driver attempted the Indy/Charlotte "Double Duty". Tony Stewart, who had switched full-time to NASCAR for 1999, also arranged to enter at Indy. With backing from his regular NASCAR sponsor The Home Depot and support from his car owner Joe Gibbs, Stewart was attempting to become the first driver to complete the entire 1,100 mile in one day. Previous attempts by John Andretti (1994) and Robby Gordon (1997) did not see either driver complete the full distance. On pole day at Indy, he was forced to take a risky slow speed, but held on to qualify 24th. That evening, he flew back to Charlotte to race in and finish second in The Winston.

On race day, Stewart made it to the end of both races, finishing ninth at Indy and fourth at Charlotte. He led laps and finished on the lead lap at Charlotte, but he was four laps down at Indy, thus he fell just short of completing the entire 1,100 miles.

=== Team and driver changes ===
Team Menard saw the biggest offseason changes, with 1997 season champion Tony Stewart departing for NASCAR. Greg Ray was hired to fill the vacancy. Robbie Buhl also left Menard and joined Foyt Racing for Indy.

At Treadway Racing, Arie Luyendyk returned for what was planned to be his final race.

It is believed that the 1999 race was the first since 1964 that longtime Indy veteran George Snider did not participate in any capacity. Since 1965, Snider had driven in the race 22 times, and in other years served as a crew member.

=== Rule changes ===
- Chassis and engine rules remained the same from 1998. All entries utilized 4.0 L normally aspirated engines, with a rev limit of 10,300 rpm. This was the last year for use of the first generation IRL chassis, which were introduced in 1997.
- For 1999, the pit road speed limit was reduced to 80 mph. From 1992 to 1998, the speed limit had been 100 mph.
- Wheel tethers were required in time for the race to prevent tires from flying off cars during crashes and potentially injuring spectators and drivers. This came in direct response to the tragic crash on May 1 at Charlotte where a wheel assembly was punted into the grandstands, killing three spectators and injuring eight.
- All car numbers decals were required to be a standard black font on a white box. The number locations were standardized; one on the nose, one on the left side above the fuel buckeye, and one on the right. The number panel on the right side was larger than the one on the left, and more centered vertically.

== Race schedule ==
Race schedule — April 1999
Sun	Mon	Tue	Wed	Thu	Fri	Sat
4	5	6	7	8 ROP	9 ROP	10; Testing
11; ROP/Testing	12; Testing	13; Testing	14	15	16	17
Race schedule — May 1999
9	10	11	12	13	14	15; Practice
16; Practice	17; Practice	18; Practice	19; Practice	20; Practice	21; Practice	22; Pole Day
23; Bump Day	24	25	26	27; Carb Day	28	29; Parade
30; Indy 500	31; Memorial Day					

Color	Notes
Green	Practice
Dark Blue	Time trials
Silver	Race day
Red	Rained out*
Blank	No track activity

* Includes days where track
activity was significantly
limited due to rain

ROP — denotes Rookie
Orientation Program

== Practice ==
=== Rookie Orientation & Open Testing ===
For the second year in a row, practice and qualifying during the month of May was trimmed down to a compressed "two week" schedule. In addition, for the second time, an open test was conducted in early April, which also included the annual rookie orientation program.

Rookie orientation was scheduled for April 8–9, while open testing was scheduled for April 10–13. Ten drivers took laps during rookie orientation, with nine passing all four phases. Jeret Schroeder (216.596 mph) turned the fastest lap of the session on Saturday April 10. All track activity on Friday April 9 was rained out.

During the veteran's open test, Greg Ray turned the fastest lap of the week at 227.072 mph. Tyce Carlson was second at 225.683 mph.

=== Opening Day – Saturday May 15 ===
Opening day for the month of May was held Saturday May 15 under sunny skies and temperatures in the high 70s. Stéphan Grégoire, in a car owned by Dick Simon was the first car out of the garage, and the first car on the track, continuing a tradition held by Simon-owned entries.

Greg Ray (225.887 mph) ran the fastest lap of the day. No serious incidents were reported, but Ray, Mike Groff, Robby Unser, Donnie Beechler, and Scott Harrington all brought out yellow flags for blown engines or mechanical failures.

=== Sunday May 16 ===
About a half-hour into the session, Billy Boat spun and crashed in turn 1. He was uninjured, and returned to the track in a back-up car later in the afternoon.

After racing at Richmond the previous night, Tony Stewart arrived at the Speedway and took his first laps of the month on Sunday. He was 7th-best lap of the day at 222.091 mph.

Greg Ray once again led the speed chart at 225.124 mph.

=== Monday May 17 ===
The day started with Robby Gordon on the track for the first time during the month. A few minutes later, Mike Borkowski crashed heavily in turn 2 at 11:57 a.m. He climbed from the car uninjured.

Scott Harrington crashed in turn three, and Billy Boat had his second crash in two days. Both drivers were cleared to drive.

At 3:46 p.m., rain began to fall, closing the track early for the day. Greg Ray once more led the speed chart (224.843 mph).

=== Tuesday May 18 ===
Overnight rain and moisture kept the track closed until 2:00 p.m. Another shower closed it again until almost 4 o'clock. A brief practice session still saw 37 drivers take to the track, and over 1,400 laps completed. Scott Goodyear (223.842 mph) finally bumped Greg Ray off the top of the speed chart.

=== Wednesday May 19 ===
Rookie Dave Steele crashed hard into the outside wall in turn 1 at 11:33 a.m., suffering a concussion, and was forced to sit out the remainder of the month. About an hour later, Greg Ray blew an engine, and Tyce Carlson who was behind him, slid in the oil laid down by Ray's engine. Carlson spun and tapped the outside wall in the south chute, but the car only suffered minor damage.

The third crash of the day involved Mark Dismore. He hit the wall twice between turns 1 and 2, but was not injured.

With just 30 minutes left in the day, Tony Stewart completed a lap of 226.683 mph, the fastest lap thus far for the month.

=== Thursday May 20 ===
Crashes were suffered by Johnny Unser and Tony Stewart. Both drivers were uninjured. Greg Ray was back on top of the speed chart at 227.192 mph, fastest of the month.

=== "Fast" Friday May 21 ===
The final full day of practice saw Greg Ray (227.175 mph) once again top the speed chart. However, Arie Luyendyk (226.131 mph) was close behind in second.

John Paul Jr. was injured in a crash around 1:30 p.m., and he was sidelined for the month with a severe back contusion. Also crashing was Mike Borkowski, his second wreck of the week.

== Time trials ==
=== Pole Day – Saturday May 22 ===
Time trials opened at 12:00 p.m., with overcast skies and temperatures in the mid-60s. The early attention focused on Tony Stewart, and his busy qualifying schedule. Stewart's attempt at "Double Duty" meant that he was due in Charlotte later that afternoon for The Winston all-star race, and had a tight window in which to qualify at Indy. Stewart was the second car in line to make a qualifying attempt, but settled for a disappointing 220.653 mph run. Minutes later, Stewart was escorted to the airport and departed for Concord, North Carolina. The slow qualifying speed put Stewart in a somewhat precarious situation that left him vulnerable to possibly being bumped before day's end.

At 12:50 p.m., Billy Boat crashed for the third time of the month. On his warmup lap, he spun on cold tires in turn 2, and hit the wall on the backstretch. Minutes later, Robbie Buhl crashed on his warmup lap as well.

At 1:17 p.m., Kenny Brack (222.650 mph) took over the provisional pole position with eight cars in the field. At 1:30 p.m., Arie Luyendyk took to the track, attempting to qualify for what was to be his final Indy 500. His four-lap average of 225.179 mph secured him the pole position, and was a track record for normally-aspirated engines.

The next two hours saw heavy activity, and by 3:30 p.m., the field was filled to 25 cars. The last car with a likely shot at the pole was Greg Ray. After a lap of 225.643 mph (which tied Luyendyk's fastest single lap), Ray ended up second with a four-lap average of 225.073 mph, just 0.075 seconds behind Luyendyk's time.

After a brief down period, activity picked up in the final hour. After crashing earlier in the day, Billy Boat put his car on the outside of the front row. His four-lap average of 223.469 mph was third-fastest. One car, later, Robby Gordon qualified 4th at 223.066 mph.

As time trials closed for the day at 6 o'clock, Scott Harrington completed his run, filling the field to a full 33 cars. It was the first time since 1983 that the field had been completely filled in one afternoon, and was accomplished despite a one-hour rain delay. Tony Stewart's early run held on to put him in 24th starting position.

Luyendyk's pole position was the third of his career (1993, 1997), and his fifth front row start.

Later that night, Tony Stewart won the Winston Open and finished second in The Winston.

=== Bump Day - Sunday May 23 ===
The second and final day of qualifying opened with rain in the forecast and about six drivers looking to bump their way into the field. During morning practice, Lyn St. James blew an engine and crashed in turn 4. She had entered the day on the bubble, and if she were to be bumped, she would be done for the month. With only six drivers ready, and rain on its way, Tony Stewart's slow speed from Saturday was now considered safe.

Time trials began at 12 noon, with Raul Boesel easily bumping his way into the field. St. James was bumped, missing the race for the second year in a row. Boesel was followed by Johnny Unser who went even faster. Robbie Buhl, however, was having trouble all weekend. After crashing on Saturday, he blew his engine on his warm up lap, and the team feverishly started installing a new motor.

Andy Michner spun on his first qualifying attempt, but did not make any contact. He waved off his second attempt after being too slow. Rain clouds were entering the area, and threatened to wash out the rest of the day. At 1:48 p.m., Mike Groff (220.066 mph) bumped his way into the field. However, he himself was now on the bubble.

At 1:58 p.m., Foyt Racing had hastily prepared a car for Robbie Buhl and put it in the qualifying line. The car had spare pieces from other machines, and the car number was taped on with black electrical tape. Buhl's run of 220.115 mph barely bumped out Groff, despite sprinkles falling during the last two laps. Seconds after the checkered flag, heavy rain began to fall, all but securing Buhl's spot in the race.

The track closed for the day due to rain with Stéphan Grégoire waiting in line. It was the first time an entry associated with Dick Simon failed to qualify since 1982.

== Carburetion Day ==
The final practice session was held Thursday May 27. Sam Schmidt (222.458 mph) was the fastest driver of the day. No major incidents were reported. Greg Ray took laps in both his primary car, and the car of Robby Gordon, as Gordon was at Gateway to qualify for the Motorola 300. Scott Goodyear suffered an engine failure, and Jimmy Kite stalled with clutch problems.

Roberto Moreno, who was also scheduled to race at Gateway, practiced for about an hour, then departed for St. Louis. Both Moreno and Gordon would be back on Sunday for race day. Tony Stewart returned to the track after his busy weekend. He took part in pole qualifying for the Coca-Cola 600 on Wednesday night, but did not make the top 25 there (he ranked 27th). He planned on 'standing on his time' at Charlotte and remained in Indianapolis for the rest of the day. Since Stewart was expected to miss the mandatory NASCAR pre-race drivers meeting, he was poised to start last on the grid at Charlotte regardless of his qualifying speed.

=== Pit Stop Challenge ===
The 23rd annual Coors Pit Stop Challenge was held Thursday May 27. Eight teams competed for $80,000 in prizes. The top three race qualifiers and their respective pit crews were automatically eligible: Arie Luyendyk, Greg Ray, and Billy Boat. Two teams earned berths by winning the Coors Light Pit Stop Contest Award during the first two races of the 1999 IRL season. McCormack Motorsports earned the spot at WDW with driver Raul Boesel, but switched to driver Jimmy Kite. Panther Racing (Scott Goodyear) earned the award at Phoenix. The last three spots would be up for grabs during a "playoff" scheduled for May 19.

Six teams took part in a last-chance qualifying "playoff" on Wednesday May 19, with the top three advancing to the elimination bracket. The results were as follows: Arie Luyendyk (12.11 seconds), Davey Hamilton (12.90 seconds), Kenny Bräck (13.26 seconds), Scott Sharp (first alternate), Eddie Cheever (second alternate), Eliseo Salazar (third alternate). Luyendyk ended up making the event based on qualifying for the front row, so Hamilton, Bräck, and Sharp advanced from the "playoff".

The eight-team, head-to-head, single-elimination competition was held after the final practice. Galles Racing with chief mechanic Darren Russell and driver Davey Hamilton defeated A. J. Foyt Racing with driver Kenny Bräck in the finals. It was their sixth victory in the event, and they donated their prize money to Spinal Conquest, for spinal cord research.

Quarterfinals
9	Davey Hamilton (Galles Racing)	12.700
91	Scott Goodyear (Panther Racing)	13.020
8	Scott Sharp (Kelley Racing)	12.980
5	Arie Luyendyk (Treadway Racing)	no time
2	Greg Ray (Team Menard)	14.120
11	Billy Boat (A. J. Foyt Enterprises)	14.370
14	Kenny Bräck (A. J. Foyt Enterprises)	14.450
30	Jimmy Kite (McCormack)	16.802

Semifinals
9	Davey Hamilton (Galles Racing)	12.490
11	Scott Sharp (Kelley Racing)	13.510
14	Kenny Bräck (A. J. Foyt Enterprises)	14.200
2	Greg Ray (Team Menard)	27.060

Finals
9	Davey Hamilton (Galles Racing)	12.680
14	Kenny Bräck (A. J. Foyt Enterprises)	14.560

== Starting grid ==
Row	Inside		Middle		Outside	
1	5	(Netherlands) Arie Luyendyk W	2	(United States) Greg Ray	11	(United States) Billy Boat
2	32	(United States) Robby Gordon	28	(United States) Mark Dismore	8	(United States) Scott Sharp
3	99	(United States) Sam Schmidt	14	(Sweden) Kenny Brack	4	(Canada) Scott Goodyear
4	54	(Japan) Hideshi Matsuda	9	(United States) Davey Hamilton	42	(United States) John Hollansworth Jr. R
5	35	(United States) Steve Knapp	21	(United States) Jeff Ward	20	(United States) Tyce Carlson
6	51	(United States) Eddie Cheever W	81	(United States) Robby Unser	6	(Chile) Eliseo Salazar
7	98	(United States) Donnie Beechler	19	(United States) Stan Wattles	96	(United States) Jeret Schroeder R
8	91	(United States) Buddy Lazier W	33	(Brazil) Roberto Moreno	22	(United States) Tony Stewart
9	50	(Colombia) Roberto Guerrero	12	(United States) Buzz Calkins	55	(United States) Robby McGehee R
10	30	(United States) Jimmy Kite	52	(Belgium) Wim Eyckmans R	92	(United States) Johnny Unser
11	17	(United States) Dr. Jack Miller	84	(United States) Robbie Buhl	3	(Brazil) Raul Boesel

=== Alternates ===
- First alternate: (United States) Mike Groff (#46) - Bumped
- Second alternate: (United States) Scott Harrington (#66) - Bumped

=== Failed to Qualify ===
- (France) Stephan Gregoire (#7) - Bumped
- (United States) Jaques Lazier (#15) - Bumped
- (United States) Lyn St. James (#90) - Bumped
- (United States) Andy Michner (#10) - Wave off
- (United States) Nick Firestone R (#31) - Wave off
- (United States) Mike Borkowski R (#18) - Practice crash
- (United States) Dave Steele R (#43) - Practice crash, injured
- (United States) Ronnie Johncox R (#18) - passed rookie orientation
- (United States) Troy Regier (#15) - failed rookie orientation

== Race summary ==
=== Start ===
Medal of Honor winners were honored during the pre-race ceremonies, coinciding with the unveiling of the new Medal of Honor Memorial in downtown Indianapolis. The national anthem was performed by gospel singer CeCe Winans.

Polesitter, and race favorite Arie Luyendyk jumped out to the early lead, holding the top spot for the first 32 laps. The first caution flag flew on lap 9 when Eliseo Salazar got loose coming off turn 2 and slammed into the inside wall.

==== Pit incident ====
During the first caution, several cars pitted. At the north end of the pits, Jimmy Kite's car clipped the left rear wheel of Jeret Schroeder, sending Kite into the pit box of Robby McGehee. The collision knocked out a few members of McGehee's crew, including crew chief Steve Fried, of Mentor, Ohio, who was working on the right front tire. Fried was initially listed in critical condition at Methodist Hospital with a head injury. Later in the race, he was reported as awake and alert, but he would require a lengthy recuperation. Kite's car suffered extensive internal damage and spent most of the race in the garage for repairs, before retiring late due to engine trouble. In subsequent years, it was made mandatory for pit crew members to wear helmets and other protective gear.

=== First half ===
Arie Luyendyk and Greg Ray took turns at the front for nearly all of the first 60 laps. Luyendyk relinquished his lead after making a pit stop on lap 33, and Ray led the next lap before he came in for service. Sam Schmidt inherited the lead until the cars of Roberto Guerrero and Hideshi Matsuda stalled on the track, bringing out a yellow flag. Schmidt and several others pitted under the caution, allowing Luyendyk to retake the lead. Kenny Bräck, the reigning IRL champion, driving for four-time Indianapolis 500 winner A. J. Foyt, took the lead for the first time on lap 60 after passing Ray in turn two.

Sam Schmidt brought out the yellow when he backed into the wall in turn one on lap 63. Luyendyk regained the lead following pit stops, but was passed by Bräck shortly after the restart. On lap 84, Ray returned to the lead by passing Brack. Steve Knapp backed into the turn 1 wall to bring out the fourth caution on lap 94. Shortly after the restart on lap 100, Scott Goodyear, another of the prerace favorites, brought out another yellow, stopping in turn two with engine problems.

=== Second half ===
Arie Luyendyk was leading on lap 118 when he approached the lapped car of Tyce Carlson going into in turn three. Luyendyk tried to overtake Carlson on the inside of the corner, but grazed the left rear wheel, slid backwards and into the turn three wall. It was race's sixth caution period. With Luyendyk out of the race, Greg Ray took over the lead. As Ray completed his pit stop, he moved toward the far lane, unaware that Mark Dismore, who was entering for his service, was already occupying that lane. Both cars collided and slid into the vacant pit box of Scott Sharp, which was adjacent to Dismore's pit. Dismore continued on, but Ray suffered serious front suspension damage and dropped out of the race.

Defending Indy 500 champion Eddie Cheever led the field for the restart on lap 124, but was passed by Kenny Bräck and Jeff Ward at the drop of the green. Brack stretched his advantage to as much as 5 seconds. Meanwhile, Tony Stewart had fallen back considerably due to handling problems and made an unscheduled pit stop. Cheever's day suddenly ended on lap 140 due to an engine problem. Bräck made a green-flag stop on lap 150, and Ward grabbed the lead for 2 laps until he pitted, putting Bräck out in front again.

With less than 40 laps left, Bräck and Ward continued to run 1st-2nd. Bräck's teammate at A. J. Foyt Racing, Billy Boat moved up to 3rd place; Mark Dismore was hanging in 4th place despite the pit road mishap on the last yellow flag; and rookie Robby McGehee, despite concerns about the health of his crew chief after the early pit road incident, was in 5th place. Also in contention was Team Menard driver Robby Gordon. With teammate Greg Ray already out of the race after the mishap with Dismore, Gordon was left to carry the banner for owner John Menard, who was making his 20th appearance at Indy.

On Lap 162, the caution came out again for Jimmy Kite's stalled car. During the caution, some of the leaders made routine pit stops, Robby Gordon among them. Gordon was running sixth out of the seven cars remaining on the lead lap. He came into the pits on lap 164, one lap before the green came back out. The Menard team was gambling by topping off the fuel tank in the hopes he would have enough fuel to last the final 36 laps. The green came out on lap 165, but on lap 169, Mark Dismore brushed the wall off turn two. The right-front wheel separated and bounced across the track on the backstretch, bringing out the final caution of the race. Most of the leaders pitted under this caution, which would be their final scheduled stops. Gordon stayed out on the track, and shuffled to the lead for the restart which came on lap 174.

=== Finish ===
As the laps wound down, with twenty laps to go, Gordon had built a comfortable lead. His crew insisted that he was ok on fuel. Behind him, with 12 laps remaining, Kenny Bräck made a move around Jeff Ward for second place. Bräck began charging and narrowed the deficit as Gordon struggled to keep fuel in the car. On lap 195, he was 3.5 seconds behind. By lap 198, the lead was down to less than 2 seconds.

With two laps to go, the lapped car of Robbie Buhl was all that separated Gordon and Bräck. Bräck was 1.5 seconds behind Gordon as they approached turn three. Heading into turn four, Gordon's machine began sputtering and he veered onto pit road, out of fuel. Bräck assumed the lead at the head of the mainstretch and took the white flag to start the final lap. The next time by, the checkered flag waved with Bräck the winner. Gordon settled for 4th place.

Bräck's victory marked the fifth overall Indianapolis 500 victory for A. J. Foyt - four as a driver or owner/driver (1961, 1964, 1967, 1977) and one as an owner (1999). Bräck, who led the most laps in the race (66), took the lead for good at the end of lap 199. At the time, it equaled the official record for the latest lead change. However, unofficially, it was in fact the latest lead change in Indy history (until 2006), with Bräck assuming the lead approximately 2.8 miles to the checkered flag.

=== Post-race notes ===
In the engine battle between the Oldsmobile Aurora and the Nissan Infiniti, Aurora dominated the race, leading 196 of 200 laps. The top 15 starters used Auroras. Eddie Cheever performed the best of the Infiniti powerplants, leading the 4 laps not led by Aurora. Jeret Schroeder was the top finisher among Infiniti-powered cars, finishing 15th after dropping out late in the race.

Chilean driver Eliseo Salazar, who crashed out of the race in the opening laps, was awarded with the Scott Brayton trophy, awarded to the driver best exemplifying the character and racing spirit of the late driver Scott Brayton. Robbie Buhl, who struggled during practice and barely made the field on Bump Day, charged from 32nd starting position to finish 6th. He joined winner Bräck, and third place Billy Boat for three Foyt cars in the top six.

Scott Sharp, who qualified on the outside of the second row, suffered a humiliating gaffe when his pit crew neglected to remove the protective air blocks from the radiator inlets. The car pulled away from the grid with the air blocks still inserted, precipitating a swift and uncontrollable overheating condition. Though the crew was able to get the car back out on the track, the damage was done, and the car dropped out short of the halfway point with transmission and engine failure. The incident prompted some teams across the grid to pay more attention to pre-race checklists and affix fluorescent "warning strips" or brightly colored flags to the air blocks and other similar devices to avoid similar failures in the future.

Linda Conti, the team manager for 5th place Robby McGehee, is believed to have been the first female team manager in Indy 500 history. The race was completed just prior to the start of another major sporting event in Indianapolis. Just six miles away at Market Square Arena, the Pacers hosted the Knicks in Game 1 of the Eastern Conference Finals.

== Box score ==
Finish	Start	No	Name	Qual	Chassis	Engine	Tire	Laps	Status	Entrant
1	8	14	(Sweden) Kenny Bräck	222.659	Dallara	Oldsmobile	G	200	153.176 mph	A. J. Foyt Enterprises
2	14	21	(United States) Jeff Ward	221.363	Dallara	Oldsmobile	G	200	+6.562	Pagan Racing
3	3	11	(United States) Billy Boat	223.469	Dallara	Oldsmobile	G	200	+24.838	A. J. Foyt Enterprises
4	4	32	(United States) Robby Gordon	223.066	Dallara	Oldsmobile	F	200	+1:16.916	Team Menard
5	27	55	(United States) Robby McGehee R	220.139	Dallara	Oldsmobile	F	199	-1 Lap	Conti Racing
6	32	84	(United States) Robbie Buhl	220.115	Dallara	Oldsmobile	G	199	-1 Lap	A. J. Foyt Enterprises
7	22	91	(United States) Buddy Lazier W	220.721	Dallara	Oldsmobile	G	198	-2 Laps	Hemelgarn Racing
8	17	81	(United States) Robby Unser	221.304	Dallara	Oldsmobile	F	197	-3 Laps	Team Pelfrey
9	24	22	(United States) Tony Stewart	220.653	Dallara	Oldsmobile	G	196	-4 Laps	Tri-Star Motorsports
10	10	54	(Japan) Hideshi Matsuda	222.064	Dallara	Oldsmobile	F	196	-4 Laps	Beck Motorsports
11	11	9	(United States) Davey Hamilton	221.866	Dallara	Oldsmobile	G	196	-4 Laps	Galles Racing
12	33	3	(Brazil) Raul Boesel	220.101	Riley & Scott	Oldsmobile	G	195	-5 Laps	Brant Racing
13	12	42	(United States) John Hollansworth Jr. R	221.698	Dallara	Oldsmobile	F	192	-8 Laps	TeamXtreme
14	15	20	(United States) Tyce Carlson	221.322	Dallara	Oldsmobile	F	190	-10 Laps	Blueprint/Immke Racing
15	21	96	(United States) Jeret Schroeder R	220.747	Dallara	Infiniti	F	175	Engine	Cobb Racing
16	5	28	(United States) Mark Dismore	222.962	Dallara	Oldsmobile	G	168	Accident T2	Kelley Racing
17	20	19	(United States) Stan Wattles	220.833	Dallara	Oldsmobile	G	147	Running	Metro Racing
18	16	51	(United States) Eddie Cheever W	221.315	Dallara	Infiniti	G	139	Engine	Team Cheever
19	26	12	(United States) Buzz Calkins	220.297	G-Force	Oldsmobile	F	133	Running	Bradley Motorsports
20	23	33	(Brazil) Roberto Moreno	220.705	G-Force	Oldsmobile	G	122	Transmission	Truscelli Team Racing
21	2	2	(United States) Greg Ray	225.073	Dallara	Oldsmobile	F	120	Accident Pits	Team Menard
22	1	5	(Netherlands) Arie Luyendyk W	225.179	G-Force	Oldsmobile	F	117	Accident T3	Treadway Racing
23	29	52	(Belgium) Wim Eyckmans R	220.092	Dallara	Oldsmobile	G	113	Timing Chain	Team Cheever
24	28	30	(United States) Jimmy Kite	220.097	G-Force	Oldsmobile	F	110	Engine	McCormack Motorsports
25	25	50	(Colombia) Roberto Guerrero	220.479	G-Force	Infiniti	F	105	Engine	Cobb Racing
26	13	35	(United States) Steve Knapp	221.502	G-Force	Oldsmobile	G	104	Handling	ISM Racing
27	9	4	(Canada) Scott Goodyear	222.387	G-Force	Oldsmobile	G	101	Engine	Panther Racing
28	6	8	(United States) Scott Sharp	222.771	Dallara	Oldsmobile	G	83	Transmission	Kelley Racing
29	19	98	(United States) Donnie Beechler	221.228	Dallara	Oldsmobile	F	74	Engine	Cahill Racing
30	7	99	(United States) Sam Schmidt	222.734	G-Force	Oldsmobile	F	62	Accident T1	Treadway Racing
31	31	17	(United States) Dr. Jack Miller	220.277	Dallara	Oldsmobile	G	29	Clutch	Tri-Star Motorsports
32	30	92	(United States) Johnny Unser	221.197	Dallara	Oldsmobile	G	10	Brakes	Hemelgarn Racing
33	18	6	(Chile) Eliseo Salazar	221.265	G-Force	Oldsmobile	F	7	Accident T2	Nienhouse Motorsports

W Former Indianapolis 500 winner

R Indianapolis 500 Rookie

=== Race statistics ===
Lap Leaders
Laps	Leader
1–32	Arie Luyendyk
33	Greg Ray
34–37	Sam Schmidt
38–44	Arie Luyendyk
45–59	Greg Ray
60–64	Kenny Bräck
65–69	Arie Luyendyk
70–82	Kenny Bräck
83–95	Greg Ray
96–98	Kenny Bräck
99–117	Arie Luyendyk
118–120	Greg Ray
121–124	Eddie Cheever
125–150	Kenny Bräck
151–153	Jeff Ward
154–170	Kenny Bräck
171–198	Robby Gordon
199–200	Kenny Bräck

Total laps led
Driver	Laps
Kenny Bräck	66
Arie Luyendyk	63
Greg Ray	32
Robby Gordon	28
Eddie Cheever	4
Sam Schmidt	4
Jeff Ward	3

Cautions: 8 for 42 laps
Laps	Reason
9–14	Eliseo Salazar crash in turn 2
35–39	Hideshi Matsuda stalled on track
63–68	Sam Schmidt crash in turn 1
93–98	Steve Knapp spun in turn 2
102–105	Scott Goodyear blown engine
118–124	Arie Luyendyk crash in turn 3; Ray, Dismore accident in pits
162–164	Jimmy Kite stalled on track
169–173	Mark Dismore crash in turn 2

Tire participation chart
Supplier	No. of starters
Goodyear	18*
Firestone	15
* - Denotes race winner

== Sports Illustrated controversy ==
On May 1, 1999, at the VisionAire 500K at Lowe's Motor Speedway three spectators were killed, and eight others (two of whom were children) were injured when a piece of debris went into the grandstands. On the 61st lap, Stan Wattles crashed in turn four, shearing off both right-side wheels. The car of John Paul Jr. struck one of the loose wheels, propelling it into the stands. A witness claimed a wheel with sheared suspension pieces still attached flew into the seating area. The incident followed a similar accident at a CART series race at Michigan nine months earlier, and occurred two weeks before the Indianapolis Motor Speedway was scheduled to open for practice.

In the May 10, 1999, edition of Sports Illustrated, Ed Hinton penned an article reporting the tragedy, and discussed the general topic of safety in motorsports. The magazine's editors in New York published the article accompanied by an AP photograph taken at the scene. The photo featured a security guard standing next to two dead bodies in the grandstands covered with bloody sheets, and blood covering the steps.

In the week following the magazine's release, IMS/IRL president Tony George issued a letter stating his extreme displeasure with the article and the photo, describing that it was insensitive and inappropriate, and declared that Hinton was to be denied credentials to the 1999 Indianapolis 500 and future events at the track. Immediately after word of the ban spread, press and media response was very negative. The Chicago Tribune, The Detroit News, Los Angeles Times, and several other newspapers announced they were all boycotting the event, citing censorship. In addition, they came to the defense of Hinton, because he wrote only the text in the article, and did not know about the photograph until after the edition was published.

A few days later, the controversy reached a boiling point, and George backed down and retracted the ban. He issued Hinton his credentials, and most of the reporters (some reluctantly) returned to cover the race. However, the Hinton/censorship incident stayed in the news for a long time, and caused friction between the media and the still-fledgling league.

Due to the tragedy at Charlotte, the league adopted wheel tethers in time for the 1999 Indy 500 to prevent tires from flying off cars during crashes and potentially injuring spectators and drivers.

== Broadcasting ==
=== Radio ===
The race was carried live on the Indy Racing Radio Network. Mike King was named the new chief announcer, and became the fifth person to serve as Voice of the 500. Previous chief announcer Bob Jenkins left the network to take over the announcing role on ABC-TV. The broadcast was heard on 556 affiliates.

The broadcasting booth for the 1999 race was located in a makeshift manner, temporarily installed in the then under-construction Pagoda. Booth announcers King, Rutherford, and others were situated in an elevator shaft, with no access to the ground or restrooms while the race was underway.

Gary Lee departed, and was replaced in turn three by Kevin O'Neal, a reporter from The Indianapolis Star and announcer from the Indianapolis Speedrome. It was O'Neal's only appearance on the network. Chris Denari also made his network debut.

With King as the new chief announcer, a trend returned to the broadcasts starting in 1999, not seen since the days of Sid Collins. King began to interview booth guests (celebrities, politicians, and sponsor representatives), whether live in-person, or pre-recorded. For 1999, the limitations of the booth precluded live interviews, but John F. Fielder of BorgWarner was featured in a pre-recorded segment.

Indy Racing Radio Network
Booth Announcers	Turn Reporters	Pit/garage reporters
Chief Announcer: Mike King; Driver expert: Johnny Rutherford; Statistician: Howdy Bell; Historian: Donald Davidson	Turn 1: Jerry Baker; Turn 2: Ken Double; Turn 3: Kevin O'Neal R Turn 4: Bob Lamey	Chuck Marlowe (garages/hospital); Chris Economaki (interviews/roving reporter)
Chief Announcer: Mike King; Driver expert: Johnny Rutherford; Statistician: Howdy Bell; Historian: Donald Davidson	Turn 1: Jerry Baker; Turn 2: Ken Double; Turn 3: Kevin O'Neal R Turn 4: Bob Lamey	Chris Denari (north pits) R Vince Welch (middle pits); Mark Jaynes (south pits)

=== Television ===
The race was carried live flag-to-flag coverage in the United States on ABC Sports. Changes were made at ABC/ESPN for 1999, as the networks created separate crews for their IRL and CART broadcasts. Paul Page, who had broadcast the 500 with either radio or television since 1974, was removed and shifted to the CART series. Bob Jenkins, formerly the radio network announcer for the 500, moved into the ABC-TV booth.

Tom Sneva returned as analyst, and for 1999 the "host" position was revived, with longtime ABC personality Al Michaels joining the crew. Jack Arute had left ABC for a short time to cover IRL races on Speedvision and FSN, and thus was absent from this telecast. Jon Beekhuis was brought in to take his place in the pit area. Meanwhile, Gary Gerould conducted the winner's interview in victory lane, which was normally Arute's duty.

With Paul Page not part of the broadcast, this was the first Indy 500 in over a decade without the familiar "Delta Force intro". In addition, a new camera angle debuted, mounted at the top of the famous scoring pylon. Three episodes of COPS were filmed in the city of Indianapolis during race weekend of 1999. Footage of the 500 Festival Parade was shown, as well as police action outside the track the days leading up to the race.

ABC Television
Booth Announcers	Pit/garage reporters
Host: Al Michaels; Announcer: Bob Jenkins; Color: Tom Sneva	Jon Beekhuis; Gary Gerould; Dr. Jerry Punch

Practice and time trials were carried over three networks: ABC, ESPN, and ESPN2.

- Live Daily Reports (ESPN2): Bob Jenkins, Johnny Rutherford (Sun.), Jon Beekhuis (Mon.-Fri.), Jerry Punch, Bob Varsha (Sun), and Gary Gerould.
- Time trials (ABC): Jenkins, Tom Sneva, Beekhuis, and Gerould.
- Time trials (ESPN/ESPN2): Jenkins, Rutherford, Punch, Gerould, and Varsha.
- Carb Day (ESPN): Varsha, Rutherford, Punch, and Steven Cox.

At the track, several of the electronic dot matrix scoreboards were removed and replaced with four Daktronics ProStarä Video Plus screens and three Daktronics ProStarä large screens (one each inside the four turns, one each inside the two shortchutes, and one along the north end of the mainstretch). A year later, the project was completed, and an additional six Daktronics ProStarä video screens were installed along the inside and outside of the frontstretch. Also, Michael Buffer joined the public address crew as guest announcer.

== Notes ==
=== Works cited ===
- 1999 Indianapolis 500 Daily Trackside Report for the Media
- Indianapolis 500 History: Race & All-Time Stats - Official Site
- 1999 Indianapolis 500 Radio Broadcast, Indianapolis Motor Speedway Radio Network

1998 Indianapolis 500; Eddie Cheever Jr.	1999 Indianapolis 500; Kenny Bräck	2000 Indianapolis 500; Juan Pablo Montoya
