= Dover Motor Speedway =

Motorsport track in the United States

The Monster Mile

- Oval (1969–present)
- Location: 1131 North Dupont Highway; Dover, Delaware, United States; 19901
- Coordinates: 39°11′24″N 75°31′48″W
- Capacity: 54,000
- Owner: Speedway Motorsports (November 2021–present)
- Broke ground: October 1967; 58 years ago
- Opened: 8 March 1969; 57 years ago
- Construction cost: US$5.2 million
- Former names: Dover International Speedway (2002–2021); Dover Downs International Speedway (1969–2002)
- Major events: Current: NASCAR Cup Series; NASCAR All-Star Race (2026); Autotrader EchoPark Automotive 400 (1969–2025, 2027); Dover 400 (1971–2020); NASCAR O'Reilly Auto Parts Series; BetRivers 200 (1982–present); Drydene 200 (1986–2020); NASCAR Craftsman Truck Series; Ecosave 200 (2000–2020, 2026); Former: Indy Racing League (1998–1999); USAC Championship Car (1969)
- Website: dovermotorspeedway.com

Oval
- Surface: Concrete (1995–present); Asphalt (1969–1994)
- Length: 1.000 mi (1.609 km)
- Turns: 4
- Banking: Turns: 24° Straights: 9°
- Race lap record: 0:19.622 (183.468 mph (295.263 km/h)) ( (United States) Greg Ray, Dallara IR-7, 1998, IRL)

Dover Motor Speedway (known as the Dover International Speedway from 2002 to 2021 and as the Dover Downs International Speedway from 1969 to 2001) is a 1.000 mi (1.609 km) oval track in Dover, Delaware, United States. The venue has hosted major events since its inaugural season in 1969, including NASCAR and IndyCar races. It has a 54,000-seat capacity as of 2022. Adjacent to Bally's Dover, which owns the surrounding property, the speedway itself is owned by Speedway Motorsports, LLC (SMI) and managed by Mike Tatoian.

The track opened in 1969 as a combined horse and auto racing facility under the control of David P. Buckson, then-Attorney General of Delaware. The facility, particularly its horse racing endeavors, quickly faced financial troubles but was sustained by its NASCAR events and financial support from then-owner John W. Rollins. Expansion occurred in the 1980s and 1990s, spurred by the rise in popularity of NASCAR in the 1980s and the legalization of slot machines in Delaware in the mid-1990s. In 2002, ownership of the horse racing track and auto racing oval was split, with Dover Motorsports taking over the auto racing oval. Following the Great Recession in the late 2000s, the track downsized. In 2021, SMI acquired Dover Motorsports, taking control of the venue.

== Description ==
=== Configuration ===
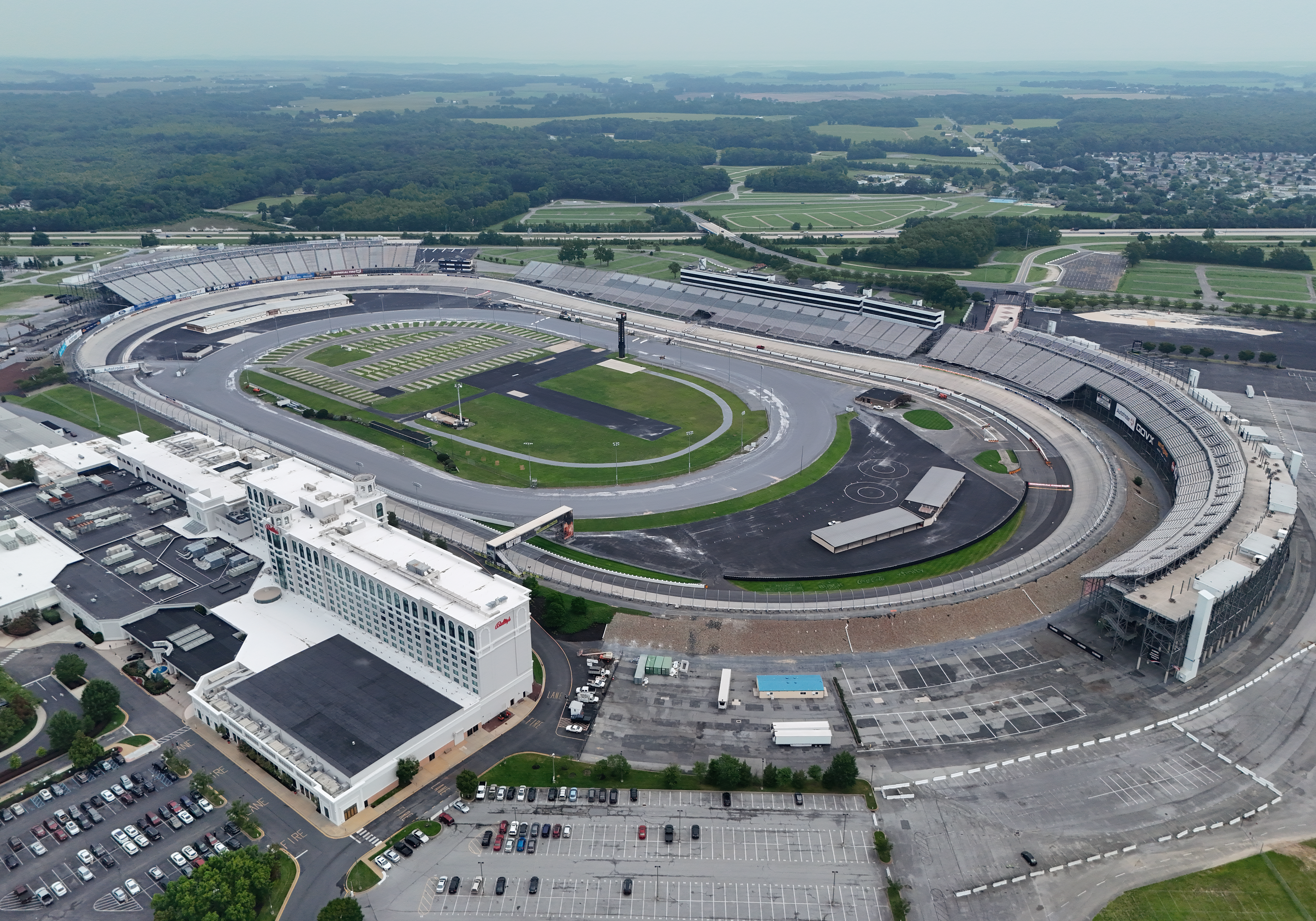
An overhead photo of Dover Motor Speedway in 2025

Dover Motor Speedway (DMS) in its current form is measured at 1.000 mi (1.609 km), with 24° of banking in the turns and 9° of banking on the track's straightaways. Located within the Dover Motor Speedway a 5/8-mile (1.0 km) horse racing track that is currently part of Bally's Dover, which is not owned by Speedway Motorsports; it is instead owned by Gaming and Leisure Properties and operated by the Bally's Corporation.

=== Amenities ===
Dover Motor Speedway is located in Dover, Delaware, and is served by U.S. Route 13 and Delaware Route 1. As of 2022, the track has a permanent seating capacity of 54,000 according to The News Journal. In addition to seating, approximately 3,000 spots dedicated to camping are also available according to a 2023 Delaware Business Times report, including overnight camping as of 2025. At its peak, DMS had a capacity of 140,000 according to a 2005 News Journal article.

==== Miles the Monster ====
Miles the Monster in its current form has served as DMS's official mascot since 2000. The description of Miles the Monster has drawn comparisons by Roadside America to The Thing and the Hulk, and was inspired by the "theme of concrete" according to Joe Heller, a former DMS PR worker. Miles was introduced in 1990 as a tyrannosaurus rex, and was reintroduced in 2000 in its current form. In 2008, the Monster Monument, a 46 ft (14 m) statue of Miles the Monster, was erected to honor past winners at DMS.

== Track history ==
=== Planning and construction ===
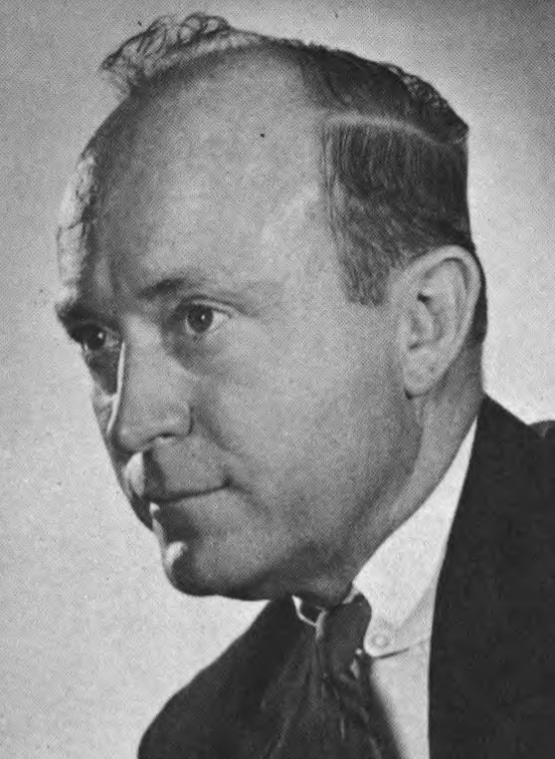
David P. Buckson (pictured in 1969), then-Attorney General of Delaware, announced the construction Dover Downs in 1967. He became the track's first president.

On June 18, 1967, David P. Buckson, the Attorney General of Delaware, announced plans of building a 5/8 mile (1.0 km) horse racing facility near U.S. Route 13 named Delaware Downs. In initial proposals, the track had a projected cost of $1.5 million (adjusted for inflation, $14,483,533), including 10,000 seats and a clubhouse with room for expansion to include a planned convention center. The plan received mostly positive reception from the Delaware General Assembly, with local lawmakers favoring changing laws that prohibited construction in order to legally build the track. After Buckson's bill, Senate Bill 201, initially experienced a delay in consideration, S.B. 201 was passed through both branches of the General Assembly on July 18 and signed into law by Delaware Governor Charles L. Terry Jr. eight days later. In September, Buckson spent just under $2 million to acquire approximately 600 acres (240 ha) of land to construct the facility.

Construction of the facility began in October, with plans expanded to include a 1-mile (1.6 km) auto racing oval around the horse racing track. However, a steel truckers' strike and picketing delayed the grandstand construction. Originally set to open on March 1, 1968, the facility's debut was postponed to March 14 at the request of Buckson, who wanted to avoid competing with Georgetown Speedway. Further delays came in February, with the opening rescheduled to early April due to the ongoing strike and a winter storm.

By April, construction completion was moved to August, and in June, multiple liens totaling at least $286,500 were filed against Dover Downs. To address these financial issues, Buckson partnered with John W. Rollins and Melvin J. Joseph to secure a $3 million financing plan, with Rollins as the primary backer and Joseph overseeing construction. This allowed the group to pay off the liens by July, and the opening was finally rescheduled for March 8, 1969. In February, Dover Downs received its horse racing license from the Delaware Racing Commission.

=== Early years and financial troubles ===
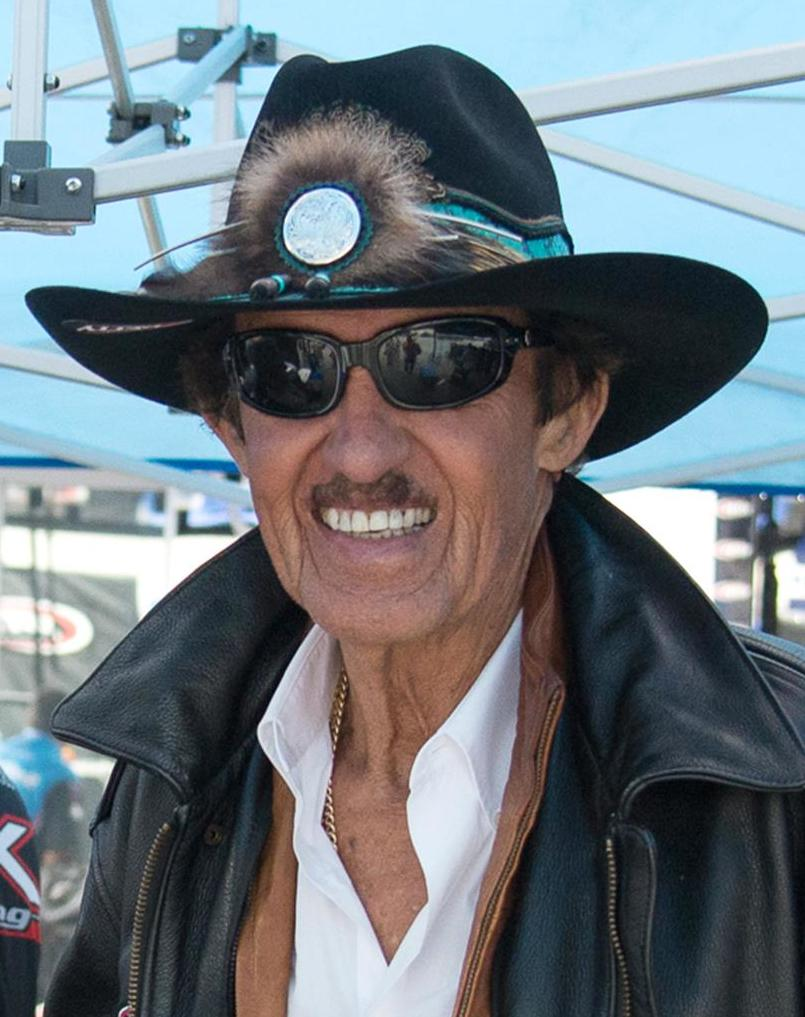
NASCAR driver Richard Petty (pictured in 2016) won the first major auto race at Dover Downs' auto racing oval on July 6, 1969.

After a year of construction delays, the $5.2 million facility held its first horse races on March 8, 1969, with Pinehurst and jockey Fred Kratz winning the first ever horse race at the Dover Downs Raceway (DDR). The following month, Dover Downs was able to secure its first auto racing dates, with the NASCAR Grand National Series scheduling a 300-mile (480 km) race on July 6. By the end of its first horse racing season in May, the facility received mixed reception from local press; in response to rumors that track leaders would abandon horse racing, Buckson stated to The Morning News that they were "ridiculous" and it will "be back here next year ready to go again". The auto racing oval, named Dover Downs International Raceway (DDIS), held its first races as scheduled, with Richard Petty winning the 1969 Mason-Dixon 300; the race faced fewer fans and traffic problems than expected. In June 1970, DDIS underwent its first repave at the cost of $50,000 (adjusted for inflation, $414,524).

In its early years, Dover Downs struggled financially. By July 1969, liens totaling over $950,000 were filed against the facility. In April 1970, McNutt Electric Company, one of the lienholders, sued Dover Downs for unpaid bills. By August, Dover Downs settled the liens, paying $965,000 in total. In 1973, it faced a near-boycott by the Cloverleaf Standardbred Owners Association, who demanded an 8% purse increase and new paddock facilities. Although track leaders initially refused due to costs, an agreement was eventually reached. With attendance below expectations in early 1974, track general manager John Riddle acknowledged the facility's financial difficulties, stating that "I must admit that we are in a serious financial situation... I know we can't continue to operate in a deficit situation." Buckson proposed dog racing and a tax relief bill to improve finances in January 1974; although the House approved the bill, it was vetoed by Sherman W. Tribbitt. In August, Buckson's salary was cut, and he was reassigned as chairman, with Riddle stepping in as president. In September, Riddle announced Dover Downs was for sale but denied impending bankruptcy. Despite DDR's issues, DDIS remained profitable, with The Morning News noting that auto racing was unaffected by the complex's financial troubles.

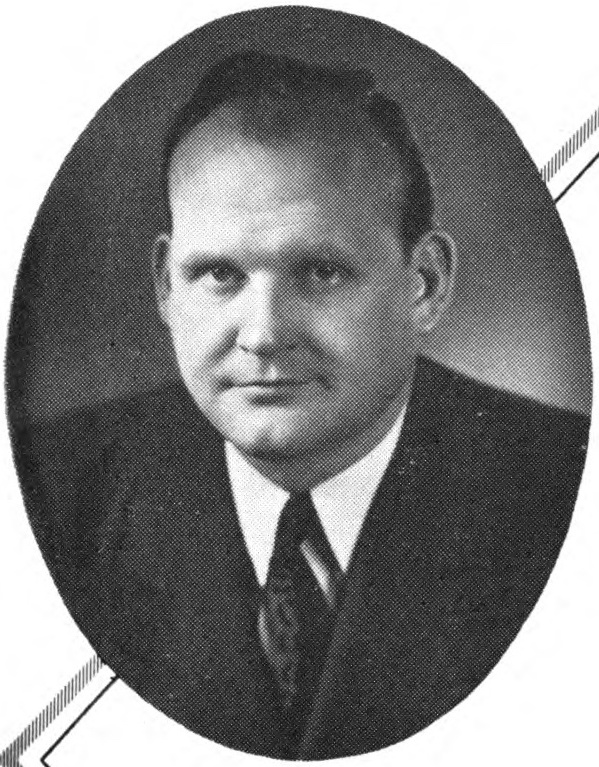
John W. Rollins, former owner of Dover Downs, often provided emergency financial backing to Dover Downs despite its financial troubles, helping the facility continue to operate in the 1970s.

In 1975, a tax break bill passed to assist Dover Downs if it resumed thoroughbred racing, easing some financial pressure. However, a year later, auditors found Dover Downs owed $49,000 (adjusted for inflation, $277,237) in unpaid admission taxes. In the winter of 1977, attendance dropped 16% due to new horse racing tracks. Later that year, the Federal Bureau of Investigation (FBI) investigated possible race-fixing at the track. After Governor Pete du Pont vetoed an initial tax break bill in October, another bill was proposed, this time with state officials involved. Du Pont agreed to sign it only if he could release Dover Downs' financial records, which the track's owner, Riddle, had previously refused. In a controversial decision, du Pont approved the $500,000 (adjusted for inflation, $2,468,112) annual tax break on February 21. Despite the approval, Riddle later admitted the track would still see a small loss. In April 1979, Riddle resigned to join NASCAR as their executive vice president. Riddle maintained that he thought the track was in a stable financial state, proclaiming that "I really believe that this racetrack is solid and will continue to be so for many years." However, owner John W. Rollins said he had not made profit on the track, noting his financial support had kept it afloat.

=== Denis McGlynn era, Dover Downs expansion ===
==== DDIS' mass expansion ====
In November 1979, director of operations Denis McGlynn was named as Riddle's replacement for president of Dover Downs. Heading into the 1980s, the facility experienced continued financial woes, with McGlynn reporting "significant" losses since 1981 in a March 1983 interview. In September 1982, Rollins offered the city of Dover to purchase the entirety of Dover Downs for $5 million (adjusted for inflation, $16,162,713). Later that year, DDR underwent renovations, adding betting windows and color televisions. In April 1983, McGlynn tried to negotiate with the city to lower the buying cost of Dover Downs to $1.9 million; however, the proposal was rejected. Attendance at DDR also continued to drop with the construction of Rosecroft Raceway in 1984, with the track reporting an over 10% decrease in average attendance from the previous year. Later that year in May, in response to rising attendance and subsequent complaints about a lack of seating at DDIS, McGlynn announced a long-term expansion plan to retain its NASCAR races. Two years later, DDIS was repaved following complaints from NASCAR drivers and crew chiefs. The repave process started in May and was completed by September of that year, costing approximately $500,000.

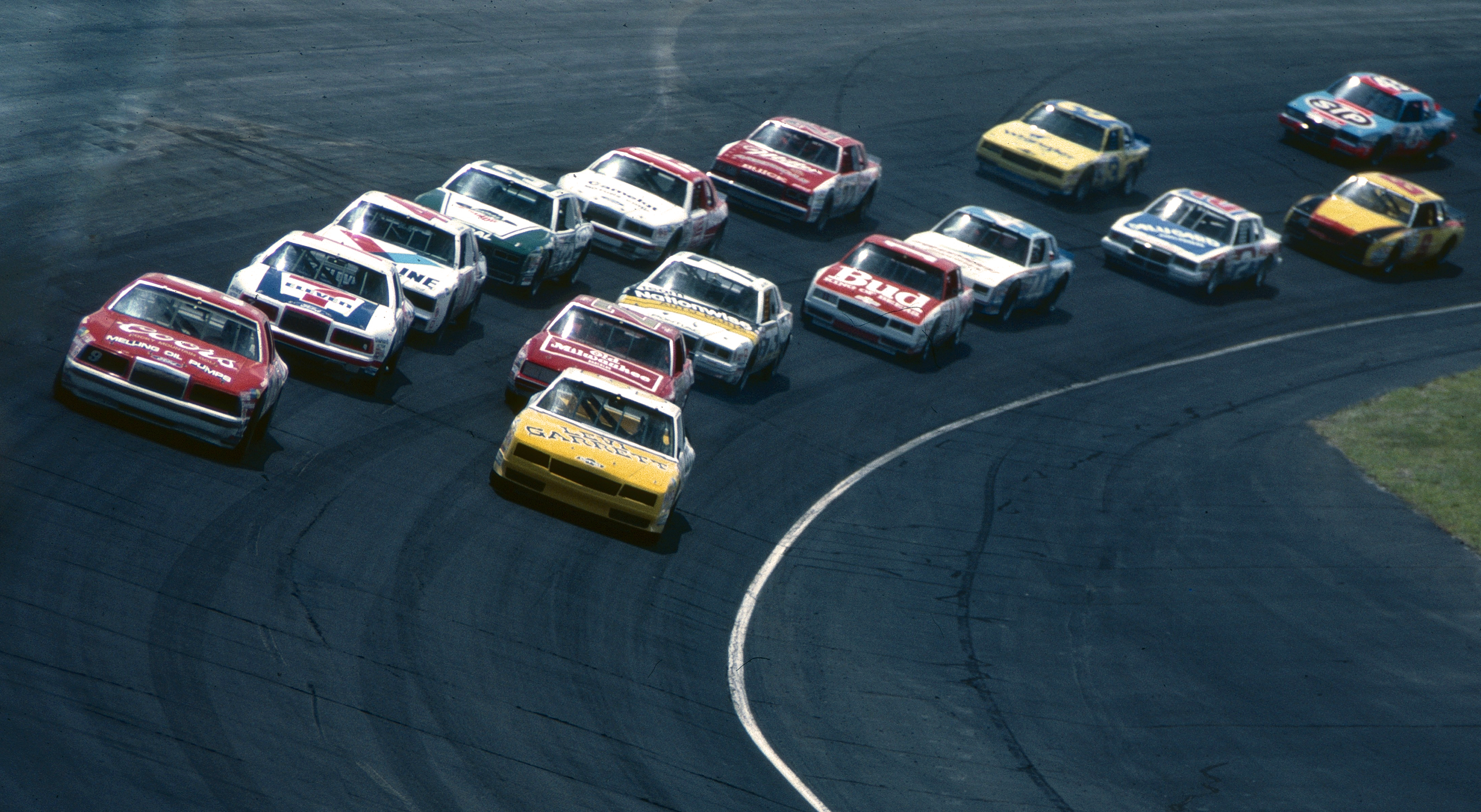
NASCAR racing at Dover Motor Speedway's asphalt surface in 1985. In 1995, the track surface was changed to concrete, which still remains today.

Starting in the mid-1980s, Dover Downs International Speedway expanded drastically. In 1986 and 1987, 3,200 new seats were added for each year. The following year, 5,100 seats were added near DDIS's main grandstand, increasing seating capacity to 41,000. In March 1989, a new media center and 5,100 seats were completed, with a further 3,800 seats being announced. By the end of the decade, renovations were made to victory lane, restrooms, pit road, and the garages. In April 1991, a 5,383-seat grandstand was erected overseeing the track's fourth turn. Further expansions of 5,000, 4,750, 6,650, and 6,950 seats were approved by the Dover Planning Commission in 1991, 1992, 1993, and 1994, respectively, increasing capacity to 73,502. In November 1994, alongside further construction of 7,050 seats, track officials announced a $1.8 million complete repaving of DDIS' track surface, this time replacing the traditional asphalt surface with concrete. Paving started in November and was completed in March 1995. In October 1996, the city of Dover approved a master plan to allow the track to build 73,178 additional seats over the course of seven years, with the plan increasing capacity to 170,000. However, by 2005, only 140,000 seats were installed.

==== Fight for legalization of slot machines in Delaware, subsequent DDR recovery and hotel construction ====
In contrast to DDIS' rapid expansions, Dover Downs Raceway alongside the state of Delawarean horse racing faced heavy turmoil in the late 1980s and most of the 1990s. In 1989, alongside other horse racing tracks in Delaware, McGlynn started to advocate publicly for the legalization of slot machines in the state of Delaware. A bill to legalize slot machines in Delaware, H.B. 297, was passed by both chambers of the Delaware Legislature by June 30. However, then-Delaware Governor Mike Castle vetoed the bill in the summer of the same year. Five years later, despite threats of another veto from Castle's successor Tom Carper, another push for legalization was made in early 1994 after the closure of Brandywine Raceway in 1990 and further economic turmoil due to H.B. 297's veto. Another bill, H.B. 443, was passed by June 1994 by both chambers but was again vetoed; however, Carper stated that he was open to compromise. A rewritten bill, H.B. 628 that allowed the state to take a bigger share of profits and required slot machines to be relicensed every four years, was passed by both chambers, with Carper allowing the bill to become law without his signature.

Although McGlynn initially stated that he would not install slot machines due to a lack of profit for Dover Downs, Rollins was able to convince McGlynn otherwise, with plans to install 500 machines in March 1995. However, the installation was delayed by months, with test runs not occurring until December 22 and the official opening occurring seven days later. In the first months of slot machines, Dover Downs and Delaware Park Racetrack both experienced increased profit, with Dover Downs expanding their number of slot machines to 1,000 to accommodate increased demand. By November 1996, $800,000 worth of renovations were invested into a reinvigorated and financially stable DDR, with McGlynn praising Rollins in a News Journal interview. In March 1999, a 22,000 square feet (2,000 m^{2}) expansion to increase the amount of slot machines to 1,568 was completed.

Discussions on building a hotel to make Dover Downs an "entertainment destination" were recorded as far back as March 1998, with McGlynn stating that building a hotel "would make sense". On August 25, 1999, the News Journal reported that Dover Downs Entertainment had submitted plans for a 520-room four star hotel to the Dover Planning Commission for approval, with construction taking place in two 260-room phases if approved. The hotel was approved on September 20. The first phase of the hotel was scheduled to open on February 8, 2002; although it did open on time, the opening was affected by a flood on the top floor of the hotel caused by an open pipe.

=== Post-Dover Downs split ===
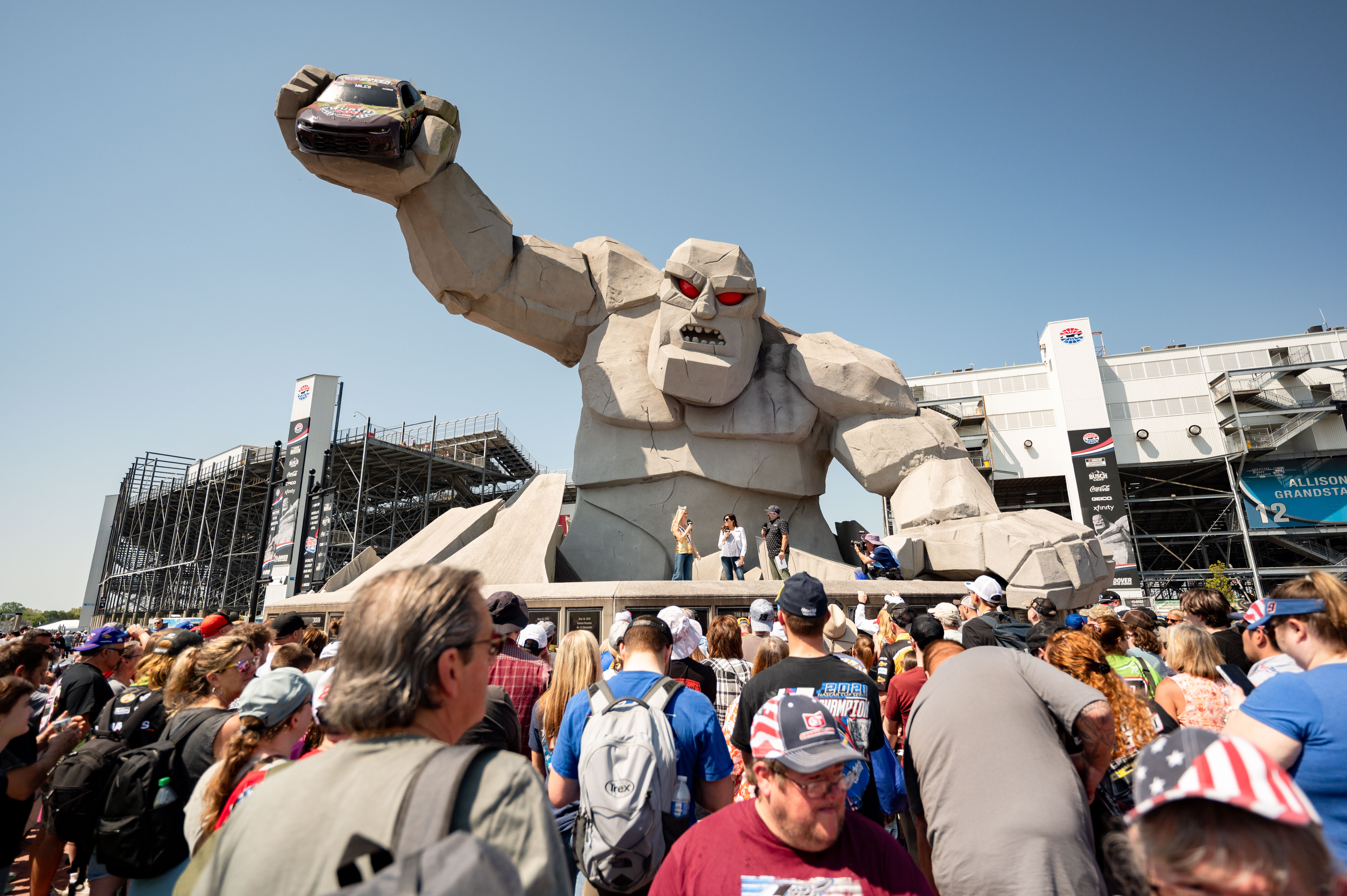
The Monster Monument (pictured in 2024), featuring a 46-foot (14 m) Miles the Monster. The Monster Monument, built in 2008, was part of a multi-year renovation project aimed at beautifying the facility.

In July 2001, McGlynn stated hopes to separate Dover Downs' auto racing business and its horse racing and casino business as two separate companies, with the casino and horse racing facilities being named under Dover Downs Gaming & Entertainment. The split was completed in April 2002, with the auto racing facility now being owned by Dover Motorsports, Inc. As part of the split, the auto racing facility changed its name to Dover International Speedway (DIS). In 2004, DIS started the process of installing of SAFER barriers to increase track safety. The project was faced with engineering difficulties but was eventually completed in time for the 2005 MBNA RacePoints 400. In May 2006, McGlynn announced a five-year renovation plan for DIS, focused on expanding amenities around the track's property along with expanding the width of DIS' pit road. The project was split into three phases. The first phase of the project was completed in time for the 2007 Autism Speaks 400, with additional parking and luxury seating options being constructed. Phase two was completed by the 2008 Camping World RV 400, which included the construction of a monument honoring past winners at DIS alongside an expanded fan zone. Phase three of the project, an extension of the track's pit road, was completed by the 2009 Autism Speaks 400, extending it by 432 feet (132 m). In 2014, Mike Tatoian, chief operating officer of Dover Motorsports, was assigned to replace McGlynn as president of DIS, with McGlynn remaining as the president of Dover Motorsports. The following year, track developers spent $2.9 million to install a new, 21-foot (6.4 m) catchfence to replace the track's old 15-foot (4.6 m) catchfence.

==== Capacity decline, change in ownership ====
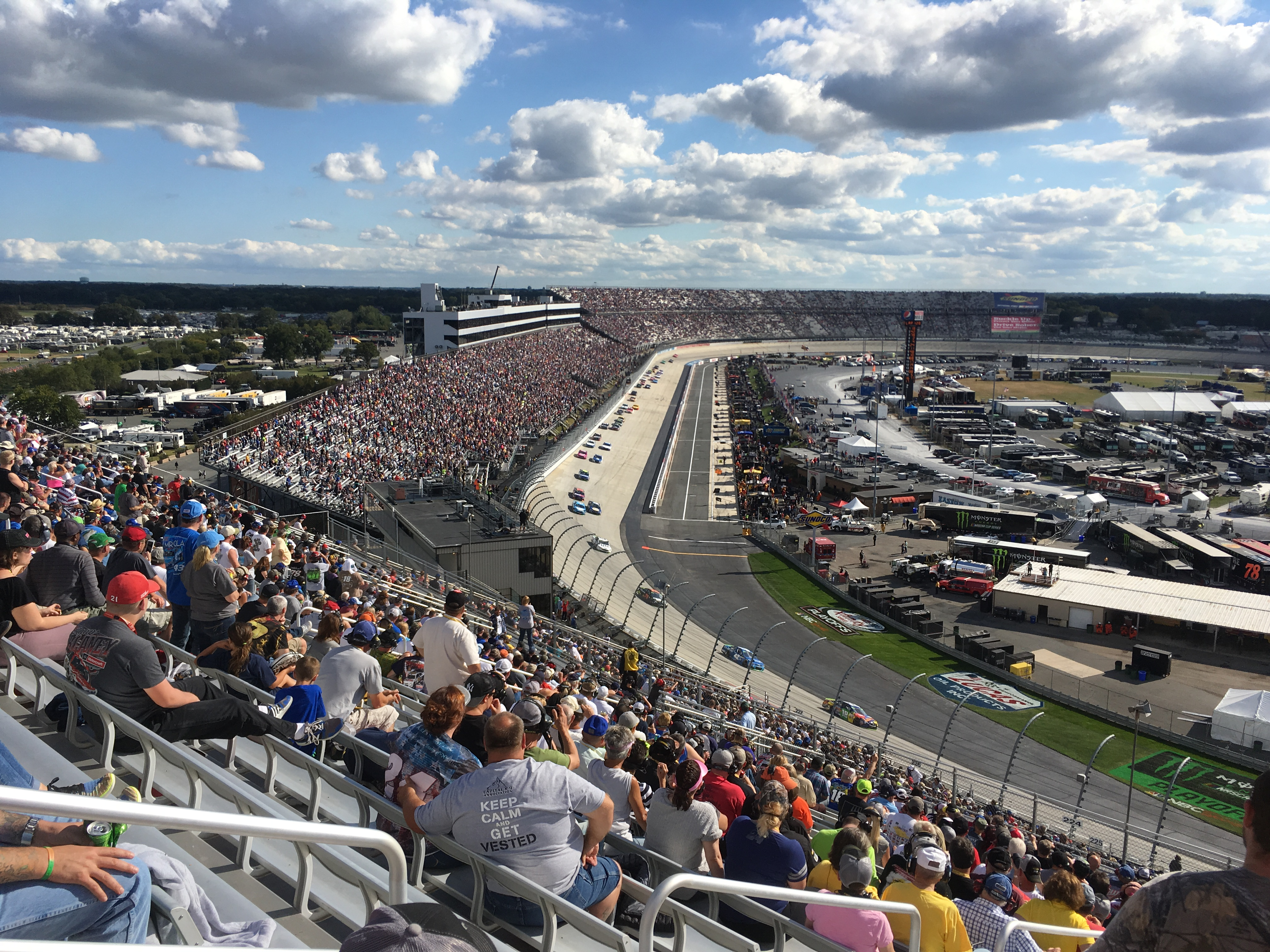
NASCAR Cup Series race at Dover Motor Speedway in October 2017

Starting in the late 2000s, DIS experienced capacity and economic decline. In May 2009, seating capacity was decreased by approximately 7,000. By 2011, attendance at DIS' NASCAR Cup Series races had dropped to under 90,000, over 50,000 less than what attendance was at its peak; the drop was blamed on economic effects of the Great Recession. In 2012, developers initiated a seat-widening plan, with capacity decreasing from 132,000 to 113,000. By the 2015 FedEx 400, DIS decreased seating capacity to 95,500 in response to further attendance downturn at DIS. A further 10,500 seats were torn down in time for the 2017 AAA 400 Drive for Autism, reducing capacity to 85,000. Two years later, seating capacity was dropped to 54,000 in response to a further decline of demand according to McGlynn.

In May 2019, DIS began work on a $5.5 million project focused on expanding its garage surface area by 20%; the project was completed in time for the 2019 Drydene 400. In December 2021, ownership of the track changed hands when Dover Motorsports was bought out by Speedway Motorsports, LLC (SMI) for $131.5 million. As part of the purchase, the track's name changed to Dover Motor Speedway.

== Events ==
=== Racing ===
==== NASCAR ====
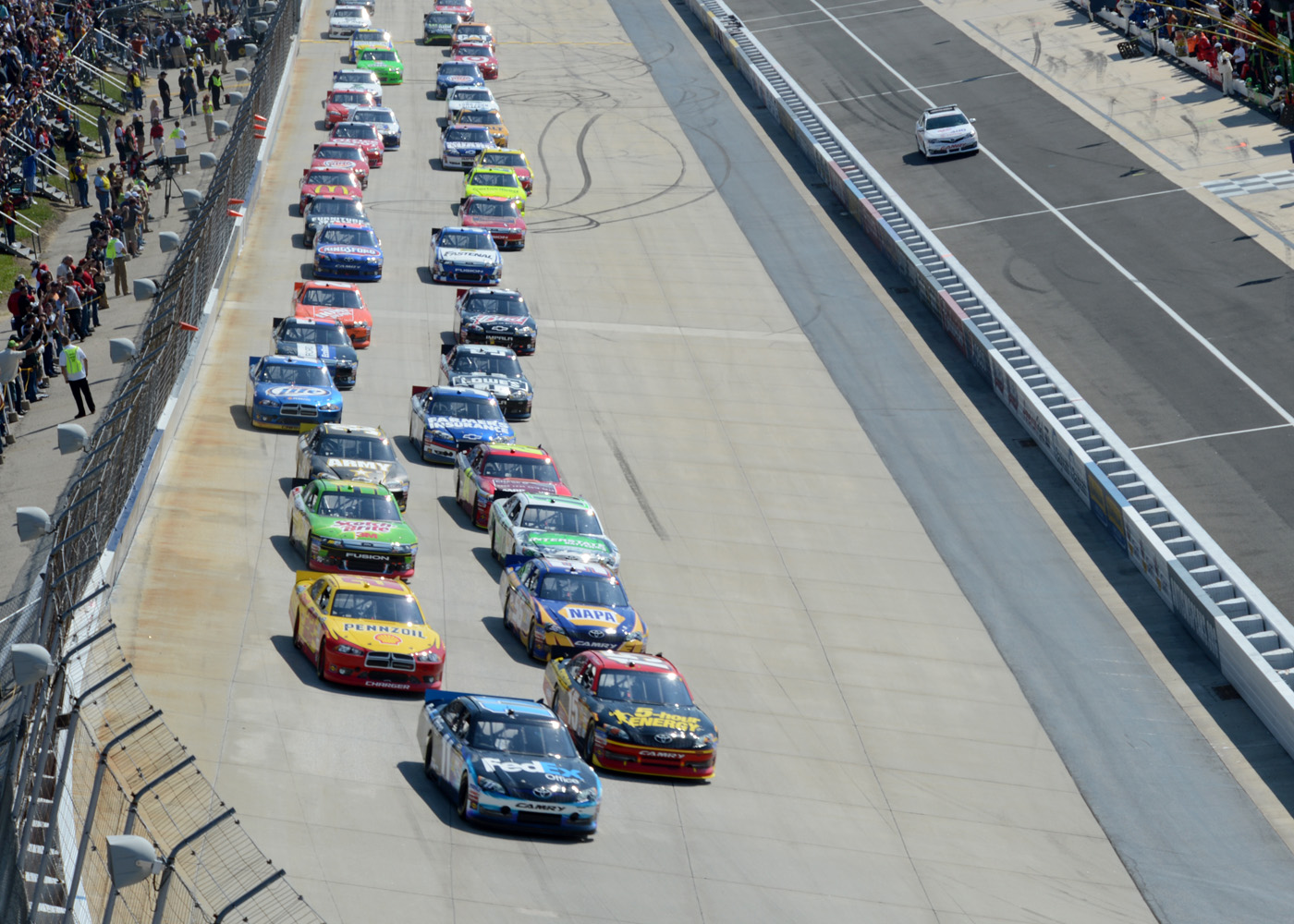
NASCAR racing at Dover Motor Speedway in 2012. Since 1969, DMS has held NASCAR Cup Series races at the facility.

DMS hosts one annual NASCAR weekend, highlighted by a NASCAR Cup Series race known as Autotrader EchoPark Automotive 400. DMS formally held a exhibition race known as the NASCAR All-Star Race. The track also hosts two point-paying races with the NASCAR O'Reilly Auto Parts Series' BetRivers 200 and the NASCAR Truck Series' Ecosave 200.

==== Other racing events ====
In 1969, DMS ran a one-off United States Auto Club (USAC) open-wheel event, with Art Pollard winning the event. While a 10-year deal was signed with USAC in 1970, the race was cancelled that same year due to complaints from driver Mike Mosley that the track was unsafe after Mosley ran tests at the facility.

In 1998, the facility began running Indy Racing League (IRL) races. However, after one more iteration in 1999, the race was scrapped heading into the new millennium, with poor attendance being cited as the main reason for the failure to renew.

=== Non-racing events ===
- Starting in 2012, the Firefly Music Festival was held at DMS. With one exception in 2020 due to the COVID-19 pandemic, the event was held annually until 2023, when the event went on hiatus.
- Since 2022, the facility has hosted Gift of Lights, a drive-thru Christmas lights display that features 3.5 million total Christmas lights during the Christmas season.

== Lap records ==
As of May 2026, the fastest official race lap records at Dover Motor Speedway are listed as:

Category	Time	Driver	Vehicle	Event
Oval (1969–present): 1.000 mi (1.609 km)
Indy Racing League	0:19.622	Greg Ray	Dallara IR-7	1998 Pep Boys 400K
NASCAR Cup	0:22.203	Chase Elliott	Chevrolet Camaro ZL1	2019 Gander RV 400
ARCA Menards	0:22.846	Carson Kvapil	Chevrolet Camaro SS	2024 General Tire 150
NASCAR Truck	0:23.149	Kyle Busch	Chevrolet Silverado	2026 Ecosave 200
NASCAR Xfinity	0:23.261	Jesse Love	Chevrolet Camaro SS	2024 BetRivers 200
