= Dallara IR-7 =

Open-wheel formula racing car built by Dallara

Dallara IR-7 Dallara IR-8 Dallara IR-9
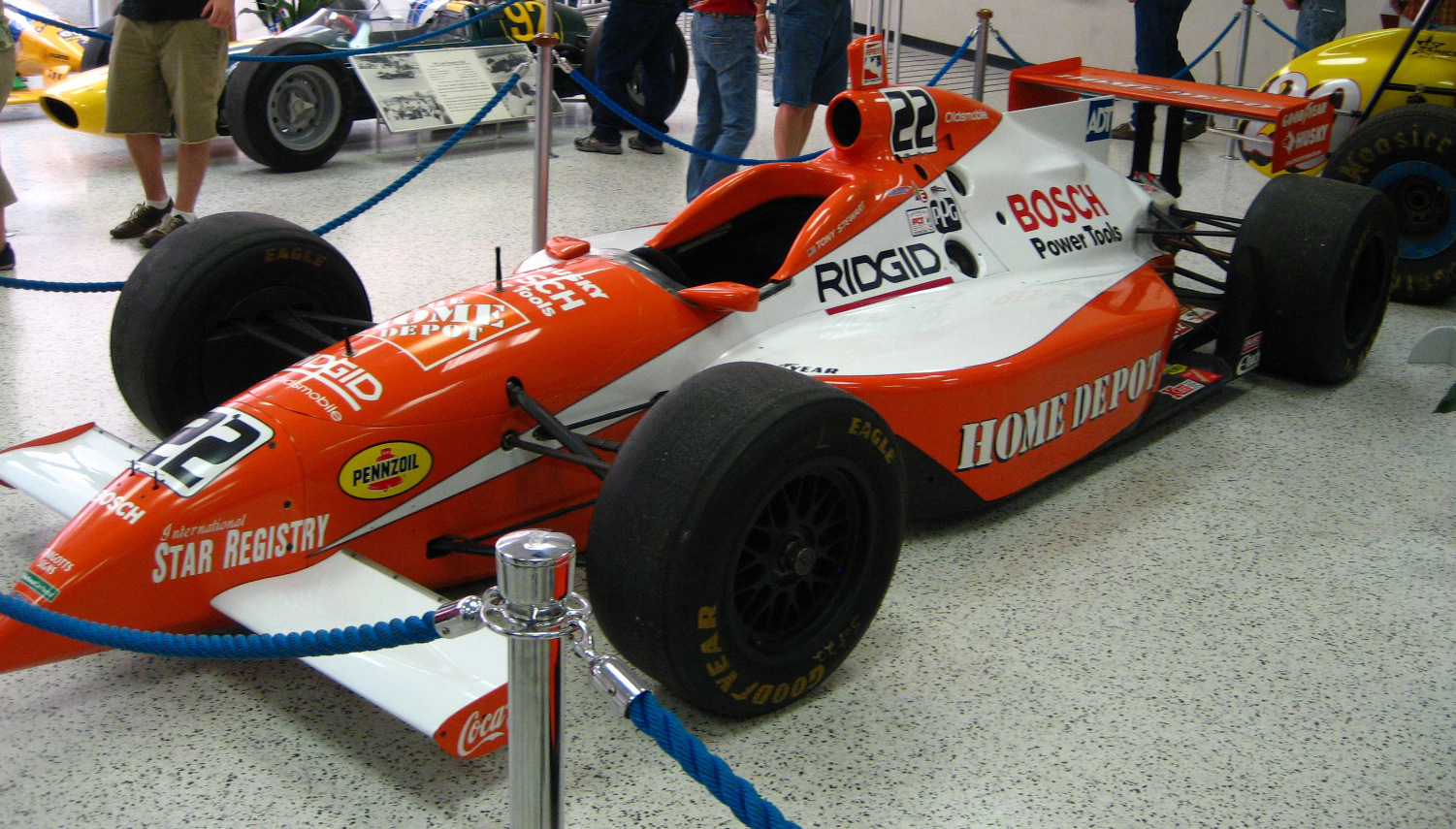
- Category: Indy Racing League
- Constructor: Dallara
- Successor: Dallara IR-00

Technical specifications
- Chassis: Carbon fiber monocoque with honeycomb structure
- Suspension (front): double wishbones, pull rod actuated coil springs over shock absorbers
- Suspension (rear): double wishbones, pull rod actuated coil springs over shock absorbers
- Length: 192–196 in (4,877–4,978 mm)
- Width: 77.5–78.5 in (1,968–1,994 mm) minimum (Road/Street)
- Wheelbase: 118–122 in (2,997–3,099 mm)
- Engine: Infiniti; Oldsmobile 4.0 L (244 cu in) 90° N/A V8 DOHC with 4-stroke piston Otto cycle mid-engined, longitudinally-mounted
- Transmission: Emco EGB-16 6-speed sequential
- Power: ~ 700–750 hp (522–559 kW)
- Weight: 1,550 lb (703 kg)
- Fuel: 100% methanol
- Lubricants: Various per teams
- Tyres: Firestone Firehawk

Competition history
- Debut: 1997 Indy 200 at Walt Disney World

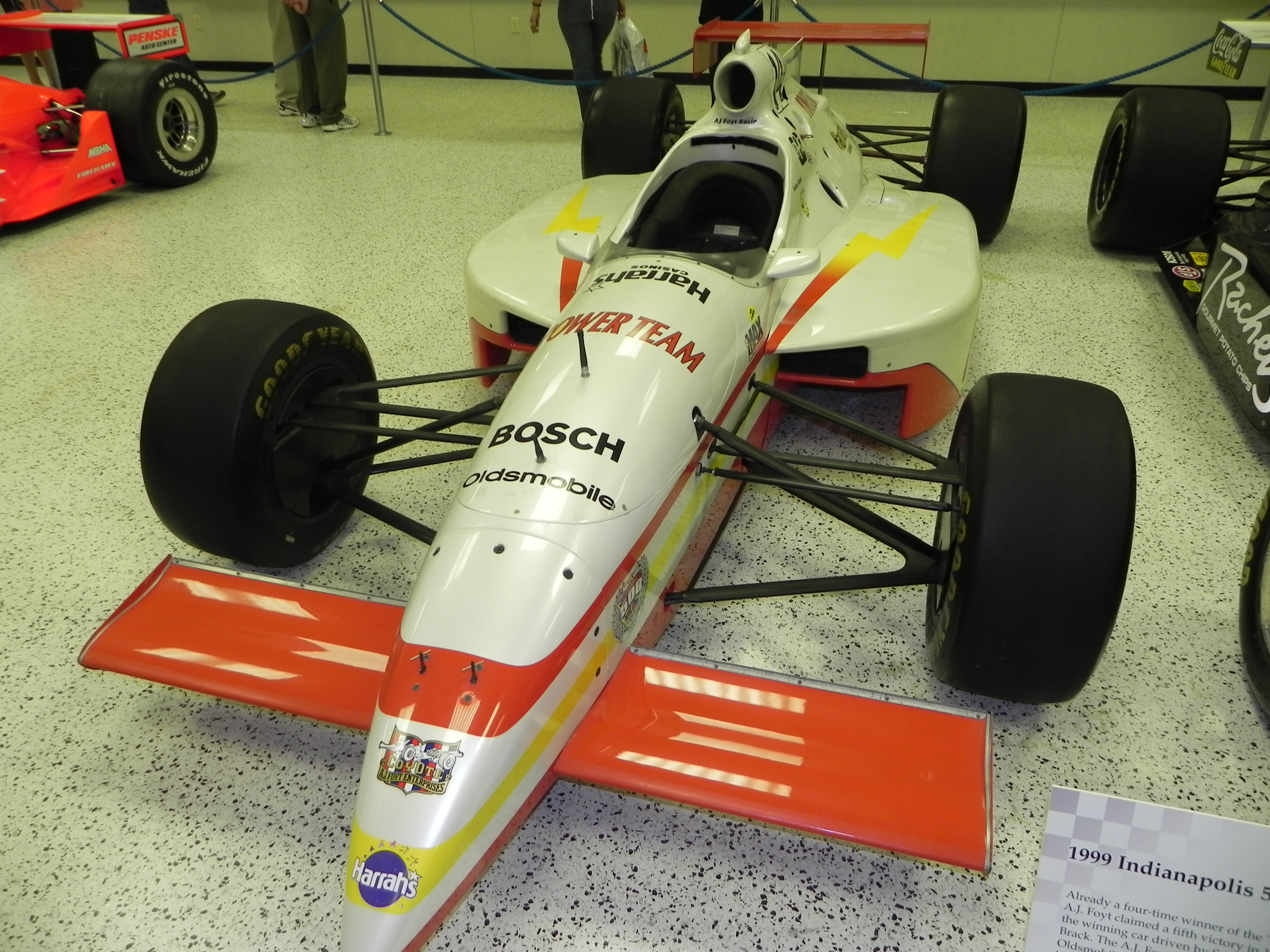
1999 Indianapolis 500-winning car of Kenny Bräck

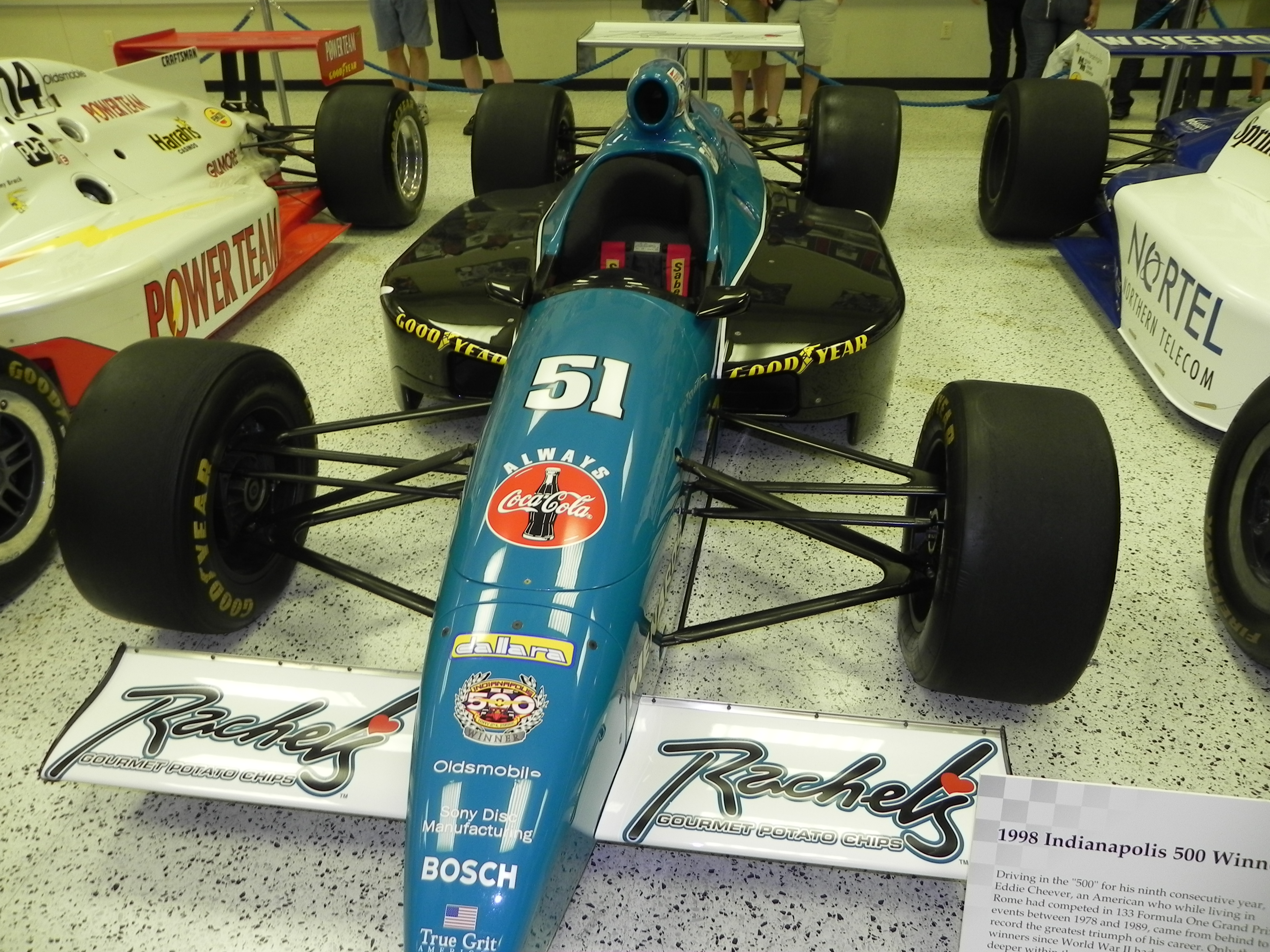
1998 Indianapolis 500-winning car

The Dallara IR-7 and its evolutions, the Dallara IR-8 and Dallara IR-9, are open-wheel formula racing cars, designed, developed, and produced by the Italian manufacturer Dallara for use in the IndyCar Series between 1997 and 1999.
