= 1996 Indianapolis 500 =

American motor race

80th Indianapolis 500
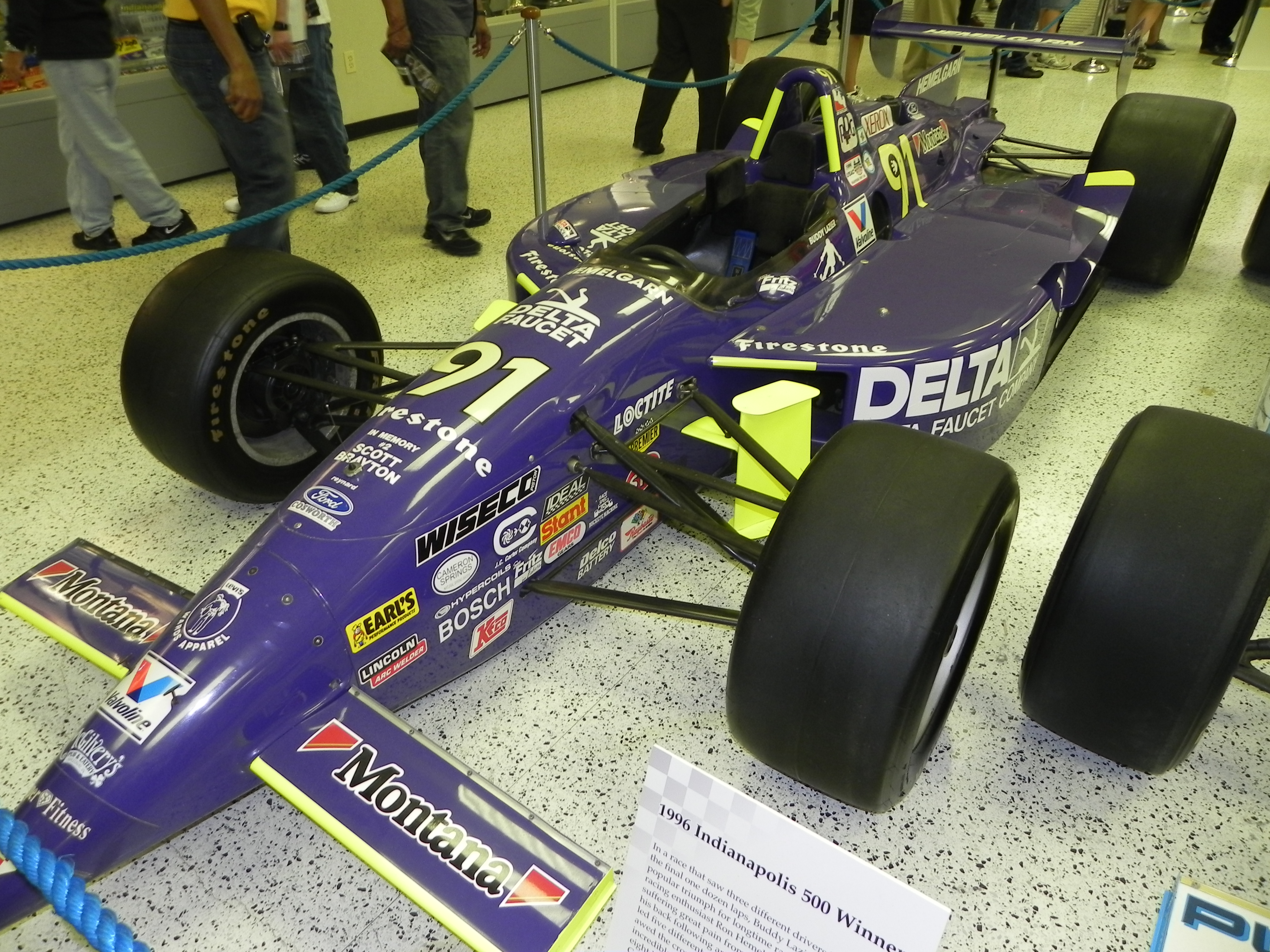

Indianapolis Motor Speedway

Indianapolis 500
- Sanctioning body: USAC/IRL
- Season: 1996 IRL season
- Date: May 26, 1996
- Winner: (United States) Buddy Lazier
- Winning team: Hemelgarn Racing
- Winning Chief Mechanic: Mark Shambarger
- Time of race: 3:22:45.753
- Average speed: 147.956 mph
- Pole position: (United States) Tony Stewart
- Pole speed: 233.718 mph
- Fastest qualifier: (Netherlands) Arie Luyendyk (236.986 mph)
- Rookie of the Year: (United States) Tony Stewart
- Most laps led: (Colombia) Roberto Guerrero (47)

Pre-race ceremonies
- National anthem: Florence Henderson
- "Back Home Again in Indiana": Jim Nabors
- Starting command: Mary F. Hulman
- Pace car: Dodge Viper GTS
- Pace car driver: Bob Lutz
- Starter: Duane Sweeney
- Honorary starter: Robert James Eaton
- Estimated attendance: 300,000

Television in the United States
- Network: ABC
- Announcers: Paul Page, Danny Sullivan, and Bobby Unser
- Nielsen ratings: 7.1 / 23

Chronology
Previous	Next
1995	1997

The 80th Indianapolis 500 was held at the Indianapolis Motor Speedway in Speedway, Indiana on Sunday, May 26, 1996. This was the first Indy 500 contested as part of the new Indy Racing League, under the overall sanctioning umbrella of USAC. It was the third and final race of the 1996 IRL season. Veteran driver and 1988 AIS champion Buddy Lazier won the race, his first career victory in top-level Indy car competition. It came just over two months after Lazier suffered a broken back in a crash at Phoenix. Lazier's victory marks the last (as of 2026) Indy victory for Ford, and the second of two all-time victories for Reynard. It was also the first victory for Firestone tires since 1971.

The race was surrounded by months of controversy, and was a key component of "the Split", the name given in racing circles to the twelve-year organizational dispute in American open-wheel racing between the upstart Indy Racing League (IRL) and the established Championship Auto Racing Teams (CART). The debate centered around the 25/8 Rule, which reserved 25 spots in the 33-car starting grid for the top 25 drivers/entries in IRL points during the previous races. In addition, 1996 model-year chassis and engines were not approved for competition. Citing a perceived lockout, almost all of the CART teams chose to boycott the event, including Penske, Ganassi, Newman/Haas, Rahal, and many others. As a further protest, CART scheduled a competing race the same day, the U.S. 500 at Michigan International Speedway.

Most of the top teams and drivers in Indy car racing sided with CART. However, participants in the 1996 Indy 500 included several familiar teams and owners such as A.J. Foyt, Dick Simon, Hemelgarn, and Menard, along with many new teams, some of which moved up from Indy Lights, AIS, or sports cars. More than half of the drivers entered were rookies, some from an obscure range of racing backgrounds, giving the impression of a field of replacement drivers. There was only one former Indy 500 winner in the field (Arie Luyendyk), and three former pole position winners entered. In addition, there were no former national champions in the field for the first time since 1928.

During practice, the month activity was marred by the death of pole position winner Scott Brayton, who was killed on May 17, while testing a back-up car. The month was plagued by rain, as May 1996 was the fifth-wettest month of May at Indianapolis on record, and the fourth-wettest month of May in Indy 500 history. Off the track, this would also be the final "500" in which Mary F. Hulman delivered the starting command. The widow of Tony Hulman, and chairman of the board emeritus of the Indianapolis Motor Speedway, Hulman died April 10, 1998.

This was the final year of the turbocharged engine formula that had dominated the race since the late-1960s. The IRL/IndyCar would switch to normally-aspirated engines for 1997–2011. The track had been newly repaved, and all-time track record speeds were set during practice and time trials. Arie Luyendyk set the official one-lap track record (237.498 mph), the four-lap track record (236.986 mph), and the fastest practice lap in Indy history (239.260 mph) just a fraction of a second shy of breaking the 240 mph barrier, while Eddie Cheever ran the fastest race lap (236.103 mph) in Indy 500 history – records that all still stand as of 2025.

The field was filled to the traditional 33 cars, but only one car was bumped (then-unknown Billy Boat). A total of 17 rookies qualified for the race, a post-WWII record, led by reigning USAC Silver Crown, Sprint and Midget champion Tony Stewart, the future IRL and NASCAR champion. Stewart qualified for the front row, was elevated to the on pole position due to Brayton's death, and took home rookie of the year honors. While comprising half the field, only two rookies managed to finish in the top ten.

Media attention of the open wheel "split" was highly critical going into the race, as a number of the IRL participants were ridiculed and the prestige of the Indianapolis 500 itself was brought into question. The "split" embittered a significant portion of the fanbase, and journalist Robin Miller of The Indianapolis Star was among the most outspoken of critics. However, the race itself was found to be competitive and entertaining, while the rival U.S. 500 suffered a multi-car pile-up prior to the green flag.

== Background ==
=== IRL/CART split ===
See also 1996 Indy Racing League season

The IRL/CART "Split" stemmed from earlier issues of USAC and CART sanctioning of Indy car racing since the 1970s. The first USAC/CART "split" in 1979 had already caused major controversy in the sport. Unsatisfied with the way USAC was running and promoting the sport, a group of owners broke off and formed Championship Auto Racing Teams (CART), a new sanctioning body to run Indy car racing. As retribution, USAC rejected the entries for six key CART teams into the 1979 Indianapolis 500. A court injunction was filed to allow the teams to compete, and though under layers of controversy, the race was run without further major disruption. Two separate championship seasons were contested in 1979, one by USAC and one by CART. Though the Indy 500 was sanctioned by USAC, it paid points towards the CART championship.

A short-lived truce came about in 1980 under the Championship Racing League (CRL) banner, which ended acrimoniously halfway through the season. USAC unsuccessfully tried to revive their own championship, and therefore the Indianapolis 500 did not pay points towards the CART title in either 1981 or 1982. By that point, the "500" was the lone paved championship race sanctioned by USAC. Nevertheless, CART entrants comprised the majority, while other part-time or "Indy only" entries competed mostly on a one-off basis.

An arrangement was put in place to recognize the Indianapolis 500 on the CART schedule starting in 1983, with USAC remaining as the sanctioning body for the event singly. The Indy 500 would be contested by the CART-based teams, along with numerous part-time and "Indy only" entries. Stability returned, and the sport settled into a relative harmony through 1995. Rules between the two sanctioning bodies were largely similar, and for the most part, the same chassis and engines were used by both, with only minor technical differences.

In the early 1990s, newly named Indianapolis Motor Speedway president Tony George began exploring options of changes in the sport of Indy cars. Sharply rising costs, the lack of many ovals on the schedule, and the dwindling number of American participants were among his stated concerns. As early as May 1991, George announced intentions to change the engine formula to 3.5 L (210 in^{3}) normally aspirated powerplants (very similar to the engines used in Formula One and Group C at the time), a proposal that never got past the planning stages. George joined the CART board of directors in 1992 as a non-voting member, but resigned in 1994 due to disagreements with the direction of the series and a lack of influence in prospective changes.

In the summer of 1994, George announced that the Indianapolis Motor Speedway would create its own series, the Indy Racing League, with the Indianapolis 500 as its centerpiece. George blueprinted the new series as a lower-cost alternative to CART, with an emphasis on attracting American grassroots drivers, an all-oval schedule, and new cars from 1997 with normally-aspirated, "production-based" engines, targeting a reduction in performance. As a result, the Indy 500 would no longer be recognized on the CART calendar, and machines used in the CART series would no longer be allowed at the Speedway starting in 1997. Furthermore, due to a planned "rules freeze", CART's 1996 model year chassis and engines were excluded as well.

Almost immediately, a turbulent political controversy erupted, with participants, media, fans, manufacturers, and sponsors all apprehensive of the sport's direction and pending shakeup. The prevailing opinion around the CART paddock was largely negative regarding the formation of the IRL. The 1995 season and 1995 Indy 500 were held as normal, but under a growing cloud of uncertainty about the future of the sport. During the summer of 1995, and into the offseason, the two factions of CART and the IRL were unable to reconcile on much of anything, and the "split" began to take shape. The biggest salvo was made on July 3, 1995, when IRL officials announced that the top 25 drivers in IRL points would be guaranteed starting positions in the 1996 Indy 500 (see 25/8 Rule and locked-in entries).

=== Boycott by CART teams ===
Throughout much of the summer and fall of 1995, CART teams were generally ambivalent regarding the formation of the IRL and expressed no interest in participating in any IRL race other than Indianapolis. CART announced their 1996 schedule on June 10, 1995, which initially featured no races in May and an open date on Memorial Day weekend. The IRL put together five races for 1996, with the Indianapolis 500, former CART series venues Phoenix and Loudon, along with two new races at Walt Disney World and Las Vegas. The plan was to have split-calendar seasons, such that the season would end at the Indy 500. The 1996 season would consist of three races: WDW, Phoenix, and Indy. Loudon and Las Vegas would be part of the 1996–97 season

While no direct conflicts with the three-race 1996 IRL schedule were created, CART scheduled international races at Rio and Australia the weekend before and the weekend after the IRL race at Phoenix, respectively. With lengthy and logistically complicated international trips bookending Phoenix, there would be no realistic way for the CART teams to participate in that event. Since they were not planning to enter any other IRL events, the CART-based teams would be "Indy 500 only" entries, and not be eligible for guaranteed spots as part of the 25/8 rule.

In November 1995, Penske Racing (who failed to qualify at the 1995 race), and other CART teams participated in a private tire test at Indy. Meanwhile, rumors began circulating of a planned boycott, and a possible competing event. When invitations were sent out by the IRL management, all CART teams were included in the distribution.

On December 18, 1995 CART teams, convinced they were being deliberately locked out from the 1996 Indy 500, and the victims of a "power grab" by Tony George, announced their intentions to boycott the event. They jointly announced plans for a new race, the Inaugural U.S. 500, to be held at Michigan International Speedway the same day.

The official reaction from IMS/IRL was one of disappointment and dismay, suggesting that CART was preparing to do considerable damage to Indy car racing. CART participants were convinced of the opposite. The only CART teams that entered were Galles and Walker, but neither fielded their regular full-time CART drivers. Galles entered an Ilmor Mercedes-Benz 265-D (the only Mercedes entered) in a one-off entry for its test driver Davy Jones, while Walker fielded a car for Mike Groff, who raced with the team in Nazareth a week before practice began as a warm-up event. Out of the 33 starters from the previous edition, only 11 drivers re-entered the event, with Eliseo Salazar (4th) and Arie Luyendyk (7th) being the only top 10 finishers from 1995.

Irrespective of the "split", defending Indy 500 winner Jacques Villeneuve switched to Formula One and signed with the Williams team during the offseason. For the second year in a row, the defending champion would not race in the 500, as 1994 winner Al Unser Jr. had failed to qualify the previous year. With the recent retirements of several Indy legends, as well as active drivers racing at Michigan instead like Bobby Rahal, Emerson Fittipaldi (whose career would end in July due to a crash at the Marlboro 500) and Unser Jr., the only former Indy winner would be Arie Luyendyk. Additionally, the U.S. 500 field represented 109 Indy 500 starts and 5 wins, compared to just 75 previous 500 starts for the 1996 Indy 500 lineup; the lowest since 1932. The U.S. 500 competitors also accounted for 127 CART and USAC-sanctioned IndyCar wins and 7 National Championships, while the Indy 500 drivers had only 14 wins and no National Championships among the 33 starters.

=== 25/8 Rule and locked-in entries ===
For the 1996 Indy 500, the "25/8 Rule" was adopted, where 25 starting grid positions were set aside for the top 25 cars in 1996 season IRL points standings, and the remaining eight spots in the grid were open for the remaining entries. The arrangement proved to be very controversial, and was a key issue for CART teams to boycott the race.

The format (similar in practice to NASCAR's Top 35 rule introduced years later) allowed the top 25 entries (not drivers) in owner points to have a guaranteed "locked-in" starting position, from which they could not be bumped, unless failing to complete a four-lap qualifying run over a minimum prescribed speed, which was set as 220 mph by race officials. The grid would still be arranged by speed rank, and the pole position would still be the fastest car on the first day of qualifying (or first trip through the qualifying order), regardless of "locked-in" status. The remaining eight positions would be filled by non-top 25 "at-large" entries, and bumping could only occur amongst those participants.

=== Rules for 1996 ===
- On August 11, 1994, USAC announced a preliminary engine rules package for 1996. In an effort to have a single platform compared to the multiple builds used in the 1980s and early 1990s, all engines were to be turbocharged 2.2L, overhead cam V-8, with 45 inHG, reducing engine displacement from the 2.65L used at the time. The stock-block V-6 engines (e.g. Buick V-6 & Menard V-6), and the 209 cubic inch purpose-built pushrod engines (e.g., the Mercedes-Benz 500I & Greenfield) were to be outlawed. However, this rules package was only preliminary, and was later scrapped.
- Later, a revised rules package for the 1996 IRL season was announced. USAC implemented a rules freeze, with a package largely identical to the one used for the 1995 race, and only a few minor technical revisions. The move made it such that the race could be contested with 1992-1995 model year, CART-based chassis (namely Lola and Reynard). The 1996 model-year chassis being used in CART were not approved, further splintering the rift between the two camps. Apropos to the situation, many IRL teams actually purchased used 1994 and 1995 model-year chassis from rival CART teams. This rules package was going to be used only for 1996, as a brand new normally-aspirated, production-based engine package was planned for 1997.
- As had been allowed for several years, the V-6 "stock block" production-based engines (Buick and Menard) would be allowed 55 inHG of turbocharger boost, and the quad cam 2.65L V-8 engines (Ford Cosworth-XB and Ilmor-D) would stay at 45 inches. While they were not even used in 1995, the 209 cubic inch, purpose-built pushrod engines (e.g., the Mercedes-Benz 500I and Greenfield) were formally banned for 1996. Though eligible to compete, no entries utilized the Honda HRH-V8 engine (first introduced in 1995), and new engines such as the Toyota RV8A and the Ford Cosworth XD were not permitted due to the rules freeze, as Ford Cosworth engines were limited to XB configurations.
- The one-year-old Indy car "tire war" was embraced by the IRL. Both Goodyear and Firestone provided tires.
- The minimum age rule for drivers in 1996 was changed from 21 to 18, a ruling that allowed Michel Jourdain Jr. (19 years, 267 days) to compete in the race. Jourdain became the second-youngest starter in Indy history at the time.

== Entry list ==
The first entry list was published on April 15. All 27 entries that had run the first two rounds of the 1996 year were entered, including the #41 A. J. Foyt Enterprises entry, vacated after Mike Groff's exit, and the #45 Zunne Group Racing entry, driven by Beck Motorsports driver Robbie Buhl at Phoenix, while Eliseo Salazar came back to his regular #7 drive at Team Scandia. Out of those 27 cars, only the #22 (Team Scandia) and the #96 (ABF Motorsports) were at-large entries. In the following weeks, Marco Greco reached a deal with Foyt to drive the #41 car, and Scandia entered Racin Gardner in the #90 car replacing Lyn St. James, who had faced budgetary issues.

Apart from Groff and Davy Jones' entries, eight further at-large driver/car combinations were registered: Fermín Vélez and a later signing, Indy 500 sophomore Alessandro Zampedri, would drive additional entries for Team Scandia. Team Menard and Hemelgarn Racing fielded third cars for Mark Dismore, returning to the race for the first time since failing to qualify in 1992, and Brad Murphey, while Beck Motorsports prepared a second car for Hideshi Matsuda. Randy Tolsma was also signed by McCormack Motorsports, eventually falling under the Zunne Group Racing branding, Dan Drinan was entered with Loop Hole Racing and Scott Harrington entered his own car. EuroInternational, under their legal Osella USA name, and Burns Motorsports also filled entries for Russ Wicks and Jeff Wood, but neither team appeared during the month.

Three of the "locked-in" entries made no attempt to qualify. The #17 entry was eventually withdrawn, as Leigh Miller Racing had sold its assets to Beck Motorsports after Stan Wattles had been ruled out of the race on medical grounds. As for Tempero–Giuffre Racing, the #15, initially assigned to David Kudrave until being replaced by Justin Bell at the start of practice, and the #25 entry, assigned for Joe Gosek a few days earlier, were both vacated between practice days. After the #2 car was forfeited due to Scott Brayton's death, only 21 of the 25 eligible "locked-in" entries were ready to qualify, leaving twelve at-large starting positions up for grabs. On the other hand, 27 drivers took the start at the U.S. 500 at Michigan.

No.	Driver	Team	Chassis	Engine	Tires	Pts.
3	(United States) Eddie Cheever	Team Menard	Lola T95/00	Menard Indy V-6	F	25
4	(United States) Richie Hearn R	Della Penna Motorsports	Reynard 95I	Ford Cosworth XB	G	94
5	(Netherlands) Arie Luyendyk W	Byrd/Treadway Racing	Reynard 95I	Ford Cosworth XB	F	112
7	(Chile) Eliseo Salazar	Team Scandia	Lola T95/00	Ford Cosworth XB	G	16
8	(Italy) Alessandro Zampedri	Team Scandia	Lola T95/00	Ford Cosworth XB	G	—
9	(France) Stéphan Grégoire	Hemelgarn Racing	Reynard 95I	Ford Cosworth XB	F	94
10	(United States) Brad Murphey R	Hemelgarn Racing	Reynard 94I	Ford Cosworth XB	F	—
11	(United States) Scott Sharp	A. J. Foyt Enterprises	Lola T95/00	Ford Cosworth XB	G	124
12	(United States) Buzz Calkins R	Bradley Motorsports	Reynard 95I	Ford Cosworth XB	F	128
14	(United States) Davey Hamilton R	A. J. Foyt Enterprises	Lola T95/00	Ford Cosworth XB	G	82
15	(vacated by Justin Bell R )^{1}	Tempero-Giuffre Racing	Lola T92/00	Buick V-6	G	25
16	(United States) Johnny Parsons	Blueprint Racing	Lola T93/00	Menard Indy V-6	F	80
17	(absent)^{2}	Leigh Miller Racing	Lola T94/00	Ford Cosworth XB	F	22
18	(United States) John Paul Jr.	PDM Racing	Lola T93/00	Menard Indy V-6	G	94
20	(United States) Tony Stewart R	Team Menard	Lola T95/00	Menard Indy V-6	F	114
21	(Colombia) Roberto Guerrero	Pagan Racing	Reynard 95I	Ford Cosworth XB	G	98
22	(Mexico) Michel Jourdain Jr. R	Team Scandia	Lola T95/00	Ford Cosworth XB	G	15
24	(United States) Randy Tolsma R	Zunne Group Racing	Lola T93/00	Buick V-6	F	—
25	(vacated by Joe Gosek R )^{3}	Tempero-Giuffre Racing	Lola T92/00	Buick V-6	G	15
27	(United States) Jim Guthrie R	Blueprint Racing	Lola T93/00	Menard Indy V-6	F	20
30	(United States) Mark Dismore R	Team Menard	Lola T95/00	Menard Indy V-6	F	—
32	(United States) Scott Brayton^{4} (United States) Danny Ongais	Team Menard	Lola T95/00	Menard Indy V-6	F	74
33	(Italy) Michele Alboreto R	Team Scandia	Reynard 95I	Ford Cosworth XB	G	116
34	(Spain) Fermín Vélez R	Team Scandia	Lola T95/00	Ford Cosworth XB	G	—
36	(United States) Dan Drinan R	Loop Hole Racing	Lola T91/00	Buick V-6	G	—
39	(vacated by Scott Harrington R )^{5}	Harrington Motorsports-LP Racing	Lola T92/00	Buick V-6	G	—
41	(Brazil) Marco Greco	A. J. Foyt Enterprises	Lola T94/00	Ford Cosworth XB	G	112
43	(United States) Joe Gosek^{6} R	Team Scandia	Lola T94/00	Ford Cosworth XB	G	—
44	(United States) Scott Harrington^{5} R	Della Penna Motorsports	Reynard 95I	Ford Cosworth XB	G	—
45	(United States) Lyn St. James	Zunne Group Racing	Lola T94/00	Ford Cosworth XB	G	22
46	(New Zealand) Rob Wilson^{7} R	Project Indy	Lola T93/00	Ford Cosworth XB	G	—
50	(absent)^{8}	Osella USA	Reynard 95I	Ford Cosworth XB	—	—
52	(Japan) Hideshi Matsuda	Beck Motorsports	Lola T94/00	Ford Cosworth XB	F	—
54	(United States) Robbie Buhl R	Beck Motorsports	Lola T94/00	Ford Cosworth XB	F	32
60	(United States) Mike Groff	Walker Racing	Reynard 95I	Ford Cosworth XB	G	—
64	(United States) Johnny Unser R	Project Indy	Reynard 95I	Ford Cosworth XB	G	26
66	(absent)^{9}	Burns Motorsports	Lola T92/00	Buick V-6	—	—
70	(United States) Davy Jones	Galles Racing	Lola T95/00	Mercedes-Benz/Ilmor D	G	—
75	(United States) Johnny O'Connell R	Cunningham Racing	Reynard 95I	Ford Cosworth XB	F	116
77	(United States) Danny Ongais^{10} (United States) Tyce Carlson R	Brickell Racing	Lola T93/00	Menard Indy V-6	G	—
90	(United States) Racin Gardner R	Team Scandia	Lola T94/00	Ford Cosworth XB	G	82
91	(United States) Buddy Lazier	Hemelgarn Racing	Reynard 95I	Ford Cosworth XB	F	18
96	(United States) Paul Durant R	ABF Motorsports	Lola T92/00	Buick V-6	G	13
99	(United States) Billy Boat^{11} R	Pagan Racing	Reynard 94I	Ford Cosworth XB	G	—

Entries that were not locked-in for the race.
Locked-in entry repurposed as an at-large entry.

- W Former winner
- R Indy 500 Rookie
1. David Kudrave, entered for the event, was replaced before the start of practice. Justin Bell passed up on the ride after not completing his rookie test, and Joe Gosek practiced in it in the second week before switching to Team Scandia.
2. Stan Wattles, its lead driver, had been injured at Phoenix. Beck Motorsports, without cars after splitting from Zunne Group, struck a deal to buy their cars and entry, to use them as their own.
3. Joe Gosek practiced in it the first week, and switched to the #15 car after not getting to complete his rookie test.
4. Brayton was originally entered with the #2 locked-in entry and qualified the car on Pole Day, but withdrew later to re-qualify in the #32 "at-large" entry, forfeiting his "locked-in" status. Brayton died on May 17 after sustaining a basilar skull fracture in a crash, and Ongais was named as his replacement, switching from Brickell Racing. Per USAC rules, Brayton's pole position was withdrawn, and Ongais was allowed to start the race at the back of the field.
5. Harrington was entered in the #39 car until his lone chassis was destroyed in a crash on May 16, and he signed to Della Penna Motorsports on Bump Day.
6. Gosek switched from Tempero-Giuffre Racing on May 18.
7. Entered on May 16.
8. Russ Wicks was entered, but neither the car or the driver took part in practice over an alleged lack of sponsorship
9. Jeff Wood was entered, but neither the car or the driver took part in practice.
10. Butch Brickell, entered for the event, was not medically cleared to race after a crash in testing at Walt Disney World. Carlson was entered on Bump Day after Danny Ongais, who was entered on May 16, switched to Team Menard
11. Entered on May 14. Practiced and crashed in the #84 A. J. Foyt Enterprises car before being bumped.

== Race schedule ==
Race schedule — May 1996
Sun	Mon	Tue	Wed	Thu	Fri	Sat
			1	2	3	4 ROP
5 ROP	6 ROP	7 Practice	8 Practice	9 Practice	10; Practice	11; Pole Day
12; Time Trials	13; Practice	14; Practice	15; Practice	16; Practice	17; Practice	18; Time Trials
19; Bump Day	20	21	22	23; Carb Day	24	25; Parade
26; Indy 500	27; Memorial Day	28	29	30	31	

Color	Notes
Green	Practice
Dark Blue	Time trials
Silver	Race day
Red	Rained out*
Blank	No track activity

* Includes days where track
activity was significantly
limited due to rain

ROP — denotes Rookie
Orientation Program

== Practice (week 1) ==
=== Saturday May 4 - Opening Day ===
Rookie orientation was scheduled for Opening Day. However, rain washed out the entire first day of practice.

=== Sunday May 5 - Rookie Orientation ===
Opening day was reserved for rookie orientation, largely due to the overwhelming number of Indy 500 rookies entered. A cool morning saw only half an hour of practice amongst nine cars, until rain closed the track for the day at 9:35 a.m. Rookie Tony Stewart led the abbreviated session with an unrepresentative lap of 193.957 mph.

Top practice speeds
Pos	No.	Driver	Team	Chassis	Engine	Speed
1	20	(United States) Tony Stewart R	Team Menard	Lola	Menard	193.957
2	23	(United States) Mark Dismore R	Team Menard	Lola	Menard	193.569
3	33	(Italy) Michele Alboreto R	Team Scandia	Lola	Ford Cosworth	188.648

=== Monday May 6 - Rookie Orientation ===
Rain hampered practice for the third day in a row, however, activity was heavy throughout the day, with many drivers looking to finish their rookie tests. At 9:19 a.m., Tony Stewart ran the fastest lap ever at the Speedway by a rookie, at 231.774 mph. Later in the day, he completed the fastest lap of the month at 237.336 mph, which broke the existing unofficial track record.

Eleven drivers completed all four phases of their rookie tests: Stewart, Mark Dismore, Buzz Calkins, Michel Jourdain Jr., Michele Alboreto, Richie Hearn, Racin Gardner, Randy Tolsma, Dan Drinan, Brad Murphey, and Jim Guthrie. Despite being considered a rookie, Davey Hamilton, who had failed to qualify for the Indy 500 in 1995, was given an exemption, and did not have to complete a rookie test. Hamilton had also entered the race in 1991 and 1993, but he never made it past the scheduled Rookie Orientation days in April, which were considered test days and not official practice sessions.

Off the track, Indianapolis Motor Speedway officials filed a lawsuit in the United States District Court for the Southern District of Indiana against CART in regards to the use of the "IndyCar" trademark. IMS officials deemed that CART, who was organizing the rival U.S. 500, was failing to comply with the license agreement under which they received permission to use the "IndyCar" trademark. This lawsuit would be settled out of court months later, as CART gave up on the trademark in exchange for the Indy Racing League agreeing to not make use of it until the 2003 season.

Top practice speeds
Pos	No.	Driver	Team	Chassis	Engine	Speed
1	20	(United States) Tony Stewart R	Team Menard	Lola	Menard	237.336
2	30	(United States) Mark Dismore R	Team Menard	Lola	Menard	228.566
3	22	(Mexico) Michel Jourdain Jr. R	Team Scandia	Lola	Ford Cosworth	228.154

=== Tuesday May 7 ===
Rain fell once again at the Speedway, and the start of the practice was delayed until 2:30 p.m. Veteran drivers took to the track for the first time, with Menard teammates Scott Brayton and Eddie Cheever quickly setting the pace at over 235 mph and 233 mph, respectively.

Johnny Unser and Paul Durant both competed their rookie tests, bringing the total to 13 rookies. That morning, Zunne Group Racing announced that Lyn St. James, who had run the first two IRL races with Team Scandia, would drive its #45 entry, as a teammate to Randy Tolsma.

Late in the day, Arie Luyendyk moved up to the top five, with a lap of 232.162 mph. Team Menard, however, swept the top three positions on the speed chart, when Tony Stewart topped at 236.121 mph.

Top practice speeds
Pos	No.	Driver	Team	Chassis	Engine	Speed
1	20	(United States) Tony Stewart R	Team Menard	Lola	Menard	236.121
2	3	(United States) Eddie Cheever	Team Menard	Lola	Menard	235.997
3	2	(United States) Scott Brayton	Team Menard	Lola	Menard	235.730

=== Wednesday May 8 ===
Rain washed out practice for the day, the second day of the month completely lost to weather.

=== Thursday May 9 ===
A windy but warm day saw heavy action. Arie Luyendyk ran the fastest practice lap in Speedway history up to that point in his back-up car, at 237.774 mph, four miles faster than his primary had managed, which was a surprise for Luyendyk himself. The three main Menard entries (Stewart, Cheever, and Brayton) were all over 234 mph. Several other drivers cracked the 230 mph barrier, including Buddy Lazier, Davy Jones, and Scott Sharp., while Stéphan Grégoire and Johnny Parsons made their first on-track appearances.

Top practice speeds
Pos	No.	Driver	Team	Chassis	Engine	Speed
1	35	(Netherlands) Arie Luyendyk	Byrd/Treadway Racing	Reynard	Ford Cosworth	237.774
2	20	(United States) Tony Stewart R	Team Menard	Lola	Menard	237.029
3	2	(United States) Scott Brayton	Team Menard	Lola	Menard	235.750

=== Friday May 10 ===
"Fast Friday", the final day of practice before time trials, saw the fastest laps turned in Indy history. At 1:04 p.m., 35 minutes after completing the fastest lap of the month (238.045 mph), Arie Luyendyk ran the fastest single lap in Speedway history in the back-up #35 car, with an average speed of 239.260 mph. At 37.616 seconds, Luyendyk's lap was 0.116 seconds shy of the elusive 240 mph barrier, and as of 2022, stands as the Indianapolis Motor Speedway one-lap unofficial track record. Shortly after the track opened, Scott Brayton had run his fastest lap of the month, at 235.688 mph. He was fourth fastest behind Tony Stewart, who went over the 236 mph mark, and Scott Sharp. At 3:25 p.m., rain closed the track for the day.

During the day, Robbie Buhl became the 14th driver to complete his rookie test. His car had been acquired to Arizona Motorsports, and was the one Al Unser practiced on in 1994 before announcing his retirement from the sport. This machine had failed to make the grid two years in a row, as Jeff Ward was off the cut on it in 1995. With Buhl, 33 confirmed car-driver combinations had practiced before the start of Pole Day qualifying, although Joe Gosek and Justin Bell were still due to complete their rookie tests. Three drivers among the confirmed entries (Hideshi Matsuda, Johnny O'Connell and Scott Harrington) were still securing the necessary funding, and did not run at all before time trials.

Top practice speeds
Pos	No.	Driver	Team	Chassis	Engine	Speed
1	35	(Netherlands) Arie Luyendyk	Byrd/Treadway Racing	Reynard	Ford Cosworth	239.260
2	20	(United States) Tony Stewart R	Team Menard	Lola	Menard	236.004
3	11	(United States) Scott Sharp	A. J. Foyt Enterprises	Lola	Ford Cosworth	235.701

== Time trials (weekend 1) ==
=== Pole Day - Saturday May 11 ===
Pole day dawned cold and rainy. The track opened with a 30-minute practice at 11:55 a.m., with 24 cars taking to the track. Johnny Parsons suffered the first crash of the month shortly after in Turn 3, while Arie Luyendyk, who barely avoided Parsons's crash after clipping an errant tyre, stalled with engine trouble 25 minutes later. His back-up car had now become the primary #5 entry after an approved swap of numbers. Marco Greco and Scott Sharp also lost their engines during this session. Tony Stewart ran the fastest practice lap of the morning, at 235.719 mph.

Pole day time trials began at 2 p.m. Lyn St. James was the first car to qualify, completing her four-lap run at 224.594 mph. Buddy Lazier then grabbed the provisional pole at 231.468 mph. Twenty minutes later, Davy Jones broke the 1 and 4 lap track records, completing a run at 232.882 mph. The speed broke Roberto Guerrero's 1992 track record.

Tony Stewart bumped Jones off the pole with another new track record, at 233.100 mph, becoming the first rookie to hold both the 1 and 4 lap track records since Teo Fabi in 1983. His Menard teammates Eddie Cheever (231.781 mph) and Scott Brayton (231.535 mph) also put in respectable runs, but neither were fast enough for the pole. Eliseo Salazar just missed making the front row at 232.684 mph.

By 5:00 p.m., the field was filled to twenty cars, fifteen of which were "locked-in" entries. Due to expected difficulties replacing the blown engine in his primary car, Arie Luyendyk had to revert to his original primary car, which was now the back-up, and a brand-new engine that had heating issues after a few practice laps. With 33 minutes left in the day, Luyendyk finally started his qualifying attempt. Despite averaging 232.407 mph over his first two laps, which he later blamed on the use of an incorrect gear, he got to set new all-time track records, with a best lap of 234.742 mph, and a four-lap average of 233.390 mph. With no other contenders in line, it appeared Luyendyk had secured his second Indy 500 pole. Tony Stewart and Davy Jones tentatively rounded out the front row.

Suddenly, Team Menard began scrambling, and Scott Brayton was back on pit road carrying his helmet. The team had withdrawn their already-qualified #2 car, and Brayton was preparing to re-qualify in a back-up car, on which Brayton had only turned 13 laps that morning, although at competitive speeds. That chassis was the same one Luyendyk had used to qualify in second place at Indianapolis the previous year, and Tony Stewart had undertaken his rookie test on it. With this gamble, Menard forfeited one of their "locked-in" spots, but Brayton was eligible to run for the pole again. He took to the track at 5:42 p.m., and averaged 233.718 mph over a consistent 4-lap run that was fast enough to take the pole position, setting another four-lap track record. Luyendyk's one-lap record, however, still stood. At the 6 o'clock gun, Scott Brayton officially accepted his second straight Indy 500 pole position award. Luyendyk and Stewart now rounded out the front row.

At 7:45 p.m., USAC chief steward Keith Ward announced that Arie Luyendyk's car had failed post-qualifying inspection. The car was 7 pounds below the minimum weight of 1,550 pounds, and his qualifying attempt was disallowed. Running against time in the rush of qualifying, Byrd/Treadway Racing's crew never weighted the back-up machine after the change of engines, and both series officials and team representatives acknowledged the infraction had not been intentional, but rather an "oversight" by the team. The ruling elevated Tony Stewart to second place, and nullified Luyendyk's standing one-lap track record. Scott Brayton's fast lap of 233.851 mph now stood as the official one-lap record, alongside his 4-lap record. Despite being disqualified late on Saturday, Luyendyk would be permitted to re-qualify the same machine on a later day. However, one of the three allotted attempts were charged to the chassis, a similar situation to the one Michael Andretti faced in the last underweight disqualification in 1989.

Pole Day
Pos.	No.	Driver	Team	Chassis	Engine	Speed
1	32	(United States) Scott Brayton	Team Menard	Lola	Menard	233.718
DSQ	35	(Netherlands) Arie Luyendyk	Byrd/Treadway Racing	Reynard	Ford Cosworth	233.390
2	20	(United States) Tony Stewart R	Team Menard	Lola	Menard	233.100
3	70	(United States) Davy Jones	Galles Racing	Lola	Mercedes-Ilmor	232.882
4	7	(Chile) Eliseo Salazar	Team Scandia	Lola	Ford Cosworth	232.684
5	3	(United States) Eddie Cheever	Team Menard	Lola	Menard	231.781
6	91	(United States) Buddy Lazier	Hemelgarn Racing	Reynard	Ford Cosworth	231.468
7	21	(Colombia) Roberto Guerrero	Pagan Racing	Reynard	Ford Cosworth	231.373
8	8	(Italy) Alessandro Zampedri	Team Scandia	Lola	Ford Cosworth	229.565
9	22	(Mexico) Michel Jourdain Jr. R	Team Scandia	Lola	Ford Cosworth	229.380
10	12	(United States) Buzz Calkins R	Bradley Motorsports	Reynard	Ford Cosworth	229.013
11	14	(United States) Davey Hamilton R	A. J. Foyt Enterprises	Lola	Ford Cosworth	228.887
12	60	(United States) Mike Groff	Walker Racing	Reynard	Ford Cosworth	228.704
13	33	(Italy) Michele Alboreto R	Team Scandia	Lola	Ford Cosworth	228.229
14	9	(France) Stéphan Grégoire	Hemelgarn Racing	Reynard	Ford Cosworth	227.556
15	30	(United States) Mark Dismore R	Team Menard	Lola	Menard	227.260
16	4	(United States) Richie Hearn R	Della Penna Motorsports	Reynard	Ford Cosworth	226.521
17	64	(United States) Johnny Unser R	Project Indy	Reynard	Ford Cosworth	226.115
18	18	(United States) John Paul Jr.	PDM Racing	Lola	Menard	224.757
19	45	(United States) Lyn St. James	Zunne Group Racing	Lola	Ford Cosworth	224.594
20	27	(United States) Jim Guthrie R	Blueprint Racing	Lola	Menard	222.394
	11	(United States) Scott Sharp	A. J. Foyt Enterprises	Lola	Ford Cosworth	Waved off

=== Second Day - Sunday May 12 ===
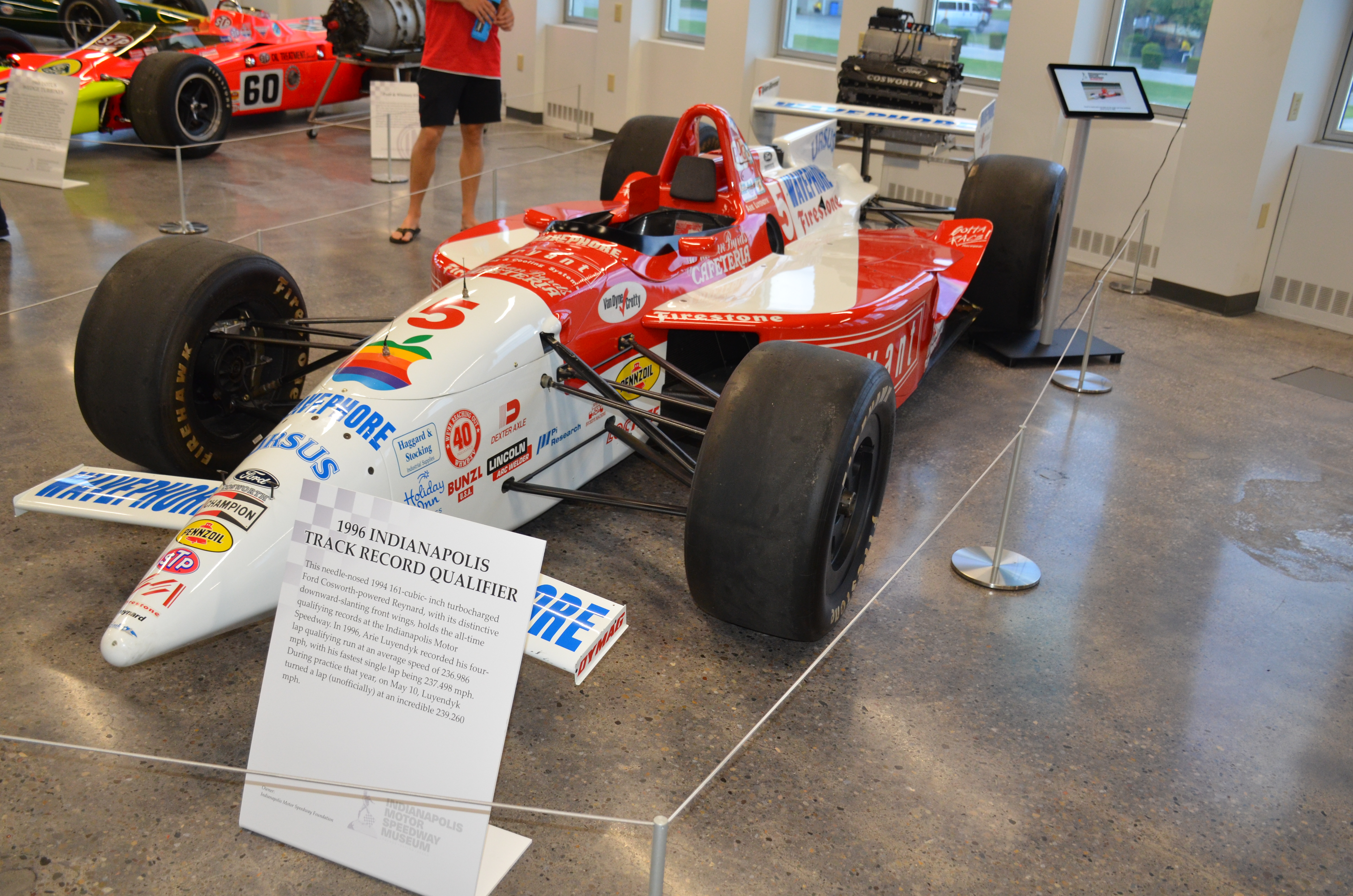
Arie Luyendyk track record setting car.

After being disqualified the night before, Arie Luyendyk returned to the track on the second day of time trials, now at the wheel of the primary car he could not qualify the day before. Sunday saw better weather conditions, and Luyendyk set track records on all four laps.

- Lap 1: 38.097 seconds, 236.239 mph (new 1-lap track record)
- Lap 2: 37.983 seconds, 236.948 mph (new 1-lap track record)
- Lap 3: 37.933 seconds, 237.260 mph (new 1-lap track record)
- Lap 4: 37.895 seconds, 237.498 mph (all-time 1-lap track record)
- Total: 2:31.908, 236.986 mph (all-time 4-lap track record)

Luyendyk's run made him the fastest qualifier in the field, however, as a second-day qualifier, he was forced to line up 21st (behind all of the first-day qualifiers). Luyendyk's one and four lap track records still stand as of 2024. By the end of the day, the field was filled to 26 cars, of which 18 were eligible for "locked-in" positions. During practice, Johnny O'Connell and Scott Harrington finally started their driver's test, the former having formalized his sponsorship on Pole Day morning, and the latter on a shoestring budget.

Second Day
Pos.	No.	Driver	Team	Chassis	Engine	Speed
21	5	(Netherlands) Arie Luyendyk	Byrd/Treadway Racing	Reynard	Ford Cosworth	236.986
22	11	(United States) Scott Sharp	A. J. Foyt Enterprises	Lola	Ford Cosworth	231.201
23	41	(Brazil) Marco Greco	A. J. Foyt Enterprises	Lola	Ford Cosworth	228.840
24	54	(United States) Robbie Buhl R	Beck Motorsports	Lola	Ford Cosworth	226.217
25	96	(United States) Paul Durant R	ABF Motorsports	Lola	Buick	225.404
26	90	(United States) Racin Gardner R	Team Scandia	Lola	Ford Cosworth	224.453
	10	(United States) Brad Murphey R	Hemelgarn Racing	Reynard	Ford Cosworth	Engine trouble

== Practice (week 2) ==
=== Monday May 13 ===
A light day of activity saw Tony Stewart lead the speed chart at 235.837 mph. Johnny O'Connell (216.024 mph) led the non-qualified cars and passed his rookie test, with Tyce Carlson bringing the total to 16 later that day in the Loop Hole Racing entry assigned to Dan Drinan.

Top practice speeds
Pos	No.	Driver	Team	Chassis	Engine	Speed
1	23	(United States) Tony Stewart R	Team Menard	Lola	Menard	235.837
2	7	(Chile) Eliseo Salazar	Team Scandia	Lola	Ford Cosworth	234.858
3	21	(Colombia) Roberto Guerrero	Pagan Racing	Reynard	Ford Cosworth	234.308

=== Tuesday May 14 ===
Brad Murphey led the non-qualified cars with a fast lap of 228.612 mph. Arie Luyendyk led all cars with a lap of 238.493 mph, faster than his official track record, and the second-fastest practice lap in Indy history.

Fermín Vélez completed his rookie test, while Billy Boat, freshly signed to drive Pagan's second car, and Andy Michner took their first practice laps of the month. Just like Tyce Carlson, Michner had not yet been assigned to a ride, and was taking his rookie test with Loop Hole Racing.

Top practice speeds
Pos	No.	Driver	Team	Chassis	Engine	Speed
1	35	(Netherlands) Arie Luyendyk	Byrd/Treadway Racing	Reynard	Ford Cosworth	238.493
2	23	(United States) Tony Stewart R	Team Menard	Lola	Menard	234.821
3	44	(United States) Richie Hearn R	Della Penna Motorsports	Reynard	Ford Cosworth	232.378

=== Wednesday May 15 ===
Rain washed out practice for the day. It marked the third entire day lost to rain, and the eighth overall hampered by the weather.

=== Thursday May 16 ===
A fairly busy day saw 22 cars take nearly 900 laps. Arie Luyendyk once again led the speed chart, at 234.540 mph. Brad Murphey (225.875 mph) was the fastest of the non-qualified cars, with Johnny O'Connell also over 225 mph.

Rob Wilson, in a second Lola for Project Indy, took his first laps of the month. Scott Harrington and Billy Boat passed their rookie tests, but Harrington later crashed in turn 3. His team, which had few resources and was being assisted by Treadway Racing, would be unable to repair his car or buy another one in time for the second weekend of qualifying.

Justin Bell confirmed he would not attempt to qualify for the race, as Tempero-Giuffre Racing struggled for speed all month. Bell had not passed a single phase of his rookie test and had not turned a lap since May 9, when he clocked the fastest of his 55 laps at just 186 mph. Joe Gosek, who fell short of the 200 mph barrier at the wheel of the #25, had switched rides since May 10, his best effort so far in the #15 being a 203 mph lap on May 14.

Top practice speeds
Pos	No.	Driver	Team	Chassis	Engine	Speed
1	35	(Netherlands) Arie Luyendyk	Byrd/Treadway Racing	Reynard	Ford Cosworth	234.540
2	33	(Italy) Michele Alboreto R	Team Scandia	Reynard	Ford Cosworth	231.083
3	44	(United States) Richie Hearn R	Della Penna Motorsports	Reynard	Ford Cosworth	230.669

=== Friday May 17 - Death of Scott Brayton ===
Six days after his Pole Day performance, Scott Brayton went back to the track to prepare for the race, running laps with the #23 back-up machine. It was a 1995 Lola chassis with a Menard engine, on which all three of his teammates had practiced previously for a total of 238 laps. At 12:17 p.m., on his 53rd lap of the day, Brayton's right-rear tyre deflated as he entered Turn 2. His car entered into a half-spin in the middle of turn, and crashed hard into the outside wall at the exit, sliding 600 feet to a stop down the backstretch. Brayton was found unconscious in the car, and was transported immediately to Methodist Hospital. He was pronounced dead at 12:50 p.m. EST. Brayton was killed instantly of basilar skull fracture.

The fatal incident cast a pall over the Speedway, and the entire racing community. It was determined that Brayton likely ran over a piece of debris in turn four or the mainstretch, which caused the puncture on his right rear tire. Unaware of the debris, he completed the lap at 228.606 mph, then drove into turn one. The tire suffered rapid deflation in the south chute and in turn two, causing the car to lose control. It was the first of two fatal crashes in major open wheel racing in 1996. On July 14 during the Molson Indy Toronto CART rookie Jeff Krosnoff was also killed in a crash.

The official report of fatality was not announced until 4 p.m, so family members could be notified. In the meantime, unaware of Brayton's condition, some other drivers resumed practice for a time. Arie Luyendyk posted the fastest lap overall at 234.870 mph, and Brad Murphey (228.548 mph) was the fastest of the non-qualified cars. When the news was released, nearly all participants stopped for the day.

Earlier that day, veteran Danny Ongais, who had been confirmed on Thursday, took his first laps in the Brickell Racing machine, while Andy Michner, Joe Gosek and Rob Wilson became the last drivers to complete their rookie tests, bringing the total to 22. Despite this, Michner stated he had dismissed an offer to drive Foyt's back-up car, the #84, and that he would not attempt to qualify for the race, as he felt he wasn't going to get "enough time to practice after qualifying to prepare for the race".

After completing his rookie test in the #15, Joe Gosek stepped out of his deal with Tempero-Giuffre Racing. With help from the IRL, he landed a ride as the seventh driver for Team Scandia in the #43 car, which had been driven by Fermín Vélez during the week. Vélez, who was still due to qualify, would switch to the #34, which had been the back-up car for Eliseo Salazar. Tempero-Giuffre didn't sign a replacement for Gosek, and their two locked-in entries were not qualified. With Hideshi Matsuda being left out of the qualification draw for the time being, nine at-large car-driver combinations were set to fight for five open spots, with Johnny O'Connell and Johnny Parsons still due to take their locked-in spots with a valid qualifying attempt, and the unknown status of Team Menard's now vacant spot on the grid.

Top practice speeds
Pos	No.	Driver	Team	Chassis	Engine	Speed
1	35	(Netherlands) Arie Luyendyk	Byrd/Treadway Racing	Reynard	Ford Cosworth	234.870
2	23	(United States) Scott Brayton	Team Menard	Lola	Menard	230.126
3	4	(United States) Richie Hearn R	Della Penna Motorsports	Reynard	Ford Cosworth	229.031

== Time trials (weekend 2) ==
=== Third Day - Saturday May 18 ===
Track activity resumed after Friday's tragedy. At 9:35 a.m., Dan Drinan, who was unsuccessfully trying to improve his best lap of the month (215 mph) during the practice session, endured a heavy accident in turn 1, in a very similar fashion to Brayton's crash. He was transported to Methodist Hospital, reportedly alert and in stable condition, and underwent surgery that same day. Drinan suffered a concussion, fractures in his left hip and foot, and a bruised left lung, and was ruled out for qualifying.

Five drivers completed a qualification attempt, including Johnny Parsons, who had his first on-track appearance since his Pole Day crash during practice, and went on to secure his place on the grid with minimal running. Totalling just 52 laps for the whole month at the end of the day, Parsons ranked last on distance completed among all drivers that had taken part in practice. Brad Murphey was the fastest at 226.053, and the field was filled to 31 cars when Johnny O'Connell completed his attempt after the 6 p.m. gun had been fired. Danny Ongais, whose last race at the Speedway had been in 1986, completed a 20 laps refresher course, and was set to qualify on Bump Day, having logged the fastest lap among the non-qualified cars with a 220.194 mph lap. Tony Stewart shook down Brayton's car during the day, as Team Menard was reportedly looking for a driver to keep it in the field as a tribute to their fallen driver. Al Unser, Geoff Brabham and John Andretti were some of the names being floated as potential candidates.

Third Day
Pos.	No.	Driver	Team	Chassis	Engine	Speed
27	10	(United States) Brad Murphey R	Hemelgarn Racing	Reynard	Ford Cosworth	226.053
28	16	(United States) Johnny Parsons	Blueprint Racing	Lola	Menard	223.843
29	34	(Spain) Fermín Vélez R	Team Scandia	Lola	Ford Cosworth	222.487
30	75	(United States) Johnny O'Connell R	Cunningham Racing	Reynard	Ford Cosworth	222.361
	99	(United States) Billy Boat R	Pagan Racing	Reynard	Ford Cosworth	221.824

=== Bump Day - Sunday May 19 ===
At 11:00 a.m., Team Menard announced that Danny Ongais would drive the #2 entry, qualified as the #32, that was vacated after the death of Scott Brayton. Due to the replacement, the car was moved to the back of the field, elevating Tony Stewart to the pole position. Ongais was recommended by Al Unser, who had been approached first by John Menard for the drive. During the day, Ongais would complete 25 laps at the wheel of the #62 back-up car, with a best lap of 221.904 mph. To replace Ongais, Brickell Racing signed Tyce Carlson, who later revealed he had to "break" into a friend's car to retrieve his racing suit. Carlson had attempted to reach a deal to drive for Tempero–Giuffre Racing during the week, but it had fallen through.

At 1:50 p.m., Randy Tolsma, who had completed his best lap of the month at 214.843 mph, crashed in Turn 1, causing considerable damage to the #24 car, although its driver was uninjured. Zunne Group Racing had not entered a spare, and Tolsma stated he was not considering offers to drive other cars for a qualification attempt. Having secured the funding on Saturday afternoon, veteran Hideshi Matsuda arrived at the track for the first time all month, and was quickly practising over 227 mph. At 4 p.m., driving an "at-large" entry for Beck Motorsports, Matsuda put his car safely in the field at 226.856 mph.

During the day, Scott Harrington rejoined the queue, having struck a deal to drive in Della Penna's back-up, a car that Teo Fabi had driven to an 8th-place finish in 1995. Billy Boat started practicing in the #84 Foyt entry, as his qualified #99 Pagan car was the slowest in the field and had no "locked-in" berth. At 5:24 p.m., he crashed in turn 1 and complained of back and leg pain. Boat was not medically cleared to drive, and he would not be able to re-qualify if his car was bumped.

With 23 minutes to go, Harrington filled the field with a run of 222.185 mph, and immediately after, Joe Gosek bumped Boat with a run of 222.793 mph, dropping Harrington to the bubble spot. Tyce Carlson made two attempts in the closing minutes, but he was not fast enough to bump his way into the field. With a best practice lap of 218.755 mph, but having failed to get over 215 mph on solo runs, Rob Wilson didn't make a qualification attempt.

Despite the controversy regarding the "locked-in" entries, the "fastest 33 cars" did manage to make the field, and one bump did occur. None of the "locked-in" entries qualified slower than the slowest "at-large" entry, nor did any fail to meet the 220 mph requirement. At the end of qualifying, 17 rookies comprised the grid, a number that only trailed the 19 rookies that started the 1919 and 1930 editions, the latter among a 38-car field. Since then, no more than 12 rookies (1931, 1932, 1951) had qualified for the Indy 500, and the 1981 race had been the last grid with at least 10 rookie drivers. Neither of the 17 rookies had previous racing experience in a superspeedway at more than 200 mph, and 13 of them had never competed in an Indy car race prior to 1996. Also, three rookies were making their Indy car debut: Racin Gardner, Brad Murphey and Joe Gosek.

Bump Day
Pos.	No.	Driver	Team	Chassis	Engine	Speed
30	52	(Japan) Hideshi Matsuda	Beck Motorsports	Lola	Ford Cosworth	226.856
31	43	(United States) Joe Gosek R	Team Scandia	Lola	Ford Cosworth	222.793
32	44	(United States) Scott Harrington R	Della Penna Motorsports	Reynard	Ford Cosworth	222.185
Failed to qualify
	99	(United States) Billy Boat R	Pagan Racing	Reynard	Ford Cosworth	Bumped / 221.824
	77	(United States) Tyce Carlson R	Brickell Racing	Lola	Menard	Too slow / 221.201
	46	(New Zealand) Rob Wilson R	Project Indy	Lola	Ford Cosworth	No attempt
	36	(United States) Dan Drinan R	Loop Hole Racing	Lola	Buick	Crashed in practice
	24	(United States) Randy Tolsma R	Zunne Group Racing	Lola	Ford Cosworth	Crashed in practice

== Carburetion Day ==
=== Thursday May 23 - Final practice ===
Rain delayed the start of final practice until 12:52 p.m., and the running was hampered by multiple incidents. Stéphan Grégoire had an oil leak, Brad Murphey coasted back to the pits with low oil pressure, Paul Durant suffered a blown engine, and the car driven by Buzz Calkins developed a minor fire while in the pits. The most serious incident of the day involved Johnny Unser, who crashed in turn 4. Damage was moderate, and Unser was not injured.

Rain stopped the session at 1:49 p.m. As there had been only 23 minutes of green flag track time in between four yellows, the track reopened at 5:51 p.m. with two more yellows until the gun was fired at 6:15 p.m. During this last scramble, Danny Ongais was able to complete 17 laps in his only run at the wheel of the #32 before the race, running the 7th fastest speed with a best lap of 226.364 mph. Tony Stewart, who had inherited pole position after Brayton's death, was the fastest car of the day at 231.273 mph.

Top practice speeds
Pos	No.	Driver	Team	Chassis	Engine	Speed
1	20	(United States) Tony Stewart R	Team Menard	Lola	Menard	231.273
2	3	(United States) Eddie Cheever	Team Menard	Lola	Menard	230.621
3	91	(United States) Buddy Lazier	Hemelgarn Racing	Reynard	Ford Cosworth	230.598

=== Pit Stop Challenge ===
The 20th annual Coors Pit Stop Challenge was held on Thursday May 23. A new qualification format and new sponsor/name was introduced for the 1996 event. The top five race qualifiers were automatically eligible, provided they accepted their invitation. If a team declined their invitation, the slot would be filled by the next-highest race qualifier from the starting grid, and so on. Preliminary rounds during the week were eliminated. After the death of polesitter Scott Brayton, his #32 entry (with Danny Ongais now assigned as the driver) moved to the back of the starting field and was withdrawn from the Pit Stop Challenge. Teams were required to change four tires and simulate a fuel hook-up.

Tony Stewart (elevated to 1st on the starting grid), Davy Jones (2nd), Eliseo Salazar (3rd), Eddie Cheever (4th), and Roberto Guerrero (6th) ultimately accepted berths for the contest. The Hemelgarn Racing team of Buddy Lazier (5th) declined their invitation. Salazar's Team Scandia initially gave up their spot and was replaced by Foyt Racing (Davey Hamilton). But Scandia later reconsidered and re-entered the contest. Galles Racing with driver Davy Jones, and led by chief mechanic Mitch Davis defeated Pagan Racing with driver Roberto Guerrero and chief mechanic Doug Barnes the finals. It was the fourth victory in the event for Galles.

Quarterfinals
Roberto Guerrero (Pagan Racing)	19.108
Eliseo Salazar (Team Scandia)	DQ

Semifinals
Roberto Guerrero (Pagan Racing)	20.488
Tony Stewart (Team Menard)	DQ
Davy Jones (Galles Racing)	13.925
Eddie Cheever (Team Menard)	18.615

Finals
Davy Jones (Galles Racing)	14.176
Roberto Guerrero (Pagan Racing)	16.368

== Starting grid ==
Row	Inside		Middle		Outside	
1	20	(United States) Tony Stewart R	70	(United States) Davy Jones	7	(Chile) Eliseo Salazar
2	3	(United States) Eddie Cheever	91	(United States) Buddy Lazier	21	(Colombia) Roberto Guerrero
3	8	(Italy) Alessandro Zampedri	22	(Mexico) Michel Jourdain Jr. R	12	(United States) Buzz Calkins R
4	14	(United States) Davey Hamilton R	60	(United States) Mike Groff	33	(Italy) Michele Alboreto R
5	9	(France) Stéphan Grégoire	30	(United States) Mark Dismore R	4	(United States) Richie Hearn R
6	64	(United States) Johnny Unser R	18	(United States) John Paul Jr.	45	(United States) Lyn St. James
7	27	(United States) Jim Guthrie R	5	(Netherlands) Arie Luyendyk W	11	(United States) Scott Sharp
8	41	(Brazil) Marco Greco	54	(United States) Robbie Buhl R	96	(United States) Paul Durant R
9	90	(United States) Racin Gardner R	10	(United States) Brad Murphey R	16	(United States) Johnny Parsons
10	34	(Spain) Fermín Vélez R	75	(United States) Johnny O'Connell R	52	(Japan) Hideshi Matsuda
11	43	(United States) Joe Gosek R	44	(United States) Scott Harrington R	32	(United States) Danny Ongais*

Scott Brayton officially qualified for the pole position, but was killed in a practice crash on May 17. Danny Ongais was named as the substitute driver; in accordance with USAC rules the car was moved to the rear of the starting grid.

=== Alternates ===
- First alternate: Billy Boat (#99) - Bumped
- Second alternate: Tyce Carlson (#77) - Too slow

== Race summary ==
=== Pre race ===
Morning rain threatened to delay the start, but the track was effectively dried. The cue for Mary Fendrich Hulman to give the command to start engines was given prematurely, as USAC had not finished their final inspection. As such, the engines were briefly stopped for a minute. It would be the final time Hulman would give the starting command for the "500." After some hesitation, the field pulled away for the pace laps, although Hideshi Matsuda's car refused to fire because of a faulty starter was pushed to the pits, re-joining the field for the pace lap.

During the first parade lap, Danny Ongais lagged behind the field, and drove one memorial parade lap alone to salute Scott Brayton's memory. On the second parade lap, Johnny Unser coasted into the pits with a transmission failure, and dropped out before the green flag.

=== Start ===
A conservative and ragged start saw Tony Stewart retain the lead into Turn 1, while Eliseo Salazar overcame Davy Jones for second, and Roberto Guerrero jumped Eddie Cheever and Buddy Lazier for fourth. Most of the field started at a slow pace, but Stewart was quickly running at a record pace of 221.965 mph after two laps.

During the start, Mark Dismore did a half-spin in Turn 1, and kicked up mud from the infield, which brought out the yellow on lap 3, while Dismore ducked into the pits repeatedly as his crew made checks to the car. Under the yellow, Scott Harrington approached the tail-end of the field too quickly down the backstretch, locking up the brakes as he reached them. He nearly hit three cars, and spun undamaged into the warm-up lane on Turn 3.

After three green flag laps, Paul Durant blew an engine down the backstretch on Lap 11 and ducked into the warm-up lane, only to spin in his own fluid and into the racing line on Turn 3. In the Lap 18 restart, Danny Ongais lost control, and spun harmlessly through turn four. Thus, the first representative green flag period, and the longest of the race, didn't began until Lap 21. Having started 20th, Arie Luyendyk had already charged into 11th place before the first caution, and was up to 8th before the second, passing Alessandro Zampedri a few laps later as well.

=== First half ===
Tony Stewart set a rookie record by leading the first 31 laps before his first pit stop, somewhat earlier than the rest of the field, bringing up concerns over Team Menard's fuel mileage. Seven seconds behind, the pursuit was led by Roberto Guerrero, who had taken advantage of the restarts to pass Davy Jones and Eliseo Salazar. During the first pit stop window, Eddie Cheever dropped out of contention from fifth place because of a bad air wrench. Jones, meanwhile, had a slow stop that dropped him down to eighth, prompting Galles Racing to adopt a different fuel strategy.

Running 11 seconds behind Stewart, Eliseo Salazar went back to second place on Lap 47, and Arie Luyendyk, already in fifth position, touched the wall twice over a push condition, without damage. Another caution came out on Lap 50 after Johnny Parsons blew his engine, and Tony Stewart elected to pit again to rearrange his fuel situation, rejoining fourth, as well as Salazar. Roberto Guerrero led on the restart while Luyendyk unsuccessfully tried to pass Buddy Lazier, who benefitted from traffic. Ten laps later, Stéphan Grégoire retired with engine problems, after a well-timed first stop put him in the top 5.

Debris on the track stirred a new caution period on Lap 70, and a large group of drivers elected to pit, including the top 6 drivers, with Stewart conceding the effective lead of the race. Buddy Lazier left the pits first while Roberto Guerrero lost half a minute on his stop after a problem with the fuel nozzle and a brief stall. Arie Luyendyk also lost places to Tony Stewart, Eliseo Salazar and Alessandro Zampedri, but the Dutchman passed Salazar and Zampedri on the restart. Davy Jones chose not to pit during the caution, and led the proceedings until a green flag pit stop on Lap 87.

Just before the caution, Tony Stewart's engine developed boost pressure problems, with a suspected pop-off valve issue being feared by his engineers. Stewart, however, went after Buddy Lazier in a close pursuit when the race resumed. On Lap 81, his engine let go, pitting a lap later to retire from the race. Stewart blamed his blow-up on the unpopular pop-off valves delivered by USAC, which he described as "junk" and "garbage". Despite his early exit from the race, he would be recognized as the Rookie of the Year. Just behind him, Eddie Cheever made a pit stop, only to spin in front of Stewart's car when he left his box.

Arie Luyendyk caught up with Buddy Lazier and both drivers engaged in close pursuit until the caution came out on Lap 94, when Brad Murphey crashed in Turn 2. The leaders headed to the pits, where Luyendyk was on his way to beat Lazier, but he stalled the car. After it was refired, Luyendyk managed to rejoin the warm-up lane a few inches in front of Eliseo Salazar, who was on his right side. Suddenly, Salazar turned down on Luyendyk, and the collision sent Salazar into a wild spin through the grass and onto the track itself. Luyendyk's machine incurred damages on the nosecone, a broken suspension and broken bodywork. He lost five laps for repairs, and retired later in the race with 50 laps to go. Salazar's car also suffered heavy damage on its sidepod, but it was also repaired, and only lost a couple laps.

With Luyendyk, the lone former winner, out of contention, the race would have a first-time winner for the second year in a row, a first since 1990.

=== Second half ===
At the halfway point, eleven cars had dropped out, and nine more would follow suit in the next 50 laps. The race restarted on Lap 105 with Davy Jones in the lead. Roberto Guerrero passed Buddy Lazier on the restart, but Jones quickly put 10 seconds on the Colombian. During the stint, Richie Hearn unlapped himself by passing Jones, running in sixth place at the time.

Having lost twelve laps, the car of Fermín Vélez had a large fire while on the backstraight, bringing out the yellow on Lap 119. During the caution, Mike Groff, one of the lead runners in fifth place, suffered a broken oil line that spilled into his cockpit, managing to reach his pit box before rushing out of the car uninjured. Davy Jones and Roberto Guerrero pitted during the caution, but Buddy Lazier and Alessandro Zampedri did not, hoping to avoid a late pit stop at the end of the race. As the race was restarted, both Jones and Guerrero rapidly closed the gap on Lazier and Zampedri, who remained a second behind.

A caution on Lap 132, brought out by Mark Dismore's broken engine, proved timely in terms of fuel mileage for Buddy Lazier, Alessandro Zampedri and Richie Hearn, who took the opportunity to pit, the Italian driver making an additional stop to top off on fuel before the restart, and they were in position to finish the race with one more pit stop in the alternate strategy. Both Davy Jones and Roberto Guerrero needed a caution before one of their two expected pit stops, or after their rivals had theirs. Guerrero had passed Jones on Lap 129, led the field at the restart, and held off an attempt at an outside pass on Turn 3. Jim Guthrie pulled into the Turn 3 warm up lane after 148 laps with fire on his car, although the race stayed green.

On lap 150, IRL points leader Buzz Calkins retired from the race after a right rear upright broke heading into Turn 1. After stretching their tanks as far as possible, Roberto Guerrero stopped on Lap 160, and Davy Jones followed suit a lap later. Jones' faster stop put him several seconds ahead. However, Jones and Guerrero were expected to run out of fuel in the final two laps if the race was to finish without another yellow. Moments later, Scott Harrington, running nine laps down in the 16th spot, collided with Lyn St. James, five laps down in 15th place, as he tried to pass her on the inside of Turn 1. Both drivers crashed hard into the outside wall, and St. James suffered a broken wrist.

The resulting caution allowed Jones the opportunity to try and make it to the end on a conservative drive. Pagan Racing still weren't sure on Guerrero, and made a final pit stop on Lap 167 to top off, but the refueler inserted the nozzle awkwardly, the fuel spilled, and the car caught fire. It remained in good enough condition to keep racing, but his two-way radio became disconnected, and it was feared Guerrero would not have enough fuel at his disposal to make it to the end. As the rest of the leaders made their final pit stop, Buddy Lazier had a slow stop and left the pits behind Alessandro Zampedri. As such, the order was led by Jones, followed by Zampedri, Lazier, Guerrero and Richie Hearn, the final car on the lead lap, who also pitted.

For the restart, the lapped car of Eliseo Salazar was lined up just in front of Jones. As the green came out on Lap 169, Salazar blocked Jones exiting turn four. Down the frontstretch, Jones attempted to pass Salazar, but the Chilean swept to the inside, forcing Jones to brush the inside wall. It was Salazar's second controversial move of the race; Scandia's team owner Andy Evans later admitted the move was intentional, in an attempt to help Zampedri. The Italian took advantage of the situation and passed Jones on the outside of Turn 1. During his stint as the race leader, his team became increasingly worried over the car's fuel consumption, at two miles per gallon, being too high to make it to the end without stopping again.

=== Finish ===
Davy Jones managed to stay within a second of Alessandro Zampedri for about 20 laps, despite being low on fuel and nursing some suspension damage from the Salazar incident, with Buddy Lazier some three seconds behind. On Lap 189, Zampedri's car developed handling issues and he understeered in Turn 3, allowing Jones to take the lead on the inside of Turn 4. A lap later, Lazier used Turn 3 to pass Zampedri on the outside, and went after Jones, who was told by the team to enter in "full lean mode". Lazier, running full-rich, passed Jones for the lead down the front stretch with 8 laps to go, and began to pull away, running laps over 232 mph.

With six laps to go, Eddie Cheever's car began smoking in Turn 2, laying down fluid on the track. Two laps later, also in Turn 2, Scott Sharp spun out of sixth place, and crashed into the inside wall, prompting a late yellow. During the caution, as he had done previously, Lazier raised his hands out of the cockpit to stretch his fingers and alleviate his increasing back pain. Track crews quickly cleaned up the incident, and the race was restarted with one lap to go, the green and white flags being displayed at the starter's stand simultaneously.

Decisively, Lazier had managed to lap Michel Jourdain Jr. before the caution came out, and Jones, who had the chance to run full speed and catch Lazier, lagged too far behind to make an early move on Jourdain, doing so on the backstraight. That was enough of an advantage for Lazier, who held off the challenge by six tenths of a second to win his first Indy 500, which was his first Indy car race win as well. Six seconds behind, rookie Richie Hearn finished third, having passed Zampedri just before the caution. It was the first Indy car podium finish for all three drivers, accounting for six top-10 finishes between all of them before this race; Lazier and Jones had never finished higher than seventh.

As the leaders crossed the finish line, a serious crash occurred in Turn 4. Fifth-placed Roberto Guerrero, who had lost a lap after pitting with 10 to go, was defending his position from Eliseo Salazar, but he was not aware that he had a lap over Salazar because of his two-way radio not working. Running hard on the final lap, he spun in turn 4 and slid in front of Salazar and Alessandro Zampedri, who was between them after falling behind a group of lapped cars. Zampedri's car was pushed up, and flew up into the catch fence nose first. Salazar slid underneath Zampedri's car, and wrecked into the outside wall. Guerrero slid down the track, and came to rest in the pit area. Zampedri suffered serious injuries to his feet and nearly lost his left foot, requiring the amputation of three toes, but was able to make a remarkable comeback a year later. Due to the high attrition, and as the nearest contenders (Danny Ongais, Hideshi Matsuda and Robbie Buhl) were 3 laps down to them, all three drivers involved in the crash retained their positions.

=== Post-race ===
This victory was the first for Buddy Lazier in championship-level Indy car competition. Lazier had won races, and a championship, in the American Indycar Series, a minor league series that employed older CART machinery, but his previous best result in CART competition had been a 7th place at the Michigan 500 in 1992. In fact, he had never seen the checkered flag in his three previous Indy 500 runnings, and he had failed to qualify for the race four times. Lazier became the first American driver to score his first Indy car win at the Indy 500 since Troy Ruttman in 1952, and the first overall since Arie Luyendyk (1990). For Davy Jones (2nd), Alessandro Zampedri (4th) and Hideshi Matsuda (8th), this would be the best result of their Indy car careers.

At the conclusion of the race, Scott Sharp and Buzz Calkins wound up tied for first place in the points championship. The regulations did not have a tie-breaker provision at the time, so the two drivers were declared co-champions of the inaugural IRL season. Had the usual tie-breaker rules been in place, Calkins would have been declared champion because of his win at Walt Disney World Speedway. Additionally, he went on to score the most points among IRL drivers in the calendar year 1996, with races at New Hampshire and Las Vegas being held later in the year to start the 1996–97 season.

Ford scored its eighth Indy 500 win as an engine manufacturer, on which would become its final year in the race as of 2025. The company provided its engines to the IRL for the five 1996 races, but generally sided with CART during the open-wheel racing split. The company did consult with the IRL during planning stages for the 1997 normally aspirated engine formula, but ultimately elected not to build engines to those specs. Ford-Cosworth continued to focus on CART and Champ Car, being the lone engine supplier during the last years of the series, and ended its American open-wheel involvement after the 2008 unification following that years Toyota Grand Prix of Long Beach.

== Box score ==
Pos	No.	Driver	Team	Chassis	Engine	Tire	Laps	Status	Pit Stops	Grid	Pts.
1	91	(United States) Buddy Lazier	Hemelgarn Racing	Reynard 95I	Ford Cosworth XB	F	200	147.956 mph	5	5	35
2	70	(United States) Davy Jones	Galles Racing	Lola T95/00	Mercedes-Benz/Ilmor D	G	200	+0.695	5	2	33
3	4	(United States) Richie Hearn R	Della Penna Motorsports	Reynard 95I	Ford Cosworth XB	G	200	+7.019	6	15	32
4	8	(Italy) Alessandro Zampedri	Team Scandia	Lola T95/00	Ford Cosworth XB	G	199	Accident	6	7	31
5	21	(Colombia) Roberto Guerrero	Pagan Racing	Reynard 95I	Ford Cosworth XB	G	198	Accident	6	6	30
6	7	(Chile) Eliseo Salazar	Team Scandia	Lola T95/00	Ford Cosworth XB	G	197	Accident	8	3	29
7	32	(United States) Danny Ongais	Team Menard	Lola T95/00	Menard Indy V-6	F	197	-3 laps	8	33	28
8	52	(Japan) Hideshi Matsuda	Beck Motorsports	Lola T94/00	Ford Cosworth XB	F	197	-3 laps	7	30	27
9	54	(United States) Robbie Buhl R	Beck Motorsports	Lola T94/00	Ford Cosworth XB	F	197	-3 laps	6	23	26
10	11	(United States) Scott Sharp	A. J. Foyt Enterprises	Lola T95/00	Ford Cosworth XB	G	194	Accident	5	21	25
11	3	(United States) Eddie Cheever	Team Menard	Lola T95/00	Menard Indy V-6	F	189	-11 laps	7	4	24
12	14	(United States) Davey Hamilton R	A. J. Foyt Enterprises	Lola T95/00	Ford Cosworth XB	G	181	-19 laps	5	10	23
13	22	(Mexico) Michel Jourdain Jr. R	Team Scandia	Lola T95/00	Ford Cosworth XB	G	177	-23 laps	5	8	22
14	45	(United States) Lyn St. James	Zunne Group Racing	Lola T94/00	Ford Cosworth XB	G	153	Accident	5	18	21
15	44	(United States) Scott Harrington R	Della Penna Motorsports	Reynard 95I	Ford Cosworth XB	G	150	Accident	6	32	20
16	5	(Netherlands) Arie Luyendyk W	Byrd/Treadway Racing	Reynard 94I	Ford Cosworth XB	F	149	Damage	5	20	19
17	12	(United States) Buzz Calkins R	Bradley Motorsports	Reynard 95I	Ford Cosworth XB	F	148	Brake failure	6	9	18
18	27	(United States) Jim Guthrie R	Blueprint Racing	Lola T93/00	Menard Indy V-6	F	144	Engine	4	19	17
19	30	(United States) Mark Dismore R	Team Menard	Lola T95/00	Menard Indy V-6	F	129	Engine	6	14	16
20	60	(United States) Mike Groff	Walker Racing	Reynard 95I	Ford Cosworth XB	G	122	Fire	4	11	15
21	34	(Spain) Fermín Vélez R	Team Scandia	Lola T95/00	Ford Cosworth XB	G	107	Engine fire	2	28	14
22	43	(United States) Joe Gosek R	Team Scandia	Lola T94/00	Ford Cosworth XB	G	106	Radiator	5	31	13
23	10	(United States) Brad Murphey R	Hemelgarn Racing	Reynard 94I	Ford Cosworth XB	F	91	Suspension	2	26	12
24	20	(United States) Tony Stewart R	Team Menard	Lola T95/00	Menard Indy V-6	F	82	Engine	4	1	11
25	90	(United States) Racin Gardner R	Team Scandia	Lola T94/00	Ford Cosworth XB	G	76	Suspension	5	25	10
26	41	(Brazil) Marco Greco	A. J. Foyt Enterprises	Lola T94/00	Ford Cosworth XB	G	64	Engine	2	22	9
27	9	(France) Stéphan Grégoire	Hemelgarn Racing	Reynard 95I	Ford Cosworth XB	F	59	Coil pack fire	2	13	8
28	16	(United States) Johnny Parsons	Blueprint Racing	Lola T93/00	Menard Indy V-6	F	48	Radiator	1	27	7
29	75	(United States) Johnny O'Connell R	Cunningham Racing	Reynard 95I	Ford Cosworth XB	F	47	Fuel pickup	2	29	6
30	33	(Italy) Michele Alboreto R	Team Scandia	Reynard 95I	Ford Cosworth XB	G	43	Gearbox	3	12	5
31	18	(United States) John Paul Jr.	PDM Racing	Lola T93/00	Menard Indy V-6	G	10	Ignition	2	17	4
32	96	(United States) Paul Durant R	ABF Motorsports	Lola T92/00	Buick V-6	G	9	Engine	0	24	3
33	64	(United States) Johnny Unser R	Project Indy	Reynard 95I	Ford Cosworth XB	G	0	Transmission	0	16	2

W Former Indianapolis 500 winner

R Indianapolis 500 Rookie

=== Race statistics ===
Lap Leaders
Laps	Leader
1–31	Tony Stewart
32–37	Roberto Guerrero
38–41	Buddy Lazier
42–54	Tony Stewart
55–70	Roberto Guerrero
71–86	Davy Jones
87–97	Buddy Lazier
98–120	Davy Jones
121–133	Buddy Lazier
134–158	Roberto Guerrero
159–160	Davy Jones
161–167	Buddy Lazier
168–169	Davy Jones
170–189	Alessandro Zampedri
190–192	Davy Jones
193–200	Buddy Lazier

Total laps led
Driver	Laps
Roberto Guerrero	47
Davy Jones	46
Tony Stewart	44
Buddy Lazier	43
Alessandro Zampedri	20

Cautions: 10 for 59 laps
Laps	Reason
3–5	Debris
11–16	Paul Durant spun in turn 3
18–20	Danny Ongais spun in turn 3
50–55	Johnny Parsons smoking
69–73	Debris
94–105	Brad Murphey crashed in turn 2
119–124	Fermín Vélez engine fire
132–139	Mark Dismore stalled on backstretch
162–168	Scott Harrington, Lyn St. James crash in turn 1
196–199	Scott Sharp crash in turn 2

Tire participation chart
Supplier	No. of starters
Goodyear	19
Firestone	14*
* - Denotes race winner

== Final IRL standings after the race ==
Drivers' Championship standings

Pos	Driver	Points
1	(United States) Buzz Calkins	246
1	(United States) Scott Sharp	246
3	(United States) Robbie Buhl	240
4	(United States) Richie Hearn	237
4	(Colombia) Roberto Guerrero	237

- Note: Only the top five positions are included for the standings.
- Note: There was no engine manufacturer championship until the 1996–1997 season.

== Broadcasting ==
=== Radio ===
The race was carried live on the IMS Radio Network. Bob Jenkins served as chief announcer for the seventh year. Johnny Rutherford served as "driver expert". The first 500 as part of the Indy Racing League saw a few changes on the broadcasting crew.

Larry Henry, along with Sally Larvick, left the crew, and instead joined the CART radio network for the U.S. 500 (which was anchored by Lou Palmer). Bob Forbes was also gone from the on-air team. Gary Lee shifted over to fill the vacancy in turn three, while newcomers Vince Welch and Mark Jaynes joined as pit reporters.

Indianapolis Motor Speedway Radio Network
Booth Announcers	Turn Reporters	Pit/garage reporters
Chief Announcer: Bob Jenkins; Driver expert: Johnny Rutherford; Statistician: Howdy Bell; Historian: Donald Davidson; Commentary: Chris Economaki	Turn 1: Jerry Baker; Turn 2: Ken Double; Turn 3: Gary Lee; Turn 4: Bob Lamey	Mark Jaynes R (north/center pits); Vince Welch R (center pits); Mike King (south pits); Chuck Marlowe (garages)

=== Television ===
The race was carried live flag-to-flag coverage in the United States on ABC Sports. ABC announced that they had signed a two-year deal to televise all the events of the newly formed Indy Racing League. The deal would include all events contested in 1996, and carry through the 1997 Indy 500. On pole day of the 1996 race, ABC signed a two-year extension with the Speedway to cover the Indy 500 itself through 1999.

Paul Page served as host and play-by-play announcer. Sam Posey left ABC, and was no longer with the broadcast. Bobby Unser (turn 2) and Danny Sullivan (booth) served as color commentators.

This would be the final 500 for ABC Executive Producer Jack O'Hara, who would be killed in TWA Flight 800 less than two months later.

The ratings for the 1996 telecast dropped considerably from a 9.4/28 share in 1995 to a 7.1/23. This was largely attributed to the ongoing controversy regarding the IRL/CART "split" and the rival U.S. 500 broadcast, which overlapped slightly on ESPN.

ABC Television
Booth Announcers	Pit/garage reporters
Host/Announcer: Paul Page; Color: Danny Sullivan; Color/Turn 2: Bobby Unser	Jack Arute; Gary Gerould; Dr. Jerry Punch

Practice and time trials were carried over three networks: ABC, ESPN, and ESPN2.

- Live Daily Reports (ESPN2): Dave Despain, Danny Sullivan, Jon Beekhuis, Dr. Jerry Punch, Gary Gerould, Mike King, Marty Reid
- Time trials (ABC): Paul Page, Bobby Unser, Danny Sullivan, Jack Arute, Dr. Jerry Punch, Gary Gerould
- Time trials (ESPN/ESPN2): Dave Despain, Danny Sullivan, Jon Beekhuis, Dr. Jerry Punch, Gary Gerould, Mike King, Marty Reid

== Notes ==
=== See also ===
- U.S. 500
- 1996 in IRL

=== Works cited ===
- 1996 Indianapolis 500 Day-By-Day Trackside Report for the Media
- Indianapolis 500 History: Race & All-Time Stats - Official Site
- 1996 Indianapolis 500 Radio Broadcast, Indianapolis Motor Speedway Radio Network
- 1996 Indianapolis 500 - The 239.260 car

=== External links ===
- Official box score - Indy500.com

Previous race: 1996 Dura Lube 200	Indy Racing League; 1996 season	Next race: 1996 True Value 200 (1996–97 season)
Previous race: 1995 Indianapolis 500 (IndyCar)	Indianapolis 500	Next race: 1997 Indianapolis 500
