= Brad Murphey =

American racing driver

Brad Murphey (born December 27, 1955, in Tucson, Arizona), is a former American racecar driver in the Indy Racing League. He raced in the 1996 and 1996-1997 seasons for Hemelgarn Racing with three career starts, including the Indianapolis 500 where he was credited with 23rd place, but never finished a race or led a lap. His last IRL race was the inaugural 500K at Las Vegas Motor Speedway where his right leg/pelvis was broken while involved in an accident with Eddie Cheever and Stephane Gregoire on lap 29.

Murphey also has prior experience in Indy Lights, Trans-Am Series, Formula Super Vee, Formula Ford, and HotRod racing. In 1984, he attempted to qualify for the CART races at Mid Ohio and Las Vegas, but failed to do so.

Despite many websites stating that he is Australian, Murphey was born and raised in Arizona and has in fact never been to Australia. He believes the misconception was because most of his race crew during his entire career was from Australia or New Zealand and that the phenomenon of him being incorrectly identified as Australian predates the internet.

== American Open Wheel racing ==
=== CART IndyCar ===
(key)

Year	Team	Series	1	2	3	4	5	6	7	8	9	10	11	12	13	14	15	16	Rank	Points	Ref
1984	Wysard Racing	CART	LBH	PHX1	INDY	MIL	POR	MEA	CLE	MIS1	ROA	POC	MOH; DNQ	SAN	MIS2	PHX2	LAG	LVG; DNQ	NC	0	

=== Indy Lights ===
(key)

Year	Team	Series	1	2	3	4	5	6	7	8	9	10	11	12	Rank	Points
1986	Louis Motorsports	ARS	PHX1	MIL	MEA; 5	TOR; 6	POC; 9	MOH; 9	ROA	LS; 10	PHX2	MIA; 9			12th	33
1987	TEAMKAR International	ARS	LBH	PHX	MIL; 8	MEA; 9	CLE; 11	TOR; 7	POC	MOH	NAZ	LS; 9	MIA; Ret		12th	22
1988	TEAMKAR International	ARS	PHX; 10	MIL; 12	POR	CLE	TOR; 10	MEA	POC	MOH	ROA; Ret	NAZ	LS	MIA	19th	8

=== IRL IndyCar Series ===
(key)

Year	Team	Series	1	2	3	4	5	6	7	8	9	10	Rank	Points	Ref
1996	Hemelgarn Racing	IRL	WDW	PHX	INDY; 23								34th	12	
1996–97	Hemelgarn Racing	IRL	NHM; 18	LVS; 27	WDW	PHX	INDY	TXS	PPIR	CLT	NH2	LV2	38th	25	

== Trivia ==
He is often referred to as "Bronco" Brad Murphey, as he is a former bronco riding champion.
