= Joe Gosek =

Joseph Edward Gosek (born March 11, 1956, in Oswego, New York), is a Supermodified race car driver. He also raced in the 1996 Indianapolis 500, finishing 22nd. Gosek was nicknamed 'Double-O Joe' for his traditional use of car number '00'.

Gosek has been victorious in numerous races at the Oswego Speedway in Oswego, New York, including its crown jewel; the International Classic 200, which he has won three times. Gosek is also a multi-time champion on the touring International Supermodified Association.

== IRL IndyCar Series ==
Year	Team	Chassis	No.	Engine	1	2	3	4	5	6	7	8	9	10	11	Rank	Points	Ref
1996	Team Scandia	Lola T94	43	Ford Cosworth	WDW	PHX	INDY; 22									33rd	13	
1996-97	ABF Motorsports	Lola T92	96	Buick	NH1; 21	LV1	WDW	PHX	INDY	TEX	PIK	CMS	NH2	LV2		49th	14	
1998	Liberty Racing	G-Force GF01B	29	Oldsmobile	WDW	PHX	INDY; DNQ	TXS	NHS	DOV	CLT	PIK	ATL	TEX	LSV	-	0	

== Indy 500 results ==
Year	Chassis	Engine	Start	Finish	Team	Ref
1996	Lola	Ford-Cosworth	31st	22nd	Scandia	
