= Johnny Unser =

American racing driver (born 1958)

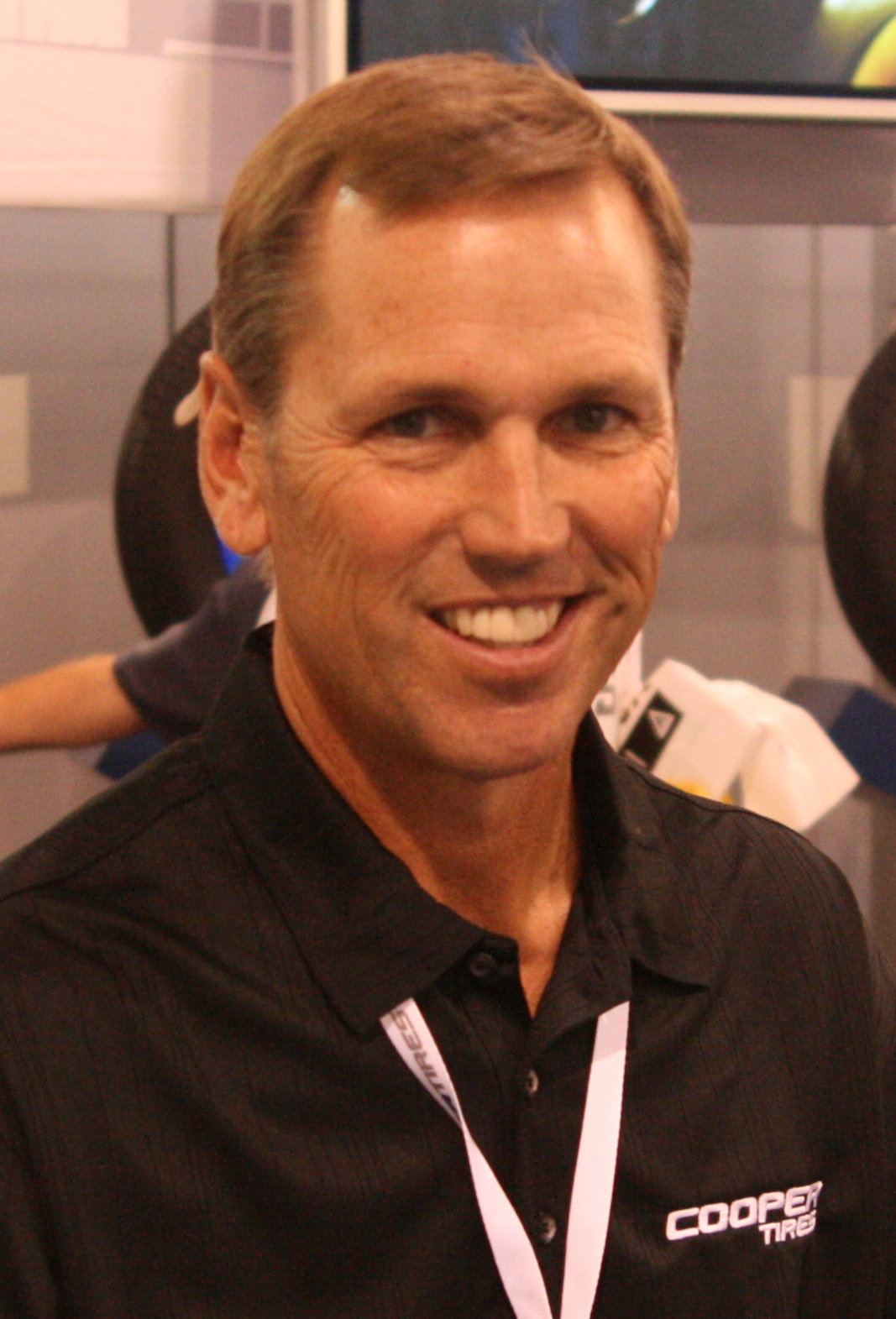
- Unser in 2009
- Nationality: (United States) American
- Born: John William Unser; October 22, 1958 (age 68) Long Beach, California, U.S.
- Retired: 2001
- Relatives: Jerry Unser (father); Al Unser (uncle); Bobby Unser (uncle); Al Unser Jr. (cousin); Robby Unser (cousin)

Indy Racing League IndyCar Series
- Years active: 1996–2000
- Teams: Project Indy; Byrd-Cunningham Racing; Hemelgarn Racing
- Starts: 15
- Wins: 0
- Poles: 0
- Fastest laps: 0
- Best finish: 24th in 1996–1997

Previous series
- 1993–1994: CART

John William Unser (born October 22, 1958) is an American former race car driver. He is the son of open wheel driver Jerry Unser Jr., cousin of Al Unser Jr. and Robby Unser, nephew of Al Unser and Bobby Unser, and first cousin once removed of Alfred Unser.

Unser's father, Jerry, died in a racing accident when Unser was seven months old. He made five starts in CART in 1993 and 1994 with a best result of fifteenth. He joined the Indy Racing League in its inaugural 1996 season, but had a transmission failure during the pace lap of what would've been his first Indianapolis 500 and was not credited with completing any laps. In 1997, he made his first start in the Indy 500 starting in the 35th position after League and Speedway owner Tony George added his and Lyn St. James' car to the field because slower cars than theirs were guaranteed starting positions because of prior races. He went on to finish eighteenth, his best "500" result in five starts. Unser drove the majority of his IRL races for Hemelgarn Racing and in his 14 career IRL starts he had a best finish of ninth in his first series start in 1996 at Phoenix International Raceway. His last major open wheel race was the 2000 Indy 500.

On January 14, 2008, Unser was named as the race director for the 2008 Champ Car Atlantic Championship.

Unser's daughter Loni is now a racing driver.

== Racing record ==
=== American Open Wheel ===
(key)

==== CART ====
Year	Team	1	2	3	4	5	6	7	8	9	10	11	12	13	14	15	16	Rank	Points	Ref
1993	Dale Coyne Racing	SRF	PHX	LBH	INDY	MIL	DET	POR; 18	CLE	TOR; 17	MIC	NHA; 18	ROA	VAN; 21	MDO	NAZ	LS	44th	0	
1994	Dale Coyne Racing	SRF	PHX; DNQ	LBH; DNQ	INDY	MIL; DNQ	DET	POR	CLE	TOR	MIC	MDO	NHA; 15	VAN	ROA	NAZ	LS	39th	0	

==== IndyCar ====
Year	Team	1	2	3	4	5	6	7	8	9	10	11	Rank	Points	Ref
1996	Project Indy	WDW	PHX; 9	INDY; 33									24th	56	
1996-97	Project Indy	NHM; DNQ	LVS; 22	WDW	PHX								24th	107	
1996-97	Hemelgarn Racing					INDY; 18					LV2; 19		24th	107	
1996-97	Byrd-Cunningham Racing						TXS; 10	PPIR; 21	CLT	NH2; 13			24th	107	
1998	Hemelgarn Racing	WDW	PHX	INDY; 25	TXS	NHM	DOV	CLT	PPIR	ATL	TX2	LVS	40th	5	
1999	Hemelgarn Racing	WDW	PHX	CLT; C	INDY; 32	TXS; 15	PPIR; 13	ATL; 13	DOV	PPI2	LVS; 23	TX2; DNQ	27th	57	
2000	Indy Regency Racing	WDW	PHX	LVS	INDY; 22	TXS	PPIR	ATL	KTY	TX2			42nd	8	

==== Indianapolis 500 results ====
Year	Chassis	Engine	Start	Finish
1996	Reynard	Ford-Cosworth	16th	33rd
1997	Dallara	Infiniti	35th	18th
1998	Dallara	Oldsmobile	25th	25th
1999	Dallara	Oldsmobile	30th	32nd
2000	G-Force	Oldsmobile	30th	22nd

=== 24 Hours of Le Mans results ===
Year	Team	Co-drivers	Car	Class	Laps	Pos.	Class pos.
1995	(United States) Callaway Competition	(Italy) Enrico Bertaggia (Germany) Frank Jelinski	Callaway Corvette	LMGT2	273	9th	2nd
