= Paul Durant =

American racing driver (born 1959)

Paul Durant (born September 26, 1959) is an American former racecar driver from San Diego, California.

Durant first excelled in supermodified racing, winning a number of regional championships. He then competed in the USAC Silver Crown Series in 1994. Following the founding of the Indy Racing League in 1996, he competed in the series' second ever race at the Phoenix International Raceway but broke on the first lap. Two months later, he competed in the Indianapolis 500, qualifying the oldest car in the field, a 1992 Lola powered by a stock-block Buick V6 engine in the 24th position. He moved up from 24th to eighteenth in nine laps before his engine failed. The following year, he took over A. J. Foyt Enterprises' No. 1 car late on bump day and qualified in the final position with only twelve laps of practice in the car. He crashed on lap 111 of the race and was credited with 21st. Later that season, he drove at Las Vegas Motor Speedway for Byrd-Cunningham Racing and finished 26th after a mechanical issue on lap 62. He drove in the first race of the 1998 season at Phoenix for Cobb Racing, but suffered an engine failure 99 laps in. He failed to qualify for the 1998 Indianapolis 500 in the same car and his entry failed to arrive at the race the following week at Texas Motor Speedway despite being entered.

Durant currently lives in Denver, Colorado.

== Racing record ==
=== American Open Wheel ===
(key)

==== IndyCar ====
| Year | Team | 1 | 2 | 3 | 4 | 5 | 6 | 7 | 8 | 9 | 10 | 11 | Rank | Points | Ref |
|---|---|---|---|---|---|---|---|---|---|---|---|---|---|---|---|
| 1996 | ABF Motorsports | WDW | PHX; 22 | INDY; 32 | | | | | | | | | 27th | 32 | |
| 1996-97 | A. J. Foyt Enterprises | NHM | LVS | WDW | PHX | INDY; 21 | TXS | PPIR | CLT | NH2 | | | 40th | 23 | |
| 1996-97 | Byrd-Cunningham Racing | | | | | | | | | | LV2; 26 | | 40th | 23 | |
| 1998 | CBR Cobb Racing | WDW | PHX; 21 | INDY; DNQ | TXS | NHM | DOV | CLT | PPIR | ATL | TX2 | LVS | 38th | 9 | |

==== Indy 500 results ====
| Year | Chassis | Engine | Start | Finish | Team | Ref |
|---|---|---|---|---|---|---|
| 1996 | Lola | Buick | 24th | 32nd | ABF | |
| 1997 | G-Force | Oldsmobile | 33rd | 21st | Foyt | |
| 1998 | G-Force | Oldsmobile | Failed to Qualify | | Cobb | |
