= Tyce Carlson =

American racing driver

Brendyn "Tyce" Carlson
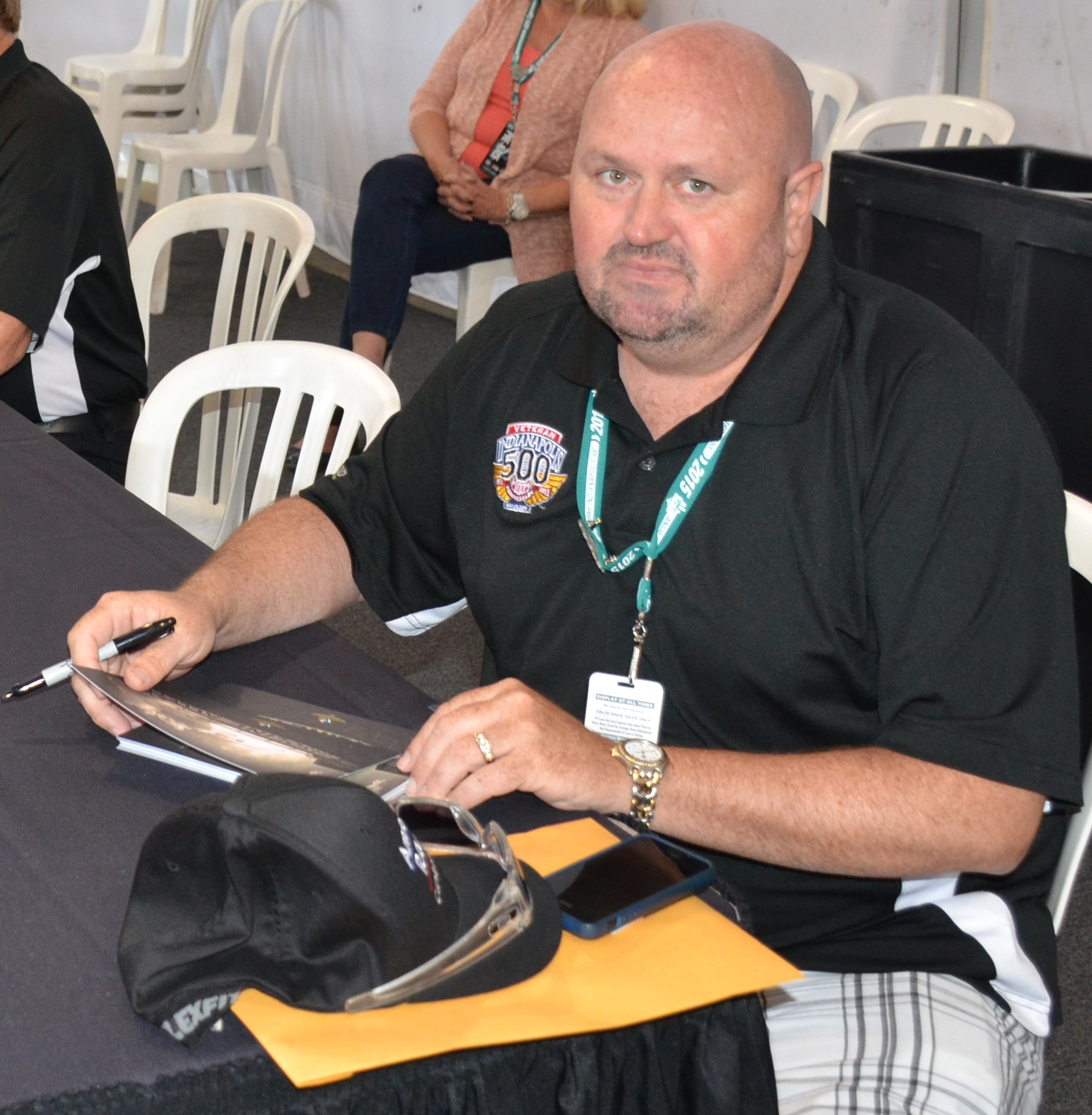
- Carlson at the 2015 Indianapolis 500
- Born: September 23, 1970 (age 56) Indianapolis, Indiana, U.S.

Indy Racing League IndyCar Series
- Years active: 1996–2002
- Teams: Immke Racing; PDM Racing; Team Pelfrey; Tri-Star Racing
- Starts: 30
- Wins: 0
- Poles: 0
- Best finish: 19th in 1999

Brendyn "Tyce" Carlson (born September 23, 1970, Indianapolis, Indiana), is a former driver in the Indy Racing League IndyCar Series. He raced in the 1996–2002 seasons with thirty career starts, including two at the Indianapolis 500. His two career IndyCar top-ten finishes both came at the Las Vegas Motor Speedway in the 1999 and 2000 races. He was forced to take several years off after repeated concussions but regained his health and from 2005 to 2007 sought a return to the Indy 500, however he failed to secure a ride. He drove in the 2006 Freedom 100 Indy Pro Series event. He now is a co-owner of a Firestone Indy Lights team (formerly the Indy Pro Series), Fan Force United.

== American open-wheel racing results ==
=== IRL IndyCar Series ===
Year	Team	Chassis	No.	Engine	1	2	3	4	5	6	7	8	9	10	11	12	13	14	15	Rank	Points	Ref
1996	Brickell Racing	Lola T93	77	Menard	WDW	PHX	INDY; DNQ													-	0	
1996-97	PDM Racing	Lola T931 Dallara IR72	28	Menard1 Oldsmobile2	NH1; 11	LV1; 23	WDW	PHX												25th	84	
1996-97	PDM Racing	Lola T931 Dallara IR72	18	Menard1 Oldsmobile2					INDY; 19	TEX; 14	PIK	CMS	NH2							25th	84	
1996-97	IZ Racing	Dallara IR7	95	Infiniti										LV2; 24						25th	84	
1998	Immke Racing	Dallara IR8	20	Oldsmobile	WDW; 11	PHX; 13	INDY; DNQ													27th	73	
1998	Team Pelfrey	Dallara IR8	81	Oldsmobile				TEX; 12	NHS	DOV										27th	73	
1998	PDM Racing	G-Force GF01B	18	Oldsmobile							CLT; 12	PIK	ATL	TEX	LSV					27th	73	
1999	Blueprint-Immke Racing	Dallara IR9	20	Oldsmobile Aurora V8	WDW; 12	PHX; 23	CLT; C^{1}	INDY; 14	TEX; 21	PIK; 23	ATL; 20	DOV; 11	PIK; 17	LSV; 9	TEX; 13					19th	139	
2000	Hubbard-Immke Racing	Dallara	20	Oldsmobile	WDW; 13	PHX; 15	LSV; 8	INDY; DNQ	TEX; 13	PIK; 11	ATL; 13	KTY; 22	TEX; 23							19th	124	
2001	Tri-Star Motorsports	Dallara	6	Oldsmobile	PHX; 15	HOM	ATL	INDY; DNQ	TEX	PIK	RIR	KAN	NSH	KTY	GAT	CHI	TEX			42nd	15	
2002	PDM Racing	Dallara	18	Chevrolet	HOM; 11	PHX; DNS	CAL	NAZ	INDY	TEX	PIK	RIR	KAN	NSH	MIS	KTY	GAT	CHI	TEX	41st	23	

^{1} The 1999 VisionAire 500K at Charlotte was cancelled after 79 laps due to spectator fatalities.

=== Indianapolis 500 results ===
Year	Chassis	Engine	Start	Finish
1996	Lola	Menard-Buick	Failed to Qualify	
1997	Dallara	Oldsmobile	26th	19th
1998	Dallara	Oldsmobile	Practice Crash	
1999	Dallara	Oldsmobile	15th	14th
2000	Dallara	Oldsmobile	Practice Crash	
2001	Dallara	Oldsmobile	Failed to Qualify	

=== Indy Lights ===
Year	Team	1	2	3	4	5	6	7	8	9	10	11	12	Rank	Points
2006	AFS Racing	HMS	STP1	STP2	INDY; 15	WGL	IMS	NSH	MIL	KTY	SNM1	SNM2	CHI	41st	15
