= Affonso Giaffone =

Brazilian racing driver

Affonso Giaffone Neto
- Born: Affonso Giaffone Neto; April 6, 1968 (age 58) Santos, São Paulo, Brazil
- Teams: Brian Stewart Racing, Team Scandia, Chitwood Motorsports, Team Coulson Racing
- Starts: 8 (Indy Racing League)

Affonso Giaffone Neto (born April 6, 1968) is a Brazilian former racing driver. He is one of several racing drivers in his family; he is a cousin of Felipe Giaffone, and a cousin-in-law of Rubens Barrichello. His father Affonso Giaffone Jr. was also a racing driver.

Giaffone raced in the 1996–1997 Indy Racing League season with eight career starts, including the 1997 Indianapolis 500. His best career finish was in fourth position at Charlotte Motor Speedway in 1997. Before the IRL he finished third in the 1995 Indy Lights championship behind Greg Moore and Robbie Buhl. He was the 1991 Formula Three Sudamericana Champion with five victories.

== Motorsports Career Results ==
=== American open–wheel racing results ===
(key)

==== Indy Lights ====
Year	Team	1	2	3	4	5	6	7	8	9	10	11	12	Rank	Points	Ref
1995	Brian Stewart Racing	MIA; 8	PHX; 5	LBH; 25	NAZ; 2	MIL; 2	DET; 5	POR; 2	TOR; 4	CLE; 23	NHA; 6	VAN; 4	LS; 2	3rd	122	

==== Indy Racing League ====
Year	Team	1	2	3	4	5	6	7	8	9	10	11	Rank	Points	Ref
1996-97	Team Scandia	NHM	LVS; 10	WDW									16th	159	
1996-97	Chitwood Motorsports				PHX; 13	INDY; 32	TXS; 20	PPI; 9	CLT; 4	NH2; 18	LV2; 15		16th	159	
1998	Team Coulson Racing	WDW; DNQ	PHX	INDY	TXS	NHM	DOV	CLT	PPIR	ATL	TX2	LVS	NC	-	

Sporting positions
Preceded by Christian Fittipaldi	Formula Three Sudamericana Champion; 1991	Succeeded by Marcos Gueiros
