= Buzz Calkins =

American racing driver (born 1971)

Bradley "Buzz" Calkins
- Nationality: American
- Born: May 2, 1971 (age 55) Denver, Colorado, U.S.
- Retired: 2001

Indy Racing League IndyCar Series
- Years active: 1996-2001
- Teams: Bradley Motorsports
- Starts: 53
- Wins: 1
- Podiums: 3
- Fastest laps: 0
- Best finish: 1st in 1996

Previous series
- 1993-1995: Indy Lights

Championship titles
- 1996: Indy Racing League

Bradley Hobson "Buzz" Calkins Jr. (born May 2, 1971 in Denver, Colorado) is a former Indy Racing League driver. After a successful run in Indy Lights from 1993 to 1995, where he finished eleventh, tenth, and sixth in his three seasons, he and his Bradley Motorsports team purchased a 1995 Reynard chassis to compete in the inaugural season of the IRL. Calkins won the series' inaugural race, the 1996 Indy 200 at Walt Disney World ahead of Tony Stewart and was that year's league co-champion with Scott Sharp. He competed in the Indianapolis 500 six times, with a best finish of tenth in 1998. His win in the series' first race would end up to be his only IRL win. Calkins graduated from the University of Colorado Boulder in 1993. Calkins earned a Master of Business Administration from Kellogg School of Management at Northwestern University in 2000. He drove until 2001 when he retired and ventured into the business world. He served as president of his father's company, Bradley Petroleum, until its sale in 2017.

== Motorsports career results ==
=== SCCA National Championship Runoffs ===
Year	Track	Car	Engine	Class	Finish	Start	Status
1990	Road Atlanta	Swift DB1	Ford	Formula Ford	DNS		Did not start

=== American open-wheel racing ===
(key) (Races in bold indicate pole position)

==== Indy Lights ====
Year	Team	1	2	3	4	5	6	7	8	9	10	11	12	Rank	Points	Ref
1993	Bradley Motorsports	PHX	LBH; 11	MIL; 4	DET; 10	POR; 11	CLE; 13	TOR; 17	NHA; 4	VAN; 11	MDO; 13	NAZ; 6	LS; 10	**11th**	**44**	
1994	Bradley Motorsports	PHX; 8	LBH; 14	MIL; 8	DET; 11	POR; 7	CLE; 10	TOR; 7	MDO; 10	NHA; 6	VAN; 10	NAZ; 19	LS; 19	**10th**	**41**	
1995	Bradley Motorsports	MIA; 9	PHX; 3	LBH; 16	NAZ; 4	MIL; 3	DET; 7	POR; 5	TOR; 8	CLE; 5	NHA; 17	VAN; 11	LS; 13	**6th**	**77**	

==== Indy Racing League ====
Year	Team	Chassis	No.	Engine	1	2	3	4	5	6	7	8	9	10	11	12	13	Rank	Points	Ref
1996	Bradley Motorsports	Reynard 95i	12	Ford XB V8t	WDW; 1	PHX; 6	INDY; 17											1st-tie	246	
1996-97	Bradley Motorsports	Reynard 95i	12	Ford XB V8t	NWH; 2	LVS; 6												10th	204	
1996-97	Bradley Motorsports	G-Force GF01	12	Oldsmobile Aurora V8			WDW; 11	PHX; 8	INDY; 11	TXS; 19	PPI; 5	CLT	NH2; 21	LV2; 28				10th	204	
1998	Bradley Motorsports	G-Force GF01B	12	Oldsmobile Aurora V8	WDW; 14	PHX; 9	INDY; 10	TXS; 15	NWH; 15	DOV; Wth	CLT	PPIR; 24						19th	134	
1998	Bradley Motorsports	Dallara IR8	12	Oldsmobile Aurora V8									ATL; 28	TX2; 11	LVS; 11			19th	134	
1999	Bradley Motorsports	Dallara IR9	12	Oldsmobile Aurora V8	WDW; 17	PHX; 14												13th	201	
1999	Bradley Motorsports	G-Force GF01C	12	Oldsmobile Aurora V8			CLT; C	INDY; 19	TXS; 9	PPI; 14	ATL; 5	DOV; 8	PPI2; 15	LVS; 5	TX2; 8			13th	201	
2000	Bradley Motorsports	Dallara IR-00	12	Oldsmobile Aurora V8	WDW; 8	PHX; 23	LVS; 25	INDY; 18	TXS; 4	PPI; 12	ATL; 23	KTY; 12	TX2; 9					15th	145	
2001	Bradley Motorsports	Dallara IR-01	12	Oldsmobile Aurora V8	PHX; 9	HMS; 16	ATL; 3	INDY; 12	TXS; 15	PPI; 15	RIR; 10	KAN; 13	NSH; 9	KTY; 16	STL; 22	CHI; 9	TX2; 10	9th	242	

Years	Teams	Races	Poles	Wins	Podiums (non-win)	Top 10s (non-podium)	Indianapolis 500 wins	Championships
6	1	53	0	1	2	18	0	1 (1996)

==== Indianapolis 500 ====
Year	Chassis	Engine	Start	Finish	Team
1996	Reynard 95i	Ford XB V8t	9	17	Bradley Motorsports
1997	G-Force GF01	Oldsmobile Aurora V8	16	11	Bradley Motorsports
1998	G-Force GF01B	Oldsmobile Aurora V8	18	10	Bradley Motorsports
1999	G-Force GF01C	Oldsmobile Aurora V8	26	19	Bradley Motorsports
2000	Dallara IR-00	Oldsmobile Aurora V8	22	18	Bradley Motorsports
2001	Dallara IR-01	Oldsmobile Aurora V8	24	12	Bradley Motorsports

Preceded by none	Indy Racing League Champion; 1996 (with Scott Sharp)	Succeeded by Tony Stewart
