= Russ Wicks =

American world record-holding racing driver (born 1966)

- Nationality: (United States) American
- Born: 1966 (age 59–60) Enumclaw, Washington, U.S.

Russ Wicks (born 1966) is an American racing driver. He is the only living person to hold world speed records over 200 mph, on both land and water. Wicks' racing career started with professional motocross.

== Speed records ==
On June 15, 2000, Wicks set the world water speed record for propeller-driven boats at 205 mph (330 km/h) in an unlimited hydroplane in Seattle's Lake Washington.

On July 3, 2006, Wicks set a stock car world speed record in a NASCAR-spec Ford Taurus of 222.623 mph (358,28 km/h), at the Bonneville Salt Flats in Utah.

On October 9, 2007, Wicks set a new stock car world speed record of 244.9 mph (394,13 km/h), at the Bonneville Salt Flats.
