= 1998 True Value 500 =

(United States) 1998 Texas I
Race details
- 4th round of the 1998 Indy Racing League season
- Date: June 6, 1998
- Official name: True Value 500
- Location: Texas Motor Speedway
- Course: Permanent racing facility 1.500 mi / 2.414 km
- Distance: 208 laps 312.000 mi / 502.115 km

Pole position
- Driver: (United States) Tony Stewart (Team Menard)
- Time: 24.059

Fastest lap
- Driver: (United States) Tony Stewart (Team Menard)
- Time: 22.972 (on lap 86 of 208)

Podium
- First: (United States) Billy Boat (A. J. Foyt Enterprises)
- Second: (United States) Greg Ray (Knapp Motorsports)
- Third: (Sweden) Kenny Bräck (A. J. Foyt Enterprises)

The 1998 True Value 500 was the fourth round of the 1998 Indy Racing League season. The race was held on June 6, 1998, at the 1.500 mi (2.414 km) Texas Motor Speedway in Fort Worth, Texas.

== Report ==
Key	Meaning
R	Rookie
W	Past winner

=== Qualifying ===
Two laps qualifying. The worst lap from any of the drivers were not published, and therefore are unknown. Rain delayed qualifying from Thursday to Friday.

Pos	No.	Name	Lap	Best (in mph)
1	1	(United States) Tony Stewart	24.059	224.448
2	11	(United States) Billy Boat	24.156	223.547
3	3	(United States) Robbie Buhl	24.204	223.104
4	5	(Netherlands) Arie Luyendyk W	24.416	221.166
5	16	(Brazil) Marco Greco	24.575	219.736
6	28	(United States) Mark Dismore	24.590	219.601
7	4	(Canada) Scott Goodyear	24.605	219.468
8	21	(Colombia) Roberto Guerrero	24.625	219.289
9	8	(United States) Scott Sharp	24.684	218.765
10	12	(United States) Buzz Calkins	24.713	218.508
11	14	(Sweden) Kenny Bräck	24.731	218.349
12	10	(United States) John Paul Jr.	24.735	218.314
13	35	(United States) Jeff Ward	24.823	217.540
14	97	(United States) Greg Ray	24.853	217.278
15	6	(United States) Davey Hamilton	24.886	216.989
16	77	(France) Stéphan Grégoire	24.929	216.615
17	98	(United States) Donnie Beechler R	24.944	216.485
18	15	(Chile) Eliseo Salazar	24.952	216.416
19	30	(Brazil) Raul Boesel	25.087	215.251
20	51	(United States) Eddie Cheever	25.118	214.985
21	40	(United States) Jack Miller	25.136	214.831
22	44	(United States) J. J. Yeley R	25.138	214.814
23	91	(United States) Buddy Lazier	25.181	214.447
24	99	(United States) Sam Schmidt	25.211	214.192
25	27	(United States) Billy Roe	25.222	214.099
26	19	(United States) Stan Wattles	25.325	213.228
27	52	(United States) Robby Unser R	25.363	212.909
28	81	(United States) Tyce Carlson	25.473	211.989

==== Failed to qualify or withdrew ====
- (United States) Johnny Unser for Hemelgarn Racing - subbed for (United States) Buddy Lazier, who suffered from a stomach illness, in practice sessions on Thursday and was named to qualify the car before it was delayed.
- (United States) Jimmy Kite for Team Scandia - The team scaled back its IRL program after Indianapolis to concentrate on NASCAR, and withdrew from the event, along with his #33 entry, initially assigned to (United States) Billy Roe.
- (United States) Mike Groff for Byrd-Cunningham Racing - fired prior to the start of practice and replaced by (United States) John Paul Jr., who was due to drive for Team Pelfrey.
- (United States) Steve Kinser R for Team Pelfrey - initially named as a replacement for Paul Jr, he withdrew prior to the start of practice. Replaced by (United States) Tyce Carlson, who was due to drive for Immke Racing.
- (United States) Jack Hewitt R for PDM Racing - did not arrive at the track.
- (United States) Paul Durant for Cobb Racing - did not arrive at the track.
- (United States) Joe Gosek R for Liberty Racing - did not arrive at the track.
- The #20 Immke Racing entry was withdrawn after Carlson signed with Team Pelfrey prior to the start of practice.
- The #17 Chitwood Motorsports entry, which was vacant on the entry list, did not arrive at the track.

=== Race ===
The race was the first IRL event run on the newly reconfigured Texas track, which had undergone changes to the corner banking (eliminating the 8-degree portions, originally intended for Indy events) and the transitions out of the corners, plus a complete repaving and drainage work. The new configuration proved to be extremely fast; Tony Stewart broke the IRL new car qualifying record, and ran laps as fast as 228 MPH during the race, believed to be the fastest laps ever turned on a closed course by a car with a normally aspirated engine.

The start was confusing, as Sam Schmidt did not come up to speed due to an electronics problem and Billy Roe spun through the quad-oval grass at the green flag. This was cleaned up, but only a few green flag laps were registered until Roberto Guerrero spun in front of the pack coming out of turn 2. Rookie Donnie Beechler ran hard into the back of Stéphan Grégoire's car, causing a six-car accident that eliminated Eddie Cheever (fresh off of his Indy 500 victory). Beechler ended sliding upside down the length of the back stretch. No one was hurt. Stewart had to pit for a cut tire after running through debris, handing the lead to Arie Luyendyk. The Dutch lead briefly after the green before being overhauled by Boat on lap 22, while Stewart worked his way up from the rear.

By lap 34, when a caution flew for Eliseo Salazar's blown engine, Luyendyk took a gamble by not pitting, but backfired when he had to pit under green on lap 59 and lost two laps. Mark Dismore had something in the rear of the car break on lap 72 which put him hard into the turn 1 wall, suffering a concussion. Under the subsequent caution, Stewart had to make an extra pit stop for a suspected tire problem and went to the rear again. On the restart, Scott Goodyear got the jump on Boat and took the lead; the two then battled until Boat retook the lead five laps later. By halfway, Boat, Stewart, and Greg Ray were running nose-to-tail and attempting slingshots.

As a caution flew on lap 144, Boat banged wheels with J. J. Yeley. The contact left a large "doughnut" on Boat's left sidepod, but he continued with no apparent problems. Stewart jumped Boat on the restart, while Ray, Goodyear, Jeff Ward and Kenny Bräck diced for third. Unfortunately for Ward, his race ended four laps later with engine failure. Stewart had his left sidepod radiator rupture streaked down the front stretch on lap 177, spewing water all over it. His crew tried to replace the faulty radiator in the pits but they ran out of time.

Boat then begin to stretch out his lead over Ray, but on lap 196 he got caught in traffic and Ray begin to close the gap. On lap 200, the Texas native caught Boat and then made a move through the grass in the quad-oval (reminiscent of Buddy Lazier at Charlotte the previous year); as they went down the back stretch Ray split the lapped car of Buzz Calkins and swept into the lead. But on the next lap, Boat used the slingshot to retake it; Ray tried for the next six laps but could not overcome Boat's superior engine, and Billy Boat took his first IRL win. For the top three (Boat, Ray, and Bräck), it was their best IRL career finishes up to that point. Scott Sharp ran a quiet race to finish fifth and move into a tie with Stewart in the points standings. One year after apparently winning at Texas, only to have the win taken away after a scoring recount, Billy Boat won it again, and this time he got to keep the trophy.

Pos	No.	Driver	Team	Laps	Time/Retired	Grid	Laps Led	Points
1	11	(United States) Billy Boat	A. J. Foyt Enterprises	208	2:08:45.543	2	108	54
2	97	(United States) Greg Ray	Knapp Motorsports	208	+ 0.928 sec	14	1	40
3	14	(Sweden) Kenny Bräck	A. J. Foyt Enterprises	208	Running	11	0	35
4	4	(Canada) Scott Goodyear	Panther Racing	208	Running	7	11	32
5	8	(United States) Scott Sharp	Kelley Racing	208	Running	9	0	30
6	3	(United States) Robbie Buhl	Team Menard	207	+ 1 lap	3	0	29
7	6	(United States) Davey Hamilton	Nienhouse Motorsports	207	+ 1 lap	15	0	26
8	16	(Brazil) Marco Greco	Phoenix Racing	205	+ 3 laps	5	0	24
9	52	(United States) Robby Unser R	Team Cheever	204	+ 4 laps	27	0	22
10	19	(United States) Stan Wattles	Metro Racing Systems	198	+ 10 laps	26	0	20
11	91	(United States) Buddy Lazier	Hemelgarn Racing	194	Wheel bearing	23	0	19
12	81	(United States) Tyce Carlson	Team Pelfrey	191	+ 17 laps	28	0	18
13	5	(Netherlands) Arie Luyendyk W	Treadway Racing	178	+ 30 laps	4	29	17
14	1	(United States) Tony Stewart	Team Menard	176	Radiator tank	1	57	19
15	12	(United States) Buzz Calkins	Bradley Motorsports	172	+ 36 laps	10	0	15
16	10	(United States) John Paul Jr.	Byrd-Cunningham Racing	169	+ 39 laps	12	0	14
17	35	(United States) Jeff Ward	ISM Racing	165	Engine	13	2	13
18	99	(United States) Sam Schmidt	LP Racing	163	+ 45 laps	24	0	12
19	44	(United States) J. J. Yeley R	Sinden Racing	162	+ 46 laps	22	0	11
20	27	(United States) Billy Roe	Blueprint Racing	108	+ 100 laps	25	0	10
21	28	(United States) Mark Dismore	Kelley Racing	70	Accident	6	0	9
22	40	(United States) Jack Miller	Crest Racing-SRS	38	Engine	21	0	8
23	15	(Chile) Eliseo Salazar	Riley & Scott Cars	32	Engine	18	0	7
24	21	(Colombia) Roberto Guerrero	Pagan Racing	4	Accident	8	0	6
25	77	(France) Stéphan Grégoire	Chastain Motorsports	4	Accident	16	0	5
26	51	(United States) Eddie Cheever	Team Cheever	4	Accident	20	0	4
27	98	(United States) Donnie Beechler R	Cahill Auto Racing	4	Accident	17	0	3
28	30	(Brazil) Raul Boesel	McCormack Motorsports	4	Accident	19	0	2

== Race Statistics ==
- Lead changes: 21 among 6 drivers

Lap Leaders
Laps	Leader
1-7	Tony Stewart
8-21	Arie Luyendyk
22-34	Billy Boat
35-49	Arie Luyendyk
50-72	Tony Stewart
73	Billy Boat
74	Tony Stewart
75-81	Billy Boat
82-86	Scott Goodyear
87-120	Billy Boat
121-122	Tony Stewart
123-124	Jeff Ward
125-140	Tony Stewart
141-147	Billy Boat
148-154	Tony Stewart
155-157	Billy Boat
158	Tony Stewart
159-167	Billy Boat
168-173	Scott Goodyear
174-200	Billy Boat
201	Greg Ray
202-208	Billy Boat

Cautions: 6 for 45 laps
Laps	Reason
1-3	Billy Roe spin
6-17	Guerrero, Grégoire, Cheever, Beechler and Boesel crash
34-44	Eliseo Salazar's blown engine; oil on track
72-81	Mark Dismore crash; tow-in for John Paul Jr.
144-148	Debris
177-180	Tony Stewart's radiator leaks water on track

== Standings after the race ==
Drivers' Championship standings

Pos	Driver	Points
1	(United States) Tony Stewart	115
2	(United States) Scott Sharp	115
3	(United States) Billy Boat	110
4	(United States) Jeff Ward	103
5	(United States) Davey Hamilton	97

- Note: Only the top five positions are included for the standings.
