= Regulation of sport =

Supervision and organization of sport activities

The regulation of sport is usually done by a sports governing body for each sport, resulting in a core of relatively invariant, agreed rules. People responsible for leisure activities often seek recognition and respectability as sports by joining sports federations such as the International Olympic Committee, or by forming their own regulatory body. In this way sports evolve from leisure activity to more formal sports: relatively recent newcomers are BMX cycling, snowboarding, wrestling, etc. Some of these activities have been popular but uncodified pursuits for different lengths of time. Indeed, the formal regulation of sport is a relatively modern and increasing development. This method promotes a sport globally, in a very successful way.

It also promotes the universality of each sport, by ensuring that the same gameplay rules are being practiced worldwide, using a standardized/homogenous international gameplay rule system (sanctioned by the respective international sports governing bodies) that is applied uniformly on all member associations and recognized leagues.

The degree of organisation can vary from national or worldwide competitions for the sport, or it can occur in a purely ad hoc, spontaneous way. A sport may be played individually (e.g. time trialling in cycling) or in a team, or just for recreation and well being (e.g. swimming).

Some challenging situations have had to be dealt with when there is an overlap of the regulation of the sport with other forms of regulation, e.g. safety (there have been serious losses of life in football audiences, through stand collapses or poor crowd management), or simple laws of the land (some inadvertent or otherwise physical interchanges occur between participants).

Examples are FIFA in association football and FIBA in basketball, which have regulated international gameplay rules that are even practiced within US sports leagues today, despite not practicing them historically (which therefore meant that many US sports leagues weren't recognized by international governing bodies in the past, until they began to adopt international rules). In the sport of basketball, the defender/defense cannot call foul.

== Formula One ==
Formula One motor racing is an example of strict and changing regulation, where the regulating body appears to control rather than to simply define the sport. There have been major changes in the rules of F1 recently, almost on an annual basis, and more are planned. Sometimes this is done for safety reasons, sometimes to make the racing more interesting as a spectator sport, and sometimes to promote competition through involvement of smaller teams. Some changes make overtaking more probable for example or reduce the probability of an overwhelming technical advantage by any one team. Although heavily regulated, most people agree that the sport has thereby greatly benefitted, not least through dramatic leaps in safety.

== Broadcasting ==
The broadcasting of sports events is also highly regulated, with contracts limiting who can show footage.

== See also ==
- Outline of sports
