= 1997 Las Vegas 500K =

(United States) 1997 Las Vegas
Race details
- 10th round of the 1996–1997 Indy Racing League season
- Date: October 11, 1997
- Official name: Las Vegas 500K
- Location: Las Vegas Motor Speedway
- Course: Permanent racing facility 1.500 mi / 2.414 km
- Distance: 208 laps 312.000 mi / 502.115 km
- Weather: Night race, dry with temperatures reaching up to 80.1 °F (26.7 °C); wind speeds reaching up to 34 miles per hour (55 km/h)

Pole position
- Driver: (United States) Billy Boat (A. J. Foyt Enterprises)
- Time: 26.035

Fastest lap
- Driver: (United States) Billy Boat (A. J. Foyt Enterprises)
- Time: 26.424 (on lap 19 of 208)

Podium
- First: (Chile) Eliseo Salazar (Team Scandia)
- Second: (Canada) Scott Goodyear (Treadway-Shelby Racing)
- Third: (United States) Robbie Buhl (Team Menard)

The 1997 Las Vegas 500K was the tenth and final round of the 1996–1997 Indy Racing League. The race was held on October 11, 1997, at the 1.500 mi (2.414 km) Las Vegas Motor Speedway in Las Vegas, Nevada.

== Qualifying Results ==
Key	Meaning
R	Rookie
W	Past winner

Pos	No.	Name	Lap 1	Lap 2	Best (in mph)
1	1	(United States) Billy Boat R	26.272	26.035	207.413
2	14	(United States) Davey Hamilton	26.373	26.303	205.300
3	2	(United States) Tony Stewart	26.327	26.363	205.113
4	3	(United States) Robbie Buhl	26.355	26.332	205.074
5	7	(Chile) Eliseo Salazar	26.391	26.429	204.615
6	5	(Netherlands) Arie Luyendyk	26.425	26.411	204.460
7	33	(United States) Jimmy Kite R	26.502	26.552	203.758
8	6	(Canada) Scott Goodyear	26.781	26.537	203.489
9	28	(United States) Mark Dismore	26.621	26.543	203.443
10	70	(Brazil) Marco Greco	26.572	26.715	203.221
11	17	(Brazil) Affonso Giaffone R	26.612	26.618	202.916
12	35	(United States) Jeff Ward R	26.643	26.820	202.680
13	4	(Sweden) Kenny Bräck R	26.775	26.655	202.589
14	91	(United States) Buddy Lazier	26.701	26.752	202.240
15	22	(Italy) Vincenzo Sospiri R	27.003	26.790	201.568
16	77	(France) Stéphan Grégoire	27.045	26.816	201.372
17	40	(United States) Jack Miller R	27.240	26.881	200.885
18	21	(Colombia) Roberto Guerrero	26.933	26.904	200.714
19	27	(United States) Jim Guthrie R	26.919	27.801	200.602
20	97	(United States) Greg Ray R	27.022	27.065	199.837
21	12	(United States) Buzz Calkins	27.382	27.200	198.529
22	99	(United States) Sam Schmidt R	27.602	27.241	198.231
23	95	(United States) Tyce Carlson R	27.320	27.273	197.998
24	18	(United States) John Paul Jr.	27.593	27.317	197.679
25	19	(United States) Stan Wattles R	27.714	27.336	197.542
26	24	(United States) Billy Roe R	27.575	27.418	196.951
27	30	(United States) Robbie Groff R	27.566	27.574	195.893
28	23	(United States) Mike Shank R	28.362	28.137	191.918
29	51	(United States) Eddie Cheever^{1}	Waved off		No speed
30	9	(United States) Johnny Unser^{2}	Didn't qualify		No speed
31	10	(United States) Paul Durant^{3} R	27.220	26.975	200.185

1. Had an engine failure in the last practice session, and tried to qualify in a last-minute effort, only to wave off his attempt. He was allowed to start the race at the back of the field.
2. Had an engine failure in the last practice session, and a spare was not ready on time. He was allowed to start the race at the back of the field.
3. Changed to a backup car for the race, following a crash in a practice session after qualifying.

== Race Report ==
The race began under cold and windy conditions that caused tire problems, which resulted in two accidents occurring immediately after pit stops. Greg Ray slid into the wall in turn-2 on lap 38, and about 25 laps later Sam Schmidt spun coming out of turn-2 and hit the wall. Buzz Calkins and Jack Miller both ran into debris from Schmidt's car, and all three were out.

Pole sitter Billy Boat did not stay up front very long; Jeff Ward quickly took charge until he began having engine problems and then Mark Dismore moved into the lead. Affonso Giaffone took the lead on lap 100, but during a pit stop on lap 116 a wheel was not tightened properly and it came off as Giaffone pulled back onto the track, damaging the suspension and undercarriage. Giaffone would finish, but well back.

Several drivers then dueled for the lead until Salazar took over; the veteran driver led most of the rest of the way and survived a two-lap sprint with Scott Goodyear after a late caution to win. The caution occurred when Roberto Guerrero touched wheels with a slower car and suffered a frightening accident; the car became airborne and then barrel-rolled through the infield grass on the backstretch. It was the first time an IRL car had been upside down during a live run, and the safety systems worked as planned: Guerrero walked away with minor injuries.

Both of the championship contenders, Stewart and Davey Hamilton, had problems; Stewart won the title owing to the points lead that he had coming in. This race marked the first competition for the new Riley & Scott chassis, with Stan Wattles taking one to an eighth-place finish. Eliseo Salazar took home his first (and only) IRL victory as Tony Stewart clinched the 1997 championship.

== Race results ==
=== Box Score ===
Pos	No.	Driver	Team	Laps	Time/Retired	Grid	Laps Led	Points
1	7	(Chile) Eliseo Salazar	Team Scandia	208	2:11:07.000	5	70	36
2	6	(Canada) Scott Goodyear	Treadway-Shelby Racing	208	+ 1.204 sec	8	5	33
3	3	(United States) Robbie Buhl	Team Menard	208	Running	4	12	32
4	27	(United States) Jim Guthrie R	Blueprint Racing	208	Running	19	9	31
5	28	(United States) Mark Dismore	Kelley Racing-PDM	208	Running	9	45	30
6	33	(United States) Jimmy Kite R	Team Scandia	208	Running	7	0	29
7	14	(United States) Davey Hamilton	A. J. Foyt Enterprises	207	+ 1 lap	2	1	28
8	19	(United States) Stan Wattles R	Metro Racing Systems	206	+ 2 laps	25	0	27
9	77	(France) Stéphan Grégoire	Chastain Motorsports	204	Gearbox	16	0	26
10	70	(Brazil) Marco Greco	Galles Racing	204	+ 4 laps	10	0	25
11	2	(United States) Tony Stewart	Team Menard	204	+ 4 laps	3	0	24
12	18	(United States) John Paul Jr.	PDM Racing	201	+ 7 laps	24	0	23
13	24	(United States) Billy Roe R	Roe Racing	198	+ 10 laps	26	0	22
14	21	(Colombia) Roberto Guerrero	Pagan Racing	197	Accident	18	0	21
15	17	(Brazil) Affonso Giaffone R	Chitwood Motorsports	193	+ 15 laps	11	16	20
16	23	(United States) Mike Shank R	Nienhouse Motorsports	191	+ 17 laps	28	0	19
17	35	(United States) Jeff Ward R	SRS-ISM Racing	168	Overheat	12	41	18
18	30	(United States) Robbie Groff R	McCormack Motorsports	168	+ 40 laps	27	0	17
19	9	(United States) Johnny Unser	Hemelgarn Racing	142	Engine	30	0	16
20	4	(Sweden) Kenny Bräck R	Galles Racing	139	Suspension	13	6	15
21	51	(United States) Eddie Cheever	Team Cheever	129	Engine	29	0	14
22	22	(Italy) Vincenzo Sospiri R	Team Scandia	114	Mechanical	15	0	13
23	1	(United States) Billy Boat R	A. J. Foyt Enterprises	97	Electrical	1	3	14
24	95	(United States) Tyce Carlson R	IZ Racing	96	Ignition	23	0	11
25	5	(Netherlands) Arie Luyendyk	Treadway-Shelby Racing	72	Engine	6	0	10
26	10	(United States) Paul Durant R	Byrd-Cunningham Racing	62	Mechanical	31	0	9
27	99	(United States) Sam Schmidt R	LP Racing-PCI	60	Accident	22	0	8
28	12	(United States) Buzz Calkins	Bradley Motorsports	60	Accident	21	0	7
29	40	(United States) Jack Miller R	Arizona Motorsports	59	Accident	17	0	6
30	97	(United States) Greg Ray R	Knapp Motorsports	35	Accident	20	0	5
31	91	(United States) Buddy Lazier	Hemelgarn Racing	4	Mechanical	14	0	4

=== Race Statistics ===
- Lead changes: 13 among 10 drivers

Lap Leaders
Laps	Leader
1-3	Billy Boat
4	Davey Hamilton
5-45	Jeff Ward
46-51	Robbie Buhl
52-94	Mark Dismore
95-99	Robbie Buhl
100-115	Affonso Giaffone
116-120	Scott Goodyear
121-122	Mark Dismore
123-131	Jim Guthrie
132-137	Kenny Bräck
138-158	Eliseo Salazar
159	Robbie Buhl
160-208	Eliseo Salazar

Cautions: 8 for 45 laps
Laps	Reason
1-3	Additional warm up laps because of windy, cold conditions
9-12	Tow-in for Buddy Lazier (gearbox issues)
38-43	Greg Ray crash
64-71	Schmidt, Miller and Calkins crash
118-125	Affonso Giaffone's wheel loose
131-135	Eddie Cheever's engine leaks oil on track
158-163	Tow-in for Johnny Unser (engine issue)
200-204	Roberto Guerrero crash, Backstretch

== Final IRL season standings after the race ==
Final Drivers' Championship standings

Pos	Driver	Points
1	(United States) Tony Stewart	278
2	(United States) Davey Hamilton	272
3	(Brazil) Marco Greco	230
4	(United States) Eddie Cheever	230
5	(Canada) Scott Goodyear	226

- Note: Only the top five positions are included for the standings.
