= 1997 VisionAire 500 =

(United States) 1997 Charlotte
Race details
- 8th round of the 1996–1997 Indy Racing League season
- Date: July 27, 1997
- Official name: VisionAire 500
- Location: Charlotte Motor Speedway
- Course: Permanent racing facility 1.500 mi / 2.414 km
- Distance: 208 laps 312.000 mi / 502.115 km
- Weather: Dry with temperatures reaching up to 90.5 °F (32.5 °C); wind speeds reaching up to 6 miles per hour (9.7 km/h)

Pole position
- Driver: (United States) Tony Stewart (Team Menard)
- Time: 24.866

Fastest lap
- Driver: (United States) Billy Boat (A. J. Foyt Enterprises)
- Time: 25.292 (on lap 9 of 208)

Podium
- First: (United States) Buddy Lazier (Hemelgarn Racing)
- Second: (United States) Billy Boat (A. J. Foyt Enterprises)
- Third: (Canada) Scott Goodyear (Treadway Racing)

The 1997 VisionAire 500 was the eighth round of the 1996–1997 Indy Racing League. The race was held on July 26, 1997, at the 1.500 mi (2.414 km) Charlotte Motor Speedway in Concord, North Carolina, US. The event was the first Indy Racing League event to be held at Charlotte.

== Qualifying Results ==
Key	Meaning
R	Rookie
W	Past winner

Pos	No.	Name	Lap 1	Lap 2	Best (in mph)
1	2	(United States) Tony Stewart	24.986	24.866	217.164
2	5	(Netherlands) Arie Luyendyk	25.245	25.172	214.524
3	1	(United States) Billy Boat R	25.543	25.419	212.440
4	14	(United States) Davey Hamilton	25.454	25.424	212.398
5	91	(United States) Buddy Lazier	25.478	25.514	211.948
6	27	(United States) Jim Guthrie R	25.782	25.661	210.436
7	21	(Colombia) Roberto Guerrero	25.736	25.688	210.215
8	6	(Canada) Scott Goodyear	26.065	25.787	209.408
9	77	(France) Stéphan Grégoire	25.967	25.799	209.310
10	28	(United States) Mark Dismore	25.827	25.808	209.237
11	70	(Brazil) Marco Greco	25.823	25.861	209.116
12	22	(Italy) Vincenzo Sospiri R	26.236	25.833	209.035
13	33	(United States) Jimmy Kite R	25.865	25.891	208.776
14	7	(Chile) Eliseo Salazar	25.891	25.961	208.567
15	51	(United States) Eddie Cheever	25.929	25.911	208.406
16	17	(Brazil) Affonso Giaffone R	26.045	26.074	207.333
17	31	(United States) Greg Ray R	26.120	26.054	207.262
18	4	(Sweden) Kenny Bräck R	26.089	26.062	207.198
19	40	(United States) Jack Miller R	26.413	26.193	206.162
20	30	(United States) Robbie Groff R	26.328	26.333	205.066
21	18	(United States) John Paul Jr.	26.883	26.577	203.183
22	10	(United States) Mike Groff	27.548	27.187	198.624
23	99	(United States) Sam Schmidt^{1} R	Did not qualify		No speed

1. Failed to qualify after breaking a cam sensor in practice, but was allowed to start the race at the back of the field.

=== Failed to qualify or withdrew ===
- (United States) Buzz Calkins for Bradley Motorsports - suffered a concussion during testing on July 8 at New Hampshire and was unable to compete.
- (United States) Robbie Buhl for Team Menard - entered for the race, but was still recovering from a concussion suffered during testing on June 4.
- (United States) Jeff Ward R for Team Cheever - withdrew prior to the start of practice.

== Race Report ==
Buddy Lazier beat rookie Billy Boat to take his second IRL victory in the first-ever Indy car race at this long-time stock-car racing venue. The race was dominated by Tony Stewart at the beginning, but his car developed handling problems after pitting during a caution period on lap 75 and was out of contention thereafter. Lazier stayed out during the caution and assumed the lead, but had to make a green-flag stop on lap 93 and fell a lap down.

Mark Dismore moved up steadily through the field but blew an engine at full speed going down the front stretch on lap 99; he spun the car harmlessly into the infield in turn 1. Boat, Roberto Guerrero and Jimmy Kite (in only his second IRL start) swapped the lead until Guerrero touched wheels with points leader Davey Hamilton in turn 2 and both cars spun into the wall. Neither driver was hurt, but his resulting 16th-place finish cost Hamilton the points lead. Lazier unlapped himself on the subsequent caution and joined the duel with Boat and Kite; the latter's race ended when his car pushed up into the wall exiting turn 4.

After the caution, Lazier took the lead and tried to pull away from Boat, but got caught behind Scott Goodyear who was trying to stay on the lead lap. While Lazier made several high-risk pass attempts (including two runs through the grass in the quad-oval), Boat caught him and briefly assumed the lead, but then Goodyear conceded and Lazier moved back in front for the final 11 laps. In the last few laps, Kenny Bräck and Eddie Cheever staged a furious duel for fifth as they picked through traffic, with Bräck coming out on top.

== Race results ==
=== Box Score ===
Key	Meaning
R	Rookie
W	Past winner

Pos	No.	Driver	Team	Laps	Time/Retired	Grid	Laps Led	Points
1	91	(United States) Buddy Lazier	Hemelgarn Racing	208	1:55:29.224	5	58	35
2	1	(United States) Billy Boat R	A. J. Foyt Enterprises	208	+ 3.301 sec	3	38	33
3	6	(Canada) Scott Goodyear	Treadway Racing	207	+ 1 lap	8	1	32
4	17	(Brazil) Affonso Giaffone R	Chitwood Motorsports	206	+ 2 laps	16	0	31
5	4	(Sweden) Kenny Bräck R	Galles Racing	206	+ 2 laps	18	0	30
6	51	(United States) Eddie Cheever	Team Cheever	206	+ 2 laps	15	0	29
7	2	(United States) Tony Stewart	Team Menard	205	+ 3 laps	1	74	31
8	77	(France) Stéphan Grégoire	Chastain Motorsports	202	+ 6 laps	9	0	27
9	70	(Brazil) Marco Greco	Galles Racing	202	+ 6 laps	11	0	26
10	7	(Chile) Eliseo Salazar	Team Scandia	200	+ 8 laps	14	0	25
11	18	(United States) John Paul Jr.	PDM Racing	198	+ 10 laps	21	0	24
12	27	(United States) Jim Guthrie R	Blueprint Racing	197	+ 11 laps	6	0	23
13	30	(United States) Robbie Groff R	McCormack Motorsports	189	Half shaft	20	0	22
14	10	(United States) Mike Groff	Byrd-Cunningham Racing	176	+ 32 laps	22	0	21
15	33	(United States) Jimmy Kite R	Team Scandia	163	Accident	13	11	20
16	14	(United States) Davey Hamilton	A. J. Foyt Enterprises	141	Accident	4	0	19
17	21	(Colombia) Roberto Guerrero	Pagan Racing	141	Accident	7	26	18
18	99	(United States) Sam Schmidt R	LP Racing-PCI	114	Engine	23	0	17
19	28	(United States) Mark Dismore	Kelley Racing-PDM	97	Engine	10	0	16
20	22	(Italy) Vincenzo Sospiri R	Team Scandia	70	Engine	12	0	15
21	5	(Netherlands) Arie Luyendyk	Treadway Racing	67	Handling	2	0	14
22	31	(United States) Greg Ray R	Knapp Motorsports	30	Engine	17	0	13
23	40	(United States) Jack Miller R	Arizona Motorsports	13	Electrical	19	0	13

=== Race Statistics ===
- Lead changes: 13 among 6 drivers

Lap Leaders
Laps	Leader
1-47	Tony Stewart
48	Scott Goodyear
49-75	Tony Stewart
76-92	Buddy Lazier
93-100	Billy Boat
101-126	Roberto Guerrero
127-139	Billy Boat
140-145	Jimmy Kite
146	Billy Boat
147-151	Jimmy Kite
152-166	Billy Boat
167-195	Buddy Lazier
196	Billy Boat
197-208	Buddy Lazier

Cautions: 4 for 27 laps
Laps	Reason
74-76	Debris
99-106	Mark Dismore's engine leaks oil on track
145-154	Guerrero, Hamilton and Salazar crash
165-170	Jimmy Kite crash

== Standings after the race ==
Drivers' Championship standings

Pos	Driver	Points
1	(United States) Tony Stewart	233
2	(United States) Davey Hamilton	226
3	(United States) Eddie Cheever	189
4	(Brazil) Marco Greco	188
5	(United States) Buzz Calkins	183

- Note: Only the top five positions are included for the standings.

== Broadcasting ==
=== Television ===
Although the event was run on July 26, the race was not broadcast live. Instead, CBS carried it on a one-day tape delay as part of its sports anthology series, which was known at the time as The CBS Sports Show.

Mike Joy was the lap-by-lap commentator. Scott Sharp, who at the time was nursing injuries that were preventing him from driving, was the driver analyst in the booth. Brian Hammons and Mike King reported from the pits.
