= 2001 zMax 500 =

Indycar race held in Hampton, Georgia

(United States) 2001 zMax 500
Race details
3rd round of the 2001 Indy Racing League season
← Previous race	Next race →
- Date: April 28, 2001
- Official name: zMax 500
- Location: Atlanta Motor Speedway, Hampton, Georgia
- Course: Permanent racing facility 1.54 mi / 2.478 km
- Distance: 200 laps 308 mi / 495.678 km

Pole position
- Driver: (United States) Greg Ray (Team Menard)
- Time: 24.741

Fastest lap
- Driver: (United States) Greg Ray (Team Menard)
- Time: 25.0331 (on lap 155 of 200)

Podium
- First: (United States) Greg Ray (Team Menard)
- Second: (United States) Scott Sharp (Kelley Racing)
- Third: (United States) Buzz Calkins (Bradley Motorsports)

Chronology
Previous	Next
2000	—

The 2001 zMax 500 was the 3rd round of the 2001 Indy Racing League season. The race was held on April 28, 2001, at Atlanta Motor Speedway in Hampton, Georgia. The race took the scheduled 200 laps to complete. Greg Ray won the race. Scott Sharp finished 2nd, and Buzz Calkins finished 3rd. Sam Hornish Jr. and Eliseo Salazar rounded out the top five, and Buddy Lazier, Jeff Ward, Shigeaki Hattori, Airton Daré, and Felipe Giaffone rounded out the top ten.

This race is notable for a crash that occurred on lap 53 which involved eleven drivers. Jack Miller, who was among the eleven drivers involved, suffered injuries that led him to retire from Indy Racing League Competition. This race also marked Greg Ray's final win in the Indy Racing League, and the final time that the Indy Racing League ever raced at Atlanta.

Cory Witherill, who made his IRL debut in this race and finished 22nd, became the first Native American driver to race in the Indy Racing League.

== Entry list ==
Key	Meaning
R	Rookie
W	Past winner

No.	Driver	Team	Chassis	Engine
2	(United States) Greg Ray W	Team Menard	Dallara	Chevrolet
3	(United States) Al Unser Jr.	Galles Racing	G-Force	Oldsmobile
4	(United States) Sam Hornish Jr.	Panther Racing	Dallara	Oldsmobile
6	(United States) Jon Herb R	Tri-Star Motorsports	Dallara	Oldsmobile
7	(France) Stéphan Grégoire	Dick Simon Racing	Dallara	Oldsmobile
8	(United States) Scott Sharp W	Kelley Racing	Dallara	Oldsmobile
9	(United States) Jeret Schroeder	PDM Racing	G-Force	Oldsmobile
10	(United States) Robby McGehee	Cahill Racing	Dallara	Oldsmobile
11	(United States) Jack Miller	Cahill Racing	Dallara	Oldsmobile
12	(United States) Buzz Calkins	Bradley Motorsports	Dallara	Oldsmobile
14	(Chile) Eliseo Salazar	A. J. Foyt Enterprises	Dallara	Oldsmobile
15	(United States) Sarah Fisher	Walker Racing	Dallara	Oldsmobile
16	(United States) Cory Witherill R	Indy Regenecy Racing	G-Force	Oldsmobile
21	(Brazil) Felipe Giaffone R	Treadway-Hubbard Racing	G-Force	Oldsmobile
24	(United States) Robbie Buhl	Dreyer & Reinbold Racing	G-Force	Infiniti
28	(United States) Mark Dismore	Kelley Racing	Dallara	Oldsmobile
30	(United States) Brandon Erwin	McCormack Motorsports	G-Force	Oldsmobile
31	(United States) Casey Mears R	Galles Racing	G-Force	Oldsmobile
32	(France) Didier André R	Galles Racing	G-Force	Oldsmobile
35	(United States) Jeff Ward	Heritage Motorsports	G-Force	Oldsmobile
51	(United States) Eddie Cheever	Team Cheever	Dallara	Infiniti
55	(Japan) Shigeaki Hattori	Vertex-Cunningham Racing	Dallara	Oldsmobile
88	(Brazil) Airton Daré	Team Xtreme	G-Force	Oldsmobile
91	(United States) Buddy Lazier	Hemelgarn Racing	Dallara	Oldsmobile
92	(United States) Stan Wattles	Hemelgarn Racing	Dallara	Oldsmobile
98	(United States) Billy Boat	Curb-Agajanian-Beck Motorsports	Dallara	Oldsmobile
99	(United States) Davey Hamilton	Sam Schmidt Motorsports	Dallara	Oldsmobile

== Qualifying ==
Qualifying was held on April 27, 2001. Greg Ray won the pole, the eleventh of his career.

=== Qualifying classification ===
Pos	No.	Driver	Team	Chassis	Engine	Time	Final grid								
Pos	No.	Driver	Team	Chassis	Engine	Time	Final grid	1	2	(United States) Greg Ray W	Team Menard	Dallara	Chevrolet	24.741	1
2	35	(United States) Jeff Ward	Heritage Motorsports	G-Force	Oldsmobile	24.983	2								
3	51	(United States) Eddie Cheever	Team Cheever	Dallara	Infiniti	25.026	3								
4	28	(United States) Mark Dismore	Kelley Racing	Dallara	Oldsmobile	25.109	4								
5	55	(Japan) Shigeaki Hattori	Vertex-Cunningham Racing	Dallara	Oldsmobile	25.249	5								
6	4	(United States) Sam Hornish Jr.	Panther Racing	Dallara	Oldsmobile	25.281	6								
7	14	(Chile) Eliseo Salazar	A. J. Foyt Enterprises	Dallara	Oldsmobile	25.308	7								
8	12	(United States) Buzz Calkins	Bradley Motorsports	Dallara	Oldsmobile	25.312	8								
9	91	(United States) Buddy Lazier	Hemelgarn Racing	Dallara	Oldsmobile	25.315	9								
10	10	(United States) Robby McGehee	Cahill Racing	Dallara	Oldsmobile	25.411	10								
11	88	(Brazil) Airton Daré	Team Xtreme	G-Force	Oldsmobile	25.412	11								
12	99	(United States) Davey Hamilton	Sam Schmidt Motorsports	Dallara	Oldsmobile	25.414	12								
13	8	(United States) Scott Sharp W	Kelley Racing	Dallara	Oldsmobile	25.422	13								
14	3	(United States) Al Unser Jr.	Galles Racing	G-Force	Oldsmobile	25.459	14								
15	21	(Brazil) Felipe Giaffone R	Treadway-Hubbard Racing	G-Force	Oldsmobile	25.466	15								
16	92	(United States) Stan Wattles	Hemelgarn Racing	Dallara	Oldsmobile	25.466	16								
17	98	(United States) Billy Boat	Curb-Agajanian-Beck Motorsports	Dallara	Oldsmobile	25.468	17								
18	15	(United States) Sarah Fisher	Walker Racing	Dallara	Oldsmobile	25.478	18								
19	24	(United States) Robbie Buhl	Dreyer & Reinbold Racing	G-Force	Infiniti	25.526	19								
20	32	(France) Didier André R	Galles Racing	G-Force	Oldsmobile	25.643	20								
21	7	(France) Stéphan Grégoire	Dick Simon Racing	Dallara	Oldsmobile	25.704	21								
22	9	(United States) Jeret Schroeder	PDM Racing	G-Force	Oldsmobile	25.789	22								
23	11	(United States) Jack Miller	Cahill Racing	Dallara	Oldsmobile	25.790	23								
24	16	(United States) Cory Witherill R	Indy Regenecy Racing	G-Force	Oldsmobile	25.793	24								
25	6	(United States) Jon Herb R	Tri-Star Motorsports	Dallara	Oldsmobile	25.799	25								
26	30	(United States) Brandon Erwin	McCormack Motorsports	G-Force	Oldsmobile	26.066	26								
27	31	(United States) Casey Mears R	Galles Racing	G-Force	Oldsmobile	26.094	27								

== Race ==
An estimated 40,000 fans attended the race. The grand marshal was Regina Kauffman, a U.S. Navy lieutenant. The race was held back thirty minutes due to rain showers prior to the race.

As the race began, Jeff Ward took the lead from pole sitter Greg Ray and led the first two laps before Ray took back the lead. On lap 5, the first caution came out after Brandon Erwin crashed in turn 3. After the caution, Ray grew a sizable lead over the rest of the field. Mark Dismore and Eddie Cheever, both of whom qualified inside the top 5, retired early due to engine issues. The second caution came out on lap 46 after oil was reported in turn 2. The race went back to green on lap 51, with Sam Hornish Jr. in hot pursuit of Greg Ray.

On lap 53, Cory Witherill's car slowed in turn 4 due to an engine problem. Al Unser Jr., who slammed the brakes to avoid Witherill, was hit from behind, which sparked a fiery eleven-car pileup. While most drivers suffered minor, if any, injuries, Jack Miller suffered a concussion and was taken to Atlanta Medical Center for further evaluation. He later withdrew his entry in the Indianapolis 500 and retired from racing in IRL. The remaining drivers drove under caution for 22 laps as track workers cleaned up the debris. After pit stops finally began, Buddy Lazier's left-front tire was not properly secured, causing it to come off of Lazier's car. As it happened, Lazier is heard on the radio, bluntly saying: "Oh, shit."

During the caution, Ray lost the lead to Jeff Ward again, though Ray quickly passed him on the restart. The fourth and final caution came out on lap 91, as Jon Herb's car lost power in turn 2. Under the caution, Jeff Ward went to pit road for a battery issue. He returned to the track 1 lap down, a lap that he never regained.

After the caution, Greg Ray would continue dominating. He briefly gave up the lead to Scott Sharp on lap 147 during green-flag pit stops, though he regained the lead five laps later. As the race wound down, Sam Hornish Jr. was again in hot pursuit of Greg Ray. However, Hornish's chances of winning were thwarted when he was forced to pit for a splash of fuel with 10 laps to go. Greg Ray, who slowed down over 20 mph in the closing laps, managed to stretch his fuel and earn his 5th Indy Racing League win, tying him with Scott Sharp for the most wins in the series.

=== Race classification ===
Pos	No.	Driver	Team	Chassis	Engine	Laps	Time/Retired	Grid	Laps Led	Pts.
1	2	(United States) Greg Ray W	Team Menard	Dallara	Chevrolet	200	2:14:40.989	1	184	52
2	8	(United States) Scott Sharp W	Kelley Racing	Dallara	Oldsmobile	200	+19.857	13	5	40
3	12	(United States) Buzz Calkins	Bradley Motorsports	Dallara	Oldsmobile	200	+24.890	8	0	35
4	4	(United States) Sam Hornish Jr.	Panther Racing	Dallara	Oldsmobile	199	+1 Lap	6	1	32
5	14	(Chile) Eliseo Salazar	A. J. Foyt Enterprises	Dallara	Oldsmobile	199	+1 Lap	7	0	30
6	91	(United States) Buddy Lazier	Hemelgarn Racing	Dallara	Oldsmobile	199	+1 Lap	9	0	28
7	35	(United States) Jeff Ward	Heritage Motorsports	G-Force	Oldsmobile	199	+1 Lap	2	10	26
8	55	(Japan) Shigeaki Hattori	Vertex-Cunningham Racing	Dallara	Oldsmobile	198	+2 Laps	5	0	24
9	88	(Brazil) Airton Daré	Team Xtreme	G-Force	Oldsmobile	197	+3 Laps	11	0	22
10	21	(Brazil) Felipe Giaffone R	Treadway-Hubbard Racing	G-Force	Oldsmobile	182	+18 Laps	15	0	20
11	15	(United States) Sarah Fisher	Walker Racing	Dallara	Oldsmobile	178	+22 Laps	18	0	19
12	92	(United States) Stan Wattles	Hemelgarn Racing	Dallara	Oldsmobile	147	+53 Laps	16	0	18
13	32	(France) Didier André R	Galles Racing	G-Force	Oldsmobile	139	Clutch	20	0	17
14	98	(United States) Billy Boat	Curb-Agajanian-Beck Motorsports	Dallara	Oldsmobile	109	+91 Laps	17	0	16
15	7	(France) Stéphan Grégoire	Dick Simon Racing	Dallara	Oldsmobile	95	Mechanical	21	0	15
16	6	(United States) Jon Herb R	Tri-Star Motorsports	Dallara	Oldsmobile	77	Engine	25	0	14
17	3	(United States) Al Unser Jr.	Galles Racing	G-Force	Oldsmobile	52	Crash	14	0	13
18	99	(United States) Davey Hamilton	Sam Schmidt Motorsports	Dallara	Oldsmobile	52	Crash	12	0	12
19	9	(United States) Jeret Schroeder	PDM Racing	G-Force	Oldsmobile	52	Crash	22	0	11
20	24	(United States) Robbie Buhl	Dreyer & Reinbold Racing	G-Force	Infiniti	52	Crash	19	0	10
21	10	(United States) Robby McGehee	Cahill Racing	Dallara	Oldsmobile	52	Crash	10	0	9
22	16	(United States) Cory Witherill R	Indy Regenecy Racing	G-Force	Oldsmobile	51	Crash	24	0	8
23	31	(United States) Casey Mears R	Galles Racing	G-Force	Oldsmobile	51	Crash	27	0	7
24	51	(United States) Eddie Cheever	Team Cheever	Dallara	Infiniti	34	Engine	3	0	6
25	11	(United States) Jack Miller	Cahill Racing	Dallara	Oldsmobile	28	Crash	23	0	5
26	28	(United States) Mark Dismore	Kelley Racing	Dallara	Oldsmobile	15	Engine	4	0	4
27	30	(United States) Brandon Erwin	McCormack Motorsports	G-Force	Oldsmobile	3	Crash	26	0	3
Fastest lap: (United States) Greg Ward (Team Menard) – 25.0331 (lap 155)

== Championship standings after the race ==
Drivers' Championship standings

	Pos.	Driver	Points
Unchanged	1	(United States) Sam Hornish Jr.	136
	2	(Chile) Eliseo Salazar	105 (–31)
1	3	(United States) Scott Sharp	96 (–40)
1	4	(United States) Jeff Ward	82 (–54)
2	5	(Brazil) Felipe Giaffone	80 (–56)

Previous race: 2001 Infiniti Grand Prix of Miami	Indy Racing Northern Light Series; 2001 season	Next race: 2001 Indianapolis 500
Previous race: 2000 Midas 500 Classic	zMax 500	Next race: —
