= 2001 Pennzoil Copper World Indy 200 =

IndyCar race held in Avondale, Arizona

(United States) 2001 Pennzoil Copper World Indy 200
Race details
Race 1 of 13 in the 2001 Indy Racing Northern Light Series season
← Previous race	Next race →
- Date: March 18, 2001
- Official name: Pennzoil Copper World Indy 200
- Location: Phoenix International Raceway, Avondale, Arizona
- Course: Permanent racing facility 1.000 mi / 1.609 km
- Distance: 200 laps 200.000 mi / 321.869 km

Pole position
- Driver: (United States) Greg Ray (Team Menard)
- Time: 20.2631

Fastest lap
- Driver: (United States) Billy Boat (Curb-Agajanian-Beck Motorsports)
- Time: 21.3309 (on lap 93 of 200)

Podium
- First: (United States) Sam Hornish Jr. (Panther Racing)
- Second: (Chile) Eliseo Salazar (A. J. Foyt Racing)
- Third: (United States) Buddy Lazier (Hemelgarn Racing)

The 2001 Pennzoil Copper World Indy 200 was an Indy Racing Northern Light Series motor race held on March 18, 2001, in Avondale, Arizona at Phoenix International Raceway. It was the first round of the 2001 Indy Racing Northern Light Series. Panther Racing driver Sam Hornish Jr. won the 200-lap race. Eliseo Salazar of A. J. Foyt Racing finished second and Buddy Lazier finished third for Hemelgarn Racing.

Greg Ray won the pole position by posting the fastest lap of qualifying. Second-place qualifier Hornish Jr. quickly passed him and held the first position until Ray reclaimed the lead on lap 68. Ray made a pit stop on lap 74 and relinquished the lead to Gil de Ferran, who crashed while entering pit road three laps later. After Hélio Castroneves and Scott Sharp made their stops, Ray took the lead once again. By lap 119, Ray began experiencing engine issues, allowing Stéphan Grégoire to take the lead. Hornish Jr. moved into the first position by virtue of a quick pit stop, and after Grégoire crashed on lap 132, he led the remaining laps to earn the victory. There were five cautions and seven lead changes among six drivers during the race.

The victory was Hornish Jr.'s first of his career, and he became the youngest winner in Indy Racing Northern Light Series history (a record which was broken in 2006). After the race, Hornish Jr. held a twelve-point lead in the Drivers' Championship over Salazar. Oldsmobile also had the Manufacturers' Championship by four points over Nissan.

== Background ==
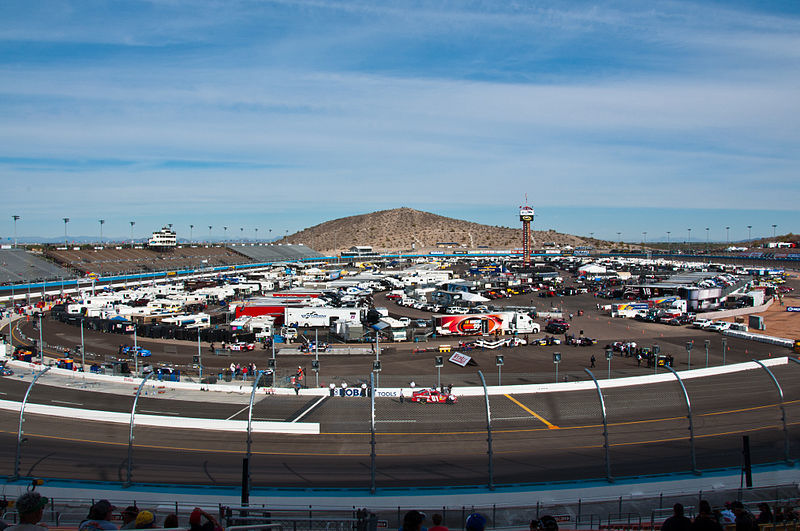
Phoenix International Raceway (pictured in 2011), where the race was held.

The Pennzoil Copper World Indy 200 was the first of 13 scheduled open-wheel races for the 2001 Indy Racing Northern Light Series. It was held on March 18, 2001, in Avondale, Arizona, United States, at Phoenix International Raceway, a four-turn 1 mi (1.6 km) paved oval track with 11-degree banking in the first two turns and 9-degree banking in the last two turns, marking the fifty-sixth American open-wheel car race at the track dating back to 1964, and contested over 200 laps and 200 miles (320 km).

To prepare for the race, the Indy Racing League (IRL) conducted a test, named the "Test of the West," for the series' entrants at Phoenix International Raceway on February 9–10. Both sessions began at 9:00 AM Mountain Standard Time (MST) and concluded at 5:00 PM. Stéphan Grégoire was fastest of the 12 drivers who took part in the incident-free session on February 9 with a top speed of 176.808 mph (284.545 km/h). Fourteen drivers participated in the session on February 10, which also went without any accidents and was led by Greg Ray with a top speed of 174.906 mph (281.484 km/h).

Twenty-seven cars were entered for the race, represented by two different chassis manufacturers and two different engine manufacturers. Among those who partook in the race were Team Penske drivers Gil de Ferran and Hélio Castroneves, both of whom were regulars in the rivaling CART FedEx Championship Series and used the race as a warm-up for the forthcoming Indianapolis 500. Buddy Lazier, who entered the season as the defending champion of the race and the series, aimed to win the season-opener by focusing on his late-race performance. With two rookie drivers—Casey Mears and Didier André—joining Al Unser Jr. at Galles Racing, Unser Jr. predicted that the season would be "unbelievable" for him and his team. Despite Sam Hornish Jr.'s poor finishes at the circuit, he hoped to win in his first race with Panther Racing. Eddie Cheever believed his new Infiniti Indy 35A engine would bring him success in the season so long as it "progressed" well throughout the races.

== Practice and qualifying ==
Three practice sessions preceded the race on Sunday, two on Friday and one on Saturday. The first and third sessions lasted 90 minutes and the second lasted 60 minutes. For each session, the race's entrants were split into two groups who received equal track time. Hornish Jr. led the first practice session on Friday morning with a time of 20.7551 seconds, besting Eliseo Salazar, Stan Wattles, Ray, and Sarah Fisher. Mark Dismore and Cheever both suffered mechanical issues, while debris came off of André's car. Later that day, Wattles was fastest in the second practice session with a time of 20.9074 seconds, ahead of Cheever, Lazier, Billy Boat, and Salazar. Ray lapped the quickest time of the third practice session on Saturday morning at 20.3917 seconds, with de Ferran, Lazier, Grégoire, and Hornish Jr. rounding out the top-five. Hornish Jr. caused a five-minute stoppage in the session after spinning on the blend line in turn two, although he did not receive any damage.

"Team Menard loves to start first. This is a good group of guys working hard. New team, new manager, new engineer, a lot of new mechanics. It's a whole new group of guys. We have a great chemistry. Everybody is working together. I really need to focus on having a lot better races this year. I really make it no secret that I enjoy qualifying. I love that single speed event. But it does nothing for the championship."

— Greg Ray, following the qualifying session.

Qualifying began on Saturday under sunny conditions. Each driver was required to complete two timed laps, with the fastest of the two laps determining their starting position. Ray earned the tenth pole position of his career, and his third consecutive at Phoenix, with a time of 20.2631 seconds and was joined on the grid's front row by Hornish Jr., who was nearly one tenth of a second slower. Jeff Ward qualified third in his first race with the new Heritage Motorsports team and Grégoire occupied fourth place, the best qualifying effort of his career. Positions fifth through tenth were occupied by de Ferran, Lazier, Boat, Robbie Buhl, Felipe Giaffone, and Scott Sharp. Buzz Calkins experienced oversteer during his qualifying run and was the fastest driver not to qualify inside the top ten. Heavy winds during the qualifying session prevented Cheever from qualifying higher than 12th, while Salazar and Wattles, starting from 13th and 14th, used too much downforce for their liking. Mark Dismore qualified 15th after lifting off the accelerator pedal in turns three and four, with Robby McGehee in 16th and Castroneves in 17th. The final ten starting positions were claimed by Airton Daré, Tyce Carlson, Davey Hamilton, Sarah Fisher, Jeret Schroeder, Unser Jr., Shigeaki Hattori, Mears, Brandon Erwin, and André. Boat, McGehee, and Fisher were each limited to one timed lap due to failing pre-qualifying technical inspection.

=== Qualifying classification ===
Pos	No.	Driver	Team	Time	Speed	Grid
1	2	(United States) Greg Ray	Team Menard	20.2631	177.663	1
2	4	(United States) Sam Hornish Jr.	Panther Racing	20.3619	176.801	2
3	35	(United States) Jeff Ward	Heritage Motorsports	20.4883	175.710	3
4	7	(France) Stéphan Grégoire	Dick Simon Racing	20.6372	174.442	4
5	66	(Brazil) Gil de Ferran	Team Penske	20.6897	174.000	5
6	91	(United States) Buddy Lazier	Hemelgarn Racing	20.6966	173.942	6
7	98	(United States) Billy Boat	Curb-Agajanian-Beck Motorsports	20.7898	173.162	7
8	24	(United States) Robbie Buhl	Dreyer & Reinbold Racing	20.7955	173.114	8
9	21	(Brazil) Felipe Giaffone	Treadway-Hubbard Racing	20.8034	173.049	9
10	8	(United States) Scott Sharp	Kelley Racing	20.8097	172.996	10
11	12	(United States) Buzz Calkins	Bradley Motorsports	20.8352	172.785	11
12	51	(United States) Eddie Cheever	Cheever Indy Racing	20.8501	172.661	12
13	14	(Chile) Eliseo Salazar	A. J. Foyt Racing	20.8547	172.623	13
14	92	(United States) Stan Wattles	Hemelgarn Racing	20.8560	172.612	14
15	28	(United States) Mark Dismore	Kelley Racing	20.8666	172.525	15
16	10	(United States) Robby McGehee	Cahill Racing	20.9064	172.196	16
17	68	(Brazil) Hélio Castroneves	Team Penske	20.9285	172.014	17
18	88	(Brazil) Airton Daré	Team Xtreme Racing	21.2188	169.661	18
19	6	(United States) Tyce Carlson	TriStar Motorsports	21.2304	169.568	19
20	99	(United States) Davey Hamilton	Sam Schmidt Motorsports	21.2618	169.318	20
21	15	(United States) Sarah Fisher	Walker Racing	21.3209	168.848	21
22	9	(United States) Jeret Schroeder	PDM Racing	21.3531	168.594	22
23	3	(United States) Al Unser Jr.	Galles Racing	21.6883	165.988	23
24	55	(Japan) Shigeaki Hattori	Vertex-Cunningham Racing	21.7637	165.413	24
25	31	(United States) Casey Mears	Galles Racing	21.8585	164.696	25
26	30	(United States) Brandon Erwin	McCormack Motorsports	22.3791	160.864	26
27	32	(France) Didier André	Galles Racing	22.8211	157.749	27

== Warm-up ==
The drivers took to the track on Sunday at 10:00 AM MST for a thirty-minute warm-up session. Lazier posted the fastest lap of the session at 170.891 mph (275.022 km/h), beating Grégoire, Sharp, Hornish Jr., and Salazar. Wattles spun in the first turn eleven minutes into the session but did not receive any damage.

== Race ==
Live television coverage of the race began at 2:00 PM MST on ABC in the United States. Commentary was provided by Bob Jenkins, Larry Rice, and Jason Priestley. Around the start of the race, weather conditions were sunny, with air temperatures at 77 °F (25 °C) and track temperatures at 117 °F (47 °C). Mark Wingler of the IRL Ministry began prerace ceremonies with an invocation. The national anthem was performed by trumpeter Jesse McGuire and actor Verne Troyer commanded the drivers to start their engines. Ward initially struggled to fire his engine, but joined the track after his team fixed his issue.

The green flag was waved by Bob Bove, president of the Arizonian division of Jiffy Lube, to signify the start of the race. Hornish Jr. pulled ahead of Ray in the first turn to take the lead on the first lap. Carlson slowed on the front stretch that same lap but eventually managed to pick up his pace. On lap 20, the first caution flag was issued when Erwin spun in turn two. Several drivers made pit stops during the caution. Hornish Jr. remained on the track and led on the lap-24 restart, followed by Ray and Grégoire. On lap 30, Grégoire had gotten by Ray for second place. Hornish Jr. opened up a 5.8-second lead by the 42nd lap, but his gap had shortened to 1.9 seconds three laps later as he maneuvered around lapped drivers. Ray overtook Grégoire for second on lap 59.

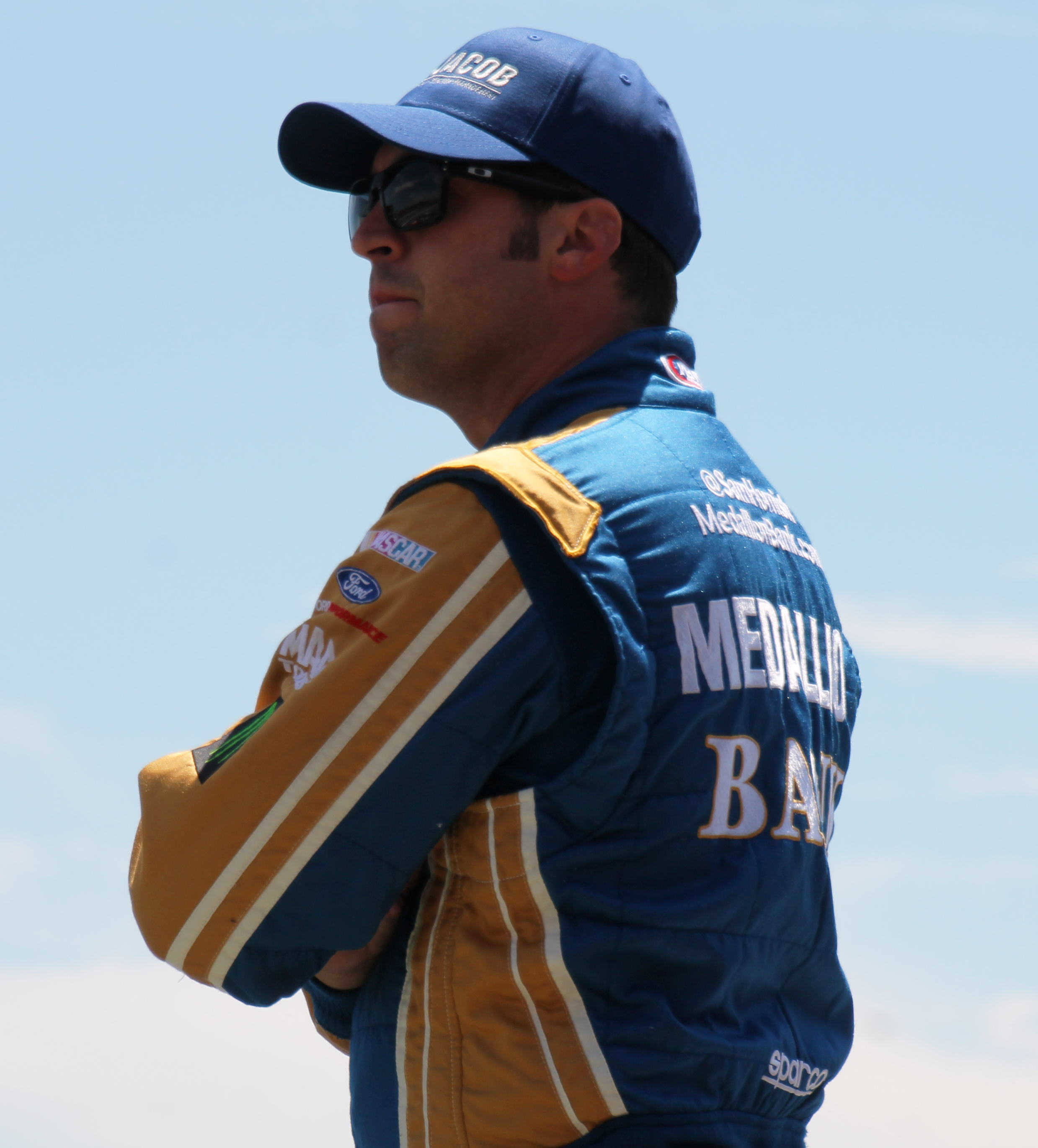
Sam Hornish Jr. (pictured in 2015) earned his first Indy Racing Northern Light Series win.

Green-flag pit stops began on the 62nd lap. On lap 68, Hornish Jr. was passed for the lead by Ray and made a pit stop for new tires and fuel. Lazier nearly collided into Hornish Jr. as he entered his pit stall. Ray made his stop six laps later, giving the first position to de Ferran. On the 77th lap, Schroeder hit the rear end of de Ferran's car as de Ferran slowed into pit road; the two drivers spun into the turn-four wall, collecting Dismore in the process, and triggered the second caution. Castroneves and Sharp assumed the top two positions before making their stops on lap 82, allowing Ray to lead the field back up to speed at the lap-90 restart, with Grégoire in second and Castroneves third.

On the 102nd lap, Lazier passed teammate Wattles for sixth place. By lap 115, Hornish Jr. moved into the fourth position. Three laps later, Ray's 1.2-second lead had diminished as he and Grégoire drove alongside each other in turn two while passing a lapped driver. The battle ended as Grégoire drove to the left of Ray and took the lead in the first turn. Two laps later, a cloud of smoke trailed from Ray's engine and he drove into pit road, retiring from the race. The third caution was necessitated to clean the oil that spilled from Ray's engine onto the track. All the leaders, including Grégoire, elected to make pit stops. As a result of a quick pit stop, Hornish Jr. moved into the lead for the restart on lap 131. The fourth caution was issued shortly thereafter when Lazier struggled to shift his gears and Grégoire, who slowed to avoid colliding into Lazier, was hit from behind by Buhl and spun into the turn-two wall. Cheever came into pit road under the caution with a blown engine.

None of the leaders made stops during the caution and Hornish Jr. led the field at the restart on lap 138, ahead of Castroneves and Lazier. Salazar took third place from Lazier on lap 140, and moved into the second position a lap later as Castroneves suffered an engine failure. Fisher experienced catastrophic engine troubles as her car caught on fire on the 148th lap; she parked the car at the exit of pit road and no caution was issued. Salazar, meanwhile, closed Hornish Jr.'s gap to a measly 0.1 seconds by lap 150, although Hornish Jr. opened a 2.4-second gap over Salazar two laps later. The fifth caution was prompted on the 159th lap when Wattles spun at the exit of turn two and slammed the inside back stretch retaining wall with such force that it cracked open.

The race resumed on lap 167 with Hornish Jr. leading Salazar and Sharp. Lazier quickly passed Sharp for third, but on lap 170, he relayed to his team that his car was stuck in fourth gear. Hornish Jr., on the other hand, maintained the lead for the remaining 33 laps and earned his first win in the Indy Racing Northern Light Series, becoming the youngest winner in series history and second-youngest winner in American open-wheel car racing at 21 years, 8 months, and 16 days old. His record was later broken by Marco Andretti in 2006. Hornish Jr. finished 1.3786 seconds ahead of Salazar in second; Lazier finished third, Sharp was fourth, and Boat came in fifth. Giaffone, Ward, McGehee, Calkins, and Daré completed the top-ten finishers. The last four classified finishers were Buhl, Hamilton, Hattori, and Erwin. The race had five cautions and seven lead changes among six different drivers. Hornish Jr.'s total of 140 laps led was the most of any competitor in the race.

=== Post-race ===
Hornish Jr. appeared in victory lane to celebrate his first win, which earned him $124,300. Hornish Jr. was delighted with the victory, saying: "What else could you ask for? To come to the first race and get all the jitters gone, it’s great. I hope we have a lot more of these." In the post-race press conference, Hornish Jr. thanked his team for providing him a car which he felt he "could drive anywhere on the track". Second-place finisher Salazar joked about his result: "I told my wife that I’ve finished every place but second. I had to get second. That’s nice enough." He also felt that the cars were so "evenly matched" that it was hard to pass other drivers. Lazier was grateful to finished third despite being hindered by his faulty gearbox, saying: "Of course, it hurt us but at the same time how can you complain? We're on the podium. This is a great way to start the season in defense of the championship. We're really blessed."

Despite de Ferran and Castroneves' poor finishes, they both expressed anticipation for the Indianapolis 500. Their team owner Roger Penske was also pleased with the race, saying: "I think we learned a lot. We obviously need to get reliability up to where it needs to be. Hopefully we got our bad luck out of the way today." Schroeder, who crashed into de Ferran, explained that he thought de Ferran was defending his position. PDM Racing owner Paul Diatlovich was quick to defend Schroeder, stating: "Jeret drove a flawless race and had already moved up 10 positions when this unfortunate incident occurred. We were looking forward to a top-10 finish at least." Ray was left disappointed with his early retirement: "This is really disappointing for Team Menard. It was handling well, and I could run anywhere on the track I wanted. About 30 laps ago, I started to lose power. I think the fuel pressure went low, and I cracked my block." He also praised Hornish Jr. for his performance in the race, admitting he was "a little jealous" of his success at his young age.

As this was the first race of the season, Hornish Jr.'s win allowed him to assume the lead in the Drivers' Championship with 52 points, twelve more than Salazar in second and seventeen more than Lazier in third. Sharp took fourth on 32 points and Boat was fifth with 30 points. In the Manufacturers' Championship, Oldsmobile earned 11 points, four more than second-place Nissan.

=== Race classification ===
Pos	No.	Driver	Team	Laps	Time/Retired	Grid	Pts.
1	4	(United States) Sam Hornish Jr.	Panther Racing	200	1:36:56.7051	2	52^{1}
2	14	(Chile) Eliseo Salazar	A. J. Foyt Racing	200	+1.3786	13	40
3	91	(United States) Buddy Lazier	Hemelgarn Racing	200	+1.8960	6	35
4	8	(United States) Scott Sharp	Kelley Racing	200	+4.8519	10	32
5	98	(United States) Billy Boat	Curb-Agajanian-Beck Motorsports	200	+16.7453	7	30
6	21	(Brazil) Felipe Giaffone	Treadway-Hubbard Racing	199	+1 lap	9	28
7	35	(United States) Jeff Ward	Heritage Motorsports	199	+1 lap	3	26
8	10	(United States) Robby McGehee	Cahill Racing	198	+2 laps	16	24
9	12	(United States) Buzz Calkins	Bradley Motorsports	197	+3 laps	11	22
10	88	(Brazil) Airton Daré	Team Xtreme Racing	197	+3 laps	18	20
11	24	(United States) Robbie Buhl	Dreyer & Reinbold Racing	196	+4 laps	8	19
12	99	(United States) Davey Hamilton	Sam Schmidt Motorsports	192	+8 laps	20	18
13	55	(Japan) Shigeaki Hattori	Vertex-Cunningham Racing	192	+8 laps	24	17
14	30	(United States) Brandon Erwin	McCormack Motorsports	185	+15 laps	26	16
15	6	(United States) Tyce Carlson	TriStar Motorsports	162	Handling	19	15
16	92	(United States) Stan Wattles	Hemelgarn Racing	157	Accident	14	14
17	15	(United States) Sarah Fisher	Walker Racing	145	Engine	21	13
18	68	(Brazil) Hélio Castroneves	Team Penske	142	Engine	17	12
19	51	(United States) Eddie Cheever	Cheever Indy Racing	133	Throttle link	12	11
20	31	(United States) Casey Mears	Galles Racing	133	Electrical	25	10
21	7	(France) Stéphan Grégoire	Dick Simon Racing	131	Accident	4	9
22	2	(United States) Greg Ray	Team Menard	121	Engine	1	8
23	3	(United States) Al Unser Jr.	Galles Racing	101	Engine	23	7
24	66	(Brazil) Gil de Ferran	Team Penske	76	Accident	5	6
25	28	(United States) Mark Dismore	Kelley Racing	75	Accident	15	5
26	9	(United States) Jeret Schroeder	PDM Racing	74	Accident	22	4
27	32	(France) Didier André	Galles Racing	53	Handling	27	3

Notes

- ^1 — Includes two bonus points for leading the most laps.

== Championship standings after the race ==
Drivers' Championship standings
	Pos.	Driver	Points
Unchanged	1	(United States) Sam Hornish Jr.	52
Unchanged	2	(Chile) Eliseo Salazar	40 (–12)
Unchanged	3	(United States) Buddy Lazier	35 (–17)
Unchanged	4	(United States) Scott Sharp	32 (–20)
Unchanged	5	(United States) Billy Boat	30 (–22)

Manufacturers' Championship standings
	Pos.	Manufacturer	Points
Unchanged	1	(United States) Oldsmobile	11
Unchanged	2	(Japan) Nissan	7 (–4)

- Note: Only the top five positions are included.

Previous race: 2000 Excite 500	Indy Racing Northern Light Series; 2001 season	Next race: 2001 Infiniti Grand Prix of Miami
Previous race: 2000 MCI Worldcomm Indy 200	Phoenix Indy 200	Next race: 2002 Bombardier ATV Copper World Indy 200
