= 2002 Indy Racing League =

American open-wheel racing season

2002 Indy Racing League season
- Indy Racing League

Season
- Races: 15
- Start date: March 2
- End date: September 15

Awards
- Drivers' champion: (United States) Sam Hornish Jr.
- Manufacturers' Cup: (United States) Chevrolet
- Rookie of the Year: (France) Laurent Rédon
- Indianapolis 500 winner: (Brazil) Hélio Castroneves

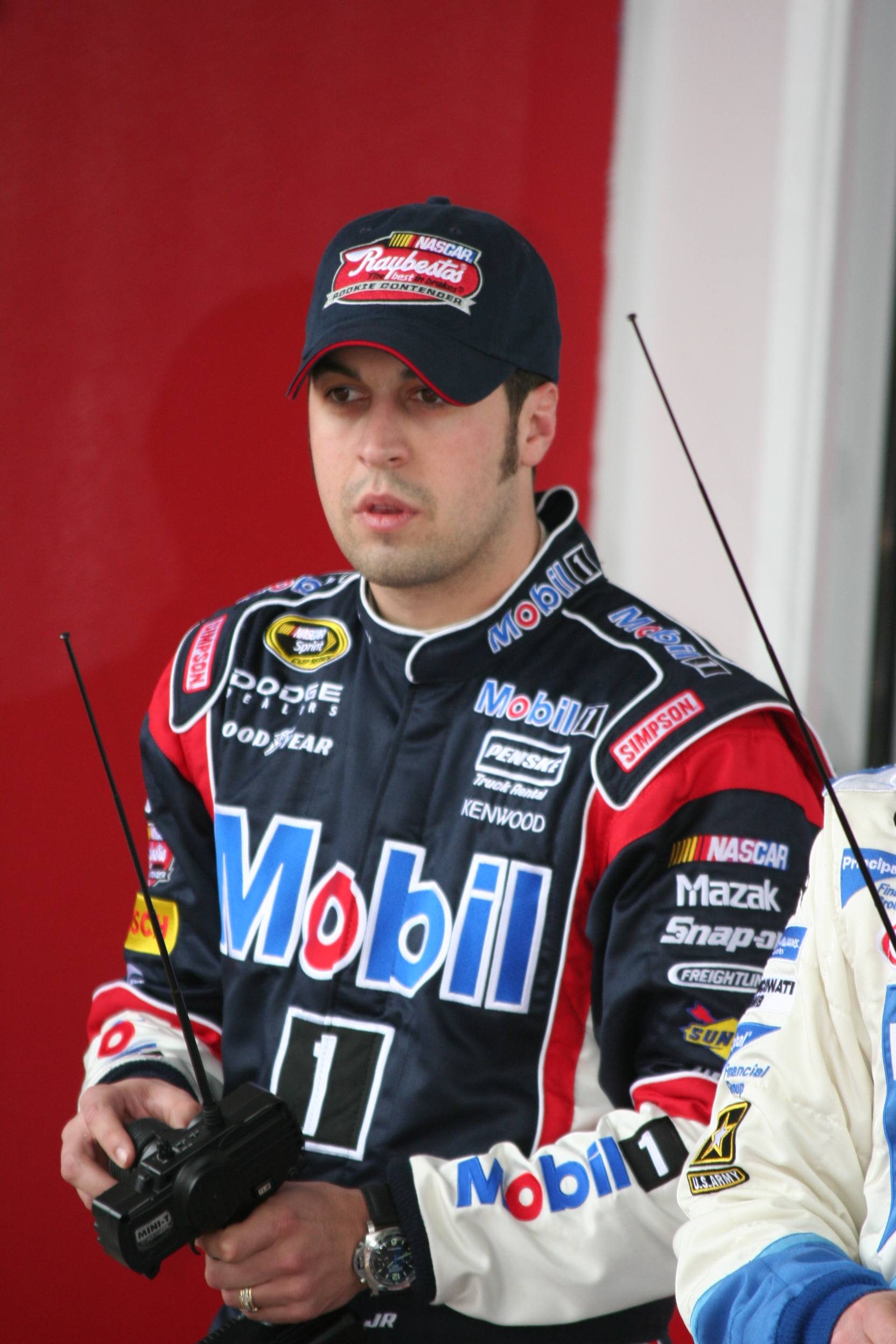
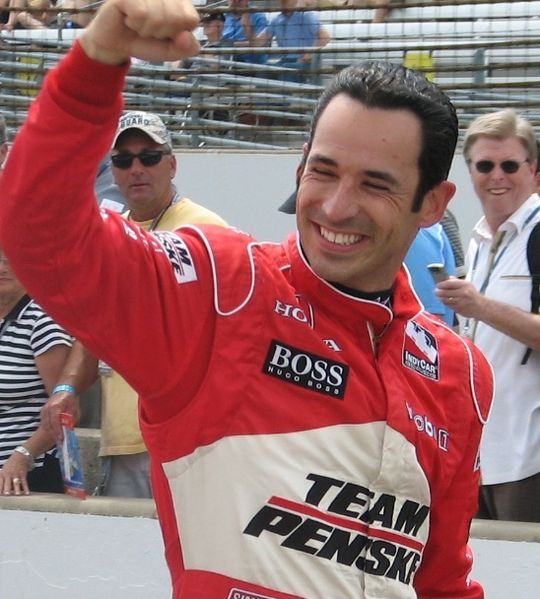
Sam Hornish Jr. (left) won his second Drivers' Championship (second straight title) while Hélio Castroneves (right) finished second in the championship.

The 2002 Indy Racing League (IRL) was the seventh season of the IRL, sanctioned by the organization of the same name. It encompassed the 91st championship season of premier American open-wheel car racing, alongside the rivaling 2002 CART FedEx Championship Series. It was seen as a season of transition, with two reigning CART championship teams, Team Penske and Target Chip Ganassi Racing, joining the series with full time entries. The Oldsmobile engine was rebranded as a Chevrolet, and both Honda and Toyota announced their participation in the series starting in 2003 while Infiniti announced its withdrawal.

Sam Hornish Jr. won 5 races on his way to his second straight championship ahead of Penske juggernaut Hélio Castroneves, winner of two races including a second straight Indy 500, on his way to second in the championship. The season was also notable for seeing six drivers win their first career Indy Racing League races.

== Confirmed entries ==
Team	Chassis	Engine	#	Drivers	Rounds
(United States) Team Menard	Dallara	Chevrolet	2	(United States) Jaques Lazier	1–4
(United States) Team Menard	Dallara	Chevrolet	2	(United States) P. J. Jones (Note: Injured during a practice crash at Indianapolis.)	5
(United States) Team Menard	Dallara	Chevrolet	2	(Brazil) Raul Boesel	5–6
(United States) Team Menard	Dallara	Chevrolet	2	(United States) Mark Dismore	7–11
(United States) Team Menard	Dallara	Chevrolet	2	(Brazil) Vítor Meira R	12–15
(United States) Team Menard	Dallara	Chevrolet	31	(United States) Robby Gordon	5
(United States) Marlboro Team Penske	Dallara	Chevrolet	3	(Brazil) Hélio Castroneves	All
(United States) Marlboro Team Penske	Dallara	Chevrolet	6	(Brazil) Gil de Ferran	1–14
(United States) Marlboro Team Penske	Dallara	Chevrolet	6	(Italy) Max Papis	15
(United States) Panther Racing	Dallara	Chevrolet	4	(United States) Sam Hornish Jr.	All
(United States) Panther Racing	Dallara	Chevrolet	15	(United Kingdom) Dan Wheldon R	14–15
(United States) Treadway Racing	G-Force; Dallara (Note: Used by Anthony Lazzaro at Pikes Peak; entry run in cooperation with Sam Schmidt Motorsports.)	Chevrolet	5	(United States) Rick Treadway R	5
(United States) Treadway Racing	G-Force; Dallara	Chevrolet	55	(United States) Rick Treadway R	1–4, 6, 9
(United States) Treadway Racing	G-Force; Dallara	Chevrolet	55	(Netherlands) Arie Luyendyk	5, 11
(United States) Treadway Racing	G-Force; Dallara	Chevrolet	55	(United States) Anthony Lazzaro R	7
(United States) Treadway Racing	G-Force; Dallara	Chevrolet	55	(United States) Will Langhorne R	12, 14–15
(United States) Treadway Racing	G-Force; Dallara	Chevrolet	55	(United States) Robby McGehee	13
(United States) Kelley Racing	Dallara	Chevrolet	7	(United States) Al Unser Jr.	1–9, 12–15
(United States) Kelley Racing	Dallara	Chevrolet	7	(United States) Tony Renna R	10–11
(United States) Kelley Racing	Dallara	Chevrolet	78	(United States) Tony Renna R	12–15
(United States) Kelley Racing	Dallara	Chevrolet	8	(United States) Scott Sharp	All
(United States) Target Chip Ganassi Racing	G-Force	Chevrolet	9	(United States) Jeff Ward	All
(United States) Target Chip Ganassi Racing	G-Force	Chevrolet	22	(Sweden) Kenny Bräck	5
(United States) Target Chip Ganassi Racing	G-Force	Chevrolet	33	(Brazil) Bruno Junqueira	5
(United States) Cahill Racing	Dallara	Chevrolet	10	(United States) Robby McGehee	1–5
(United States) A. J. Foyt Enterprises	Dallara	Chevrolet	11	(Chile) Eliseo Salazar	1–3, 10–15
(United States) A. J. Foyt Enterprises	Dallara	Chevrolet	11	(United States) Richie Hearn	4
(United States) A. J. Foyt Enterprises	Dallara	Chevrolet	11	(United States) Greg Ray	5–9
(United States) A. J. Foyt Enterprises	Dallara	Chevrolet	14	(Brazil) Airton Daré	All
(United States) A. J. Foyt Enterprises	Dallara	Chevrolet	14	(United States) Donnie Beechler (Note: Injured during a practice crash at Homestead.)	1
(United States) A. J. Foyt Enterprises	Dallara	Chevrolet	41	(United States) Donnie Beechler	5
(United States) A. J. Foyt Enterprises	Dallara	Chevrolet	41	(United States) Greg Ray	10–13
(United States) Bradley Motorsports	Dallara	Infiniti	12	(Japan) Shigeaki Hattori	2–7
(United States) Bradley Motorsports	Dallara	Infiniti	12	(Brazil) Raul Boesel	9–15
(United States) Bradley Motorsports	Dallara	Infiniti	67	(United States) Rick Treadway R	15
(United States) Walker Racing	Dallara	Chevrolet	15	(Spain) Oriol Servià	5
(United States) Racing Professionals	G-Force; Dallara (Note: Raced from Texas onwards; both chassis were used during the Indy 500 month.)	Chevrolet	16	(United States) Jon Herb	1–8
(United States) Mo Nunn Racing	G-Force	Chevrolet	17	(Brazil) Tony Kanaan	5
(United States) Mo Nunn Racing	G-Force	Chevrolet	21	(Brazil) Felipe Giaffone	All
(United States) PDM Racing	Dallara	Chevrolet	18	(United States) Tyce Carlson	1–2
(United States) PDM Racing	Dallara	Chevrolet	18	(United States) Jeret Schroeder	3
(United States) PDM Racing	Dallara	Chevrolet	18	(Australia) John de Vries R	6
(United States) PDM Racing	Dallara	Chevrolet	18	(United States) Scott Mayer R	14
(United States) PDM Racing	Dallara	Chevrolet	18	(United States) Cory Kruseman R	15
(United States) PDM Racing	Dallara	Chevrolet	99	(United States) Anthony Lazzaro R (Note: Replaced during the second week of Indy 500 practice.)	5
(United States) PDM Racing	Dallara	Chevrolet	99	(United States) Jimmy Kite	5
(United States) Team Rahal	Dallara	Chevrolet	19	(United States) Jimmy Vasser	3, 5
(United States) Convergent Racing	G-Force	Chevrolet	20	(Japan) Hideki Noda R	1–3
(United States) Sam Schmidt Motorsports	Dallara	Chevrolet	20	(United States) Richie Hearn	5, 7–12
(United States) Sam Schmidt Motorsports	Dallara	Chevrolet	20	(United States) Greg Ray	14–15
(United States) Sam Schmidt Motorsports	Dallara	Chevrolet	20	(United States) Anthony Lazzaro R	13
(United States) Sam Schmidt Motorsports	Dallara	Chevrolet	99	(United States) Anthony Lazzaro R	1–2, 4
(United States) Sam Schmidt Motorsports	Dallara	Chevrolet	99	(United States) Richie Hearn	3, 6
(United States) Sam Schmidt Motorsports	Dallara	Chevrolet	99	(United States) Mark Dismore	5
(United States) Dreyer & Reinbold Racing	G-Force	Infiniti	24	(United States) Robbie Buhl	1–3, 5–15
(United States) Dreyer & Reinbold Racing	G-Force	Infiniti	24	(United States) Memo Gidley	3
(United States) Dreyer & Reinbold Racing	G-Force	Infiniti	24	(United States) Sarah Fisher	4
(United States) Dreyer & Reinbold Racing	G-Force	Infiniti	23	(United States) Sarah Fisher	5, 8–15
(United States) Team Green	Dallara	Chevrolet	26	(Canada) Paul Tracy	5
(United States) Team Green	Dallara	Chevrolet	27	(United Kingdom) Dario Franchitti	5
(United States) Team Green	Dallara	Chevrolet	39	(United States) Michael Andretti	5
(United States) Indy Regency Racing	G-Force	Chevrolet	28	(Japan) Hideki Noda R	13–15
(United States) 310 Racing	G-Force	Chevrolet	31	(United States) George Mack R	All
(United States) Duesenberg Brothers Racing (United States) CURB/Agajanian/Beck Motorsports	Dallara	Chevrolet	32	(United Kingdom) Johnny Herbert (Note: Withdrew during Bump Day due to a racing conflict.)	5
(United States) Duesenberg Brothers Racing (United States) CURB/Agajanian/Beck Motorsports	Dallara	Chevrolet	32	(United States) Memo Gidley	5
(United States) Duesenberg Brothers Racing (United States) CURB/Agajanian/Beck Motorsports	Dallara	Chevrolet	54	(United States) Robby McGehee	7–9
(United States) Conquest Racing	Dallara	Infiniti	34	(France) Laurent Redon R	All
(United States) Brayton Racing	Dallara	Chevrolet	37	(Australia) John de Vries R (Note: Replaced at Indianapolis ahead of Bump Day.)	1–5
(United States) Brayton Racing	Dallara	Chevrolet	37	(United States) Scott Harrington	5, 11
(United States) Blair Racing	Dallara	Chevrolet	44	(United States) Alex Barron	All
(United States) Red Bull Cheever Racing	Dallara	Infiniti	51	(United States) Eddie Cheever	All
(United States) Red Bull Cheever Racing	Dallara	Infiniti	52	(South Africa) Tomas Scheckter R	1–12
(United States) Red Bull Cheever Racing	Dallara	Infiniti	52	(United States) Buddy Rice R	13–15
(United States) Red Bull Cheever Racing	Dallara	Infiniti	53	(United States) Buddy Rice R	11–12
(United States) Red Bull Cheever Racing	Dallara	Infiniti	53	(Italy) Max Papis	5
(United States) Red Bull Cheever Racing	Dallara	Infiniti	53	(United States) Robby McGehee	15
(United States) Zali Racing	G-Force	Chevrolet	81	(United States) Billy Roe	1, 5
(United States) Hemelgarn Racing	Dallara	Chevrolet	91	(United States) Buddy Lazier	All
(United States) CURB/Agajanian/Boat Indy Racing	Dallara	Chevrolet; Infiniti (Note: Used from Kansas onwards.)	98	(United States) Billy Boat	All

== Schedule ==
Rnd	Date	Race Name	Track	City
1	March 2	Grand Prix of Miami	Homestead-Miami Speedway	Homestead, Florida
2	March 17	Bombardier ATV 200	Phoenix International Raceway	Phoenix, Arizona
3	March 24	Yamaha Indy 400	California Speedway	Fontana, California
4	April 21	Firestone Indy 225	Nazareth Speedway	Nazareth, Pennsylvania
5	May 26	86th Indianapolis 500	Indianapolis Motor Speedway	Speedway, Indiana
6	June 8	Boomtown 500	Texas Motor Speedway	Fort Worth, Texas
7	June 16	Radisson Indy 225	Pikes Peak International Raceway	Fountain, Colorado
8	June 29	SunTrust Indy Challenge	Richmond International Raceway	Richmond, Virginia
9	July 7	Ameristar Casino Indy 200	Kansas Speedway	Kansas City, Kansas
10	July 20	Firestone Indy 200	Nashville Superspeedway	Lebanon, Tennessee
11	July 28	Michigan Indy 400	Michigan International Speedway	Brooklyn, Michigan
12	August 11	Belterra Casino Indy 300	Kentucky Speedway	Sparta, Kentucky
13	August 25	Gateway Indy 250	Gateway International Raceway	Madison, Illinois
14	September 8	Delphi Indy 300	Chicagoland Speedway	Joliet, Illinois
15	September 15	Chevy 500	Texas Motor Speedway	Fort Worth, Texas

== Results ==
Rd.	Race	Pole position	Fastest lap	Most laps led	Race winner			
Rd.	Race	Pole position	Fastest lap	Most laps led	Driver	Team	Chassis	Engine
1	Homestead	(United States) Sam Hornish Jr.	(United States) Jeff Ward	(United States) Sam Hornish Jr.	(United States) Sam Hornish Jr.	Panther Racing	Dallara	Chevrolet
2	Phoenix	(Brazil) Hélio Castroneves	(United States) Robbie Buhl	(United States) Sam Hornish Jr.	(Brazil) Hélio Castroneves	Team Penske	Dallara	Chevrolet
3	Fontana	(United States) Eddie Cheever	(South Africa) Tomas Scheckter	(United States) Sam Hornish Jr.	(United States) Sam Hornish Jr.	Panther Racing	Dallara	Chevrolet
4	Nazareth	(Brazil) Gil de Ferran	(South Africa) Tomas Scheckter	(Brazil) Gil de Ferran	(United States) Scott Sharp	Kelley Racing	Dallara	Chevrolet
5	Indianapolis	(Brazil) Bruno Junqueira	(South Africa) Tomas Scheckter	(South Africa) Tomas Scheckter	(Brazil) Hélio Castroneves	Team Penske	Dallara	Chevrolet
6	Texas 1	(South Africa) Tomas Scheckter	(United States) Eddie Cheever	(South Africa) Tomas Scheckter	(United States) Jeff Ward	Chip Ganassi Racing	G-Force	Chevrolet
7	Pikes Peak	(Brazil) Gil de Ferran	(Brazil) Felipe Giaffone	(Brazil) Gil de Ferran	(Brazil) Gil de Ferran	Team Penske	Dallara	Chevrolet
8	Richmond	(Brazil) Gil de Ferran	(United States) Buddy Lazier	(Brazil) Gil de Ferran	(United States) Sam Hornish Jr.	Panther Racing	Dallara	Chevrolet
9	Kansas	(South Africa) Tomas Scheckter	(South Africa) Tomas Scheckter	(South Africa) Tomas Scheckter	(Brazil) Airton Daré	A. J. Foyt Enterprises	Dallara	Chevrolet
10	Nashville	(United States) Billy Boat	(South Africa) Tomas Scheckter	(United States) Sam Hornish Jr.	(United States) Alex Barron	Blair Racing	Dallara	Chevrolet
11	Michigan	(South Africa) Tomas Scheckter	(South Africa) Tomas Scheckter	(South Africa) Tomas Scheckter	(South Africa) Tomas Scheckter	Cheever Racing	Dallara	Infiniti
12	Kentucky	(United States) Sarah Fisher	(South Africa) Tomas Scheckter	(Brazil) Felipe Giaffone	(Brazil) Felipe Giaffone	Mo Nunn Racing	G-Force	Chevrolet
13	Gateway	(Brazil) Gil de Ferran	(United States) Sam Hornish Jr.	(Brazil) Hélio Castroneves	(Brazil) Gil de Ferran	Team Penske	Dallara	Chevrolet
14	Chicagoland	(United States) Sam Hornish Jr.	(United States) Buddy Rice	(United States) Sam Hornish Jr.	(United States) Sam Hornish Jr.	Panther Racing	Dallara	Chevrolet
15	Texas 2	(Brazil) Vítor Meira	(United States) Buddy Rice	(Brazil) Hélio Castroneves	(United States) Sam Hornish Jr.	Panther Racing	Dallara	Chevrolet

BOLD indicates a Superspeedway. Note: All races running on Oval/Speedway.

== Race summaries ==
=== Grand Prix of Miami ===
This race was held on March 2 at Homestead-Miami Speedway. Sam Hornish Jr. won the pole. The race was dominated by Sam Hornish Jr. who at one point had a lap on the entire field. On lap 193 of 200, while Hornish was leading by more than 20 seconds, fourth placed Robbie Buhl's engine expired, bringing out the yellow and packing up the field. The green came back out on Lap 197, but Airton Dare crashed immediately in turn 2 on the restart. The race finished under yellow, with Hornish on the top step of the podium. Gil de Ferran and Helio Castroneves were second and third respectively, for Team Penske in their first race of their first full season in the IRL.

Top ten results

1. 4- Sam Hornish Jr.
2. 6- Gil de Ferran
3. 3- Hélio Castroneves
4. 9- Jeff Ward
5. 11- Eliseo Salazar
6. 52- Tomas Scheckter
7. 21- Felipe Giaffone
8. 44- Alex Barron
9. 99- Anthony Lazzaro
10. 14- Airton Daré

=== Bombardier ATV 200 ===
This race was held on March 17 at Phoenix International Raceway. Hélio Castroneves won the pole.

Top ten results

1. 3- Hélio Castroneves
2. 6- Gil de Ferran
3. 4- Sam Hornish Jr.
4. 11- Eliseo Salazar
5. 7- Al Unser Jr.
6. 2- Jaques Lazier
7. 91- Buddy Lazier
8. 98- Billy Boat
9. 55- Rick Treadway
10. 20- Hideki Noda

=== Inaugural Yamaha Indy 400 ===
This race was held on March 24 at California Speedway. Eddie Cheever won the pole.

Top ten results

1. 4- Sam Hornish Jr.
2. 2- Jaques Lazier
3. 34- Laurent Rédon
4. 6- Gil de Ferran
5. 3- Hélio Castroneves
6. 21- Felipe Giaffone
7. 91- Buddy Lazier
8. 8- Scott Sharp
9. 19- Jimmy Vasser
10. 9- Jeff Ward

=== Inaugural Firestone Indy 225 ===
This race was held on April 21 at Nazareth Speedway. Gil de Ferran won the pole.

Top ten results

1. 8- Scott Sharp
2. 21- Felipe Giaffone
3. 6- Gil de Ferran
4. 24- Sarah Fisher
5. 3- Hélio Castroneves
6. 44- Alex Barron
7. 51- Eddie Cheever
8. 98- Billy Boat
9. 99- Anthony Lazzaro
10. 12- Shigeaki Hattori

=== 86th Indianapolis 500 ===
The Indy 500 was held on May 26 at Indianapolis Motor Speedway. Bruno Junqueira sat on pole. The race end was one of the most controversial in history as Paul Tracy passed Hélio Castroneves just as the yellow was coming out for a crash. Race officials ruled that the pass occurred after the yellow and declared Castroneves the winner.

Top ten results

1. 3- Hélio Castroneves
2. 26- Paul Tracy
3. 21- Felipe Giaffone
4. 44- Alex Barron
5. 51- Eddie Cheever
6. 20- Richie Hearn
7. 39- Michael Andretti
8. 31- Robby Gordon
9. 9- Jeff Ward
10. 6- Gil de Ferran

=== Boomtown 500 ===
This race was held on June 8 at Texas Motor Speedway. Tomas Scheckter won the pole.

Top ten results

1. 9- Jeff Ward
2. 7- Al Unser Jr.
3. 14- Airton Daré
4. 3- Hélio Castroneves
5. 21- Felipe Giaffone
6. 12- Shigeaki Hattori
7. 98- Billy Boat
8. 91- Buddy Lazier
9. 99- Richie Hearn
10. 44- Alex Barron

=== Radisson Indy 225 ===
This race was held on June 16 at Pikes Peak International Raceway. Gil de Ferran won the pole.

Top ten results

1. 6- Gil de Ferran
2. 3- Hélio Castroneves
3. 4- Sam Hornish Jr.
4. 21- Felipe Giaffone
5. 8- Scott Sharp
6. 7- Al Unser Jr.
7. 34- Laurent Rédon
8. 51- Eddie Cheever
9. 14- Airton Daré
10. 44- Alex Barron

=== SunTrust Indy Challenge ===
This race was held on June 29 at Richmond International Raceway. Gil de Ferran won the pole.

Top ten results

1. 4- Sam Hornish Jr.
2. 6- Gil de Ferran
3. 21- Felipe Giaffone
4. 52- Tomas Scheckter
5. 7- Al Unser Jr.
6. 14- Airton Daré
7. 20- Richie Hearn
8. 9- Jeff Ward
9. 54- Robby McGehee
10. 44- Alex Barron

=== Ameristar Casino Indy 200 ===
This race was held on July 7 at Kansas Speedway. Tomas Scheckter won the pole.

Top ten results

1. 14- Airton Daré
2. 4- Sam Hornish Jr.
3. 3- Hélio Castroneves
4. 21- Felipe Giaffone
5. 6- Gil de Ferran
6. 8- Scott Sharp
7. 91- Buddy Lazier
8. 44-Alex Barron
9. 98- Billy Boat
10. 20- Richie Hearn

=== Firestone Indy 200 ===
This race was held on July 20 at Nashville Superspeedway. Billy Boat won the pole.

Top ten results

1. 44- Alex Barron
2. 6- Gil de Ferran
3. 4- Sam Hornish Jr.
4. 20- Richie Hearn
5. 12- Raul Boesel
6. 51- Eddie Cheever
7. 21- Felipe Giaffone
8. 8- Scott Sharp
9. 3- Hélio Castroneves
10. 7- Tony Renna

=== Inaugural Michigan Indy 400 ===
This race was held on July 28 at Michigan International Speedway. Tomas Scheckter won the pole.

Top ten results

1. 52- Tomas Scheckter
2. 53- Buddy Rice
3. 21- Felipe Giaffone
4. 7- Tony Renna
5. 6- Gil de Ferran
6. 3- Hélio Castroneves
7. 4- Sam Hornish Jr.
8. 23- Sarah Fisher
9. 8- Scott Sharp
10. 20- Richie Hearn

=== Belterra Casino Indy 300 ===
This race was held on August 11 at Kentucky Speedway. Sarah Fisher won the pole, the first by a female driver in a major open wheel series.

Top ten results

1. 21- Felipe Giaffone
2. 4- Sam Hornish Jr.
3. 91- Buddy Lazier
4. 8- Scott Sharp
5. 3- Hélio Castroneves
6. 7- Al Unser Jr.
7. 78- Tony Renna
8. 23- Sarah Fisher
9. 44- Alex Barron
10. 24- Robbie Buhl

=== Gateway Indy 250 ===
This race was held on August 25 at Gateway International Raceway. Gil de Ferran won the pole.

Top ten results

1. 6- Gil de Ferran
2. 3- Hélio Castroneves
3. 44- Alex Barron
4. 52- Buddy Rice
5. 4- Sam Hornish Jr.
6. 24- Robbie Buhl
7. 7- Al Unser Jr.
8. 12- Raul Boesel
9. 2- Vítor Meira
10. 51- Eddie Cheever

=== Delphi Indy 300 ===
This race was held on September 8 at Chicagoland Speedway. Sam Hornish Jr. won the pole.

Top ten results

1. 4- Sam Hornish Jr.
2. 7- Al Unser Jr.
3. 91- Buddy Lazier
4. 3- Hélio Castroneves
5. 51- Eddie Cheever
6. 21- Felipe Giaffone
7. 8- Scott Sharp
8. 2- Vítor Meira
9. 52- Buddy Rice
10. 15- Dan Wheldon

Gil de Ferran was injured during a crash in this race and would miss the season finale at Texas.

=== Chevy 500 ===
This race was held on September 15 at Texas Motor Speedway. Vítor Meira won the pole.

Top ten results

1. 4- Sam Hornish Jr.**
2. 3- Hélio Castroneves
3. 2- Vítor Meira
4. 8- Scott Sharp
5. 44- Alex Barron
6. 52- Buddy Rice
7. 91- Buddy Lazier
8. 51- Eddie Cheever
9. 78- Tony Renna
10. 34- Laurent Rédon

Max Papis filled in for the injured Gil de Ferran at Penske; however, he finished 21st due to a blown engine.

By winning the race, Sam Hornish Jr. won his second championship in a row.

== Points standings ==
Pos	Driver	HOM	PHX	CAL	NAZ	INDY	TMS1	PPR	RIC	KAN	NSS	MIS	KEN	GTW	CHI	TMS2	Pts
1	(United States) Sam Hornish Jr.	**1***	3*	1*	17	25	18	3	1	2	3*	7	2	5	**1***	1	531
2	(Brazil) Hélio Castroneves	3	**1**	5	5	1	4	2	17	3	9	6	5	2*	4	2*	511
3	(Brazil) Gil de Ferran	2	2	4	**3***	10	16	**1***	**2***	5	2	5	21	**1**	23		443
4	(Brazil) Felipe Giaffone	7	19	6	2	3	5	4	3	4	7	3	1*	21	6	17	432
5	(United States) Alex Barron	8	23	12	6	4	10	10	10	8	1	12	9	3	12	5	366
6	(United States) Scott Sharp	20	16	8	1	27	14	5	21	6	8	9	4	18	7	4	332
7	(United States) Al Unser Jr.	19	5	11	12	12	2	6	5	17			6	7	2	20	311
8	(United States) Buddy Lazier	22	7	7	23	15	8	15	18	7	12	13	3	15	3	7	305
9	(Brazil) Airton Daré	10	12	13	11	13	3	9	6	1	17	23	23	11	16	12	304
10	(United States) Eddie Cheever	25	15	**20**	7	5	19	8	14	16	6	22	11	10	5	8	280
11	(United States) Jeff Ward	4	18	10	19	9	1	20	8	12	11	25	16	13	21	25	268
12	(France) Laurent Redon RY	15	14	3	15	22	15	7	15	22	16	11	20	22	25	10	229
13	(United States) Billy Boat	16	8	18	8	18	7	14	22	9	**14**	14	19	23	19	24	225
14	(South Africa) Tomas Scheckter R	6	24	24	21	26*	**17***	16	4	**15***	13	**1***	22				210
15	(United States) Richie Hearn			14	14	6	9	12	7	10	4	10	24				204
16	(United States) George Mack R	13	20	16	18	17	21	13	20	18	15	20	17	16	14	28	184
17	(United States) Robbie Buhl	12	13	Wth		16	20	23	13	21	21	24	10	6	20	18	177
18	(United States) Sarah Fisher				4	24			16	14	22	8	**8**	20	22	11	161
19	(Brazil) Raul Boesel					21	13			11	5	15	13	8	11	22	158
20	(Chile) Eliseo Salazar	5	4	15							19	19	14	14	18	16	157
21	(United States) Robby McGehee	14	21	17	13	DNQ		17	9	13				12		13	142
22	(United States) Buddy Rice R											2	12	4	9	6	140
23	(United States) Greg Ray					33	12	18	12	19	20	17	25	19	17	14	128
24	(United States) Tony Renna R										10	4	7	24	15	9	121
25	(Brazil) Vítor Meira R												15	9	8	**3**	96
26	(United States) Jaques Lazier	18	6	2	20												90
27	(Japan) Shigeaki Hattori		25	26	10	20	6	19									78
28	(United States) Rick Treadway R	24	9	22	16	29	23			23						19	76
29	(United States) Mark Dismore					32		11	11	20	18	18					73
30	(United States) Anthony Lazzaro R	9	17		9	Wth		22						DNS			70
31	(United States) Jon Herb	DNS	11	19	22	DNQ	22	21	19								70
32	(Japan) Hideki Noda R	23	10	25										17	24	27	54
33	(Australia) John de Vries R	17	22	23	DNS	Wth	11										53
34	(Canada) Paul Tracy					2											40
35	(United States) Will Langhorne R												18		13	23	36
36	(United Kingdom) Dan Wheldon R														10	15	35
37	(Netherlands) Arie Luyendyk					14						16					30
38	(United States) Michael Andretti					7											26
39	(United States) Robby Gordon					8											24
40	(United States) Jimmy Vasser			9		30											23
41	(United States) Tyce Carlson	11	Wth														23
42	(Sweden) Kenny Bräck					11											19
43	(Italy) Max Papis					23										21	16
44	(United Kingdom) Dario Franchitti					19											11
45	(United States) Billy Roe	21				DNQ											9
46	(United States) Memo Gidley			21		DNQ											9
47	(United States) Scott Harrington					DNQ						21					9
48	(United States) Cory Kruseman R															26	4
49	(United States) Jeret Schroeder			27													3
50	(Brazil) Tony Kanaan					28											2
51	(Brazil) Bruno Junqueira					**31**											1
–	(United States) Donnie Beechler	Wth				DNQ											0
–	(United States) Jimmy Kite					DNQ											0
–	(Spain) Oriol Servià					DNQ											0
–	(United States) Scott Mayer R														DNS		0
–	(United Kingdom) Johnny Herbert					Wth											0
–	(United States) P. J. Jones					Wth											0
Pos	Driver	HOM	PHX	CAL	NAZ	INDY	TMS1	PPR	RIC	KAN	NSS	MIS	KEN	GTW	CHI	TMS2	Pts

Color	Result
Gold	Winner
Silver	2nd place
Bronze	3rd place
Green	4th & 5th place
Light Blue	6th–10th place
Dark Blue	Finished (Outside Top 10)
Purple	Did not finish (Ret)
Red	Did not qualify (DNQ)
Brown	Withdrawn (Wth)
Black	Disqualified (DSQ)
White	Did not start (DNS)
Blank	Did not participate (DNP)
Blank	Not competing

**In-line notation**
**Bold**	Pole position (2 points)
Italics	Ran fastest race lap
*	Led most race laps (1 point)
DNS	Any driver who qualifies but does not start (DNS), earns all the points had they taken part.
RY	Rookie of the Year
R	Rookie

- Ties in points broken by number of wins, followed by number of 2nds, 3rds, etc., and then by number of pole positions, followed by number of times qualified 2nd, etc.

== See also ==
- 2002 Indianapolis 500
- 2002 Infiniti Pro Series season
- 2002 CART season
- 2002 Toyota Atlantic Championship season
- http://www.champcarstats.com/year/2002i.htm
- http://media.indycar.com/pdf/2011/IICS_2011_Historical_Record_Book_INT6.pdf (p. 119–121)
