= Team Xtreme =

Team Xtreme may refer to:

- Team Xtreme, a professional wrestling tag team better known as The Hardy Boyz
- Team Xtreme Racing (NASCAR), a stock car team that operated from 2009 to 2015
- Team Xtreme Racing (IndyCar), an open-wheel racing team that operated from 1999 to 2001
