= Scott Harrington (racing driver) =

American racing driver

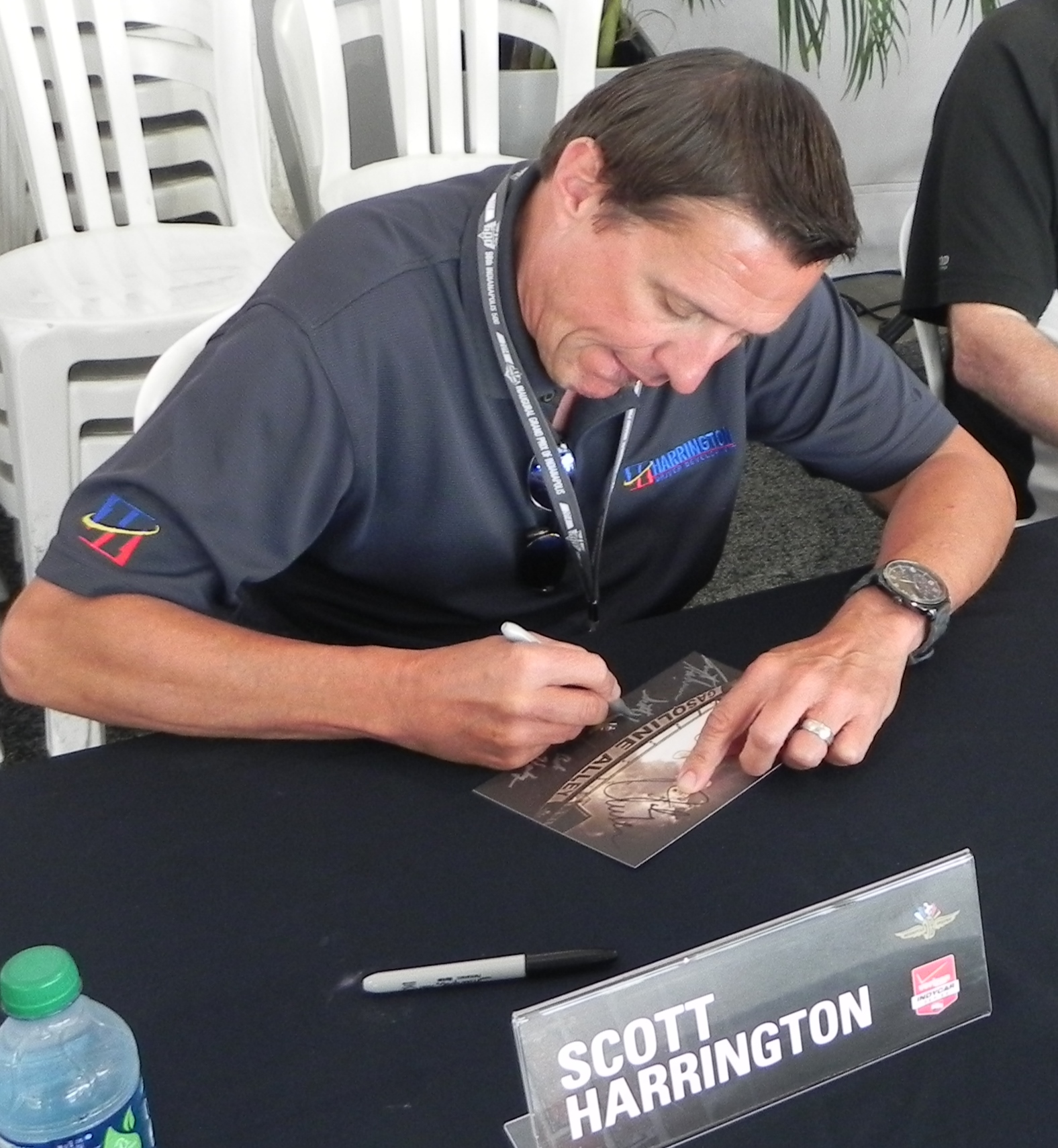
- Harrington in 2014
- Nationality: (United States) American
- Born: December 24, 1963 (age 62); Louisville, Kentucky, United States

IndyCar Series career
- 13 races run over 5 years
- Team(s): Della Penna Motorsports; Riley & Scott; Harrington Motorsports; Nienhouse Motorsports; Mid-America Motorsports; Brayton Racing
- Best finish: 14th (1999)
- First race: 1996 Indianapolis 500 (Indianapolis)
- Last race: 2002 Michigan Indy 400 (Michigan)
Wins	Podiums	Poles
0	0	0

Champ Car career
- 1 race run over 1 year
- Years active: 1989
- Team: U.S. Engineering
- Best finish: 45th (1989)
- First race: 1989 Road America 200 (Road America)
- Last race: 1989 Road America 200 (Road America)
Wins	Podiums	Poles
0	0	0

Previous series
- 2003 1992–1994 1989 1988 1987–1988: Indy Pro Series; SCCA Can-Am; CART; ARS; Toyota Atlantic

Awards
- 1999: Indy Racing League Rookie of the Year

Scott Harrington (born December 24, 1963) is a second generation American former auto racing driver, formerly active in the Indy Racing League and sportscar racing. He is now a private racing driver coach. His father, Gene Harrington, was a veteran of both SCCA and IMSA competition.

== Biography ==
Harrington was born in Louisville, Kentucky and attended the University of Louisville. Starting out on two wheels, Harrington won a number of championships and achieved much success in the world of AMA Motocross and Supercross. In 1986, Sports Car Magazine picked Harrington as one of the three most promising drivers in the U.S. He was a multiple race winner in Toyota Formula Atlantic, finishing third in the 1988 championship despite running the uncompetitive Ralt chassis. He was the only person ever to win a race in the 1988 Ralt. From 1992 through 1994, Harrington had much success in the SCCA Shelby Can-Am series. During his tenure in the series, he won more races than any other driver. He won the 1992 championship and scored race wins in every season.

An accomplished open wheel racer who made a single CART start in 1989, Harrington made a last second Bump Day run to qualify for the first IRL-sanctioned Indianapolis 500 in 1996. In 1999, he ran a full IRL season with his own team and had numerous top ten finishes, including a top five finish at Phoenix International Raceway, at the time the highest finishing position for the Infiniti engine. Despite failing to qualify for the Indy 500 and suffering serious injuries at Texas 1 (broken left tibia, right fibula, right foot and three ribs) he won the Rookie of the Year honors by a slim margin over Robby McGehee. Harrington attempted to qualify for seven different Indy 500 races but only succeeded once, in his second attempt in 1996. In 1998, he was well on his way to a top qualifying position when he suffered a blown engine that ended his month as the team had no backup. He had a best IRL finish of fourth at Phoenix in 1999 and had a total of fourteen series starts, which is the fewest total starts by any IRL Rookie of the Year. Never being one to be short on speed, his bad luck at the Speedway was well known as he won the Jigger Award for his bad luck. Harrington is also the only person to ever compete in Formula Atlantic, the original Indy Lights Series, the Infiniti Pro Series, the CART Indy Car Series and the IRL Indy Car Series.

Harrington's career was affected by arrests and convictions for driving while intoxicated. Harrington is also one of the few American drivers to compete in the "Big Three" of American motorsports - the Indy 500, the 24 Hours of Daytona and the 12 Hours of Sebring. Harrington also competed in the SVRA celebrity Pro-Am in 2014, 2015, 2016, 2017 and 2018. He finished ninth of the 33 starters in 2015 and in 2018 was on the podium with a second-place finish in AP. Harrington is one of the original instructors at the Mid-Ohio school, a position he still holds today (August 2022).

After retiring from active driving, Harrington has achieved success in his driver coaching business, including coaching Highcroft Racing factory Acura team Championship winning owner-driver Duncan Dayton and Mike Miserandino, who has won four national championships in a row. In 2017, two of his customers won again at the SCCA Runoffs, Mike Miserandino won his fifth National title with Scott's coaching and Max Gee won his first with Scott on board, coaching him to his first national championship. His latest driver, Jacob Abel, won two of the three F3 Americas races at the Road Atlanta round. He also competes in a number of vintage endurance races every year. In 2014 his vintage coaching customer Bill Abel won a national championship at the SVRA National Championship at the Circuit of the Americas. In addition to his testing and training work, Harrington does promotional and testing work for various manufacturers.

Harrington currently lives in Indianapolis with his wife Marsie and his young son.

== Racing record ==
=== SCCA National Championship Runoffs ===
Year	Track	Car	Engine	Class	Finish	Start	Status
1985	Road Atlanta	Spec Racer	Renault	Sports Renault	3	2	Running
1986	Road Atlanta	Spec Racer	Renault	Sports Renault			DNS
1986	Road Atlanta	Swift DB2	Ford	Sports 2000	2	2	Running

=== American open-wheel racing results ===
==== CART Series ====
(key) (Races in bold indicate pole position)

Year	Team	Chassis	Engine	1	2	3	4	5	6	7	8	9	10	11	12	13	14	15	Rank	Points	Ref
1989	U.S. Engineering	Lola T8700	Chevrolet 265A V8 t	PHX	LBH	INDY; DNQ	MIL	DET	POR	CLE	MEA	TOR	MCH	POC	MDO	ROA; 16	NAZ	LAG; DNQ	45th	0	

==== IndyCar Series ====
Year	Team	Chassis	No.	Engine	1	2	3	4	5	6	7	8	9	10	11	12	13	14	15	Rank	Points	Ref
1996	Della Penna Motorsports	Reynard 95i	44	Ford XB V8 t	WDW	PHX	INDY; 15													31st	20	
1996–97	Johansson Motorsports	G-Force GF01	36	Infiniti V8	NHM	LVS	WDW	PHX	INDY; DNQ	TXS	PPIR	CLT	NH2	LV2						NC	0	
1998	LP Racing	Dallara IR8	66	Oldsmobile	WDW	PHX	INDY; DNQ	TXS	NHS											39th	8	
1998	Riley & Scott Cars	Riley & Scott Mk V	15	Oldsmobile						DOV; 22	CLT	PPIR	ATL	TXS	LSV					39th	8	
1999	Harrington Motorsports	Dallara	66	Nissan	WDW; 25	PHX; 5	CLT; C	INDY; DNQ	TXS; DNS	PPIR; 19	ATL; 15	DOV; 6	PPIR; 6	LSV; 14	TXS; 6					14th	165	
2000	Nienhouse Racing	G-Force	17	Oldsmobile	WDW	PHX	LSV; 23	INDY; DNQ	TXS	PPIR										35th	17	
2000	Mid America Motorsports	Dallara	43	Oldsmobile							ATL; 20	DOV	PPIR							35th	17	
2002	Brayton Racing	Dallara	37	Chevrolet	MIA	PHX	FON	NAZ	INDY; DNQ	TXS	PPIR	RIR	KAN	NSH	MIS; 21	KTY	GAT	CHI	TXS	47th	9	

==== Indianapolis 500 ====
Year	Chassis	Engine	Start	Finish
1989	Lola	Cosworth	DNQ	
1996	Lola	Ford-Cosworth	32	15
1997	G-Force	Oldsmobile	DNQ	
1998	Dallara	Oldsmobile	DNQ	
1999	Dallara	Infiniti	DNQ	
2000	Dallara	Oldsmobile	DNQ	
2002	Dallara	Chevrolet	DNQ	

Sporting positions
Preceded by Robby Unser	IndyCar Series; Rookie of the Year; 1999	Succeeded by Airton Daré
