= John de Vries (racing driver) =

Australian racing driver

John David de Vries (born 3 April 1966, New South Wales, Australia) is a former driver in the Indy Racing League and Australian Formula Holden. He raced in the 2002 IRL season, where he began the season with Brayton Racing. De Vries competed in the first three races, and arrived but withdrew from the Nazareth Speedway race. He attempted to qualify for the 2002 Indianapolis 500, but was not among the 33 drivers who made the field. He returned after the Indianapolis 500 to compete in the Chevy 500 at Texas Motor Speedway and logged his best career IRL finish, an eleventh place, in what would be his final IRL race. Previously, de Vries had spent four years in Formula Holden and the Australian Formula Ford Championship.

De Vries spent his youth in Newport Beach, California. Prior to beginning his racing career, he owned several Subway restaurants in California, the first of which was in Corona del Mar. While in Australia for business reasons, he developed an interest in racing.

== Racing record ==
=== Career summary ===
Season	Series	Position	Car	Team
1998	Australian Drivers' Championship	6th	Reynard 91D Holden	
2002	Indy Racing League	33rd	Dallara IR2 Chevrolet	Brayton Racing; PDM Racing

=== American Open-Wheel ===
(key)

==== IndyCar ====
Year	Team	1	2	3	4	5	6	7	8	9	10	11	12	13	14	15	Rank	Points	Ref
2002	Brayton Racing	HMS; 17	PHX; 22	FON; 23	NZR; Wth	INDY; DNQ											33rd	53	
2002	PDM Racing						TXS; 11	PPIR	RIR	KAN	NSH	MIS	KTY	STL	CHI	TX2	33rd	53	
