= Kentucky Speedway =

Motorsport track in the United States

- Tri-Oval (2000–present)
- Location: 1 Speedway Drive; Sparta, Kentucky, United States
- Coordinates: 38°42′34.70″N 84°54′58.46″W
- Capacity: 87,000
- Owner: Speedway Motorsports (2009–present); Jerry Carroll (1998–2008)
- Broke ground: 18 July 1998; 28 years ago
- Opened: 16 June 2000; 26 years ago
- Construction cost: US$153 million
- Major events: Former: NASCAR Cup Series; Quaker State 400 (2011–2020); NASCAR Xfinity Series; Alsco 300 (2001–2020); Shady Rays 300 (2012–2017, 2020); NASCAR Craftsman Truck Series; Buckle Up in Your Truck 225 (2011–2020); Kentucky 201 (2000–2012); IndyCar Series; Kentucky Indy 300 (2000–2011)
- Website: kentuckyspeedway.com Archived September 28, 2020, at the Wayback Machine

Tri-Oval (2000–present)
- Surface: Asphalt
- Length: 1.500 mi (2.414 km)
- Turns: 4
- Banking: Turns 1 and 2: 17° Turns 3 and 4: 14° Frontstretch: 10° Backstretch: 4°
- Race lap record: 0:24.0967 ( (South Africa) Tomas Scheckter, Dallara IR-00, 2002, IndyCar)

Kentucky Speedway is an inactive 1.5 mi (2.4 km) tri-oval intermediate speedway in Sparta, Kentucky, United States. It has hosted various major races throughout its existence, including NASCAR and IndyCar races. The track is owned by Speedway Motorsports, LLC (SMI) and is currently used for weekend track rental. The speedway had a grandstand capacity of 87,000 as of 2020.

In the 1990s, then-Turfway Park owner Jerry Carroll sought new profitable ventures after Turfway Park's decline, deciding to build a modern auto racing facility. Construction started in July 1998 and opened nearly two years later, with an ultimate goal of securing a NASCAR Cup Series race weekend in the near future. However, under Carroll's tenure, a Cup Series date was not given. After a change in ownership to Bruton Smith in 2008, the track gained a Cup Series date in 2011. However, after an inaugural Cup Series weekend plagued by traffic issues and lackluster revenue throughout the following decade, the facility was dropped from the NASCAR schedule starting in 2021 and has since been turned into a multi-use rental complex.

== Description ==
=== Configuration ===
The speedway in its current form is measured at 1.5 miles (2.4 km), with 17 degrees of banking in the first two turns, 14 degrees in the last two turns, 10 degrees on the track's frontstretch, and four degrees on the track's backstretch. Varying sanctioning bodies have disputed the length of the track; NASCAR's official measurement is at 1.5 miles, while IndyCar used a length of 1.48 miles (2.38 km).

=== Amenities ===
Kentucky Speedway is located at an intersection between Interstate 71 and Kentucky Route 35. As of 2019, the facility has a grandstand capacity of 87,000 according to the Lexington Herald-Leader, down from its peak of 106,000 in the 2010s. In total, the facility covers approximately 1,000 acres (400 ha) of land.

== Track history ==
=== Planning and construction ===
In April 1997, Turfway Park owner Jerry Carroll faced declining attendance and betting at the horse racing facility. Seeking new ventures, he visited the newly built Texas Motor Speedway and began exploring the feasibility of building a NASCAR-style superspeedway in Northern Kentucky. According to The Cincinnati Enquirer, the study was expected to last 3–4 months. On January 8, 1998, Carroll announced plans to build a $132 million, 1.5 mi (2.4 km) track with 60,000 seats on 1,000 acres in Gallatin County, Kentucky. Backed by four business partners, he aimed to open the track in fall 1999, begin hosting events in 2000, and eventually expand to 180,000 seats. The project came amid a boom in stock car racing, with several new tracks hoping to secure a NASCAR Cup Series weekend. Carroll expressed hopes of landing a Cup Series date by 2003, starting by relocating a NASCAR Truck Series race from Louisville Motor Speedway, which he had acquired.

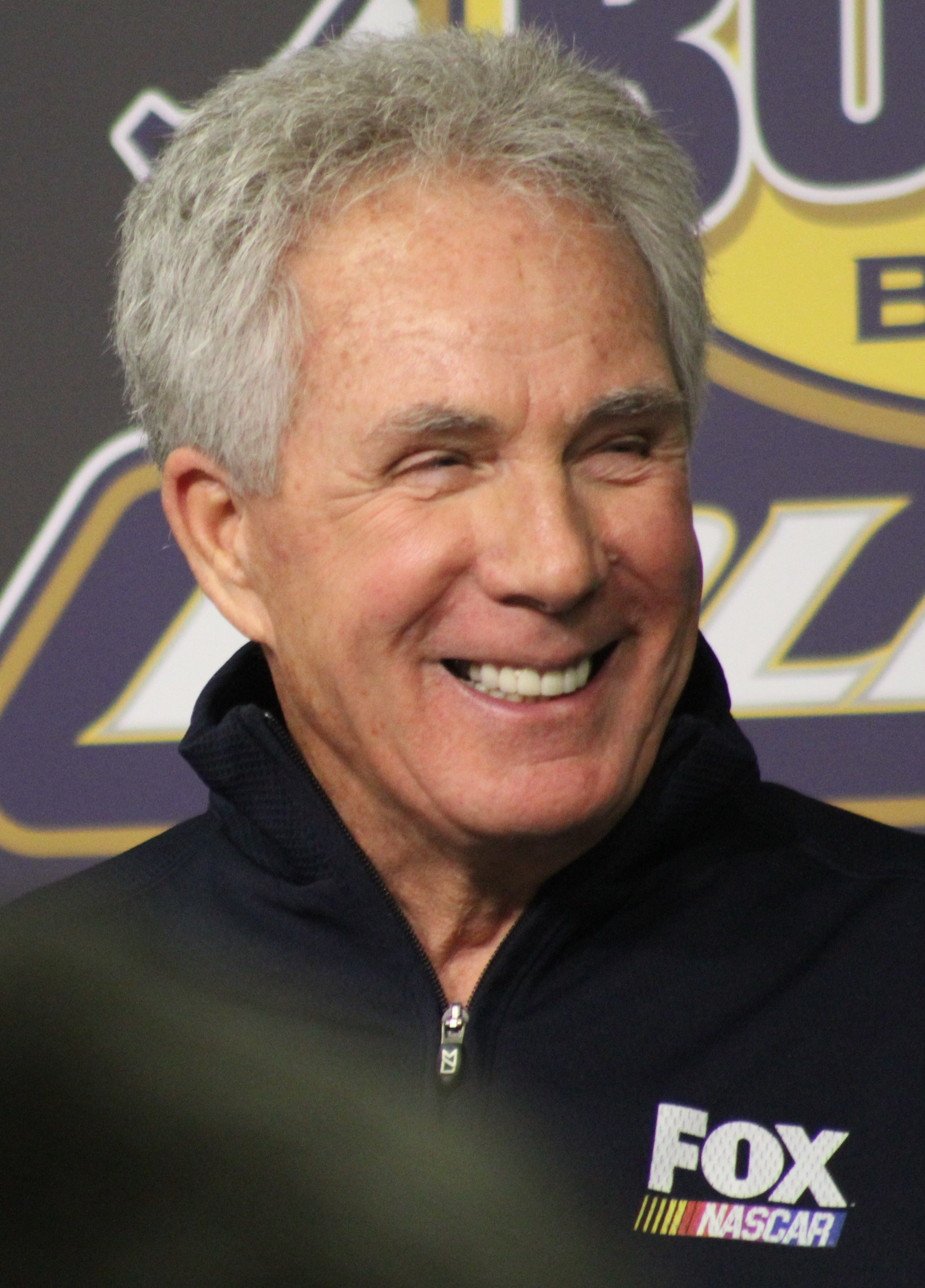
Longtime NASCAR driver and Kentucky native Darrell Waltrip was a track advisor during the construction of Kentucky Speedway.

By February 1998, Carroll announced an optimistic groundbreaking date of August 1. He expressed interest in hosting Indy Racing League (IRL), Championship Auto Racing Teams (CART), and NASCAR Busch Series events. However, IRL president Tony George stated the league had no plans to race there. Carroll, in contrast, praised NASCAR and its president Bill France Jr. as "very loyal" and moved the groundbreaking date up to July 1. A final date of July 18 was set, with ceremonial events held at Turfway Park for public convenience. Construction began August 1. By then, the project budget had grown to $152 million, and the facility was officially named Kentucky Speedway. Within the first month, about 1,500 personal seat licenses were sold. By year's end, demand for luxury suites prompted an increase from the planned 23 to at least 50. On the advice of track consultant Darrell Waltrip, the banking was adjusted to 14 degrees in the turns and 12 degrees on the straightaways. In February 1999, the track was annexed into Sparta, Kentucky. That same month, Carroll sold his stake in Turfway Park, citing frustration with its decline and a desire to focus on the Speedway. Soon after, Cintas, Ford Motor Company, and Budweiser signed on as corporate sponsors.

In June, Kentucky Speedway announced its first scheduled event: an Automobile Racing Club of America (ARCA) race planned for June 2000. By July, an IRL race was considered "highly probable," and by September, a 300 mi (480 km) event was confirmed for August 2000. In October, ARCA driver Bill Baird completed the first test laps, calling the track "as smooth as a baby's bottom." On November 4, a NASCAR Truck Series race was announced for June 17, 2000, and initial seating was increased to 70,000. A NASCAR Slim Jim All Pro Series race was added for the day before the Truck event. IndyCar driver Greg Ray also conducted test runs that month, and Mark Cassis was named general manager. By early 2000, 70% of the facility was complete. In February, NASCAR indicated the track was not likely to land a Cup Series race but was Busch Series–ready. After complaints during a Truck Series test in May, the surface was repaved by month's end. For its inaugural race weekend, the facility boasted seating for 65,989, 23,000 parking spaces, 104 infield garage spots, and two Outback Steakhouse restaurants—earning praise from drivers and officials alike.

=== Early years ===
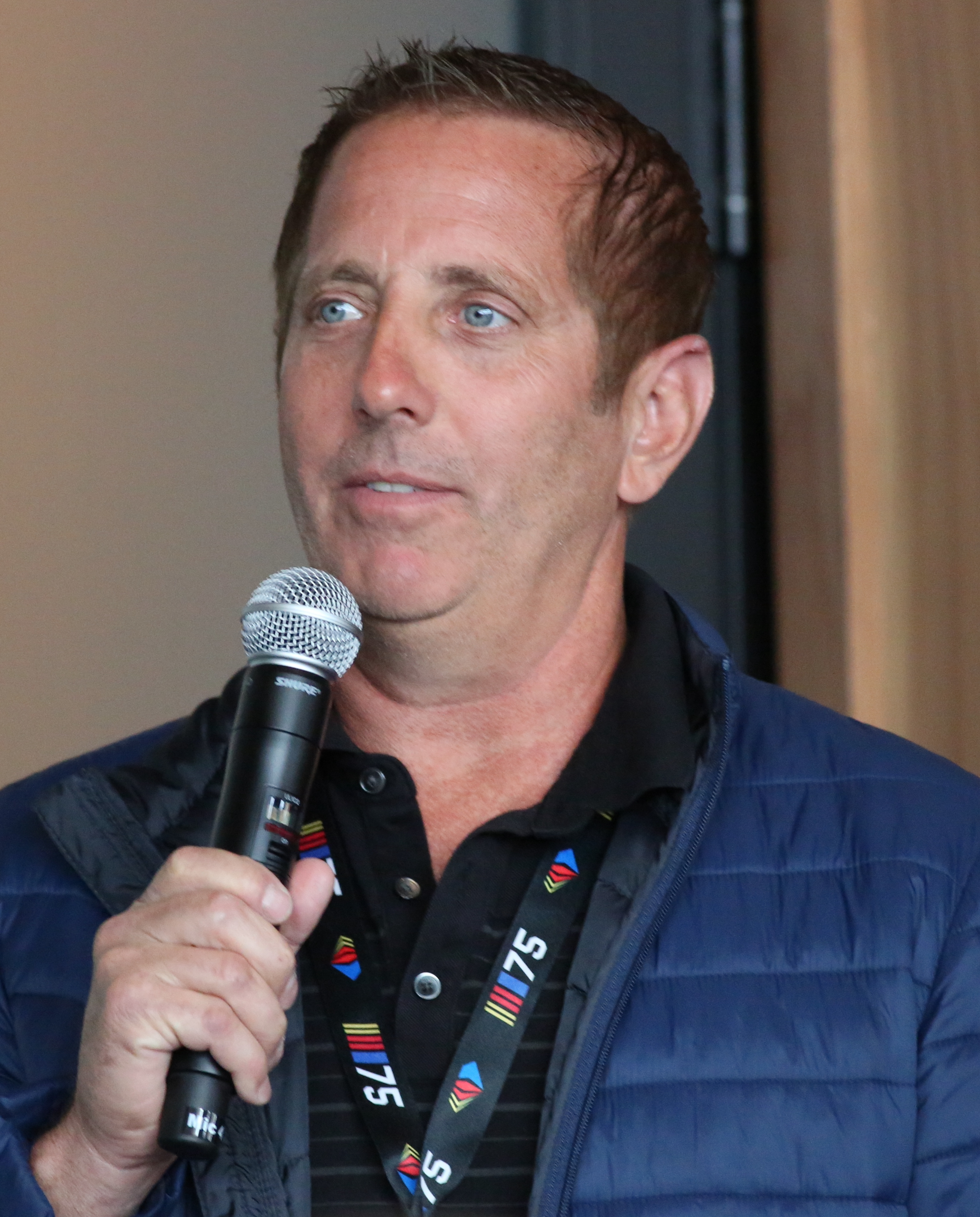
Greg Biffle (pictured in 2023) won the first major race at Kentucky Speedway.

Kentucky Speedway opened on June 16, 2000, with Billy Bigley winning the facility's first event in front of 36,210 fans. The next day's Truck Series race, delayed by heavy rain, drew a near sell-out crowd, with Greg Biffle taking the win. Due to the rain, muddy parking lots forced some spectators to be turned away, causing a 14 miles (23 km) traffic jam on I-71. In response, the track added 50,000 tons of gravel and created a 10,000-car emergency lot. In August 2000, Kentucky was awarded an annual NASCAR Busch Series race, with Kevin Harvick winning the inaugural event on June 16, 2001. The next year, actor and IndyCar hopeful Jason Priestley suffered serious injuries in a 180 mph (290 km/h) crash during a test session. Speedway officials applied for a Cup Series date beginning in 2002, but NASCAR declined, saying it did not align with their expansion plans. Despite expectations, no Cup races were scheduled for 2003 or 2004.

==== Antitrust lawsuit against NASCAR and ISC ====
By June 2005, Carroll, growing frustrated at the track's lack of a Cup Series race, stating that he would seek out more aggressive tactics to gain one, including the possibility of an antitrust lawsuit. On July 13, a lawsuit was officially filed against NASCAR and the International Speedway Corporation (ISC), with the speedway seeking out "more than $400 million in damages" and a Cup Series race. After proceedings began in December, NASCAR and ISC argued for the case to be heard in Florida, where both companies were headquartered, instead of Kentucky; the proposal was dismissed by United States district judge William Bertelsman, eventually ordering a one-year period of discovery for both parties set to end on February 1, 2007. Seen as a risky endeavor due to the possibility of the removal of its Busch Series date, by 2006, with the exception of its Busch Series race, all major series races at the track oversaw steep attendance declines. In April 2007, Kentucky Speedway amended their lawsuit, no longer demanding a Cup Series race; instead, they called for the France family, owner of both NASCAR and ISC, to give up ownership of one of either of the two companies. Kentucky Speedway officials also stated that NASCAR and ISC had pressured numerous owners of other tracks to sell to them only; a claim NASCAR denied. After a failed mediation in June, NASCAR asked Bertelsman to throw out the lawsuit on the basis that the "Kentucky Speedway has not come close to showing evidence supporting its allegations of a conspiracy to limit its ability to obtain an elite Nextel Cup Series race" in September; the request was accepted by Bertelsman on January 7, 2008. Kentucky Speedway's lawyer Stan Chesley proceeded to file an appeal four days later.

=== Bruton Smith's purchase, Mark Simendinger era ===
On May 22, 2008, The Cincinnati Enquirer reported that a press conference had been scheduled with Speedway Motorsports' (SMI) Bruton Smith regarding a potential partnership with the track or its selling. The purchase of the facility was confirmed by Smith that day for $78.3 million, with SMI buying the track for $15 million and assuming the rest in debt. With Smith purchasing the track, he aimed to add approximately 50,000 seats, additional bathrooms, increased parking space, and a renovated garage area upon confirmation of a Cup Series date. Smith later stated that he hoped that he could negotiate a Cup Series race for the facility in 2009; NASCAR later dispelled the comment, with a NASCAR spokesman stating that "we don't see any possibility of there being a Sprint Cup Series race in Kentucky in 2009." Although Smith sought to end the appeal, Carroll refused to budge, stating that "We are very, very adamant to the fact that we think we have a good lawsuit... What matters is the even playing field." The purchase was officially finalized on December 31; soon after, general manager Mark Cassis resigned from his position as the track's general manager. In February, SMI sought to acquire a tax break covering portions of renovation costs was proposed in February in the Kentucky General Assembly; it was approved by Kentucky Governor Steve Beshear four months later. By April, Mark Simendinger replaced Cassis as the general manager of the facility. That same month, the first phase of a planned $75 million in renovations begun in April, focusing on new access roads and increased camping spots.

Aggressive, renewed calls for all original investors of the facility to end the appeal by Smith came in May. In response to Smith's calls, Richard Duchossois, one of the original investors, stated that all five investors were agreed in continuing the appeal process, adding that he thought that Smith's plea to end the appeal was "NASCAR's way of trying a force a settlement." Smith later claimed that as long as the lawsuit occurred, NASCAR would not consider giving the facility a Cup Series date. By June, Smith conceded most hopes of hosting a Cup Series race in 2010, instead hoping to obtain one in 2011. Arguments for the appeal started in the United States Court of Appeals for the Sixth Circuit in July 30; on December 11, the court upheld Bertelsman's ruling in favor of NASCAR. A week later, Carroll officially dropped his lawsuit against NASCAR and ISC, allowing the facility to begin the eligibility process to obtain a Cup Series date. However, 11 days after, Duchossois sued Carroll, claiming that the appeal could not be dropped until at least 75% of the track's ownership agreed to it. The Sixth Circuit Appeals Court denied Duchossois' request for a rehearing in February, and although a trial date was scheduled for May 7, the two came to a settlement by April 30, formally ending the six-year lawsuit.

After showing some initial doubt, Smith submitted an official bid for a Cup Series date for 2011 in the beginning of July. A "major" press conference was announced later that month to take place on August 10; The Charlotte Observer reported that the press conference was to announce a new Cup Series date at the facility. On August 10, a Cup Series date was officially confirmed, with Smith planning to invest $90–100 million towards 50,000 additional seats, additional bathrooms and elevators, and the rezoning for 200 more acres of camping. By November, new spectator towers, the Kentucky and Ohio towers that contained 19,000 seats each, were being built to increase grandstand capacity to 106,000. In the months heading into the Cup Series race, Smith stated concerns of potential traffic issues, stating in the Lexington Herald-Leader, "Getting the people in here and out is going to be a tall order for us... It’s going to take a lot of hard work and planning to get that done." He later added that Interstate 71 was "the worst interstate highway that I have ever driven on in my life... That highway should have been rebuilt five years ago because it's so antiquated and falling apart." By the start of the race weekend, approximately $70 million of renovations were made, including the move of the track's pit road 200 feet closer to the frontstretch and the addition of 3,000 campsite spots.

==== First NASCAR Cup Series race, subsequent traffic nightmare ====
On July 9, 2011, the first ever NASCAR Cup Series race ran at the facility, with Kyle Busch winning the event. Like the track's first ever race, the race was mired by heavy traffic jams. Reports of "total gridlock" stack-ups leaving fans waiting for six hours were reported, with traffic being reported in cities as far as Carrollton. By 9:30 PM EST, fans were being turned away; according to Bruton Smith, by the end of the race, approximately 20,000 fans were turned away from entering. Different reasons were given on the cause of the traffic jam; Smith again blamed Interstate 71 and its lack of lanes, while Kentucky Governor Steve Beshear blamed a shortage of parking spaces; at the time, the facility had 33,000 parking spaces. To alleviate the problem, SMI announced to spend $11 million worth of renovations, including the purchase of 219 acres (89 ha) of land and the construction of a new pedestrian walkway. An exit ramp of Interstate 71 and parts of Kentucky Route 35 were also widened. The renovations proved to be a success; according to multiple outlets, no major traffic jams were reported.

==== Following years, repave ====
By 2014, the track's surface gained a reputation for a rough and bumpy surface. Although the surface received positive reactions along with pleas from several NASCAR drivers to not repave the track, track officials opted to grind down a patch of track in the track's fourth turn after complaints of a dip that was "beyond the level of tolerance". Attendance also saw a major decrease over a three-year period, fueling speculation of the move of the facility's Cup Series date to another SMI-owned track. That same year, the track oversaw its first automobile-related fatality when Stephen Cox crashed his car during a Rusty Wallace Racing Experience session. Despite plans to not repave the surface in 2015, problems arose when water leaked from the track surface during a rain delay in July. In response, officials announced in January 2016 a repave and modifications to the track's first two turns; they were changed to have 17 degrees of banking from 14 degrees and were narrowed from 74 feet to 56 feet. The repave drew mixed reactions, with Simendinger opting to add an additional asphalt layer to the track's surface because it "did not meet specifications". Within the next three years, the facility decreased grandstand capacity twice; one in 2017 that removed 20,000 seats to decrease capacity to 86,000, and one in 2019 that decreased capacity to 69,000. By 2020, according to Mark Story of the Lexington Herald-Leader, capacity was down to "some 87,000".

=== Stoppage of racing, transition to storage and parking lot ===
On September 29, 2020, NASCAR officially confirmed to The Athletic that the organization would not return to Kentucky Speedway for their 2021 season in any capacity. In a Cincinnati Enquirer analysis piece by Jason Hoffman, the decision was due to the track "succumb[ing] to its inability to bring in enough revenue for its parent company." In response to the news, Simendinger stated that the facility would "evolve into a multi-use rental complex... we have the potential to host special events, commercial television production, music festivals, other racing series and stand-alone RV rallies and camping events." In December of that year, Simendinger resigned from his position, leaving SMI. In May 2021, amidst a global semiconductor shortage, the track was used by the Ford Motor Company to store thousands of pickup trucks waiting for computer chips. Later deals with Amazon were made within the year. By 2022, the only event held at the speedway was an EDM music festival. By 2024, although calls were made to return to the track by numerous personalities, such as NASCAR driver Denny Hamlin and Gallatin County judge Ryan Morris, the track was viewed as dilapidated, needing major renovations and government subsidies, with the state of Kentucky not willing to contribute. Kentucky Lantern writer Tim Sullivan stated that "the state appears conspicuously short of the political will and financial muscle necessary to underwrite that undertaking... Kentucky lags so far behind that it risks being lapped."

== Events ==
=== Racing ===
==== NASCAR ====
The facility hosted one NASCAR weekend annually, featuring the NASCAR Craftsman Truck Series' Buckle Up in Your Truck 225 and Kentucky 201 since 2000 and the NASCAR Xfinity Series' Alsco 300 since 2001. From 2012 to 2017, it also hosted a second Xfinity Series race, the Shady Rays 200, which was removed in 2018 in favor of a race at Las Vegas Motor Speedway but returned as a one-off event in 2020.

In 2011, the track began hosting the NASCAR Cup Series with the Quaker State 400, held annually in late June or July, starting with its inaugural race on July 9, 2011. However, since 2021, all three top NASCAR series have ceased racing at the facility.

==== IndyCar Series ====
From 2000 to 2011, IndyCar held the Kentucky Indy 300, an annual 300 mi (480 km) IndyCar Series event. The first iteration was held on August 27, 2000, with Buddy Lazier winning the event. The event ran continuously until 2011, when IndyCar announced in December of that year that the series would not be returning to the track in 2012.

=== Music festivals ===
Kentucky Speedway has held numerous music festivals. In July 2000, the facility held its first concert as part of Metallica's Summer Sanitarium Tour, with approximately 50,000 fans attending. A year later, the facility held a stop of the traveling Warped Tour. From 2003 to 2004, the Meijer Country Stampede was held at the track. In May 2015, a festival headlined by Kings of Leon, Miranda Lambert, and Green Day was announced for August of that year; however, a month before the festival, organizers cancelled it due to a lack of ticket sales. In August 2022, the facility hosted the Interstellar Music Festival, an EDM music festival.

== Lap records ==
As of July 2019, the fastest official race lap records at Kentucky Speedway are listed as:

Category	Time	Driver	Vehicle	Event
Tri-Oval (2000–present): 1.500 mi (2.414 km)
Indy Racing League	0:24.0967	Tomas Scheckter	Dallara IR-00	2002 Belterra Casino Indy 300
Indy Pro Series	0:27.668	Alex Lloyd	Dallara IR-00	2007 Kentucky 100
NASCAR Cup	0:29.444	Martin Truex Jr.	Toyota Camry NASCAR	2018 Quaker State 400
NASCAR Xfinity	0:29.971	John Hunter Nemechek	Chevrolet Camaro SS	2018 Alsco 300
NASCAR Truck	0:30.116	Grant Enfinger	Ford F-150 NASCAR	2019 Buckle Up in Your Truck 225
