= Airton Daré =

Brazilian racing driver (born 1978)

- Nationality: (Brazil) Brazilian
- Born: 9 February 1978 (age 48); Bauru, Brazil

IndyCar Series career
- 39 races run over 5 years
- Teams: TeamXtreme; A. J. Foyt Enterprises; Sam Schmidt Motorsports
- Best finish: 9th (2002)
- First race: 2000 Delphi Indy 200 (Walt Disney World)
- Last race: 2006 Indianapolis 500 (Indianapolis)
- First win: 2002 Ameristar Casino Indy 200 (Kansas)
- Last win: 2002 Ameristar Casino Indy 200 (Kansas)
Wins	Podiums	Poles
1	3	0

Airton Daré (born 9 February 1978 in Bauru, Brazil) is a Brazilian race car driver who has competed in the Indy Racing League. Daré began his racing career in jet ski racing in 1990. He won six Brazilian championships, one South American championship and came fourth in the world championship. In 1995, he switched to motorsports, participating in Brazilian Formula Fiat. In 1997, he competed in the Indy Lights and during three years in this category, he managed one victory in Detroit in 1998 and one in Nazareth in 1999, and his best championship result was a sixth place in 1998. He made his first IRL start in 2000 and was a long-time driver for A. J. Foyt Enterprises. Daré has a single IRL race win which he captured for Foyt in 2002 at Kansas Speedway. He was also the 2000 IRL Rookie of the Year. Daré has five starts in the Indianapolis 500 with a best finish of eighth in 2001. His best IRL points finish is ninth in 2002. He drove in the 2006 Indianapolis 500 for Sam Schmidt Motorsports, finishing in eighteenth position. He also races stock cars and motocross in his native Brazil.

== Racing record ==
=== American open-wheel racing results ===
(key)

==== Indy Lights results ====
(key)

Year	Team	1	2	3	4	5	6	7	8	9	10	11	12	13	14	Rank	Points	Ref
1997	Brian Stewart Racing	MIA; 11	LBH; 6	NAZ; 8	SAV; 8	STL; 6	MIL; 11	DET; 13	POR; 20	TOR; 9	TRO; 9	VAN; 7	LS; 11	FON; 8		10th	51	
1998	Tasman Motorsports	MIA; 17	LBH; 9	NAZ; 5	STL; 9	MIL; 8	DET; 1	POR; 4	CLE; 13	TOR; 8	MIS; 19	TRO; 21	VAN; 3	LS; 11	FON; 15	6th	78	
1999	Forsythe Championship Racing	MIA; 2	LBH; 17	NAZ; 1	MIL; 7	POR; 5	CLE; 5	TOR; 19	MIS; 15	DET; 15	CHI; 18	LS; 12	FON; 8			10th	71	

==== IndyCar Series ====
Year	Team	1	2	3	4	5	6	7	8	9	10	11	12	13	14	15	16	Rank	Points	Ref
2000	Team Xtreme	WDW; 11	PHX; 22	LVS; 14	INDY; 25	TXS; 10	PPIR; 2	ATL; 25	KTY; 19	TX2; 12								16th	142	
2001	Team Xtreme	PHX; 13	HMS; 23	ATL; 9	INDY; 8	TXS; 19	PPIR; 5	RIR; 15	KAN; 6	NSH; 17	KTY; 20	STL; 9	CHI; 19	TX2; 7				10th	239	
2002	A. J. Foyt Enterprises	HMS; 10	PHX; 12	FON; 13	NZR; 11	INDY; 13	TXS; 3	PPIR; 9	RIR; 6	KAN; 1	NSH; 17	MIS; 23	KTY; 23	STL; 11	CHI; 16	TX2; 12		9th	304	
2003	A. J. Foyt Enterprises	HMS	PHX	MOT	INDY; 24	TXS; DNS	PPIR	RIR	KAN	NSH	MIS	STL	KTY	NZR	CHI	FON	TX2	34th	6	
2006	Sam Schmidt Motorsports	HMS	STP	MOT	INDY; 18	WGL	TXS	RIR	KAN	NSH	MIL	MIS	KTY	SNM	CHI			31st	12	

==== Indianapolis 500 results ====
Year	Chassis	Engine	Start	Finish	Team
2000	G-Force	Oldsmobile	21	25	Team Xtreme
2001	G-Force	Oldsmobile	30	8	Team Xtreme
2002	Dallara	Chevrolet	30	13	A. J. Foyt Enterprises
2003	G-Force	Toyota	33	24	A. J. Foyt Enterprises
2006	Panoz	Honda	29	18	Sam Schmidt Motorsports

Sporting positions
Preceded by Scott Harrington	IndyCar Series; Rookie of the Year; 2000	Succeeded by Felipe Giaffone
