= Brandon Erwin =

Brandon Erwin (born November 22, 1975, in Denton, Texas) is a racecar driver who has raced in stock car and sprint car events. In 2001, he competed in four Indy Racing League contests for McCormack Motorsports. In 2003, he competed in the Indy Pro Series, finishing eleventh in points with a best race result of third in his first race.

In 2005, Erwin drove a winged sprint car in Texas and surrounding states. His current hometown race track is the Devils Bowl Motor Speedway dirt track in Mesquite, Texas. He is currently working in law and real estate.

== Racing record ==
=== American Open Wheel ===
(key)

==== IndyCar results ====
Year	Team	1	2	3	4	5	6	7	8	9	10	11	12	13	Rank	Points	Ref
2001	McCormack Motorsports	PHX; 14	HMS; 17	ATL; 27	INDY; DNQ	TXS; 22	PPI	RIR	KAN	NSH	KTY	STL	CHI	TX2	30th	40	

==== Infiniti Pro Series ====
Year	Team	1	2	3	4	5	6	7	8	9	10	11	12	Rank	Points
2003	Sam Schmidt Motorsports	HMS; 3	PHX; 4	INDY; 11	PPIR; 11	KAN; 6	NSH; 10	MIS; 12	STL; 10	KTY; 9	CHI	FON	TXS	11th	213
