= Jeret Schroeder =

American racing driver

- Nationality: American
- Born: November 13, 1969 (age 56) Vineland, New Jersey, U.S.
- Retired: 2002

Indy Racing League IndyCar Series
- Years active: 1997, 1999-2002
- Teams: McCormack Motorsports; Cobb Racing; Tri-Star Racing; PDM Racing
- Starts: 20
- Wins: 0
- Poles: 0
- Best finish: 17th in 2000

Previous series
- 1996-1997: Toyota Atlantic

Championship titles
- 1995: U.S. F2000 National Championship

Jeret Schroeder (born November 13, 1969, Vineland, New Jersey, United States) is an American former driver in the Indy Racing League. He raced in the 1997 and 1999-2002 seasons with twenty career starts, including the 1999-2001 Indianapolis 500.

Schroeder's best career finish was fourth at the 2000 Vegas Indy 300 won by Al Unser Jr. at the Las Vegas Motor Speedway. In that same 2000 season, Schroeder led the rookie of the year standings until his car was struck by other drivers during the final two races to knock him out of the rookie points lead.

== Motorsports Career Results ==
=== SCCA National Championship Runoffs ===
Year	Track	Car	Engine	Class	Finish	Start	Status
1992	Road Atlanta	Swift DB1	Ford Kent	Formula Ford	7	5	Running
1994	Mid-Ohio	Swift	Ford	Formula Continental	5	8	Running

=== American Open-Wheel ===
(key) (Races in bold indicate pole position)

==== IndyCar ====
Year	Team	1	2	3	4	5	6	7	8	9	10	11	12	13	14	15	Rank	Points	Ref
1996-97	McCormack Motorsports	NWH	LSV	WDW; 14	PHX; 19	INDY	TXS	PPIR	CLT	NH2	LV2						**35th**	**37**	
1999	Cobb Racing	WDW	PHX	CLT	INDY; 15	TXS	PPI	ATL	DOV	PP2	LSV	TX2					**38th**	**15**	
2000	Tri-Star Motorsports	WDW; 19	PHX; 12	LSV; 4	INDY; 14	TXS; 21	PPI; 7	ATL; 24	KTY; 26	TX2; 16							**17th**	**136**	
2001	PDM Racing	PHX; 26	HMS; 14	ATL; 19	INDY; 20				KAN; 15	NSH	KTY	STL	CHI	TX2			22nd	77	
2001	Tri-Star Motorsports					TXS; 23	PPI	RIR; 16									22nd	77	
2002	PDM Racing	HMS	PHX	CAL; 27	NZR	INDY	TXS	PPI	RIR	KAN	NSH	MIS	KTY	STL	CHI	TX2	**49th**	**3**	

Years	Teams	Races	Poles	Wins	Podiums (Non-win)	Top 10s (Non-podium)	Indianapolis 500 Wins	Championships
5	4	20	0	0	0	2	0	0

==== Indy 500 results ====
Year	Chassis	Engine	Start	Finish	
1999	G-Force	Infiniti	21st	15th	Cobb
2000	Dallara	Oldsmobile	29th	14th	Tri-Star
2001	Dallara	Oldsmobile	23rd	20th	PDM
