= McCormack Motorsports =

McCormack Motorsports is a former Indy Racing League team owned by Dennis McCormack that operated from 1996 to 2001. Based in Avon, Indiana, the team debuted at the 1996 Indianapolis 500 with a car for Randy Tolsma, however, it failed to make the field. For the 1996–1997 season, the team used 3 different drivers. Raul Boesel drove the entire 1998 season for the team and finished 20th in points with a best finish of 8th. 1999 was another season of instability as the team saw 4 different drivers start a race for them and one other driver, Nick Firestone, fail to get his McCormack entry into the Indy 500. 2000 again saw 3 different drivers drive for the team and relative instability and lack of funding, along with two of its cars, this time driven by Ronnie Johncox and Robby Unser again fail to qualify for the Indy 500. This was largely due to a disastrous experiment with using the uncommon Riley & Scott chassis. The team also formed an alliance with the Byrd brothers of Byrd Motorsports and fielded the #30 car for a revolving door of drivers including Johncox, Jon Herb, and J. J. Yeley. 2001 was the team's final season. The team shut down after its car driven by Brandon Erwin failed to qualify for the Indy 500 and then the next week at the Casino Magic 500, where they were woefully off the pace. The team's best finish was a 5th place by Boesel at the 1999 Indy 200 at Walt Disney World Speedway.

== Drivers ==
- (Brazil) Raul Boesel (1998–1999)
- (United States) Brandon Erwin (2001)
- (United States) Robbie Groff (1997)
- (United States) Jon Herb (2000)*
- (United States) Ronnie Johncox (2000)*
- (United States) Jimmy Kite (1999)
- (United States) Willy T. Ribbs (1999)
- (United States) Jeret Schroeder (1997)
- (United States) Robby Unser (2000)
- (United States) Stan Wattles (1997)
- (United States) J. J. Yeley (2000)*

*indicates the driver was entered as Byrd-McCormack Motorsports

== Complete IRL IndyCar Series results ==
(key) (Results in bold indicate pole position; results in italics indicate fastest lap)

Year	Chassis	Engine	Drivers	No.	1	2	3	4	5	6	7	8	9	10	11	12	13
McCormack Motorsports
1996					WDW	PHX	INDY										
1996	Lola T93	Ford-Cosworth XB	(United States) Randy Tolsma **(R)**	24			DNQ										
1996–97					NHA	LSV	WDW	PHX	INDY	TXS	PPIR	CLT	NHA	LSV			
1996–97	Lola T94	Ford-Cosworth XB	(United States) Stan Wattles **(R)**	30	16	18											
1996–97	G-Force GF01	Oldsmobile Aurora V8	(United States) Jeret Schroeder **(R)**	30			14	19									
1996–97	G-Force GF01	Oldsmobile Aurora V8	(United States) Robbie Groff **(R)**	30					9	15	10	13	10	18			
1998					WDW	PHX	INDY	TXS	NHA	DOV	CLT	PPIR	ATL	TXS	LSV		
1998	G-Force GF01B	Oldsmobile Aurora V8	(Brazil) Raul Boesel	30	18	8	19	28	19	14	24	25	10	17	18		
1999					WDW	PHX	CLT	INDY	TXS	PPIR	ATL	DOV	PPIR	LSV	TXS		
1999	G-Force GF01B	Oldsmobile Aurora V8	(Brazil) Raul Boesel	30	5	19	C^{1}										
1999	G-Force GF01B	Oldsmobile Aurora V8	(United States) Jimmy Kite	30				24	25	15	9	16	8				
1999	G-Force GF01B	Oldsmobile Aurora V8	(United States) Willy T. Ribbs	30										26			
1999	G-Force GF01B	Oldsmobile Aurora V8	(United States) John Paul Jr.	30											18		
1999	G-Force GF01B	Oldsmobile Aurora V8	(United States) Nick Firestone	31/34				DNQ									
Byrd-McCormack Racing
2000					WDW	PHX	LVS	INDY	TXS	PPIR	ATL	KTY	TXS				
2000	G-Force GF01B; Riley & Scott Mk V	Oldsmobile Aurora V8	(United States) Jon Herb	30	22												
2000	G-Force GF01B; Riley & Scott Mk V	Oldsmobile Aurora V8	(United States) Ronnie Johncox	30		14	13	DNQ	DNS								
2000	G-Force GF01B; Riley & Scott Mk V	Oldsmobile Aurora V8	(United States) Robby Unser	30				DNQ	26	21							
2000	G-Force GF01B; Riley & Scott Mk V	Oldsmobile Aurora V8	(United States) J. J. Yeley	30							17	15	25				
McCormack Motorsports
2001					PHX	HMS	ATL	INDY	TXS	PPIR	RIR	KAN	NSH	KTY	GAT	CHI	TXS
2001	G-Force GF05B	Oldsmobile Aurora V8	(United States) Brandon Erwin **(R)**	30	14	17	27	DNQ	22								
2001	G-Force GF05B	Oldsmobile Aurora V8	(United States) Jimmy Kite	30				DNQ									

^{1} The 1999 VisionAire 500K at Charlotte was cancelled after 79 laps due to spectator fatalities.
