= Lee Brayton =

American open-wheel racing driver and team owner (1933–2022)

Lee E. Brayton (August 13, 1933 – April 30, 2022) was an American racing driver from Coldwater, Michigan. He competed in the USAC Championship Car series from 1972 to 1975, making 16 starts with the best finish of 10th three times (twice at Michigan International Speedway and once at Texas World Speedway). He attempted to qualify for the Indianapolis 500 in 1972, 1973, and 1974, but after missing the field his first year, was taken out of contention by practice crashes the following two years. His son, Scott Brayton, was a long-time CART and Indy Racing League driver, who was killed in a crash during a practice run after qualifying for the pole position for the 1996 Indy 500 race.

Brayton owned Brayton Engineering, an engineering firm that helped build the Buick V6 IndyCar engine as well as fielding a car in the CART series, primarily for his son Scott, from 1981 to 1986 and then fielded an Indy Racing League car in 2002. They entered two cars in the 2001 Indianapolis 500 for Memo Gidley and Steve Knapp but both missed the field; their single-car assault on the field in 2002 with John de Vries again failed. Their last IndyCar event came at the Michigan 400 in 2002 with Scott Harrington at the wheel.

Brayton died on April 30, 2022, at a nursing home in his hometown of Coldwater.

== Racing results ==
=== USAC Championship Car series ===
(key) (Races in bold indicate pole position)

Year	Team	1	2	3	4	5	6	7	8	9	10	11	12	13	14	15	16	Rank	Points
1972	Eisenhour-Brayton Racing Team	PHX	TRE	INDY; DNQ	MIL	MCH; 10	POC; DNQ	MIL; 17	ONT	TRE	PHX							38th	60
1973	Eisenhour-Brayton Racing Team	TWS; 10	TRE; 17	TRE; 12	INDY; DNQ	MIL; 15	POC	MCH	MIL	ONT	ONT	ONT; DNQ	MCH; 15	MCH; 10	TRE; 16	TWS; 12	PHX; 17	27th	133
1974	Eisenhour-Brayton Racing Team	ONT; 11	ONT	ONT; DNS	PHX	TRE		MIL	POC; 14	MCH; DNQ	MIL	MCH; 20	TRE	TRE	PHX			36th	20
1974	Webster Racing						INDY; DNQ											36th	20
1975	Eisenhour-Brayton Racing Team	ONT	ONT; 14	ONT; 22	PHX	TRE	INDY	MIL	POC	MCH	MIL	MCH	TRE	PHX				NC	0
