= G-Force GF05 =

American open-wheel race car

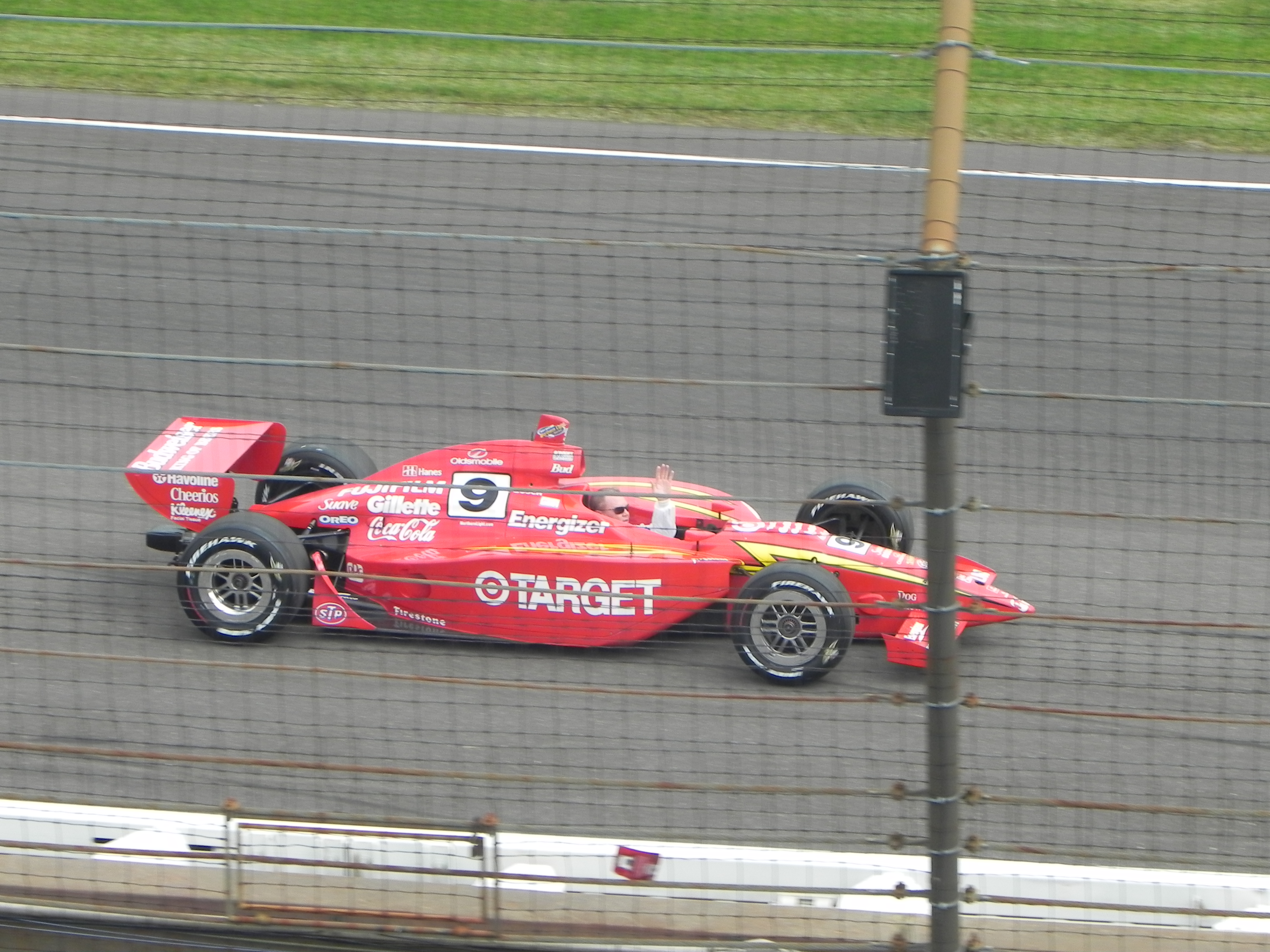
- Category: Indy Racing League
- Constructor: (United States) Élan Motorsport Technologies (United States) G-Force Technologies
- Designer: Paul Burgess
- Predecessor: G-Force GF01
- Successor: G-Force GF09

Technical specifications
- Chassis: Carbon fiber monocoque with honeycomb kevlar structure
- Suspension: Pushrod with multilink
- Length: 4,877 mm (192 in)
- Width: 1,968 mm (77 in) minimum 1,994 mm (79 in) maximum
- Height: 965 mm (38 in)
- Axle track: Front: 1,702–1,722 mm (67–68 in); Rear: 1,613 mm (64 in)
- Wheelbase: 3,048 mm (120 in), plus or minus 51.5 mm (2997-3100 mm (118-122 mm))
- Engine: Oldsmobile (2000-2001); Chevrolet (2002) 3.5–4.0 L (3,500–4,000 cc; 214–244 cu in) V8 90° naturally-aspirated, mid-engined, longitudinally-mounted
- Transmission: Xtrac #P295 6-speed sequential manual gearbox (2000-2002) Adjustable spool type
- Power: 650–700 hp (485–522 kW)
- Weight: 1,565 lb (710 kg) on short, intermediate speedway oval and Indianapolis 500; 1,640 lb (744 kg) on road and street courses Including driver, fuel and all lubricants and coolants
- Fuel: 100% fuel grade Ethanol
- Tyres: Firestone Firehawk dry slick and rain treaded tires O.Z. racing, BBS wheels

Competition history
- Debut: 2000 Delphi Indy 200
Races	Wins	Poles	F/Laps
37	9	0	0
- Constructors' Championships: 0
- Drivers' Championships: 0

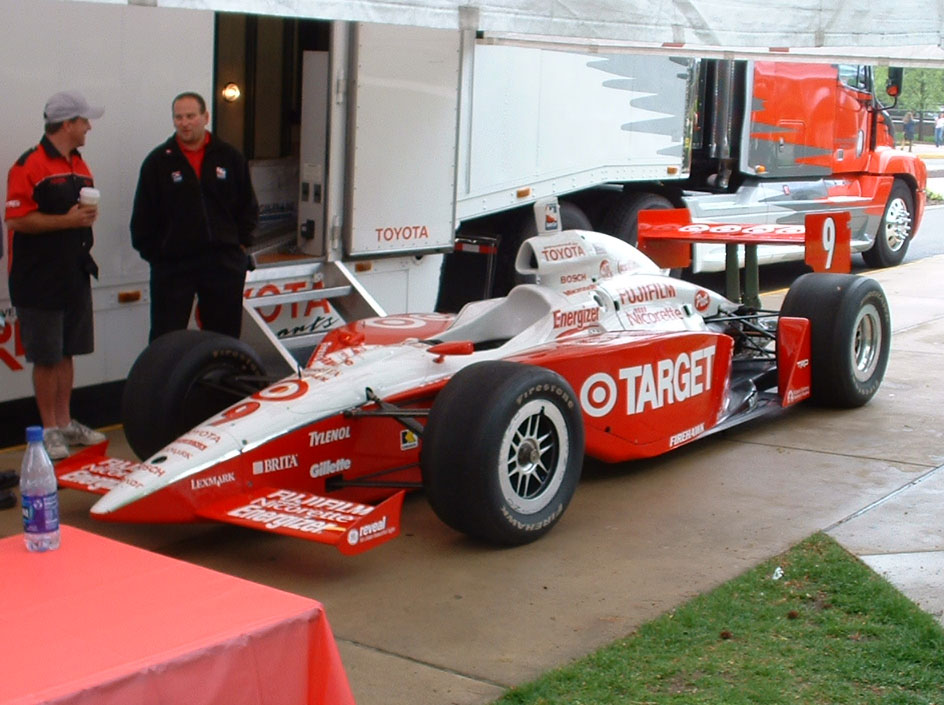
Target Chip Ganassi Racing Indy car

The G-Force GF05 is a racing car developed and produced by American manufacturer Élan Motorsport Technologies for Panoz, with original work having been performed by G-Force Technologies prior to its purchase by Panoz, for use in the Indy Racing League. G-Force was once again a constructor for the second generation of IRL cars. G-Force would famously again visit victory lane in the Indianapolis 500 in 2000 with Chip Ganassi Racing's Juan Pablo Montoya. Élan purchased G-Force in 2002, and the production of the chassis was moved to Braselton for its final season. The second-generation G-Force IRL chassis competed in the series from 2000 to 2002.
