= Dallara IR-00 =

Open-wheel formula racing car built by Dallara

Dallara IR-00 Dallara IR-01 Dallara IR-02
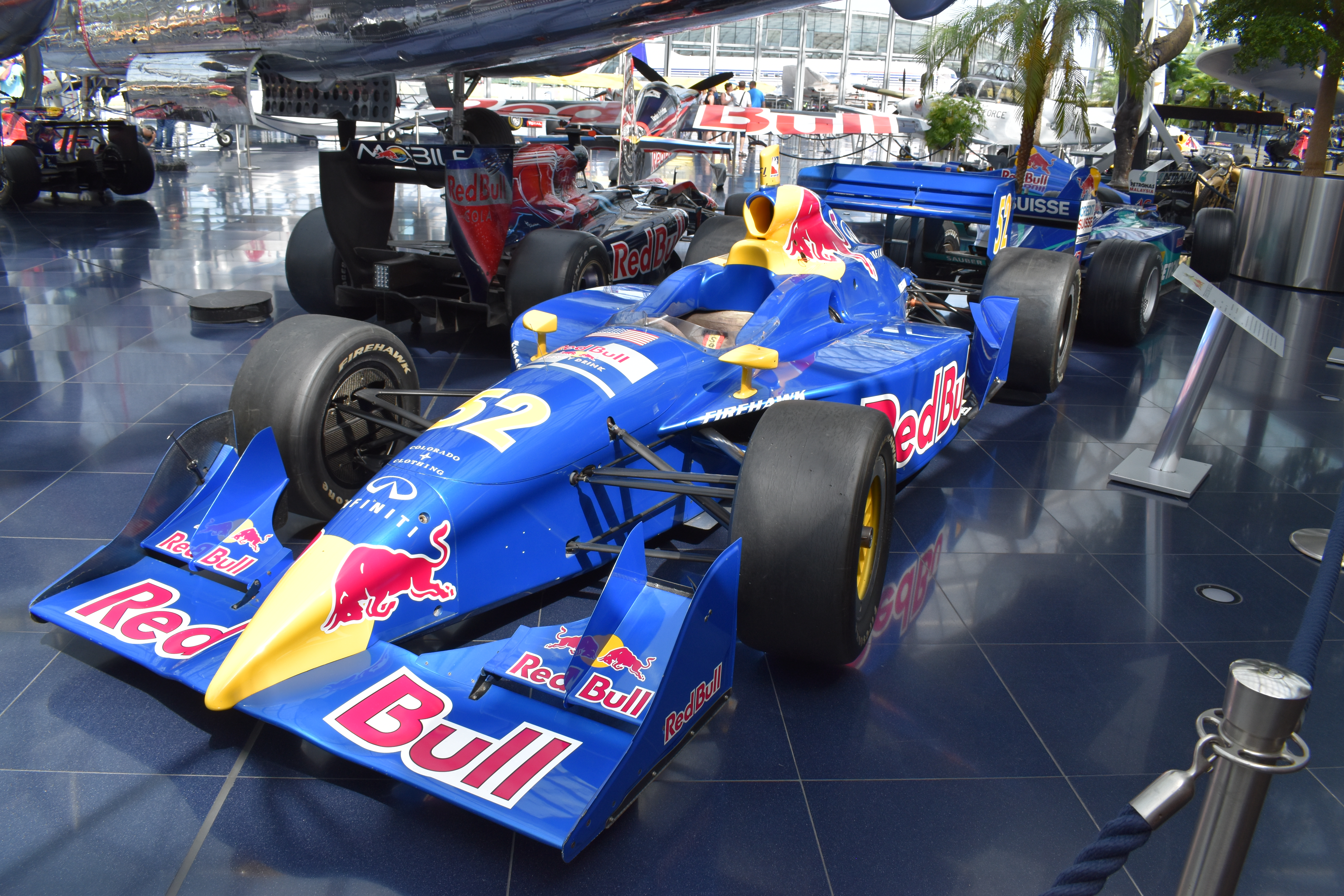
- Category: Indy Racing League
- Constructor: Dallara
- Predecessor: Dallara IR-7
- Successor: Dallara IR-03

Technical specifications
- Chassis: Carbon fiber monocoque with honeycomb structure
- Suspension (front): double wishbones, pull rod actuated coil springs over shock absorbers
- Suspension (rear): double wishbones, pull rod actuated coil springs over shock absorbers
- Length: 192–196 in (4,877–4,978 mm)
- Width: 77.5–78.5 in (1,968–1,994 mm) minimum (Road/Street)
- Wheelbase: 118–122 in (2,997–3,099 mm)
- Engine: Infiniti (2000-2002); Oldsmobile (2000-2002); Chevrolet (2002) 3.5 L (214 cu in) 90° N/A V8 DOHC with 4-stroke piston Otto cycle mid-engined, longitudinally-mounted
- Transmission: Xtrac 6-speed sequential
- Power: ~ 650 hp (485 kW); 300 lb⋅ft (410 N⋅m)
- Weight: 1,550 lb (703 kg)
- Fuel: 100% methanol
- Lubricants: Various per teams
- Tyres: Firestone Firehawk

Competition history
- Notable entrants: Team Penske; A. J. Foyt Enterprises
- Notable drivers: (Brazil) Gil de Ferran (Brazil) Hélio Castroneves
- Debut: 2000 Delphi Indy 200

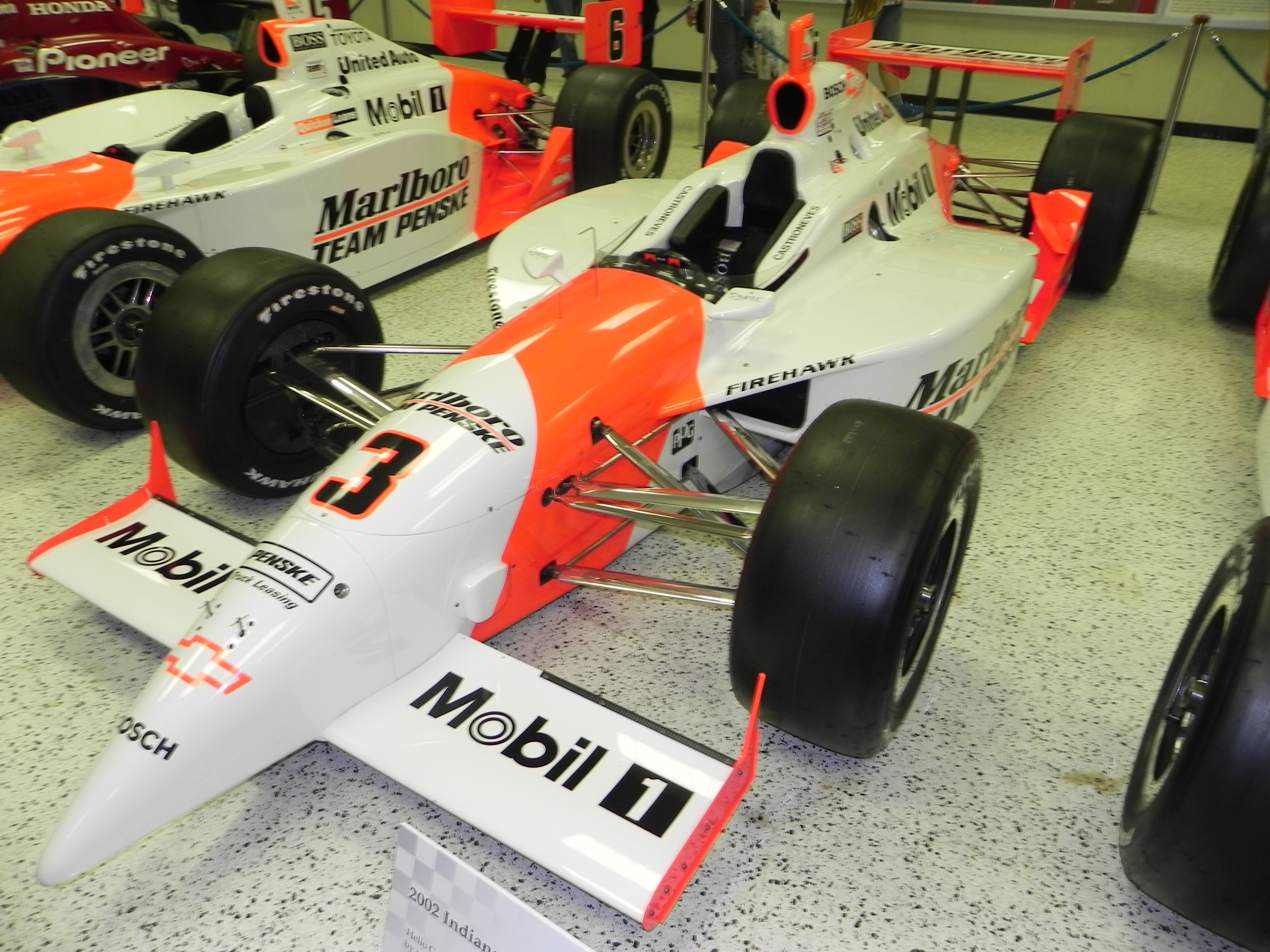
Dallara IR-02

The Dallara IR-00, and its evolutions, the Dallara IR-01 and Dallara IR-02, are open-wheel formula racing cars, designed, developed, and produced by Italian manufacturer Dallara for use in the Indy Racing League, between 2000 and 2002.
