= Team Xtreme Racing (IndyCar) =

Former IndyCar team

- Owner(s): Steve Fisher, Tommy O’Brien, Gary Sharp, Ricky Sharp
- Base: Rockwell, Texas
- Series: Indy Racing League
- Race drivers: Airton Daré, John Hollansworth Jr., Davey Hamilton, Jaques Lazier
- Manufacturer: Dallara; G-Force
- Opened: 1999
- Closed: 2001

Career
- Debut: 1999 TransWorld Diversified Services Indy 200 (Disney World)
- Latest race: 2001 Chevy 500 (Texas)
- Races competed: 33
- Drivers' Championships: 0
- Race victories: 0
- Pole positions: 0

Team Xtreme was an auto racing team that competed in the Indy Racing League from 1999 to 2001. Founded by former F2000 and SCCA racer John Hollansworth Jr., the team ran three full seasons in the series. The team is best known for introducing Brazilian racer Airton Daré to the series, who scored a best result of 2nd for the team in 2000 and took rookie of the year honors the same year. Despite Daré finishing 10th overall in the series in 2001, the team was forced to fold after failing to find a sponsor for 2002.

== Complete IRL IndyCar Series results ==
(key) (Results in bold indicate pole position; results in italics indicate fastest lap)

Year	Chassis	Engine	Drivers	No.	1	2	3	4	5	6	7	8	9	10	11	12	13	Pts Pos	Pos
1999					WDW	PHX	CLT	INDY	TXS	PPIR	ATL	DOV	PPIR	LSV	TXS				
1999	Dallara IR9	Oldsmobile Aurora V8	(United States) John Hollansworth Jr. **(R)**	42	19	15	C^{1}	13	20	16	19	19	16	19	5			17th	**146**
1999	Dallara IR9	Nissan Infiniti VRH35ADE	(United States) Mike Groff	46				DNQ										NC	—
2000					WDW	PHX	LSV	INDY	TXS	PPIR	ATL	KTY	TXS						
2000	G-Force GF01C	Oldsmobile Aurora V8	(United States) Davey Hamilton	16		18	20	20	24	14	15	16						23rd	**98**
2000	G-Force GF01C	Oldsmobile Aurora V8	(United States) Jaques Lazier	16									10					20th	**112**
2000	G-Force GF01C	Oldsmobile Aurora V8	(United States) John Hollansworth Jr.	42	21													40th	**9**
2000	G-Force GF01C	Oldsmobile Aurora V8	(Brazil) Airton Daré **(R)**	88	11	22	14	25	10	2	25	19	12					16th	**142**
2001					PHX	HMS	ATL	INDY	TXS	PPIR	RIR	KAN	NSH	KTY	GAT	CHI	TXS		
2001	G-Force GF01C	Oldsmobile Aurora V8	(United States) Jaques Lazier	77				22	9	17								17th	**195**
2001	G-Force GF01C	Oldsmobile Aurora V8	(Brazil) Airton Daré	88	10	23	9	8	19	5	15	6	17	20	9	19	7	10th	**239**

1. The 1999 VisionAire 500K at Charlotte was cancelled after 79 laps due to spectator fatalities.
