= Billy Roe =

American racing driver

- Roe at the 2015 Indianapolis 500
- Nationality: American
- Born: May 7, 1957 (age 69) Indianapolis, Indiana, U.S.
- Retired: 2004

Indy Racing League IndyCar Series
- Years active: 1997-1998, 2000-2002
- Teams: Roe Racing; Eurointernational; Team Scandia; Blueprint Racing; Logan Racing; Zali Racing
- Starts: 16
- Wins: 0
- Poles: 0
- Best finish: 21st in 2001

Previous series
- 1991-1995 1992 2003-2004: Toyota Atlantic; Indy Lights; Indy Pro Series

Billy Roe (born May 7, 1957, in Indianapolis, Indiana), is a former driver in the Indy Racing League. He raced in the 1997–1998 and 2000–2002 seasons with sixteen career starts, including two at the Indianapolis 500. His best IRL finish was a twelfth place at Nashville Speedway in 2001. In the 1997 Las Vegas Motor Speedway race, he fielded his own car. Prior to racing in the IRL he competed in Toyota Atlantic from 1991 to 1995, however, he never competed in more than three races in a single season. He also competed in two Indy Lights races in 1992. After racing in the IRL he competed in the 2003 and 2004 seasons of the Infiniti Pro Series, finishing sixteenth and tenth in points.

Roe established Indianapolis Motor Speedway's first official electric car lap record of 106.897 mph on May 7, 2011 - first lap, first time around, in the Brawner Hawk EX-11.

== IRL IndyCar Series ==
Year	Team	Chassis	No.	Engine	1	2	3	4	5	6	7	8	9	10	11	12	13	14	15	Rank	Points	Ref
1996	Tempero–Giuffre Racing	Lola T92	25	Buick	WDW	PHX; Wth	INDY													-	0	
1996-97	EuroInternational	Dallara IR7	50	Oldsmobile	NH1	LV1	WDW	PHX; 15	INDY; 22	TEX	PIK	CMS	NH2							34th	55	
1996-97	Roe Racing	Dallara IR7	24	Oldsmobile										LV2; 13						34th	55	
1998	D. B. Mann Motorsports	Dallara IR8	24	Oldsmobile	WDW; DNQ	PHX														37th	11	
1998	Team Scandia	Dallara IR8	33	Oldsmobile			INDY; 30													37th	11	
1998	Blueprint Racing	Dallara IR8	27	Oldsmobile				TEX; 20	NHS	DOV	CLT	PIK	ATL	TEX	LSV					37th	11	
2000	Logan Racing	Dallara	19	Oldsmobile	WDW	PHX	LSV	INDY	TEX; 25	PIK	ATL	KTY	TEX							46th	5	
2001	Zali Racing	G-Force	81	Oldsmobile	PHX	HOM	ATL	INDY	TEX; 13	PIK; 20	RIR; 20	KAN; 22	NSH; 12	KTY; 14	GAT; 23	CHI; 23	TEX; 22			21st	101	
2002	Zali Racing	G-Force	81	Chevrolet	HOM; 21	PHX	CAL	NAZ	INDY; DNQ	TEX	PIK	RIR	KAN	NSH	MIS	KTY	GAT	CHI	TEX	45th	9	

== Indy 500 results ==
Year	Chassis	Engine	Start	Finish
1997	Dallara	Oldsmobile	24th	22nd
1998	Dallara	Oldsmobile	33rd	30th
2002	G-Force	Chevrolet	Failed to Qualify	
