= Pagan Racing =

Pagan Racing was a racing team owned by Texas businessmen Jack and Allan Pagan.

== CART Indy 500 entries ==
The team was founded in 1993 when the team purchased the CART IndyCar equipment of Kenny Bernstein's King Racing. The team fielded a car for Jeff Andretti for the 1993 Indianapolis 500 who finished 29th after a crash. The following year they signed veteran Roberto Guerrero to drive their car. Guerrero started 20th but was knocked out by a crash after only 20 laps. The team upgraded to Ilmor–Mercedes-Benz engines in 1995 and Guerrero brought their car home 12th in the "500".

== Full-time IRL entrant ==
In 1996 the open wheel racing world was rocked by "the split" and Pagan elected to stay with the Indy 500 and race in the Indy Racing League. Jack and his son, Allan, used the family's oil industry connections to obtain Pennzoil sponsorship to race in the 1996 Indianapolis 500 with Guerrero. Guerrero was one of the few veterans in the race and was one of the favorites to win on raceday and while he did not win he registered a respectable 5th-place finish. The team also participated in the other two IRL races of the season and Guerrero finished tied for fourth in the short 1996 championship. The team launched a full-season attack on the championship for the 1996–1997 season and the team selected the Infiniti engine to power their cars when the new cars came at the beginning of 1997. However, the Infiniti motors produced significantly less power than the Oldsmobile engines and the team switched engine manufacturers mid-season after poor results and an Indy 500 where Guerrero was unable to maintain a fast pace. By virtue of being one of only a handful of drivers to compete in all the races, Guerrero and the Pagan team finished 7th in the 1996-1997 championship.

== Decline ==
Guerrero returned in 1998. The team's sponsorship from Pennzoil had left for the new Panther Racing founded by former Pagan crew chief John Barnes. Despite a lack of funding Guerrero ran respectably in the first four races of the season. That lack of funds brought Stevie Reeves on board for the fifth race of the season. Reeves finished 10th, but prize money did not allow for the team to continue and it ceased operations for the rest of the season. The team returned in 1999 with Jeff Ward and minor sponsorship beginning with the Indy 500. Ward finished in Pagan Racing's best finish of second place. However, Ward had few other good finishes that season and finished 11th in points. Funding uncertainties returned at season's end and the team was again without sponsorship. It fielded an entry for Richie Hearn in the 2000 Indianapolis 500 where Hearn was knocked out by an electrical problem. The race was the team's last as rising costs finally put an end to the small team from Texas.

== Drivers ==
- (Colombia) Roberto Guerrero (1994-1998; CART & IRL)
- (United States) Stevie Reeves (1998)
- (United States) Jeff Ward (1999)
- (United States) Richie Hearn (2000)

== Racing results ==
=== Complete CART Indy Car World Series results ===
(key)

Year	Chassis	Engine	Tyres	Drivers	No.	1	2	3	4	5	6	7	8	9	10	11	12	13	14	15	16	17
1993						SFR	PHX	LBH	INDY	MIL	DET	POR	CLE	TOR	MCH	NHA	ROA	VAN	MDO	NAZ	LAG	
1993	Lola T92/00	Buick 3300 V6t	G	(United States) Jeff Andretti	21				29													
1994						SFR	PHX	LBH	INDY	MIL	DET	POR	CLE	TOR	MCH	MDO	NHA	VAN	ROA	NAZ	LAG	
1994	Lola T92/00	Buick 3300 V6t	G	(Colombia) Roberto Guerrero	21				33													
1995						MIA	SFR	PHX	LBH	NAZ	INDY	MIL	DET	POR	ROA	TOR	CLE	MCH	MDO	NHA	VAN	LAG
1995	Reynard 94i	Mercedes-Benz IC108D V8t	G	(United States) Dennis Vitolo	21	18																
1995	Reynard 94i	Mercedes-Benz IC108D V8t	G	(Colombia) Roberto Guerrero	21			16			12											

=== Complete Indy Racing League results ===
(key)

Year	Chassis	Engine	Tyres	Drivers	No.	1	2	3	4	5	6	7	8	9	10	11
1996						WDW	PHX	INDY								
1996	Lola T94/00; Lola T95/00	Ford XB V8t	G	(Colombia) Roberto Guerrero	21	5	16	5*								
1996	Reynard 94i	Ford XB V8t	G	(United States) Billy Boat	99			DNQ								
1996	Lola T92/00	Buick 3300 V6t	G	(United States) Billy Boat	87			DNQ								
1996–1997						NHA	LSV	WDW	PHX	INDY	TXS	PPIR	CLT	NHA	LSV	
1996–1997	Reynard 95i Reynard 94i	Ford XB V8t	G	(Colombia) Roberto Guerrero	21	6	4									
1996–1997	Dallara IR7	Infiniti VRH35ADE V8	G	(Colombia) Roberto Guerrero	21			17	7	27	13					
1996–1997	Dallara IR7	Oldsmobile Aurora V8	G	(Colombia) Roberto Guerrero	21							18	17	6	14	
1998						WDW	PHX	INDY	TXS	NHA	DOV	CLT	PPIR	ATL	TXS	LSV
1998	Dallara IR8	Oldsmobile Aurora V8	G	(Colombia) Roberto Guerrero	21	26	27	22	24							
1998	Dallara IR8	Oldsmobile Aurora V8	G	(United States) Stevie Reeves	21							10				
1999						WDW	PHX	CLT	INDY	TXS	PPIR	ATL	DOV	PPIR	LSV	TXS
1999	Dallara IR9	Oldsmobile Aurora V8	G	(United States) Jeff Ward	21		2	C^{1}	2	18	9	26	13	23	10	21
2000						WDW	PHX	LSV	INDY	TXS	PPIR	ATL	KTY	TXS		
2000	Dallara IR-00	Oldsmobile Aurora V8	F	(United States) Richie Hearn	75				27							

1. The 1999 VisionAire 500K at Charlotte was cancelled after 79 laps due to spectator fatalities.
