= Andy Michner =

American racing driver

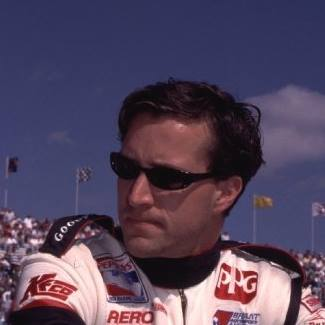
- Nationality: American
- Born: October 27, 1968 (age 58) Ann Arbor, Michigan
- Retired: 2000

Indy Racing League IndyCar Series
- Years active: 1996, 1998-1999
- Teams: Chitwood Motorsports; Riley & Scott; Brant Motorsports; BACE Motorsports NASCAR
- Starts: 7
- Wins: 0
- Poles: 0
- Fastest laps: 0
- Best finish: 24th in 1998

Previous series
- 1996-1998: NASCAR Craftsman Truck Series; BACE Motorsports NASCAR Busch Series

Andy Michner (born October 27, 1968, Ann Arbor, Michigan), is a former driver in the Indy Racing League IndyCar Series, NASCAR Craftsman Truck Series and NASCAR Busch Series. He is the current record holder of the world's fastest Sprint Car race at a United States Auto Club event in Phoenix, Arizona at 136.034 mph 1996. Michner finished twice a runner-up to NASCAR'S Tony Stewart in United States Auto Club competition and has nineteen USAC Wins. He passed his Indy 500 Rookie Orientation Program but elected to not qualify for the race 1996 Indianapolis 500.

In 1996 & 1997, Michner ran a partial season in the NASCAR Craftsman Truck Series as Chevrolet's Development Driver. He then returned to the Indy Car series in 1998 with Konica/Syan Racing and captured his career best finish of eighth place in his first race, the 1998 Indianapolis 500. Michner then signed with Factory Riley&Scott Reebok Indycar Team where Michner led in the closing laps of the 1998 Texas Longhorn 500 but failed to finish due to an engine failure. At Michigan International Speedway in August 1998, it was announced, Michner signed a three-year contract to drive the Bayer Aleve, Coca-Cola Chevrolet in NASCAR's Busch Series for BACE Motorsports. Michner suffered ultimately career ending injuries in October 1998 while testing at Homestead-Miami Speedway in a NASCAR Busch Series test. He attempted to qualify for the 1999 Indianapolis 500 for Byrd Racing but failed to make the field due to rain. He was named to a Logan Racing entry to two races in 2000 but the car did not appear at either race.

== IRL IndyCar Series ==
Year	Team	Chassis	No.	Engine	1	2	3	4	5	6	7	8	9	10	11	Rank	Points	Ref
1998	Chitwood Motorsports	Dallara IR8	17	Oldsmobile	WDW	PHX	INDY; 8	TEX	NHS	DOV						24th	92	
1998	Riley & Scott Cars	Riley & Scott Mk V	15	Oldsmobile							CLT; 12	PIK; 17	ATL; 9	TEX; 15	LSV	24th	92	
1999	Brant Motorsports	Riley & Scott Mark VII	3	Oldsmobile Aurora V8	WDW; 18	PHX; 13	CLT; C^{1}	INDY; DNQ	TEX	PIK	ATL	DOV	PIK	LSV	TEX	32nd	29	
2000	Logan Racing	N/A	19	N/A	WDW	PHX	LSV; Wth	INDY; Wth	TEX	PIK	ATL	KTY	TEX			-	0	

^{1} The 1999 VisionAire 500K at Charlotte was cancelled after 79 laps due to spectator fatalities.
