= Steve Knapp =

American racing driver

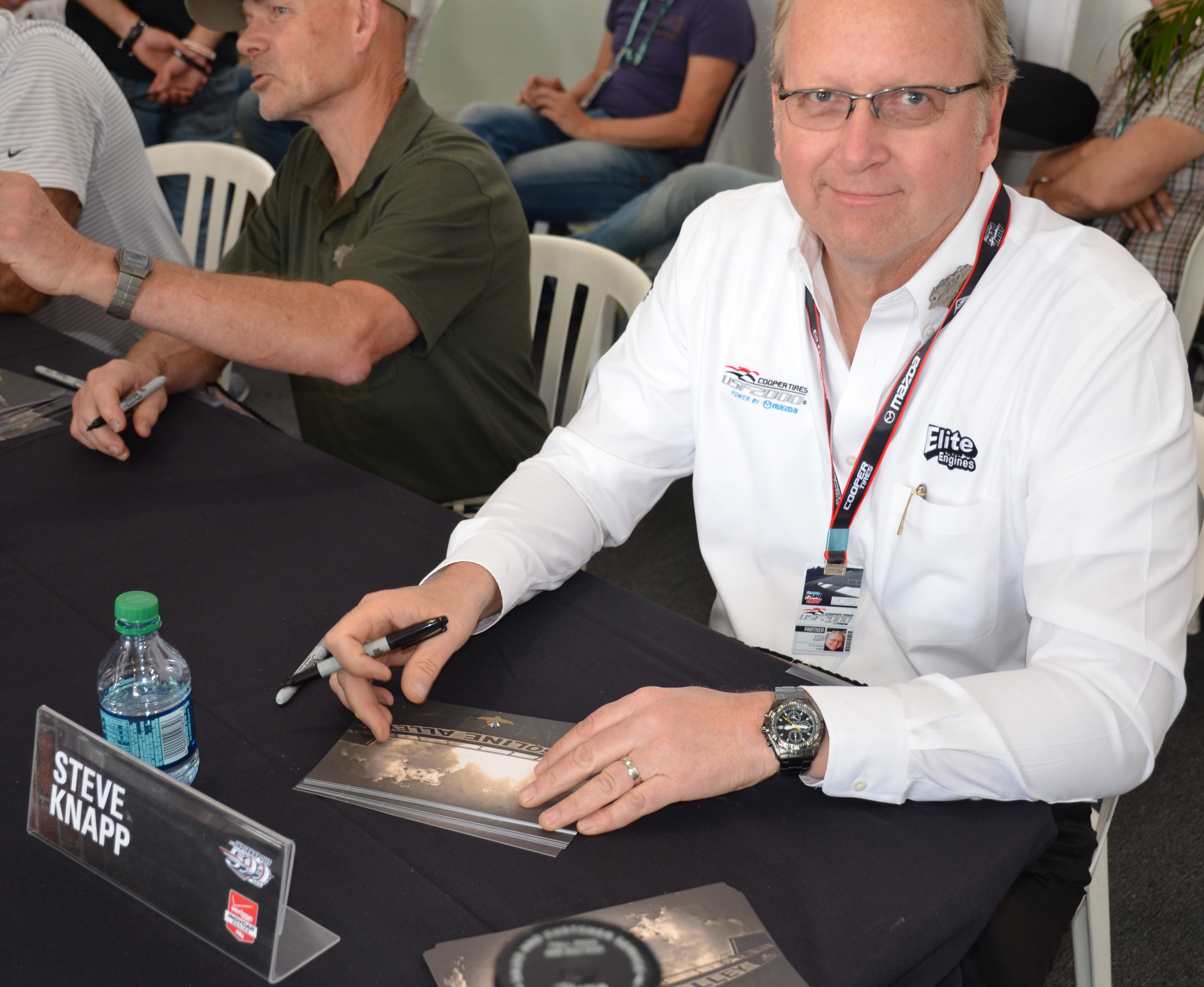
- Knapp in 2015
- Nationality: American
- Born: April 17, 1964 (age 62) Minneapolis, Minnesota, U.S.
- Retired: 2001

Indy Racing League IndyCar Series
- Years active: 1998–2001
- Teams: PDM Racing; ISM Racing; Dreyer & Reinbold Racing
- Starts: 13
- Wins: 0
- Poles: 0
- Best finish: 22nd in 1998

Previous series
- 1997: Toyota Atlantic

Awards
- 1998: Indianapolis 500 Rookie of the Year

Steve Knapp (born April 17, 1964, Minneapolis, Minnesota) is a former driver in IndyCar. He raced in the 1998–2000 seasons with thirteen career starts, including three at the Indianapolis 500. His best career finish was in his first race, a third place at the 1998 Indianapolis 500, where he was named Rookie of the Year. He never led a lap in any of his IRL races. Knapp now owns and operates Elite Engines out of West Bend specializing in FA, FC, S2, HART F2 and Mazda engines for the U.S. F2000 National Championship.

== Racing record ==
=== SCCA National Championship Runoffs ===
Year	Track	Car	Engine	Class	Finish	Start	Status
1983	Road Atlanta	Lynx	Volkswagen	Formula Vee	13	26	Running
1984	Road Atlanta	Lazer	Volkswagen	Formula Vee	4	16	Running
1985	Road Atlanta	Lazer L85	Volkswagen	Formula Vee	12	1	Running
1986	Road Atlanta	Lola T86/90	Ford	Sports 2000	1	6	Running
1987	Road Atlanta	Lola T87/90	Ford	Sports 2000	2	2	Running
1988	Road Atlanta	Reynard 88SF	Ford	Formula Continental	3	3	Running
1995	Mid-Ohio	Van Diemen	Ford	Formula Continental	2	3	Running

=== IRL IndyCar Series ===
Year	Team	Chassis	No.	Engine	1	2	3	4	5	6	7	8	9	10	11	12	13	Rank	Points	Ref
1998	ISM Racing	G-Force GF01B	55	Oldsmobile	WDW	PHX	INDY; 3	TEX	NHS									22nd	118	
1998	PDM Racing	G-Force GF01B	18	Oldsmobile						DOV; 13	CLT	PIK; 14	ATL; 14	TEX; 18	LSV; 9			22nd	118	
1999	PDM Racing	G-Force GF01C	18	Oldsmobile Aurora V8	WDW; 7													25th	69	
1999	ISM Racing	G-Force GF01C	35	Oldsmobile Aurora V8		PHX; 25	CLT; DNQ^{1}	INDY; 26	TEX; 12	PIK; 17	ATL; 27	DOV	PIK	LSV	TEX			25th	69	
2000	Dreyer & Reinbold Racing	G-Force	23	Oldsmobile	WDW	PHX	LSV	INDY; 19	TEX	PIK	ATL	KTY	TEX					38th	11	
2001	Brayton Racing	Dallara	37	Oldsmobile	PHX	HOM	ATL	INDY; DNQ										-	0	
2001	Hemelgarn Racing	Dallara	93	Oldsmobile				INDY; DNQ	TEX	PIK	RIR	KAN	NSH	KTY	GAT	CHI	TEX	-	0	

^{1} The 1999 VisionAire 500K at Charlotte was cancelled after 79 laps due to spectator fatalities.

=== Indianapolis 500 ===
Year	Chassis	Engine	Start	Finish	Team
1998	G-Force	Oldsmobile	23	3	ISM Racing
1999	G-Force	Oldsmobile	13	26	ISM Racing
2000	G-Force	Infiniti	27	19	Dreyer & Reinbold
2001	Dallara	Oldsmobile	DNQ		Brayton

Sporting positions
Preceded by Jeff Ward	Indianapolis 500; Rookie of the Year; 1998	Succeeded by Robby McGehee
