= Bradley Motorsports =

Indy racing team

Bradley Motorsports was a racing team in the Indy Racing League owned by Colorado convenience store owner Brad Calkins. His son, Buzz Calkins, drove the bright red cars shod in the livery of Bradley Food Marts, Brad Calkins' company. Bradley won the first IRL race in 1996 at Walt Disney World Speedway and were the co-champions of the inaugural IRL season. The team began in 1990, supporting Calkins' rise through the Indy Lights development series. After Calkins' retirement from the cockpit at the end of the 2001 season, the team ran a program in the first half of the 2002 season for Japanese pay driver Shigeaki Hattori, but following poor finishes, Hattori left after the Pikes Peak International Raceway race. The team finished out the season unsponsored with Brazilian Raul Boesel driving in his final season of open wheel racing. Bradley Motorsports earlier had a pro super vee team in the mid and late 1980s that ran the Bradley Food Marts car driven by future RuSPORT co-owner Steve Wulff.

== Complete IRL/IndyCar Series results ==
(key) (Results in bold indicate pole position; results in italics indicate fastest lap)

Year	Chassis	Engine	Drivers	No.	1	2	3	4	5	6	7	8	9	10	11	12	13	14	15	Pts Pos	Pos
1996					WDW	PHX	INDY														
1996	Reynard 95i	Ford-Cosworth	(United States) Buzz Calkins	12	1*	6	17													1st	246
1996–97					NHA	LSV	WDW	PHX	INDY	TXS	PPIR	CLT	NHA	LSV							
1996–97	Reynard 95i	Ford-Cosworth	(United States) Buzz Calkins	12	2	6														10th	204
1996–97	G-Force GF01	Infiniti	(United States) Buzz Calkins	12			11	8	11	19	5		21	28						10th	204
1998					WDW	PHX	INDY	TXS	NHA	DOV	CLT	PPIR	ATL	TXS	LSV						
1998	G-Force GF01B	Oldsmobile Aurora V8	(United States) Buzz Calkins	12	14	9	10	15	15			24	28	11	11					19th	134
1999					WDW	PHX	CLT	INDY	TXS	PPIR	ATL	DOV	PPIR	LSV	TXS						
1999	Dallara IR9	Oldsmobile Aurora V8	(United States) Buzz Calkins	12	17	14														13th	201
1999	G-Force GF01C	Oldsmobile Aurora V8	(United States) Buzz Calkins	12			C^{1}	19	9	14	5	8	15	5	8					13th	201
2000					WDW	PHX	LSV	INDY	TXS	PPIR	ATL	KTY	TXS								
2000	Dallara IR-00	Oldsmobile Aurora V8	(United States) Buzz Calkins	12	8	23	25	18	4	12	23	12	9							15th	145
2001					PHX	HMS	ATL	INDY	TXS	PPIR	RIR	KAN	NSH	KTY	GAT	CHI	TXS				
2001	Dallara IR-01	Oldsmobile Aurora V8	(United States) Buzz Calkins	12	9	16	3	12	15	15	10	13	9	16	22	9	10			9th	242
2002					HMS	PHX	FON	NAZ	INDY	TXS	PPIR	RIR	KAN	NSH	MCH	KTY	GAT	CHI	TXS		
2002	Dallara IR-02	Infiniti	(Japan) Shigeaki Hattori	12		25	26	10	20	6	19									27th	78
2002	Dallara IR-02	Infiniti	(Brazil) Raul Boesel	12									11	5	15	13	8	11	22	19th	158

1. The 1999 VisionAire 500K was cancelled after 79 laps due to spectator fatalities.
