= Kelley Racing =

American auto racing team

Kelley Racing is a former Indy Racing League team founded by Fort Wayne, Indiana-based car dealer Tom Kelley that fielded a Delphi sponsored car for Scott Sharp during its entire existence from 1998 to 2004. The team was based in Indianapolis and captured 9 wins (7 with Sharp, 1 with Mark Dismore, and 1 with Al Unser Jr.) before shutting down when Sharp decided to leave the team with his sponsorship after a poor 2004 season. The assets of the team were bought by Tony George, who transformed it into Vision Racing.

== Former drivers ==
All drivers were (United States) American.

- Mark Dismore (1997–2001)
- Sarah Fisher (2004)
- Tony Renna (2002–2003)
- Scott Sharp (1998–2004)
- Al Unser Jr. (2002–2003)

== Complete IRL IndyCar Series results ==
(key) (Results in bold indicate pole position; results in italics indicate fastest lap)

Year	Chassis	Engine	Tyres	Drivers	No.	1	2	3	4	5	6	7	8	9	10	11	12	13	14	15	16	Pos	Pts Pos
1996–97						NHA	LSV	WDW	PHX	INDY	TXS	PPIR	CLT	NHA	LSV								
1996–97	Dallara IR7	Oldsmobile Aurora V8	G	(United States) Mark Dismore	28					28	11	11	19	11	5							17th	158
1998						WDW	PHX	INDY	TXS	NHA	DOV	CLT	PPIR	ATL	TXS	LSV							
1998	Dallara IR8	Oldsmobile Aurora V8	G	(United States) Scott Sharp	8	6	1	16	5	3	1*	18	11	18	23	12						4th	272
1998	Dallara IR8	Oldsmobile Aurora V8	G	(United States) Mark Dismore	28	5	16	27	21	8	18	15	19	7	10	15						15th	180
1999						WDW	PHX	CLT	INDY	TXS	PPIR	ATL	DOV	PPIR	LSV	TXS							
1999	Dallara IR9	Oldsmobile Aurora V8	G	(United States) Scott Sharp	8	**4***	8	C^{1}	28	10	8	1	22	22	4	19						8th	220
1999	Dallara IR9	Oldsmobile Aurora V8	G	(United States) Mark Dismore	28	6	7	C^{1}	16	**8**	21	17	**15***	3	20	1						**3rd**	240
2000						WDW	PHX	LSV	INDY	TXS	PPIR	ATL	KTY	TXS									
2000	Dallara IR-00	Oldsmobile Aurora V8	F	(United States) Scott Sharp	8	15	5*	27	10	1	3*	16	24	24								7th	196
2000	Dallara IR-00	Oldsmobile Aurora V8	F	(United States) Mark Dismore	28	16	16	**2***	11	6	4	18	11	14								5th	202
2001						PHX	HMS	ATL	INDY	TXS	PPIR	RIR	KAN	NSH	KTY	GAT	CHI	TXS					
2001	Dallara IR-01	Oldsmobile Aurora V8	F	(United States) Scott Sharp	8	4	8	2	**33**	1	8	5	**17**	5	**2***	8	25	2				**3rd**	355
2001	Dallara IR-01	Oldsmobile Aurora V8	F	(United States) Mark Dismore	28	25	7	26	16	**20**	13	6	11	16	22	2	17	23				14th	205
2002						HMS	PHX	FON	NAZ	INDY	TXS	PPIR	RIR	KAN	NSH	MCH	KTY	GAT	CHI	TXS			
2002	Dallara IR-02	Chevrolet Indy V8	F	(United States) Scott Sharp	8	20	16	8	1	27	14	5	21	6	8	9	4	18	7	4		6th	332
2002	Dallara IR-02	Chevrolet Indy V8	F	(United States) Al Unser Jr.	7	19	5	11	12	12	2	6	5	17			6	7	2	20		7th	311
2002	Dallara IR-02	Chevrolet Indy V8	F	(United States) Tony Renna	7										10	4						24th	121
2002	Dallara IR-02	Chevrolet Indy V8	F	(United States) Tony Renna	78												7	24	15	9		24th	121
2003						HMS	PHX	MOT	INDY	TXS	PPIR	RIR	KAN	NSH	MCH	GAT	KTY	NAZ	CHI	FON	TXS		
2003	Dallara IR-03	Toyota Indy V8	F	(United States) Scott Sharp	8	5	7	1	20	16	11	17	16	13	4	10	13	12	11	8	6	8th	351
2003	Dallara IR-03	Toyota Indy V8	F	(United States) Al Unser Jr.	31	13	4	5	9	1	14	10	14	8	9	20	4	6	19	9	9	6th	374
2003	Dallara IR-03	Toyota Indy V8	F	(United States) Tony Renna	32				7													30th	26
2004						HMS	PHX	MOT	INDY	TXS	RIR	KAN	NSH	MIL	MCH	KTY	PPIR	NAZ	CHI	FON	TXS		
2004	Dallara IR-04	Toyota Indy V8	F	(United States) Scott Sharp	8	9	13	9	13	18	9	20	14	15	9	17	15	19	9	11	8	13th	282
2004	Dallara IR-04	Toyota Indy V8	F	(United States) Sarah Fisher	39				21													31st	12

1. The 1999 VisionAire 500K at Charlotte was cancelled after 79 laps due to spectator fatalities.

== IndyCar wins ==
#	Season	Date	Sanction	Track / Race	No.	Winning driver	Chassis	Engine	Tire	Grid	Laps Led
1	1998	March 22	IRL	Phoenix International Raceway (O)	8	(United States) Scott Sharp	Dallara IR8	Oldsmobile Aurora V8	Goodyear	8	30
2	1998	July 19	IRL	Dover Downs International Speedway (O)	8	(United States) Scott Sharp (2)	Dallara IR8	Oldsmobile Aurora V8	Goodyear	4	145
3	1999	July 17	IRL	Atlanta Motor Speedway (O)	8	(United States) Scott Sharp (3)	Dallara IR9	Oldsmobile Aurora V8	Goodyear	6	42
4	1999	October 17	IRL	Texas Motor Speedway (O)	28	(United States) Mark Dismore	Dallara IR9	Oldsmobile Aurora V8	Goodyear	2	31
5	2000	June 11	IRL	Texas Motor Speedway (O)	8	(United States) Scott Sharp (4)	Dallara IR-00	Oldsmobile Aurora V8	Firestone	12	38
6	2001	June 9	IRL	Texas Motor Speedway (O)	8	(United States) Scott Sharp (5)	Dallara IR-01	Oldsmobile Aurora V8	Firestone	2	33
7	2002	April 21	IRL	Nazareth Speedway (O)	8	(United States) Scott Sharp (6)	Dallara IR-02	Chevrolet Indy V8	Firestone	11	33
8	2003	April 13	IRL	Twin Ring Motegi (O)	8	(United States) Scott Sharp (7)	Dallara IR-03	Toyota Indy V8	Firestone	7	26
9	2003	June 7	IRL	Texas Motor Speedway (O)	31	(United States) Al Unser Jr.	Dallara IR-03	Toyota Indy V8	Firestone	7	54
