= Jim Guthrie (racing driver) =

American racing driver (born 1961)

- Nationality: American
- Born: September 13, 1961 (age 65) Gadsden, Alabama, U.S.
- Retired: 2001

Indy Racing League IndyCar Series
- Years active: 1996-2001
- Teams: Blueprint Racing; ISM Racing; Cobb Racing; Riley & Scott; Coulson Racing
- Starts: 15
- Wins: 1
- Poles: 0
- Fastest laps: 0
- Best finish: 12th in 1996-1997

Previous series
- 1995: Toyota Atlantic

Awards
- 1997: Indy Racing League Rookie of the Year

Jim Guthrie (born September 13, 1961 in Gadsden, Alabama) is a former driver in the Indy Racing League. He debuted in the Indy Racing League in 1996 with moderately successful results. When the IRL moved to purpose-built chassis in 1997, Guthrie was forced to take out a second mortgage to purchase a new chassis. With no sponsorship and the prospects of losing his house if his venture was unsuccessful, he won the second race in the new chassis at Phoenix International Raceway. He got sponsorship from Jacuzzi for the Indianapolis 500 and was able to finish the season (placing twelfth in season points) winning Rookie of the Year honors and kept his house. Guthrie contested four races in 1998, but then during the Indianapolis 500, he was seriously injured in a multi-car crash, but he returned later in the season for two different teams. He attempted the 1999 Indianapolis 500 but failed to qualify his Coulson Racing entry.

Guthrie was later an owner of Guthrie Meyer Racing in the Firestone Indy Lights Series that fielded a car for his son Sean, who raced in the Star Mazda Series in 2005. The team began with 2005 IPS driver Travis Gregg at Homestead, and 2005 Star Mazda champion Raphael Matos scoring the team's first two wins at St. Petersburg (there were two races on that weekend). For the 2008 season, the team had three cars with Logan Gomez filling the second seat and the third was run by Tom Wieringa and Robbie Pecorari. Franck Perera joined the team for the second half of the season and captured a win at Infineon Raceway.

Guthrie later started competing in Formula Drift with a Chevrolet powered Mazda RX-7 sponsored by Car Crafters of Albuquerque.

On September 25, 2012, Guthrie under-steered, crashed and flipped his 2011 Ford Mustang into a tire wall at Formula Drift/Pro Am Round 4 (After Dark); the result of a driver error.

Today, Guthrie is actively involved in the local community in Albuquerque. His business, Car Crafters, has recently expanded to five locations around the Albuquerque area. One of his latest interests is triathlons, as he completed his first Half-Ironman in April 2016 in Monterrey, Mexico.

== Racing record ==
=== American Open Wheel Racing results ===
(key)

==== Indy Racing League ====
| Year | Team | Chassis | No. | Engine | 1 | 2 | 3 | 4 | 5 | 6 | 7 | 8 | 9 | 10 | 11 | 12 | 13 | Rank | Points | Ref |
|---|---|---|---|---|---|---|---|---|---|---|---|---|---|---|---|---|---|---|---|---|
| 1996 | Blueprint Racing | Lola T93/00 | 27 | Menard Indy V6t | WDW | PHX; 15 | INDY; 18 | | | | | | | | | | | 20th | 74 | |
| 1996-97 | Blueprint Racing | Lola T93/00 | 27 | Menard Indy V6t | NHM; 23 | | | | | | | | | | | | | 12th | 186 | |
| 1996-97 | Blueprint Racing | Lola T93/00 | 27 | Buick 3300 V6t | | LVS; 13 | | | | | | | | | | | | 12th | 186 | |
| 1996-97 | Blueprint Racing | Dallara IR7 | 27 | Oldsmobile Aurora V8 | | | WDW; 6 | PHX; 1 | INDY; 26 | TXS; 21 | PPIR; Wth | CLT; 12 | NH2; 24 | LV2; 4 | | | | 12th | 186 | |
| 1998 | ISM Racing | G-Force GF01B | 53 | Oldsmobile Aurora V8 | WDW; DNQ | PHX; DNQ | INDY; 29 | TXS | NHM | | | | | | | | | 33rd | 41 | |
| 1998 | CBR Cobb Racing | G-Force GF01B | 23 | Infiniti VRH35ADE V8 | | | | | | DOV; 7 | | | | | | | | 33rd | 41 | |
| 1998 | CBR Cobb Racing | G-Force GF01B | 23 | Oldsmobile Aurora V8 | | | | | | | CLT; 22 | PPIR | ATL | TX2 | | | | 33rd | 41 | |
| 1998 | Riley & Scott Cars | Riley & Scott Mk V | 15 | Oldsmobile Aurora V8 | | | | | | | | | | | LVS; 24 | | | 33rd | 41 | |
| 1999 | Coulson Racing | Dallara IR9 | 34 | Oldsmobile Aurora V8 | WDW | PHX | CLT | INDY; DNQ | TXS | PPIR | ATL | DOV | PPI2 | LVS | TX2 | | | NC | - | |
| 2001 | Blueprint Racing | G-Force GF05B | 27 | Oldsmobile Aurora V8 | PHX | HMS | ATL | INDY; DNQ | TXS | PPIR | RIR | KAN | NSH | KTY | STL | CHI | TX2 | NC | - | |

==== Indianapolis 500 ====
| Year | Chassis | Engine | Start | Finish |
|---|---|---|---|---|
| 1996 | Lola | Menard-Buick | 19th | 18th |
| 1997 | Dallara | Oldsmobile | 6th | 26th |
| 1998 | G-Force | Oldsmobile | 20th | 29th |
| 1999 | Dallara | Oldsmobile | Failed to Qualify | |
| 2001 | G-Force | Oldsmobile | Practice Crash | |

Sporting positions
| Preceded by Gil de Ferran (CART Rookie of the Year) | IndyCar Series; Rookie of the Year; 1996–97 | Succeeded by Robby Unser |
