= 1998 Indy Racing League =

American auto racing season

1998 Indy Racing League season
- Pep Boys Indy Racing League
- 1998 Indy Racing League

Season
- Races: 11
- Start date: January 24
- End date: October 11

Awards
- Drivers' champion: (Sweden) Kenny Bräck
- Manufacturers' Cup: (United States) Oldsmobile
- Rookie of the Year: (United States) Robby Unser
- Indianapolis 500 winner: (United States) Eddie Cheever

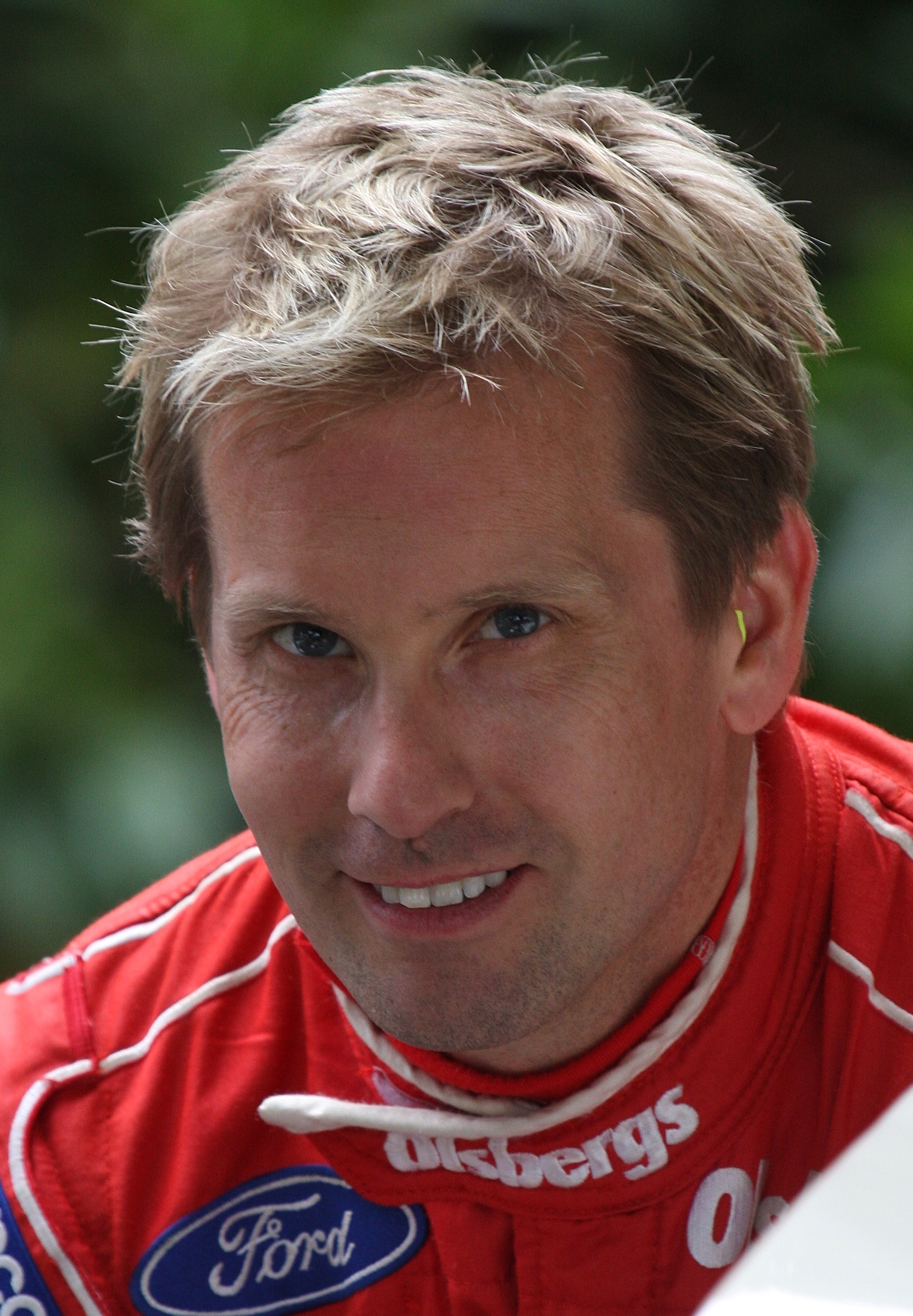
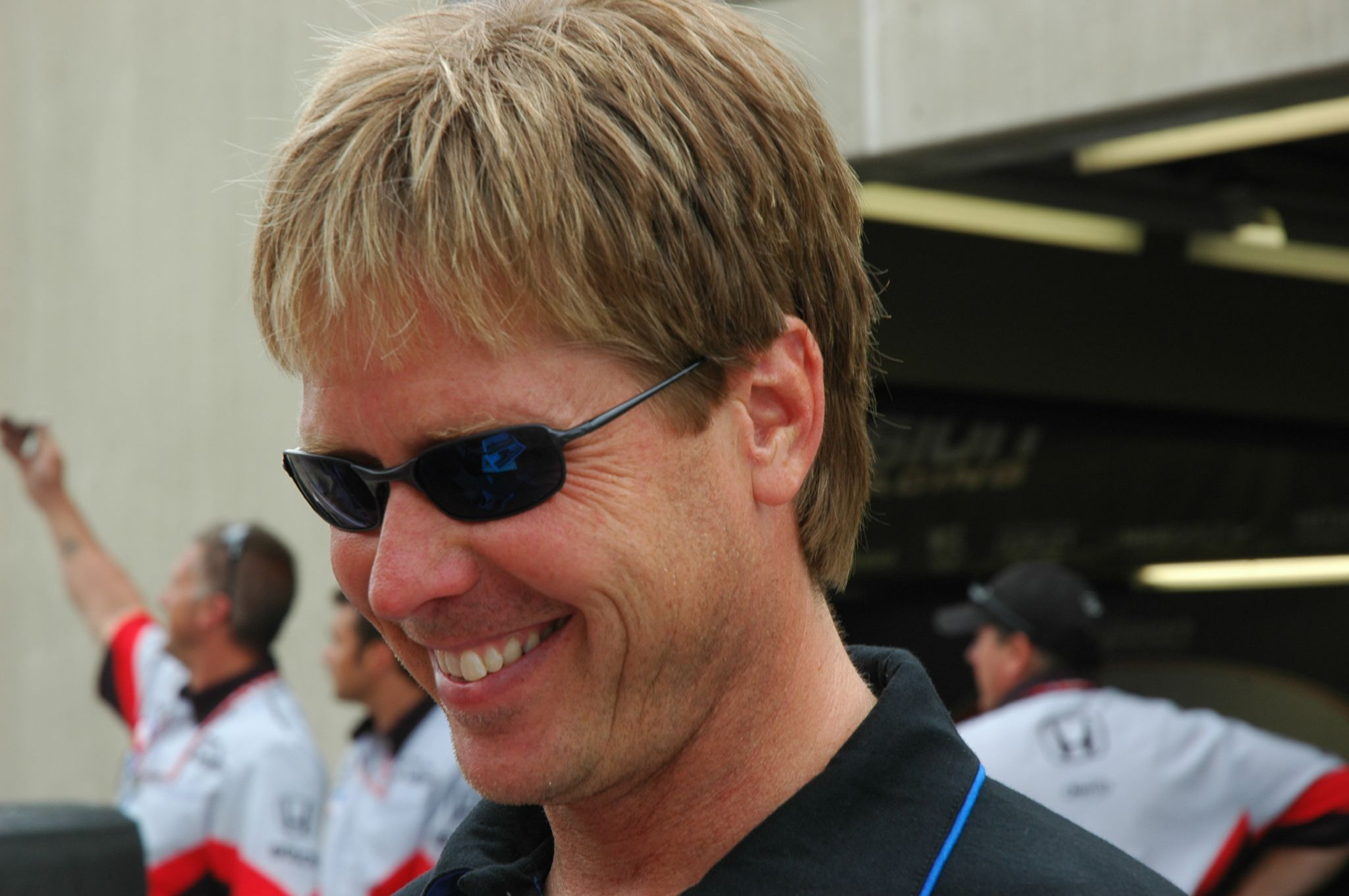
Kenny Bräck (left) won his first and only Drivers' Championship while Davey Hamilton (right) finished second in the championship again.

The 1998 Pep Boys Indy Racing League was one of relative stability compared to the previous two seasons. For the first time the season consisted of a single and complete spring, summer, and fall like all other motorsports. 15 drivers completed the entire 11 race schedule, twice as many as the previous season. It was also the first complete season for the new Riley & Scott chassis, though it proved unpopular due to its late introduction. A. J. Foyt Enterprises drivers captured 4 wins, the Indy 500 pole, and the championship, arguably the most successful year in the team's history.

== Confirmed entries ==
Team	Chassis	Engine	Tires	No.	Driver(s)	Round(s)
(United States) A. J. Foyt Enterprises	Dallara	Oldsmobile	G	11	(United States) Billy Boat (Note: Injured at New Hampshire.)	1–5, 8–11
(United States) A. J. Foyt Enterprises	Dallara	Oldsmobile	G	11	(United States) Greg Ray	6–7
(United States) A. J. Foyt Enterprises	Dallara	Oldsmobile	G	14	(Sweden) Kenny Bräck	All
(United States) Beck Motorsports	Dallara	Infiniti	F	54	(Japan) Hideshi Matsuda	3
(United States) Blueprint Racing	Dallara	Oldsmobile	F	27	(United States) Robbie Groff	1–2
(United States) Blueprint Racing	Dallara	Oldsmobile	F	27	(Canada) Claude Bourbonnais	3
(United States) Blueprint Racing	Dallara	Oldsmobile	F	27	(United States) Billy Roe	4
(United States) Bradley Motorsports	G-Force; Dallara (Note: Used from Atlanta onwards.)	Oldsmobile	G	12	(United States) Buzz Calkins	1–6, 8–11
(United States) Byrd-Cunningham Racing	G-Force	Oldsmobile	F	10	(United States) Mike Groff (Note: Initially replaced by Brian Tyler on Bump Day for the Indy 500, before Tyler relinquished the seat after practising.) (Note: Joe Gosek passed his Indianapolis rookie test in the car.)	1–3
(United States) Byrd-Cunningham Racing	G-Force	Oldsmobile	F	10	(United States) John Paul Jr.	4–11
(United States) Cahill Auto Racing	G-Force; Dallara (Note: Used from Charlotte onwards.)	Oldsmobile	F	98	(United States) Donnie Beechler R	3–5, 7–11
(United States) CBR Cobb Racing	G-Force	Oldsmobile	G (Note: Used at Phoenix, Indianapolis and Pikes Peak.); F	23	(United States) Paul Durant	2–4
(United States) CBR Cobb Racing	G-Force	Oldsmobile	G F	23	(United States) Jim Guthrie (Note: Signed after being injured at the Indy 500 while driving for ISM Racing.)	6–7
(United States) CBR Cobb Racing	G-Force	Infiniti	G F	23	(Colombia) Roberto Guerrero	8–11
(United States) Chastain Motorsports	G-Force; Dallara (Note: Used at New Hampshire, Charlotte, Atlanta and Texas 2.)	Oldsmobile	G	77	(France) Stéphan Grégoire	All
(United States) Chitwood Motorsports	Dallara	Oldsmobile	G	17	(United States) Brian Tyler R	1–2
(United States) Chitwood Motorsports	Dallara	Oldsmobile	G	17	(United States) Andy Michner R	3
(United States) D. B. Mann Motorsports	Dallara	Oldsmobile	G	24	(United States) Billy Roe	1
(United States) D. B. Mann Motorsports	Dallara	Oldsmobile	G	24	(United States) Dan Drinan R	3
(United States) Hemelgarn Racing	Dallara	Oldsmobile	G	9	(United States) Johnny Unser	3
(United States) Hemelgarn Racing	Dallara	Oldsmobile	G	91	(United States) Buddy Lazier	All
(United States) Immke Racing	Dallara	Oldsmobile	G	20	(United States) Tyce Carlson	1–3
(United States) ISM Racing	G-Force	Oldsmobile	G	35	(United States) Jeff Ward	All
(United States) ISM Racing	G-Force	Oldsmobile	G	53	(United States) Jim Guthrie	1–3
(United States) ISM Racing	G-Force	Oldsmobile	G	55	(United States) Steve Knapp R	3
(United States) Kelley Racing	Dallara	Oldsmobile	G	8	(United States) Scott Sharp	All
(United States) Kelley Racing	Dallara	Oldsmobile	G	28	(United States) Mark Dismore	All
(United States) Knapp Motorsports	Dallara	Oldsmobile	F	97	(United States) Greg Ray	1–4, 9–11
(United States) Liberty Racing	G-Force	Oldsmobile	F	29	(United States) Joe Gosek R (Note: Not considered rookie for the Indy 500.)	3–4
(United States) LP Racing	Dallara	Oldsmobile	F	66	(United States) Scott Harrington R	3
(United States) LP Racing	Dallara	Oldsmobile	F	99	(United States) Sam Schmidt	All
(United States) Lyn St. James Racing	G-Force	Infiniti	G	90	(United States) Lyn St. James	3
(United States) McCormack Motorsports	G-Force	Oldsmobile	G	30	(Brazil) Raul Boesel	All
(United States) Metro Racing Systems	Riley & Scott	Oldsmobile	G	19	(United States) Stan Wattles (Note: Considered rookie only for the Indy 500.)	1–5, 7–11
(United States) Nienhouse Motorsports	G-Force; Dallara (Note: Used at Charlotte, and from Atlanta onwards.)	Oldsmobile	G	6	(United States) Davey Hamilton	All
(United States) Pagan Racing	Dallara	Oldsmobile	G	21	(Colombia) Roberto Guerrero	1–4
(United States) Pagan Racing	Dallara	Oldsmobile	G	21	(United States) Stevie Reeves R	7
(United States) Panther Racing	G-Force	Oldsmobile	G	4	(Canada) Scott Goodyear	All
(United States) Panther Racing	G-Force	Oldsmobile	G	43	(United States) Dave Steele R	10–11
(United States) PDM Racing	G-Force	Oldsmobile	G	18	(United States) John Paul Jr.	1–2
(United States) PDM Racing	G-Force	Oldsmobile	G	18	(United States) Jack Hewitt R	3–5
(United States) PDM Racing	G-Force	Oldsmobile	G	18	(United States) Steve Knapp R (Note: Injured at Dover.)	6, 8–11
(United States) PDM Racing	G-Force	Oldsmobile	G	18	(United States) Tyce Carlson	7
(United States) Phoenix Racing	G-Force	Oldsmobile	F	16	(Brazil) Marco Greco	All
(United States) Riley & Scott Cars	Riley & Scott	Oldsmobile	G	15	(Chile) Eliseo Salazar (Note: Injured in a practice crash at Dover.)	1–5
(United States) Riley & Scott Cars	Riley & Scott	Oldsmobile	G	15	(United States) Scott Harrington R	6
(United States) Riley & Scott Cars	Riley & Scott	Oldsmobile	G	15	(United States) Andy Michner R (Note: Injured in a NASCAR Busch Series test at Homestead-Miami Speedway.)	7–10
(United States) Riley & Scott Cars	Riley & Scott	Oldsmobile	G	15	(United States) Jim Guthrie	11
(Austria) RSM Marko	Dallara	Oldsmobile	F	22	(United States) Dave Steele R	2
(United States) Sinden Racing Services	Dallara	Infiniti; Oldsmobile (Note: Used by J. J. Yeley at Phoenix and Indianapolis.)	F	40	(United States) Dr. Jack Miller	All
(United States) Sinden Racing Services	Dallara	Infiniti; Oldsmobile	F	44	(United States) J. J. Yeley R	2–5, 9
(United States) Sinden Racing Services	Dallara	Infiniti; Oldsmobile	F	44	(United States) Jimmy Kite	7
(United States) Team Cheever	Dallara (Note: Used by Eddie Cheever. Robby Unser used it at Indianapolis and New Hampshire.); G-Force	Oldsmobile	G	51	(United States) Eddie Cheever	All
(United States) Team Cheever	Dallara; G-Force	Oldsmobile	G	52	(United States) Robby Unser R	3–6, 8–11
(United States) Team Coulson Racing	G-Force	Oldsmobile	F	41	(Brazil) Affonso Giaffone	1
(United States) Team Menard	Dallara; G-Force (Note: Used at Walt Disney World. Tony Stewart used it at Phoenix and Dover.)	Oldsmobile	F	1	(United States) Tony Stewart	All
(United States) Team Menard	Dallara; G-Force	Oldsmobile	F	3	(United States) Robbie Buhl	1–5, 8–11
(United States) Team Pelfrey	Dallara	Oldsmobile	G	81	(United States) John Paul Jr. (Note: He replaced Danny Ongais, who got injured in a practice crash.)	3
(United States) Team Pelfrey	Dallara	Oldsmobile	G	81	(United States) Tyce Carlson	4
(United States) Team Pelfrey	Dallara	Oldsmobile	G	81	(United States) Brian Tyler R	5–11
(United States) Team Scandia	Dallara	Oldsmobile	G	7	(United States) Jimmy Kite	1–4
(United States) Team Scandia	Dallara	Oldsmobile	G	33	(United States) Billy Roe	3
(United States) Treadway Racing	G-Force	Oldsmobile	F (Note: Used at Las Vegas.)G	5	(Netherlands) Arie Luyendyk	All

== Schedule ==
Rnd	Date	Race Name	Track	Location
1	January 24	Indy 200 at Walt Disney World	Walt Disney World Speedway	Bay Lake, Florida
2	March 22	Dura Lube 200	Phoenix International Raceway	Avondale, Arizona
3	May 24	82nd Indianapolis 500	Indianapolis Motor Speedway	Speedway, Indiana
4	June 6	True Value 500	Texas Motor Speedway	Fort Worth, Texas
5	June 28	New England 200	New Hampshire International Speedway	Loudon, New Hampshire
6	July 19	Pep Boys 400K	Dover International Speedway	Dover, Delaware
7	July 25	VisionAire 500K	Charlotte Motor Speedway	Concord, North Carolina
8	August 16	Radisson 200	Pikes Peak International Raceway	Fountain, Colorado
9	August 29	Atlanta 500 Classic	Atlanta Motor Speedway	Hampton, Georgia
10	September 20	Lone Star 500	Texas Motor Speedway	Fort Worth, Texas
11	October 11	Las Vegas 500K	Las Vegas Motor Speedway	Las Vegas, Nevada

All races were run on oval speedways.

The eight races that were held in calendar year 1997 returned in 1998, with the addition of three new races. As part of their effort to venture in traditional stock-car markets, the IRL held the second Indy-car race ever, the first since 1969, at Dover International Speedway, and also competed at the reconfigured Atlanta Motor Speedway, which had been raced eight times by Indy-cars in its former shape between 1965 and 1983. A second race at Texas Motor Speedway in the fall completed the calendar.

== Results ==
Rd.	Race	Pole position	Fastest lap	Most laps led	Race Winner				Report
Rd.	Race	Pole position	Fastest lap	Most laps led	Driver	Team	Chassis	Engine	Report
1	Walt Disney World	(United States) Tony Stewart	(Sweden) Kenny Bräck	(United States) Tony Stewart	(United States) Tony Stewart	Team Menard	G-Force	Oldsmobile	Report
2	Phoenix	(United States) Jeff Ward	(United States) Tony Stewart	(United States) Tony Stewart	(United States) Scott Sharp	Kelley Racing	Dallara	Oldsmobile	Report
3	Indianapolis	(United States) Billy Boat	(United States) Tony Stewart	(United States) Eddie Cheever	(United States) Eddie Cheever	Team Cheever	Dallara	Oldsmobile	Report
4	Texas 1	(United States) Tony Stewart	(United States) Tony Stewart	(United States) Billy Boat	(United States) Billy Boat	A. J. Foyt Enterprises	Dallara	Oldsmobile	Report
5	New Hampshire	(United States) Billy Boat	(United States) Davey Hamilton	(United States) Tony Stewart	(United States) Tony Stewart	Team Menard	Dallara	Oldsmobile	Report
6	Dover	(United States) Tony Stewart	(United States) Greg Ray	(United States) Scott Sharp	(United States) Scott Sharp	Kelley Racing	Dallara	Oldsmobile	Report
7	Charlotte	(United States) Tony Stewart	(Sweden) Kenny Bräck	(Sweden) Kenny Bräck	(Sweden) Kenny Bräck	A. J. Foyt Enterprises	Dallara	Oldsmobile	Report
8	Pikes Peak	(United States) Billy Boat	(United States) Jeff Ward	(United States) Jeff Ward	(Sweden) Kenny Bräck	A. J. Foyt Enterprises	Dallara	Oldsmobile	Report
9	Atlanta	(United States) Billy Boat	(United States) Billy Boat	(Canada) Scott Goodyear	(Sweden) Kenny Bräck	A. J. Foyt Enterprises	Dallara	Oldsmobile	Report
10	Texas 2	(United States) Billy Boat	(United States) Jeff Ward	(United States) Tony Stewart	(United States) John Paul Jr.	Byrd-Cunningham Racing	G-Force	Oldsmobile	Report
11	Las Vegas	(United States) Billy Boat	(Netherlands) Arie Luyendyk	(Netherlands) Arie Luyendyk	(Netherlands) Arie Luyendyk	Treadway Racing	G-Force	Oldsmobile	Report

== Race summaries ==
=== Indy 200 ===
The Indy 200 was held on January 24 at Walt Disney World Speedway. Qualifying was rained out, so Tony Stewart won the pole position due to the race being lined up by 1996–97 entrant standings for the first 20 positions and the remaining eight came from the best practice speeds of the remaining cars.

Top 10 results

1. 1- Tony Stewart
2. 35- Jeff Ward
3. 6- Davey Hamilton
4. 77- Stéphan Grégoire
5. 28- Mark Dismore
6. 8- Scott Sharp
7. 10- Mike Groff
8. 5- Arie Luyendyk
9. 99- Sam Schmidt
10. 18- John Paul Jr.
- Failed to qualify: 24-Billy Roe, 27-John Hollansworth Jr., 41-Affonso Giaffone and 53-Jim Guthrie

=== Dura-Lube 200 ===
The Dura-Lube 200 was held on March 22 at Phoenix International Raceway. Jeff Ward qualified on the pole position.

Top 10 results

1. 8- Scott Sharp
2. 1- Tony Stewart
3. 11- Billy Boat
4. 77- Stéphan Grégoire
5. 35- Jeff Ward
6. 4- Scott Goodyear
7. 99- Sam Schmidt
8. 30- Raul Boesel
9. 12- Buzz Calkins
10. 51- Eddie Cheever
- Failed to qualify: 19-Stan Wattles, 27-Robbie Groff, 40-Jack Miller and 53-Jim Guthrie

=== Indianapolis 500 ===
The Indianapolis 500 was held on May 24 at Indianapolis Motor Speedway. Billy Boat qualified on the pole position.

Top ten results

1. 51- Eddie Cheever
2. 91- Buddy Lazier
3. 55- Steve Knapp
4. 6- Davey Hamilton
5. 52- Robby Unser
6. 14- Kenny Bräck
7. 81- John Paul Jr.
8. 17- Andy Michner
9. 44- J. J. Yeley
10. 12- Buzz Calkins
- Failed to qualify: 10-Brian Tyler, 10, 20, 29-Joe Gosek, 15, 19-Eliseo Salazar, 20-Tyce Carlson, 23-Paul Durant, 24-Dan Drinan, 27-Claude Bourbonnais, 54-Hideshi Matsuda, 66-Scott Harrington, 68-Jaques Lazier, 81-Danny Ongais and 90-Lyn St. James
- Cheever became the first owner/driver to win the Indianapolis 500 since A. J. Foyt in 1977.
- Cheever, whose team was unsponsored prior to this race, planned to shut down his team after the race. However, he and teammate Robby Unser received sponsorship from Rachel's Gourmet Potato Chips. This, combined with Cheever's victory, kept the team open the rest of the season.
- Because St. James failed to qualify, the starting lineup consisted of only men for the first time since 1991.
- On the first lap, Yeley spun out and collected Cheever. Both recovered to finish in the top 10.
- Bräck ran out of fuel while leading. As a result, owner Foyt threw the laptop computer that said that Bräck had enough fuel in anger.

=== True Value 500 ===
The True Value 500 was held June 6 at Texas Motor Speedway. Tony Stewart qualified on the pole position.

Top 10 results

1. 11- Billy Boat
2. 97- Greg Ray
3. 14- Kenny Bräck
4. 4- Scott Goodyear
5. 8- Scott Sharp
6. 3- Robbie Buhl
7. 6- Davey Hamilton
8. 16- Marco Greco
9. 52- Robby Unser
10. 19- Stan Wattles
- Failed to qualify: 7-Jimmy Kite, 10-Mike Groff, 18-Jack Hewitt, 20-Tyce Carlson, 23-Paul Durant and 29-Joe Gosek
- Boat's only IndyCar win. He had been declared the winner at Texas the previous year, but a scoring error was discovered that resulted in Arie Luyendyk getting the win.
- John Paul Jr. replaced Groff at Byrd-Cunningham Racing for the remainder of the season.

=== New England 200 ===
The New England 200 was held on June 28 at New Hampshire International Speedway. Billy Boat qualified on the pole position.

Top ten results

1. 1- Tony Stewart
2. 4- Scott Goodyear
3. 8- Scott Sharp
4. 6- Davey Hamilton
5. 5- Arie Luyendyk
6. 15- Eliseo Salazar
7. 91- Buddy Lazier
8. 28- Mark Dismore
9. 51- Eddie Cheever
10. 3- Robbie Buhl
- Stewart's final IndyCar win.
- Boat was involved in a large crash lap 95 and missed the next two races.
- Team owner John Menard Jr. believed that A. J. Foyt Enterprises was cheating and withdrew his car driven by Robbie Buhl from the next two races. His other car, driven by Stewart, was not withdrawn as it was leading the point standings.

=== Pep Boys 400K ===
The Pep Boys 400K was held on July 19 at Dover Downs International Speedway. Tony Stewart qualified on the pole position.

Top 10 results

1. 8- Scott Sharp (248 laps)
2. 91- Buddy Lazier (248 laps)
3. 16- Marco Greco (246 laps)
4. 6- Davey Hamilton (246 laps)
5. 77- Stephan Gregoire (244 laps)
6. 4- Scott Goodyear (242 laps)
7. 23- Jim Guthrie (229 laps)
8. 1- Tony Stewart (220 laps)
9. 5- Arie Luyendyk (203 laps, DNF - Crash)
10. 14- Kenny Bräck (197 laps)
- Failed to qualify: 15-Eliseo Salazar
- Greg Ray replaced the injured Billy Boat. He started 7th, but crashed with Eddie Cheever on lap 104 and finished 15th.
- Only 10 (1st through 8th, 10th, and 12th) of the 22 starters were running at the finish.

=== VisionAire 500K ===
The VisionAire 500K was held on July 25 at Charlotte Motor Speedway. Tony Stewart qualified on the pole position.

Top 10 results

1. 14- Kenny Bräck (208 laps)
2. 35- Jeff Ward (208 laps)
3. 4- Scott Goodyear (208 laps)
4. 5- Arie Luyendyk (206 laps)
5. 16- Marco Greco (205 laps)
6. 10- John Paul Jr. (203 laps)
7. 6- Davey Hamilton (202 laps)
8. 77- Stéphan Grégoire (201 laps)
9. 40- Jack Miller (194 laps)
10. 21- Stevie Reeves (184 laps, DNF - CV Joint)
- Bräck's first IndyCar win.

=== Radisson 200 ===
The Radisson 200 was held August 16 at Pikes Peak International Raceway. Billy Boat qualified on the pole position.

Top 10 results

1. 14- Kenny Bräck
2. 3- Robbie Buhl
3. 1- Tony Stewart
4. 77- Stéphan Grégoire
5. 6- Davey Hamilton
6. 16- Marco Greco
7. 91- Buddy Lazier
8. 51- Eddie Cheever
9. 11- Billy Boat
10. 98- Donnie Beechler
- Boat returned in this race. He qualified on the pole position and finished 9th, one lap down.
- Buhl also returned in this race, finishing 2nd after starting 6th.

=== Atlanta 500 Classic ===
The Atlanta 500 Classic was held on August 29 at Atlanta Motor Speedway. Billy Boat qualified on the pole position.

Top 10 results

1. 14- Kenny Bräck
2. 6- Davey Hamilton
3. 51- Eddie Cheever
4. 4- Scott Goodyear
5. 1- Tony Stewart
6. 35- Jeff Ward
7. 28- Mark Dismore
8. 5- Arie Luyendyk
9. 15- Andy Michner
10. 30- Raul Boesel
- Only the top 10 finishers finished the race.

=== Lone Star 500 ===
The Lone Star 500 was held on September 20 at Texas Motor Speedway. Billy Boat qualified on the pole position.

Top 10 results

1. 10- John Paul Jr.
2. 52- Robby Unser
3. 35- Jeff Ward
4. 23- Roberto Guerrero
5. 14- Kenny Bräck
6. 91- Buddy Lazier
7. 3- Robbie Buhl
8. 19- Stan Wattles
9. 6- Davey Hamilton
10. 28- Mark Dismore
- Paul's second and final IndyCar win. 16 years earlier, he won the 1983 Michigan 500 at Michigan International Speedway.
- Entering the season finale, Bräck led Hamilton by 31 points and Tony Stewart by 41 points.

=== Las Vegas 500K ===
The Las Vegas 500K was held on October 11 at Las Vegas Motor Speedway. Billy Boat qualified on the pole position.

Top 10 results

1. 5- Arie Luyendyk
2. 99- Sam Schmidt
3. 91- Buddy Lazier
4. 10- John Paul Jr.
5. 51- Eddie Cheever
6. 81- Brian Tyler
7. 3- Robbie Buhl
8. 16- Marco Greco
9. 18- Steve Knapp
10. 14- Kenny Bräck
- Luyendyk's final IndyCar win. It would also be his final season as a full-time driver, as he would choose to go into semi-retirement in 1999.
- Of the championship contenders, Tony Stewart started 2nd, but spun on lap seven and finished 14th (30 laps down), Davey Hamilton was involved in a crash with Roberto Guerrero on lap 130, finishing 19th. Bräck cruised the rest of the way to finish 10th, six laps down, enough to win the championship.

== Points standings ==
Pos	Driver	WDW	PHX	INDY	TMS1	NHS	DOV	CHA	PPR	ATL	TMS2	LVS	Pts
1	(Sweden) Kenny Bräck	13	14	6	3	18	10	1*	1	1	5	10	332
2	(United States) Davey Hamilton	3	26	4	7	4	4	7	5	2	9	19	292
3	(United States) Tony Stewart	**1***	2*	33	**14**	1*	**8**	**21**	3	5	20*	14	289
4	(United States) Scott Sharp	6	1	16	5	3	1*	18	11	18	23	12	272
5	(United States) Buddy Lazier	15	28	2	11	7	2	13	7	17	6	3	262
6	(United States) Jeff Ward	2	**5**	13	17	22	19	2	20*	6	3	21	252
7	(Canada) Scott Goodyear	17	6	24	4	2	6	3	18	4*	22	22	244
8	(Netherlands) Arie Luyendyk	8	24	20	13	5	9	4	22	8	28	1*	227
9	(United States) Eddie Cheever	24	10	1*	26	9	16	20	8	3	25	5	222
10	(Brazil) Marco Greco	27	20	14	8	13	3	5	6	13	16	8	219
11	(United States) John Paul Jr.	10	19	7	16	26	21	6	15	23	1	4	216
12	(France) Stéphan Grégoire	4	4	17	25	24	5	8	4	20	26	17	201
13	(United States) Billy Boat	21	3	**23**	1*	**21**			**9**	**12**	**14**	**26**	194
14	(United States) Sam Schmidt	9	7	26	18	12	17	14	13	15	27	2	186
15	(United States) Mark Dismore	5	16	27	21	8	18	15	19	7	10	15	180
16	(United States) Robby Unser RY			5	9	11	11		12	16	2	16	176
17	(United States) Robbie Buhl	20	12	31	6	10			2	11	7	7	174
18	(United States) Brian Tyler R	19	17	DNQ		14	12	16	16	21	13	6	140
19	(United States) Buzz Calkins	14	9	10	15	15	Wth		24	28	11	11	134
20	(Brazil) Raul Boesel	18	8	19	28	19	14	24	25	10	17	18	132
21	(United States) Greg Ray	25	11	18	2		15	17		24	21	25	128
22	(United States) Steve Knapp R			3			13		14	14	18	9	118
23	(United States) Dr. Jack Miller	23	DNQ	21	22	16	20	9	23	27	12	28	100
24	(United States) Andy Michner R			8				12	17	9	15		92
25	(United States) Stan Wattles	22	DNQ	28	10	17			Wth	26	8	13	88
26	(Colombia) Roberto Guerrero	26	27	22	24				21	19	4	20	83
27	(United States) Tyce Carlson	11	13	DNQ	12			11					73
28	(United States) Donnie Beechler R			32	27	20		19	10	22	19	23	71
29	(Chile) Eliseo Salazar	12	23	DNQ	23	6	Wth						60
30	(United States) Mike Groff	7	15	15									56
31	(United States) Jimmy Kite	16	18	11				23					52
32	(United States) J. J. Yeley R		25	9	19	23				25			50
33	(United States) Jim Guthrie	DNQ	DNQ	29			7	22				24	41
34	(United States) Jack Hewitt R			12		25							23
35	(United States) Stevie Reeves R							10					20
36	(United States) Dave Steele R		22								24	27	17
37	(United States) Billy Roe	DNQ		30	20								11
38	(United States) Paul Durant		21	DNQ									9
39	(United States) Scott Harrington R			DNQ			22						8
40	(United States) Johnny Unser			25									5
41	(United States) Robbie Groff	28	DNQ										2
–	(Brazil) Affonso Giaffone	DNQ											0
–	(Canada) Claude Bourbonnais			DNQ									0
–	(United States) Dan Drinan R			DNQ									0
–	(United States) Joe Gosek R			DNQ									0
–	(Japan) Hideshi Matsuda			DNQ									0
–	(United States) Lyn St. James			DNQ									0
–	(United States) Danny Ongais			Wth									0
Pos	Driver	WDW	PHX	INDY	TMS1	NHS	DOV	CHA	PPR	ATL	TMS2	LVS	Pts

Color	Result
Gold	Winner
Silver	2nd place
Bronze	3rd place
Green	4th & 5th place
Light Blue	6th–10th place
Dark Blue	Finished (Outside Top 10)
Purple	Did not finish (Ret)
Red	Did not qualify (DNQ)
Brown	Withdrawn (Wth)
Black	Disqualified (DSQ)
White	Did not start (DNS)
Blank	Did not participate (DNP)
Blank	Not competing

**In-line notation**
**Bold**	Pole position (2 points)
Italics	Ran fastest race lap
*	Led most race laps (1 point)
DNS	Any driver who qualifies but does not start (DNS), earns all the points had they taken part.
RY	Rookie of the Year
R	Rookie

- Ties in points broken by number of wins, followed by number of 2nds, 3rds, etc., and then by number of pole positions, followed by number of times qualified 2nd, etc.

Additional points were awarded to the pole winner (3 points), the second best qualifier (2 points), the third best qualifier (1 point) and to the driver leading the most laps (2 point).

Notes:
Orlando: No additional points for the qualifying were awarded due to rain; starting grid were determined by 1996–97 entrant points for the first 20 positions and the remaining eight went to top practice times from Thursday.
Phoenix: Scott Sharp had 7 points deduction, because his car failed the post-race fuel capacity inspection.
Pikes Peak: Tony Stewart and Robbie Buhl had 15 points deduction each, because the rear wings of both Team Menard cars were found to be in violation of technical specifications.

== See also ==
- 1998 Indianapolis 500
- 1998 Indy Lights season
- 1998 CART season
- 1998 Toyota Atlantic Championship season
- http://champcarstats.com/year/1998i.htm
- http://media.indycar.com/pdf/2011/IICS_2011_Historical_Record_Book_INT6.pdf (p. 140–141)

== Bibliography ==
- Johnson, Paul, ed. (1998). Indy Review 1998, Volume 8: Complete Coverage of the 1998 Indy Racing League Season. St. Paul, MN: MBI Publishing Company. ISBN 978-0-7603-0593-5.
