= Brian Tyler (racing driver) =

American auto racing driver (born 1967)

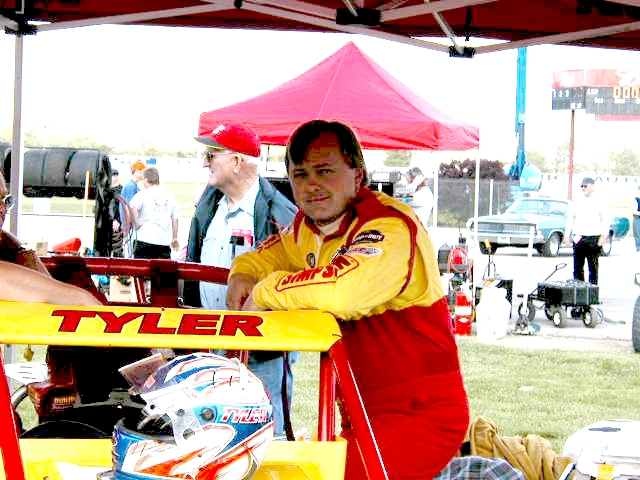
- Tyler in 2003
- Born: October 27, 1967 (age 59); Albion, Michigan, U.S.
- Achievements: 1996, 1997 USAC Sprint Car Series Champion; 2006 USAC Payless Little 500, Anderson, IN. Winner.
- Awards: 1997 USAC Silver Crown Series Most Improved Driver; Inducted into the Michigan Motorsports Hall of Fame in 2007

NASCAR O'Reilly Auto Parts Series career
- 9 races run over 4 years
- Best finish: 63rd (2001)
- First race: 2001 Sam's Town 300 (Las Vegas)
- Last race: 2005 Kroger 200 (IRP)
Wins	Top tens	Poles
0	0	0

NASCAR FedEx Freight Truck Series career
- 1 race run over 1 year
- Best finish: 104th (2002)
- First race: 2002 Michigan 200 (Michigan)
Wins	Top tens	Poles
0	0	0

IndyCar Series career
- 10 races run over 2 years
- Best finish: 18th (1998)
- First race: 1998 Indy 200 (Disney)
- Last race: 1999 TransWorld Diversified Services Indy 200 (Disney)
Wins	Podiums	Poles
0	0	0
- Statistics up to date as of November 17, 2019.

Brian Tyler (born October 27, 1967) is an American auto racing driver.

Tyler was a back-to-back USAC National Sprint car Champion for Larry Contos Racing in 1996 and 1997. He made ten starts in the Indy Racing League IndyCar Series in 1998 and 1999 for three different teams with a best finish of sixth at the Las Vegas Motor Speedway. He attempted, but failed to qualify for the Indianapolis 500 both those years.

Tyler has nine NASCAR Busch Series starts, and one NASCAR Craftsman Truck Series start, all made between 2001 and 2005. He also has eleven ARCA stock car starts to his credit.

Tyler continues to race in the USAC Silver Crown Series and make occasional ARCA appearances. He finished seventh in the USAC Silver Crown National Championship in 2010

== Awards ==
- 1997 USAC Sprint Car Series Champion
- 1997 USAC Silver Crown Series Most Improved Driver
- 1996 USAC Sprint Car Series Champion
- 2006 USAC Payless Little 500, Anderson, IN. Winner.
- Inducted into the Michigan Motorsports Hall of Fame in 2007

== Motorsports career results ==
=== Indy Racing League ===
(key) (Races in bold indicate pole position; races in italics indicate fastest lap)

Year	Team	Chassis	No.	Engine	1	2	3	4	5	6	7	8	9	10	11	Rank	Points	Ref
1998	Chitwood Motorsports	Dallara IR8	17	Oldsmobile	WDW; 19	PHX; 17										18th	140	
1998	Byrd-Cunningham Racing	G-Force GF01B	10	Oldsmobile			INDY; Rpl	TXS								18th	140	
1998	Team Pelfrey	Dallara IR8	81	Oldsmobile Aurora V8					NHM; 14	DOV; 12	CLT; 16	PPIR; 16	ATL; 21	TX2; 13	LVS; 6	18th	140	
1999	Truscelli Team Racing	G-Force GF01C	33	Oldsmobile Aurora V8	WDW; 14	PHX	CLT									37th	16	
1999	ISM Racing	G-Force GF01C	36	Oldsmobile Aurora V8				INDY; DNQ	TXS	PPI	ATL	DOV	PP2	LVS	TX2	37th	16	

=== Indianapolis 500 ===
Year	Chassis	Engine	Start	Finish	Team
1998	G-Force GF01B	Oldsmobile Aurora V8	Raced by Mike Groff		Byrd-Cunningham Racing
1999	G-Force GF01C	Oldsmobile Aurora V8	DNQ		ISM Racing

=== NASCAR ===
(key) (Bold – Pole position awarded by qualifying time. Italics – Pole position earned by points standings or practice time. * – Most laps led.)

==== Busch Series ====
NASCAR Busch Series results
Year	Team	No.	Make	1	2	3	4	5	6	7	8	9	10	11	12	13	14	15	16	17	18	19	20	21	22	23	24	25	26	27	28	29	30	31	32	33	34	35	NBSC	Pts	Ref
2000	Jay Robinson Racing	49	Chevy	DAY	CAR	LVS	ATL	DAR	BRI	TEX	NSV	TAL	CAL	RCH	NHA	CLT	DOV	SBO	MYB	GLN	MLW	NZH	PPR	GTY	IRP; DNQ	MCH	BRI	DAR	RCH	DOV	CLT	CAR	MEM	PHO	HOM				N/A	-	
2001	Jay Robinson Racing	49	Chevy	DAY	CAR	LVS; 33	ATL	DAR	BRI	TEX	NSH	TAL	CAL	RCH	NHA	NZH	CLT	DOV	KEN	MLW	GLN	CHI	GTY	PPR															63rd	344	
2001	Jay Robinson Racing	49	Pontiac																						IRP; 26														63rd	344	
2001	Jay Robinson Racing	49	Ford																							MCH; 39	BRI	DAR	RCH	DOV	KAN	CLT							63rd	344	
2001	PF2 Motorsports	94	Chevy																														MEM; 24	PHO	CAR; 35	HOM; DNQ			63rd	344	
2003	Bost Motorsports	22	Chevy	DAY	CAR	LVS	DAR	BRI	TEX	TAL	NSH	CAL	RCH	GTY	NZH	CLT	DOV	NSH	KEN	MLW	DAY	CHI	NHA	PPR	IRP; 23	MCH	BRI	DAR	RCH	DOV	KAN	CLT							113th	128	
2003	PF2 Motorsports	94	Chevy																														MEM; 43	ATL	PHO	CAR	HOM		113th	128	
2004	Woodland Racing	40	Chevy	DAY	CAR	LVS	DAR	BRI	TEX	NSH	TAL	CAL	GTY	RCH	NZH	CLT	DOV	NSH	KEN	MLW	DAY	CHI	NHA	PPR	IRP; 42	MCH	BRI	CAL	RCH	DOV	KAN	CLT	MEM	ATL	PHO	DAR	HOM		148th	37	
2005	Woodland Racing	80	Chevy	DAY	CAL	MXC	LVS	ATL	NSH	BRI	TEX	PHO	TAL	DAR	RCH	CLT	DOV	NSH	KEN	MLW	DAY	CHI	NHA	PPR	GTY	IRP; 41	GLN	MCH	BRI	CAL	RCH	DOV	KAN	CLT	MEM; DNQ	TEX	PHO	HOM	140th	40	

==== Craftsman Truck Series ====
NASCAR Craftsman Truck Series results
Year	Team	No.	Make	1	2	3	4	5	6	7	8	9	10	11	12	13	14	15	16	17	18	19	20	21	22	NCTC	Pts	Ref
2002	Team Racing	25	Chevy	DAY	DAR	MAR	GTY	PPR	DOV	TEX	MEM	MLW	KAN	KEN	NHA	MCH; 35	IRP	NSH	RCH	TEX	SBO	LVS	CAL	PHO	HOM	104th	58	

=== ARCA Racing Series ===
(key) (Bold – Pole position awarded by qualifying time. Italics – Pole position earned by points standings or practice time. * – Most laps led.)

ARCA Racing Series results
Year	Team	No.	Make	1	2	3	4	5	6	7	8	9	10	11	12	13	14	15	16	17	18	19	20	21	22	23	ARSC	Pts	Ref
2005	Woodland Racing	10	Chevy	DAY	NSH	SLM	KEN	TOL; 6	LAN	MIL	POC	MCH	KAN	KEN													40th	920	
2005	Woodland Racing	48	Chevy												BLN; 2	POC	GTW	LER	NSH	MCH	ISF	TOL; 6	**DSF**; 26	CHI	SLM	TAL; 12	40th	920	
2006	Woodland Racing	22	Chevy	DAY; 22	NSH	SLM	WIN	KEN	TOL	POC	MCH	KAN	KEN	BLN	POC	GTW	NSH	MCH	ISF	MIL	TOL	DSF	CHI	SLM	TAL	IOW	134th	120	
2008	Hattori Woodland Racing	01	Toyota	DAY; DNQ	SLM	IOW	KAN	CAR	KEN	TOL	POC	MCH	CAY	KEN	BLN	POC	NSH										75th	315	
2008	Woodland Racing	25	Toyota															ISF; 3	DSF; 31	CHI	SLM	NJM	TAL	TOL			75th	315	
2009	Stringer Motorsports	90	Chevy	DAY	SLM	CAR	TAL	KEN	TOL	POC	MCH	MFD	IOW	KEN	BLN	POC	ISF; 30	CHI	TOL	DSF; 8	NJM	SLM	KAN	CAR			87th	260	
2010	Hixson Motorsports	23	Chevy	DAY	PBE	SLM	TEX	TAL	TOL	POC; 31	MCH	IOW	MFD	POC	BLN	NJM	ISF	CHI	DSF	TOL	SLM	KAN	CAR				128th	75	
