= 1998 Atlanta 500 Classic =

(United States) 1998 Atlanta
Race details
- 9th round of the 1998 Indy Racing League season
- Date: August 29, 1998
- Official name: Atlanta 500 Classic
- Location: Atlanta Motor Speedway
- Course: Permanent racing facility 1.54 mi / 2.48 km
- Distance: 208 laps 320.32 mi / 515.505 km

Pole position
- Driver: (United States) Billy Boat (A. J. Foyt Enterprises)
- Time: 24.734

Fastest lap
- Driver: (United States) Billy Boat (A. J. Foyt Enterprises)
- Time: 24.732 (on lap 109 of 208)

Podium
- First: (Sweden) Kenny Bräck (A. J. Foyt Enterprises)
- Second: (United States) Davey Hamilton (Nienhouse Motorsports)
- Third: (United States) Eddie Cheever (Team Cheever)

The 1998 Atlanta 500 Classic was the ninth round of the 1998 Indy Racing League season. The race was held on August 29, 1998 at the 1.54 mi (2.48 km) Atlanta Motor Speedway in Hampton, Georgia. Sophomore Kenny Bräck took his third consecutive win after surging into the lead during the final sections of the 208-lap race ahead of Davey Hamilton, whose second place would be his best result of the season. Both Bräck and Hamilton jumped ahead of Scott Sharp in the points standings into first and second place, respectively, after Sharp suffered a gearbox malfunction and finished 18th. Polesitter Billy Boat, despite setting the fastest lap of the race, was taken out in a crash involving Marco Greco and Steve Knapp on Lap 167.

== Report ==
Key	Meaning
R	Rookie
W	Past winner

=== Qualifying ===
Two laps qualifying. The worst lap from some of the drivers are unknown.

Pos	No.	Name	Lap 1	Lap 2	Best (in mph)
1	11	(United States) Billy Boat	24.738	24.734	224.145
2	35	(United States) Jeff Ward	24.771	24.753	223.973
3	8	(United States) Scott Sharp	24.807	24.768	223.837
4	4	(Canada) Scott Goodyear	24.794	24.778	223.747
5	28	(United States) Mark Dismore	24.843	24.847	223.161
6	14	(Sweden) Kenny Bräck	24.886	24.848	223.117
7	16	(Brazil) Marco Greco	24.992	24.969	222.035
8	77	(France) Stéphan Grégoire	25.050	unknown	221.317
9	5	(Netherlands) Arie Luyendyk	25.063	25.081	221.203
10	6	(United States) Davey Hamilton	25.135	25.097	220.903
11	51	(United States) Eddie Cheever	25.211	25.230	219.904
12	12	(United States) Buzz Calkins	25.274	25.245	219.608
13	52	(United States) Robby Unser R	25.338	unknown	218.802
14	15	(United States) Andy Michner R	25.359	unknown	218.621
15	30	(Brazil) Raul Boesel	25.383	25.414	218.414
16	97	(United States) Greg Ray	25.464	25.482	217.719
17	10	(United States) John Paul Jr.	25.553	25.495	217.454
18	91	(United States) Buddy Lazier	25.503	unknown	217.386
19	18	(United States) Steve Knapp R	25.588	25.555	216.944
20	19	(United States) Stan Wattles	25.701	25.655	216.098
21	3	(United States) Robbie Buhl	25.685	unknown	215.846
22	99	(United States) Sam Schmidt	25.777	25.740	215.385
23	81	(United States) Brian Tyler R	25.853	25.846	214.501
24	98	(United States) Donnie Beechler R	25.909	unknown	213.980
25	1	(United States) Tony Stewart	25.961	unknown	213.543
26	44	(United States) J. J. Yeley R	26.077	26.102	212.601
27	40	(United States) Jack Miller^{1}	Didn't qualify		No speed
28	23	(Colombia) Roberto Guerrero^{1}	Didn't qualify		No speed

1. Didn't qualify, but were allowed to start the race at the back of the field.

==== Failed to qualify or withdrew ====
- (United States) Stevie Reeves R for Pagan Racing - the team withdrew the entry on Thursday, before the start of practice sessions.

=== Race ===
Pos	No.	Driver	Team	Laps	Time/Retired	Grid	Laps Led	Points
1	14	(Sweden) Kenny Bräck	A. J. Foyt Enterprises	208	2:17:05.289	6	17	50
2	6	(United States) Davey Hamilton	Nienhouse Motorsports	208	+0.944 sec	10	19	40
3	51	(United States) Eddie Cheever	Team Cheever	208	Running	11		35
4	4	(Canada) Scott Goodyear	Panther Racing	208	Running	4	93	34
5	1	(United States) Tony Stewart	Team Menard	208	Running	25	12	30
6	35	(United States) Jeff Ward	ISM Racing	208	Running	2	64	30
7	28	(United States) Mark Dismore	Kelley Racing	208	Running	5		26
8	5	(Netherlands) Arie Luyendyk	Treadway Racing	207	+1 Lap	9		24
9	15	(United States) Andy Michner R	Riley & Scott	206	+2 Laps	14		22
10	30	(Brazil) Raul Boesel	McCormack Motorsports	202	+6 Laps	15		20
11	3	(United States) Robbie Buhl	Team Menard	185	Clutch	21		19
12	11	(United States) Billy Boat	A. J. Foyt Enterprises	169	Contact	1		21
13	16	(Brazil) Marco Greco	Phoenix Racing	167	Contact	7	3	17
14	18	(United States) Steve Knapp R	PDM Racing	167	Contact	19		16
15	99	(United States) Sam Schmidt	LP Racing	158	Engine	22		15
16	52	(United States) Robby Unser R	Team Cheever	143	Contact	13		14
17	91	(United States) Buddy Lazier	Hemelgarn Racing	136	Engine	18		13
18	8	(United States) Scott Sharp	Kelley Racing	135	Gearbox	3		13
19	23	(Colombia) Roberto Guerrero	Cobb Racing	133	Clutch	28		11
20	77	(France) Stéphan Grégoire	Chastain Motorsports	131	Contact	8		10
21	81	(United States) Brian Tyler R	Team Pelfrey	123	Engine	23		9
22	98	(United States) Donnie Beechler R	Cahill Racing	110	Engine	24		8
23	10	(United States) John Paul Jr.	Byrd-Cunningham Racing	96	Contact	17		7
24	97	(United States) Greg Ray	Knapp Motorsports	94	Contact	16		6
25	44	(United States) J. J. Yeley R	Sinden Racing Services	58	Engine	26		5
26	19	(United States) Stan Wattles	Metro Racing Systems	29	Engine	19		4
27	40	(United States) Jack Miller	Sinden Racing Services	15	Electrical	27		3
28	12	(United States) Buzz Calkins	Bradley Motorsports	2	Brakes	12		2

== Race Statistics ==
- Lead changes: 12 among 6 drivers

Lap Leaders
Laps	Leader
1-27	Jeff Ward
28-46	Scott Goodyear
47-48	Marco Greco
49-97	Scott Goodyear
98	Marco Greco
99-110	Tony Stewart
111-135	Scott Goodyear
136-151	Davey Hamilton
152-154	Kenny Bräck
155-165	Jeff Ward
166-168	Davey Hamilton
169-194	Jeff Ward
194-208	Kenny Bräck

Cautions: 6 for 56 laps
Laps	Reason
54-59	Track lights malfunction
63-71	J. J. Yeley's engine leaks oil on the track
95-107	Greg Ray crash / John Paul Jr. crash
133-140	Stéphan Grégoire crash
164-168	Sam Schmidt's engine leaks oil on the track
170-184	Knapp, Greco, Unser and Boat crash

== Standings after the race ==
Drivers' Championship standings

Rank	+/–	Driver	Points
1	1	(Sweden) Kenny Bräck	282
2	2	(United States) Davey Hamilton	259
3		(United States) Tony Stewart	257
4	3	(United States) Scott Sharp	246
5		(Canada) Scott Goodyear	228

- Note: Only the top five positions are included for the standings.
