= 1998 Lone Star 500 =

(United States) 1998 Texas II
Race details
- 10th round of the 1998 Indy Racing League season
- Date: September 20, 1998
- Official name: Lone Star 500
- Location: Texas Motor Speedway
- Course: Permanent racing facility 1.500 mi / 2.414 km
- Distance: 208 laps 312.000 mi / 502.115 km

Pole position
- Driver: (United States) Billy Boat (A. J. Foyt Enterprises)
- Time: 23.896

Fastest lap
- Driver: (United States) Jeff Ward (ISM Racing)
- Time: 24.081 (on lap unknown of 208)

Podium
- First: (United States) John Paul Jr. (Byrd-Cunningham Racing)
- Second: (United States) Robby Unser (Team Cheever)
- Third: (United States) Jeff Ward (ISM Racing)

The 1998 Lone Star 500 was the tenth round of the 1998 Indy Racing League season. The race was held on September 20, 1998 at the 1.50 mi (2.41 km) Texas Motor Speedway in Fort Worth, Texas. Open-wheel veteran John Paul Jr. earned his first win since the 1983 Michigan 500 in a race determined by attrition and fuel strategy. It would be Paul's only win in his IRL career and the only win for Byrd-Cunningham Racing in the series. Rookie Robby Unser scored his first and only podium as well as led the only laps in his career.

The race saw many crashes and problems plague the usual frontrunners, including Arie Luyendyk (fuel pump), Eddie Cheever (engine malfunction), Scott Sharp (crash), Greg Ray (engine malfunction), and Tony Stewart (led 51 laps before an engine problem ended his race). By finishing 5th, points leader Kenny Bräck maintained his comfortable lead in the points standings, all but ensuring he would be the next IRL champion in the next race.

== Report ==
Key	Meaning
R	Rookie
W	Past winner

=== Qualifying ===
Two laps qualifying. The worst lap from any of the drivers are unknown.

Pos	No.	Name	Lap	Best (in mph)
1	11	(United States) Billy Boat W	23.896	225.979
2	1	(United States) Tony Stewart	24.014	224.869
3	8	(United States) Scott Sharp	24.048	224.551
4	28	(United States) Mark Dismore	24.075	224.299
5	35	(United States) Jeff Ward	24.099	224.076
6	6	(United States) Davey Hamilton	24.142	223.677
7	4	(Canada) Scott Goodyear	24.240	222.770
8	77	(France) Stéphan Grégoire	24.288	222.332
9	51	(United States) Eddie Cheever	24.295	222.268
10	14	(Sweden) Kenny Bräck	24.304	222.186
11	43	(United States) Dave Steele R	24.319	222.049
12	97	(United States) Greg Ray	24.333	221.921
13	30	(Brazil) Raul Boesel	24.387	221.429
14	10	(United States) John Paul Jr.	24.394	221.366
15	16	(Brazil) Marco Greco	24.398	221.330
16	3	(United States) Robbie Buhl	24.451	220.850
17	52	(United States) Robby Unser R	24.454	220.823
18	23	(Colombia) Roberto Guerrero	24.491	220.489
19	91	(United States) Buddy Lazier	24.499	220.417
20	18	(United States) Steve Knapp R	24.669	218.898
21	12	(United States) Buzz Calkins	24.723	218.420
22	40	(United States) Jack Miller	24.821	217.558
23	99	(United States) Sam Schmidt	24.857	217.243
24	81	(United States) Brian Tyler R	24.900	216.867
25	98	(United States) Donnie Beechler R	25.040	215.655
26	19	(United States) Stan Wattles	25.387	212.707
27	15	(United States) Andy Michner R	26.119	206.746
28	5	(Netherlands) Arie Luyendyk^{1} W	24.585	219.646

1. Changed to a backup car for the race, after repeatedly changing engines during the weekend before loaning one from Panther Racing.

=== Race ===
Pos	No.	Driver	Team	Laps	Time/Retired	Grid	Laps Led	Points
1	10	(United States) John Paul Jr.	Byrd-Cunningham Racing	208	2:21:53.557	14	31	50
2	52	(United States) Robby Unser R	Team Cheever	208	+1.577 sec	17	22	40
3	35	(United States) Jeff Ward	ISM Racing	208	Running	5	16	35
4	23	(Colombia) Roberto Guerrero	Cobb Racing	208	Running	18	22	32
5	5	(Sweden) Kenny Bräck	A. J. Foyt Enterprises	207	+1 Lap	10		30
6	91	(United States) Buddy Lazier	Hemelgarn Racing	206	+2 Laps	19	14	28
7	3	(United States) Robbie Buhl	Team Menard	205	+3 Laps	16		26
8	19	(United States) Stan Wattles	Metro Racing Systems	205	+3 Laps	26		24
9	6	(United States) Davey Hamilton	Nienhouse Motorsports	202	+6 Laps	6		22
10	28	(United States) Mark Dismore	Kelley Racing	202	+6 Laps	4	14	20
11	12	(United States) Buzz Calkins	Bradley Motorsports	201	+7 Laps	21		19
12	40	(United States) Jack Miller	Sinden Racing Services	201	+7 Laps	22		18
13	81	(United States) Brian Tyler R	Team Pelfrey	174	Engine	24		17
14	11	(United States) Billy Boat W	A. J. Foyt Enterprises	162	+46 Laps	1		19
15	15	(United States) Andy Michner R	Riley & Scott	158	Engine	27	7	15
16	16	(Brazil) Marco Greco	Phoenix Racing	133	Contact	15		14
17	30	(Brazil) Raul Boesel	McCormack Motorsports	133	Contact	13	30	13
18	18	(United States) Steve Knapp R	PDM Racing	131	Contact	20		12
19	98	(United States) Donnie Beechler R	Cahill Racing	122	Contact	25		11
20	1	(United States) Tony Stewart	Team Menard	80	Engine	2	51	14
21	97	(United States) Greg Ray	Knapp Motorsports	75	Engine	12		9
22	4	(Canada) Scott Goodyear	Panther Racing	71	Clutch	7		8
23	8	(United States) Scott Sharp	Kelley Racing	67	Contact	3	1	8
24	43	(United States) Dave Steele R	Panther Racing	39	Contact	11		6
25	51	(United States) Eddie Cheever	Team Cheever	30	Engine	9		5
26	77	(France) Stéphan Grégoire	Chastain Motorsports	18	Contact	8		4
27	99	(United States) Sam Schmidt	LP Racing	5	Engine	23		3
28	5	(Netherlands) Arie Luyendyk W	Treadway Racing	5	Fuel Pump	28		2

== Race Statistics ==
- Lead changes: 17 among 10 drivers

Lap Leaders
Laps	Leader
1-27	Tony Stewart
28-41	Mark Dismore
42	Jeff Ward
43-50	Raul Boesel
51	Scott Sharp
52-75	Tony Stewart
76-80	Jeff Ward
81-87	John Paul Jr.
88-109	Raul Boesel
110-116	Andy Michner
117-130	Buddy Lazier
131-136	John Paul Jr.
137-140	Roberto Guerrero
141-162	Robby Unser
163	John Paul Jr.
164-182	Roberto Guerrero
183-191	Jeff Ward
192-208	John Paul Jr.

Cautions: 8 for 74 laps
Laps	Reason
19-27	Stéphane Grégoire crash
40-48	Dave Steele crash
70-78	Scott Sharp crash
85-92	Debris
108-116	Billy Boat crash
134-152	Greco, Boesel, Beechler and Knapp crash
160-164	Tow-in for Andy Michner
198-202	Davey Hamilton's tire blow-out

== Standings after the race ==
Drivers' Championship standings

Rank	+/–	Driver	Points
1		(Sweden) Kenny Bräck	312
2		(United States) Davey Hamilton	281
3		(United States) Tony Stewart	271
4		(United States) Scott Sharp	254
5	1	(United States) Jeff Ward	243

- Note: Only the top five positions are included for the standings.
