= 1998 Las Vegas 500K =

(United States) 1998 Las Vegas
Race details
- 11th round of the 1998 Indy Racing League season
- Date: October 11, 1998
- Official name: Las Vegas 500K
- Location: Las Vegas Motor Speedway
- Course: Permanent racing facility 1.500 mi / 2.414 km
- Distance: 208 laps 312.000 mi / 502.115 km

Pole position
- Driver: (United States) Billy Boat (A. J. Foyt Enterprises)
- Time: 25.167

Fastest lap
- Driver: (United States) Arie Luyendyk (Treadway Racing)
- Time: 26.167 (on lap unknown out of 208)

Podium
- First: (Netherlands) Arie Luyendyk (Treadway Racing)
- Second: (United States) Sam Schmidt (LP Racing)
- Third: (United States) Buddy Lazier (Hemelgarn Racing)

The 1998 Las Vegas 500K was the eleventh and final round of the 1998 Indy Racing League. The race was held on October 11, 1998 at the 1.500 mi (2.414 km) Las Vegas Motor Speedway in Las Vegas, Nevada.

== Report ==
Key	Meaning
R	Rookie
W	Past winner

=== Qualifying ===
Two laps qualifying. The worst lap from any of the drivers are unknown.

Pos	No.	Name	Lap	Best (in mph)
1	11	(United States) Billy Boat	25.167	214.567
2	1	(United States) Tony Stewart	25.360	212.934
3	16	(Brazil) Marco Greco	25.432	212.331
4	97	(United States) Greg Ray	25.439	212.272
5	3	(United States) Robbie Buhl	25.466	212.047
6	14	(Sweden) Kenny Bräck	25.506	211.715
7	10	(United States) John Paul Jr.	25.531	211.508
8	35	(United States) Jeff Ward	25.543	211.408
9	28	(United States) Mark Dismore	25.557	211.292
10	51	(United States) Eddie Cheever	25.564	211.235
11	8	(United States) Scott Sharp	25.617	210.798
12	12	(United States) Buzz Calkins	25.787	209.408
13	6	(United States) Davey Hamilton	25.790	209.383
14	5	(Netherlands) Arie Luyendyk	25.843	208.954
15	4	(Canada) Scott Goodyear	25.880	208.655
16	98	(United States) Donnie Beechler R	25.898	208.510
17	91	(United States) Buddy Lazier	25.925	208.293
18	23	(Colombia) Roberto Guerrero	25.931	208.245
19	15	(United States) Jim Guthrie	25.932	208.237
20	30	(Brazil) Raul Boesel	25.946	208.125
21	18	(United States) Steve Knapp R	26.071	207.127
22	81	(United States) Brian Tyler R	26.222	205.934
23	99	(United States) Sam Schmidt	26.303	205.300
24	77	(France) Stéphan Grégoire	26.445	204.197
25	19	(United States) Stan Wattles	26.540	203.466
26	43	(United States) Dave Steele R	26.770	201.718
27	52	(United States) Robby Unser^{1} R	No time	No speed
28	40	(United States) Jack Miller^{2}	No time	No speed

1. Couldn't qualify due to an unscheduled engine change. He was allowed to start the race at the back of the field.
2. Waved off his qualifying attempt after two warm-up laps. He was allowed to start the race at the back of the field.

=== Race ===
Pos	No.	Driver	Team	Laps	Time/Retired	Grid	Laps Led	Points
1	5	(Netherlands) Arie Luyendyk	Treadway Racing	208	2:18:19.202	14	88	52
2	99	(United States) Sam Schmidt	LP Racing	208	+ 0.926 sec	23	0	40
3	91	(United States) Buddy Lazier	Hemelgarn Racing	208	Running	17	60	35
4	10	(United States) John Paul Jr.	Byrd-Cunningham Racing	208	Running	7	8	32
5	51	(United States) Eddie Cheever	Team Cheever	207	+ 1 lap	10	3	30
6	81	(United States) Brian Tyler R	Team Pelfrey	207	+ 1 lap	22	0	28
7	3	(United States) Robbie Buhl	Team Menard	206	+ 2 laps	5	0	26
8	16	(Brazil) Marco Greco	Phoenix Racing	206	+ 2 laps	3	0	25
9	18	(United States) Steve Knapp R	PDM Racing	204	+ 4 laps	21	0	22
10	14	(Sweden) Kenny Bräck	A. J. Foyt Enterprises	202	+ 6 laps	6	0	20
11	12	(United States) Buzz Calkins	Bradley Motorsports	202	+ 6 laps	12	0	19
12	8	(United States) Scott Sharp	Kelley Racing	198	+ 10 laps	11	0	18
13	19	(United States) Stan Wattles	Metro Racing Systems	187	Accident	25	0	17
14	1	(United States) Tony Stewart	Team Menard	178	+ 30 laps	2	0	18
15	28	(United States) Mark Dismore	Kelley Racing	176	Suspension	9	0	15
16	52	(United States) Robby Unser R	Team Pelfrey	174	Engine	27	0	14
17	77	(France) Stéphan Grégoire	Chastain Motorsports	160	+ 48 laps	24	0	13
18	30	(Brazil) Raul Boesel	McCormack Motorsports	144	Timing chain	20	0	12
19	6	(United States) Davey Hamilton	Nienhouse Motorsports	124	Accident	13	0	11
20	23	(Colombia) Roberto Guerrero	CBR Cobb Racing	123	Accident	18	0	10
21	35	(United States) Jeff Ward	ISM Racing	120	Accident	8	21	9
22	4	(Canada) Scott Goodyear	Panther Racing	117	Accident	15	0	8
23	98	(United States) Donnie Beechler R	Cahill Auto Racing	107	Accident	16	1	7
24	15	(United States) Jim Guthrie	Riley & Scott Cars	90	Suspension	19	0	6
25	97	(United States) Greg Ray	Knapp Motorsports	76	Handling	4	0	5
26	11	(United States) Billy Boat	A. J. Foyt Enterprises	51	Accident	1	27	7
27	43	(United States) Dave Steele R	Panther Racing	42	Suspension	26	0	3
28	40	(United States) Jack Miller	Sinden Racing Services	38	Handling	28	0	2

== Race Statistics ==
- Lead changes: 13 among 7 drivers

Lap Leaders
Laps	Leader
1-27	Billy Boat
28-38	Jeff Ward
39-41	Eddie Cheever
42-46	Arie Luyendyk
47	Donnie Beechler
48-49	Arie Luyendyk
50-97	Buddy Lazier
98-99	Arie Luyendyk
100-109	Jeff Ward
110-112	John Paul Jr.
113-124	Buddy Lazier
125-163	Arie Luyendyk
164-168	John Paul Jr.
169-208	Arie Luyendyk

Cautions: 10 for 68 laps
Laps	Reason
7-11	Tony Stewart spin
15-18	Debris
45-48	Dave Steele's brush with the wall
54-63	Billy Boat crash
110-119	Donnie Beechler crash
120-129	Jeff Ward and Scott Goodyear crash
130-138	Davey Hamilton and Roberto Guerrero crash
165-171	Stan Wattles spin
180-182	Debris
198-203	Stan Wattles crash

== Standings after the race ==
Drivers' Championship standings

Pos	+/–	Driver	Points
1		(Sweden) Kenny Bräck	332
2		(United States) Davey Hamilton	292
3		(United States) Tony Stewart	289
4		(United States) Scott Sharp	272
5	2	(United States) Buddy Lazier	262

- Note: Only the top five positions are included for the standings.
