= Robby Unser =

American racing driver

Robby Unser (born January 12, 1968) is an American former racing driver. Unser won the 1989 American Indycar Series championship, and was nine-time winner of the Pikes Peak International Hillclimb. He raced in the Indy Racing League, and was the IRL rookie of the year in 1998. Unser made two starts in the Indianapolis 500 with a best finish of fifth in 1998. He also finished second twice in the 1998 season, his best IRL finish. His last IRL start came in 2000, his 21st IRL race.

Unser made his drifting debut in the 2007 Formula D season driving for Enjuku Racing. The team had its first win in Denver on June 29, 2007.

From 2014 to 2015, Unser was heading the "Team Speedway Racing Team" of Speedway Motors of Lincoln, Nebraska in a seventeen-event Goodguys AutoCross series.

Unser is the son of Bobby Unser, nephew of Al Unser Sr., and cousin of both Al Unser Jr. and Johnny Unser.

== Racing record ==
=== American open–wheel racing results ===
(key)

==== CART ====
Year	Team	Chassis	Engine	1	2	3	4	5	6	7	8	9	10	11	12	13	14	15	Rank	Points
1989	Hemelgarn Racing	Lola T89/00	Judd AV V8t	PHX	LBH	INDY	MIL	DET	POR	CLE	MEA	TOR	MIS	POC	MDO	ROA	NZR	LS; DNQ	NC	–

==== Indy Lights ====
Year	Team	1	2	3	4	5	6	7	8	9	10	11	12	13	Rank	Points
1996	PacWest Lights	MIA; 13	LBH; 15	NAZ; 14	MIS; 4	MIL; 10	DET; 10	POR; 15	CLE	TOR; 10	TRO; 9	VAN; 14	LS; 20		15th	25
1997	PacWest Lights	MIA; 8	LBH; 7	NAZ; 10	SAV; 22	STL; 7	MIL; 6	DET; 12	POR; 14	TOR; 7	TRO; 19	VAN; 21	LS; 22	FON; 16	15th	35

==== Indy Racing League ====
Year	Team	Chassis	No.	Engine	1	2	3	4	5	6	7	8	9	10	11	Rank	Points	Ref
1998	Team Cheever	G-Force GF01B	52	Oldsmobile Aurora V8	WDW	PHX	INDY; 5	TXS; 9		DOV; 11	CLT	PPIR; 12	ATL; 16	TX2; 2	LVS; 16	16th	176	
1998	Team Cheever	Dallara IR8	52	Oldsmobile Aurora V8					NHM; 11							16th	176	
1999	Team Pelfrey	Dallara IR9	81	Oldsmobile Aurora V8	WDW; 15	PHX; 26	CLT; C	INDY; 8	TXS; 6	PPIR; 6	ATL; 2	DOV; 12	PPI2; 9	LVS; 16	TX2; 14	10th	209	
2000	Tri-Star Motorsports	Dallara IR-00	9	Oldsmobile Aurora V8	WDW; 24	PHX	LVS									34th	19	
2000	Byrd-McCormack Motorsports	Riley & Scott Mk V	30	Oldsmobile Aurora V8				INDY; DNQ	TXS; 26	PPIR; 21	ATL	KTY	TX2			34th	19	

==== Indianapolis 500 ====
Year	Chassis	Engine	Start	Finish
1998	G-Force GF01B	Oldsmobile Aurora V8	21	5
1999	Dallara IR9	Oldsmobile Aurora V8	17	8
2000	Riley & Scott Mk V	Oldsmobile Aurora V8	DNQ	

Sporting positions
Preceded by Jim Guthrie	IndyCar Series; Rookie of the Year; 1998	Succeeded by Scott Harrington
