= 1998 Radisson 200 =

(United States) 1998 Pikes Peak
Race details
- 8th round of the 1998 Indy Racing League season
- Date: August 16, 1998
- Official name: Samsonite 200
- Location: Pikes Peak International Raceway
- Course: Permanent racing facility 1.000 mi / 1.609 km
- Distance: 200 laps 200.000 mi / 321.869 km

Pole position
- Driver: (United States) Billy Boat (A. J. Foyt Enterprises)
- Time: 20.160

Fastest lap
- Driver: (United States) Jeff Ward (ISM Racing)
- Time: 21.174 (on lap unknown out of 200)

Podium
- First: (Sweden) Kenny Bräck (A. J. Foyt Enterprises)
- Second: (United States) Robbie Buhl (Team Menard)
- Third: (United States) Tony Stewart (Team Menard)

The 1998 Radisson 200 (also referred to as the Colorado 200 on ABC's TV coverage) was the eighth round of the 1998 Indy Racing League. The race was held on August 16, 1998, at the 1.000 mi (1.609 km) Pikes Peak International Raceway in Fountain, Colorado.

== Report ==
Key	Meaning
R	Rookie
W	Past winner

=== Qualifying ===
Two laps qualifying. The worst lap from any of the drivers are unknown.

Pos	No.	Name	Lap	Best (in mph)
1	11	(United States) Billy Boat	20.160	178.571
2	35	(United States) Jeff Ward	20.200	178.218
3	1	(United States) Tony Stewart W	20.239	177.874
4	28	(United States) Mark Dismore	20.340	176.991
5	14	(Sweden) Kenny Bräck	20.342	176.974
6	3	(United States) Robbie Buhl	20.406	176.419
7	6	(United States) Davey Hamilton	20.443	176.099
8	8	(United States) Scott Sharp	20.463	175.927
9	16	(Brazil) Marco Greco	20.471	175.859
10	23	(Colombia) Roberto Guerrero	20.567	175.038
11	4	(Canada) Scott Goodyear	20.579	174.936
12	30	(Brazil) Raul Boesel	20.590	174.842
13	10	(United States) John Paul Jr.	20.636	174.452
14	18	(United States) Steve Knapp R	20.730	173.661
15	12	(United States) Buzz Calkins	20.744	173.544
16	51	(United States) Eddie Cheever	20.761	173.402
17	91	(United States) Buddy Lazier	20.770	173.327
18	77	(France) Stéphan Grégoire	20.833	172.803
19	99	(United States) Sam Schmidt	20.890	172.327
20	15	(United States) Andy Michner R	20.925	172.043
21	98	(United States) Donnie Beechler R	20.926	172.035
22	5	(Netherlands) Arie Luyendyk	20.989	171.518
23	52	(United States) Robby Unser R	21.425	168.028
24	81	(United States) Brian Tyler R	21.490	167.520
25	40	(United States) Jack Miller^{1}	Didn't qualify	No speed

1. Couldn't qualify after his chassis had been damaged in a practice crash. He was allowed to start the race at the back of the field.

==== Failed to qualify or withdrew ====
- (United States) Stan Wattles for Metro Racing Systems - took part in practice sessions, but withdrew before qualifying.

=== Race ===
Pos	No.	Driver	Team	Laps	Time/Retired	Grid	Laps Led	Points
1	5	(Sweden) Kenny Bräck	A. J. Foyt Enterprises	200	1:29:52.649	5	28	50
2	3	(United States) Robbie Buhl	Team Menard	200	+ 7.542 sec	6	8	25^{1}
3	1	(United States) Tony Stewart W	Team Menard	200	Running	3	21	21^{1}
4	77	(France) Stéphan Grégoire	Chastain Motorsports	199	+ 1 lap	18	0	32
5	6	(United States) Davey Hamilton	Nienhouse Motorsports	199	+ 1 lap	7	38	30
6	16	(Brazil) Marco Greco	Phoenix Racing	199	+ 1 lap	9	0	28
7	91	(United States) Buddy Lazier	Hemelgarn Racing	199	+ 1 lap	17	8	26
8	51	(United States) Eddie Cheever	Team Cheever	199	+ 1 lap	16	0	24
9	11	(United States) Billy Boat	A. J. Foyt Enterprises	198	+ 2 laps	1	0	25
10	98	(United States) Donnie Beechler R	Cahill Auto Racing	197	+ 3 laps	21	0	20
11	8	(United States) Scott Sharp	Kelley Racing	196	+ 4 laps	8	0	19
12	52	(United States) Robby Unser R	Team Cheever	196	+ 4 laps	23	0	18
13	99	(United States) Sam Schmidt	LP Racing	195	+ 5 laps	19	0	17
14	18	(United States) Steve Knapp R	PDM Racing	195	+ 5 laps	14	0	16
15	10	(United States) John Paul Jr.	Byrd-Cunningham Racing	195	+ 5 laps	13	0	15
16	81	(United States) Brian Tyler R	Team Pelfrey	186	+ 14 laps	24	0	14
17	15	(United States) Andy Michner R	Riley & Scott Cars	180	+ 20 laps	20	0	13
18	4	(Canada) Scott Goodyear	Panther Racing	174	+ 26 laps	11	0	12
19	28	(United States) Mark Dismore	Kelley Racing	133	+ 67 laps	4	0	11
20	35	(United States) Jeff Ward	ISM Racing	117	Accident	2	97	14
21	23	(Colombia) Roberto Guerrero	CBR Cobb Racing	106	Ignition	10	0	9
22	5	(Netherlands) Arie Luyendyk	Treadway Racing	73	Engine	22	0	8
23	40	(United States) Jack Miller	Crest Racing/SRS	35	Clutch	25	0	7
24	12	(United States) Buzz Calkins	Bradley Motorsports	23	Engine	15	0	6
25	30	(Brazil) Raul Boesel	McCormack Motorsports	23	Engine	12	0	5

1. On August 21, both Menard drivers were docked 15 points after the rear wing of their cars was declared illegal in a technical inspection. The penalties were appealed on September 9 and, despite a hearing having been scheduled for September 23, the appeal was dismissed in just two days.

== Race Statistics ==
- Lead changes: 10 among 6 drivers

Lap Leaders
Laps	Leader
1-11	Jeff Ward
12-22	Tony Stewart
23-50	Jeff Ward
51-59	Tony Stewart
60-117	Jeff Ward
118-125	Buddy Lazier
126	Tony Stewart
127-164	Davey Hamilton
165-188	Kenny Bräck
189-196	Robbie Buhl
197-200	Kenny Bräck

Cautions: 3 for 28 laps
Laps	Reason
24-34	Buzz Calkins' engine leaks oil on track
75-79	Arie Luyendyk's engine leaks oil on track
118-129	Jeff Ward crash

== Standings after the race ==
Drivers' Championship standings before the penalties

Pos	Driver	Points
1	(United States) Tony Stewart	242
2	(United States) Scott Sharp	233
3	(Sweden) Kenny Bräck	232
4	(United States) Davey Hamilton	219
5	(Canada) Scott Goodyear	194

Drivers' Championship standings after the penalties

Pos	Driver	Points
1	(United States) Scott Sharp	233
2	(Sweden) Kenny Bräck	232
3	(United States) Tony Stewart	227
4	(United States) Davey Hamilton	219
5	(Canada) Scott Goodyear	194

- Note: Only the top five positions are included for the standings.
