= 1998 Indy 200 at Walt Disney World =

(United States) 1998 Walt Disney World
Race details
- 1st round of the 1998 Indy Racing League season
- Date: January 24, 1998
- Official name: Indy 200 at Walt Disney World
- Location: Walt Disney World Speedway
- Course: Permanent racing facility 1.000 mi / 1.609 km
- Distance: 200 laps 200.000 mi / 321.869 km

Pole position
- Driver: (United States) Tony Stewart (Team Menard)
- Time: Grid set by entrant points

Fastest lap
- Driver: (Sweden) Kenny Bräck (A. J. Foyt Enterprises)
- Time: 21.831 (on lap 57 of 200)

Podium
- First: (United States) Tony Stewart (Team Menard)
- Second: (United States) Jeff Ward (ISM Racing)
- Third: (United States) Davey Hamilton (Nienhouse Motorsports)

The 1998 Indy 200 at Walt Disney World was the first round of the 1998 Indy Racing League season. The race was held on January 24, 1998 at the 1.000 mi (1.609 km) Walt Disney World Speedway in Bay Lake, Florida. As in 1997, rain hampered the event, this time forcing to cancel the qualifying session.

== Report ==
Key	Meaning
R	Rookie
W	Past winner

=== Qualifying ===
For the first time in IRL history, torrential rain forced the qualifying session to be cancelled. Thus, the grid was set by 1996-1997 entrant points. The remaining new entries were sorted by practice speeds. The grid was limited to 28 cars due to concerns about safety in the pit area.

Pos	No.	Name	1996-1997 entrant points	Practice speed (in mph)
1	1	(United States) Tony Stewart	2780	168.951
2	14	(Sweden) Kenny Bräck	2720	166.659
3	11	(United States) Billy Boat	2400	163.726
4	10	(United States) Mike Groff	2390	160.299
5	5	(Netherlands) Arie Luyendyk	2230	161.638
6	21	(Colombia) Roberto Guerrero	2210	166.929
7	18	(United States) John Paul Jr.	2160	158.249
8	91	(United States) Buddy Lazier	2090	166.775
9	30	(Brazil) Raul Boesel	2080	162.126
10	12	(United States) Buzz Calkins W	1836	163.154
11	40	(United States) Jack Miller	1680	154.759
12	27	(United States) Robbie Groff	1674	157.398
13	17	(United States) Brian Tyler R	1248	157.446
14	3	(United States) Robbie Buhl	1141	165.723
15	77	(France) Stéphan Grégoire	1092	156.849
16	97	(United States) Greg Ray	365	160.464
17	99	(United States) Sam Schmidt	114	155.743
18	19	(United States) Stan Wattles	27	155.166
19	6	(United States) Davey Hamilton	19	164.166
20	8	(United States) Scott Sharp	New entry	167.645
21	4	(Canada) Scott Goodyear	New entry	166.574
22	28	(United States) Mark Dismore	New entry	165.358
23	51	(United States) Eddie Cheever W	New entry	165.069
24	35	(United States) Jeff Ward	New entry	163.674
25	16	(Brazil) Marco Greco	New entry	161.783
26	15	(Chile) Eliseo Salazar	New entry	161.233
27	20	(United States) Tyce Carlson	New entry	157.604
28	7	(United States) Jimmy Kite^{1}	2360	165.153
Didn't qualify
29	24	(United States) Billy Roe	New entry	156.013
30	53	(United States) Jim Guthrie	New entry	148.215
31	41	(Brazil) Affonso Giaffone	New entry	131.401

1. Changed to a backup car for the race, following a crash in a practice session after qualifying.

==== Failed to qualify or withdrew ====
- (United States) John Hollansworth Jr. R for Blueprint Racing - couldn't pass his rookie test in time for the race and did not take part in official practice. Replaced by (United States) Robbie Groff.

=== Race ===
Tony Stewart outlasted all challengers to take his second IRL victory. Starting on the pole, he was quickly passed by Roberto Guerrero who pulled away until he got collected in an accident in turn 1. Stewart then led the rest of the first half of the race, which was marked by numerous incidents taking out contenders: Scott Sharp got tangled up with a slower car and had to pit for a new nose, Scott Goodyear slid into the wall in the midstretch and suffered suspension damage, Raul Boesel collided in the pit lane with Robbie Buhl and needed a radiator replaced, and defending champion Eddie Cheever dropped out with engine failure.

Unexpected cold weather caused tire problems for the competitors; Robbie Groff wrecked at the start of the race when his rear tires broke loose under acceleration, and Billy Boat had a grinding crash on the inside wall of the front stretch when the same thing happened to him on a restart. On lap 132, Buddy Lazier took the lead and held it until he got bound up behind a slower car, spun, and hit the back stretch inside wall on lap 166. At that point, all five cars remaining in the lead lap (Stewart, Davey Hamilton, Jeff Ward, Stéphan Grégoire and Mark Dismore) were marginal on fuel mileage. Stewart, Hamilton, and Ward pitted for fuel, while Dismore and Grégoire elected to gamble and assumed the top two places.

After the restart, Dismore held off Stewart (who had moved back up to second) while Grégoire, Hamilton, and Ward all dueled for third. The gamble didn't work for Dismore, and he finally had to pit for fuel on lap 197 after Stewart had passed him two laps earlier when the engine stumbled. On the final lap, Ward passed Hamilton, and then claimed second place as Grégoire ran out of fuel and coasted across the line to a fourth-place finish.

Pos	No.	Driver	Team	Laps	Time/Retired	Grid	Laps Led	Points
1	1	(United States) Tony Stewart	Team Menard	200	2:06:07	1	132	52
2	35	(United States) Jeff Ward	ISM Racing	200	+ 8.579 sec	24	0	40
3	6	(United States) Davey Hamilton	Nienhouse Motorsports	200	Running	19	0	35
4	77	(France) Stéphan Grégoire	Chastain Motorsports	200	Running	15	0	32
5	28	(United States) Mark Dismore	Kelley Racing	199	+ 1 lap	22	27	30
6	8	(United States) Scott Sharp	Kelley Racing	198	+ 2 lap	20	0	28
7	10	(United States) Mike Groff	Byrd-Cunningham Racing	198	+ 2 lap	4	0	26
8	5	(Netherlands) Arie Luyendyk	Treadway Racing	197	+ 3 laps	5	0	24
9	99	(United States) Sam Schmidt	LP Racing	195	+ 5 laps	17	0	22
10	18	(United States) John Paul Jr.	PDM Racing	194	+ 6 laps	7	0	20
11	20	(United States) Tyce Carlson	Immke Racing	192	+ 8 laps	27	0	19
12	15	(Chile) Eliseo Salazar	Riley & Scott Cars	187	+ 13 laps	26	0	18
13	14	(Sweden) Kenny Bräck	A. J. Foyt Enterprises	174	+ 26 laps	2	1	17
14	12	(United States) Buzz Calkins W	Bradley Motorsports	168	+ 32 laps	10	0	16
15	91	(United States) Buddy Lazier	Hemelgarn Racing	165	Accident	8	34	15
16	7	(United States) Jimmy Kite	Team Scandia	149	Half shaft	28	0	14
17	4	(Canada) Scott Goodyear	Panther Racing	132	Suspension	21	0	13
18	30	(Brazil) Raul Boesel	McCormack Motorsports	128	+ 72 laps	9	0	12
19	17	(United States) Brian Tyler R	Chitwood Motorsports	121	Accident	13	0	11
20	3	(United States) Robbie Buhl	Team Menard	100	Electrical	14	0	10
21	11	(United States) Billy Boat	A. J. Foyt Enterprises	72	Accident	3	0	9
22	19	(United States) Stan Wattles	Metro Racing Systems	64	Accident	18	0	8
23	40	(United States) Jack Miller	Crest Racing/SRS	59	Handling	11	0	7
24	51	(United States) Eddie Cheever W	Team Cheever	48	Engine fire	23	0	6
25	97	(United States) Greg Ray	Knapp Motorsports	29	Accident	16	0	5
26	21	(Colombia) Roberto Guerrero	Pagan Racing	13	Accident	6	6	4
27	16	(Brazil) Marco Greco	Phoenix Racing	12	Accident	25	0	3
28	27	(United States) Robbie Groff	Blueprint Racing	0	Accident	12	0	2

== Race Statistics ==
- Lead changes: 8 among 5 drivers

Lap Leaders
Laps	Leader
1-7	Tony Stewart
8-13	Roberto Guerrero
14-126	Tony Stewart
127	Kenny Bräck
128-131	Tony Stewart
132-165	Buddy Lazier
166-168	Tony Stewart
169-195	Mark Dismore
196-200	Tony Stewart

Cautions: 10 for 74 laps
Laps	Reason
1-6	Robbie Groff crash
14-26	Eliseo Salazar spin; Roberto Guerrero and Marco Greco crash
34-41	Greg Ray crash and Jack Miller spin
49-53	Fire on Eddie Cheever's engine
66-71	Stan Wattles crash
72-81	Billy Boat crash
102-107	Debris from Robbie Buhl's car
124-131	Bryan Tyler and Eliseo Salazar crash
134-139	Scott Goodyear crash
166-171	Buddy Lazier crash

== Standings after the race ==
Drivers' Championship standings

Pos	Driver	Points
1	(United States) Tony Stewart	52
2	(United States) Jeff Ward	40
3	(United States) Davey Hamilton	35
4	(France) Stéphan Grégoire	32
5	(United States) Mark Dismore	30

- Note: Only the top five positions are included for the standings.
