= 1998 Pep Boys 400K =

Indy Racing League car race

(United States) 1998 Dover
Race details
- 6th round of the 1998 Indy Racing League season
- Date: July 19, 1998
- Official name: Pep Boys 400K
- Location: Dover Downs International Speedway
- Course: Permanent racing facility 1.000 mi / 1.609 km
- Distance: 248 laps 248.000 mi / 399.032 km

Pole position
- Driver: (United States) Tony Stewart (Team Menard)
- Time: 19.438

Fastest lap
- Driver: (United States) Greg Ray (A. J. Foyt Enterprises)
- Time: 19.622 (on lap unknown out of 248)

Podium
- First: (United States) Scott Sharp (Kelley Racing)
- Second: (United States) Buddy Lazier (Hemelgarn Racing)
- Third: (Brazil) Marco Greco (Phoenix Racing)

The 1998 Pep Boys 400K was the sixth round of the 1998 Indy Racing League. The race was held on July 19, 1998 at the 1.000 mi (1.609 km) Dover Downs International Speedway in Dover, Delaware. It was the second Indy car race held at this track, and the first since the 1969 Delaware 200.

== Report ==
Key	Meaning
R	Rookie
W	Past winner

=== Qualifying ===
Two laps qualifying. The worst lap from any of the drivers are unknown.

Pos	No.	Name	Lap	Best (in mph)
1	1	(United States) Tony Stewart	19.438	185.204
2	6	(United States) Davey Hamilton	19.728	182.482
3	28	(United States) Mark Dismore	19.744	182.334
4	8	(United States) Scott Sharp	19.794	181.873
5	18	(United States) Steve Knapp R	19.832	181.525
6	4	(Canada) Scott Goodyear	19.885	181.041
7	11	(United States) Greg Ray	19.888	181.014
8	35	(United States) Jeff Ward	19.896	180.941
9	30	(Brazil) Raul Boesel	19.898	180.923
10	5	(Netherlands) Arie Luyendyk	19.910	180.814
11	77	(France) Stéphan Grégoire	19.977	180.207
12	14	(Sweden) Kenny Bräck	20.029	179.739
13	10	(United States) John Paul Jr.	20.039	179.650
14	91	(United States) Buddy Lazier	20.051	179.538
15	40	(United States) Jack Miller	20.184	178.359
16	52	(United States) Robby Unser R	20.210	178.130
17	51	(United States) Eddie Cheever	20.227	177.980
18	99	(United States) Sam Schmidt	20.269	177.611
19	81	(United States) Brian Tyler R	20.428	176.229
20	23	(United States) Jim Guthrie	20.584	174.893
21	16	(Brazil) Marco Greco^{1}	Didn't qualify	No speed
22	15	(United States) Scott Harrington^{2} R	Didn't qualify	No speed

1. Had an engine failure in his warm-up lap. He was allowed to start the race at the back of the field.
2. Named for the ride after qualifying. He was allowed to start the race at the back of the field.

==== Failed to qualify or withdrew ====
- (Chile) Eliseo Salazar for Riley & Scott Cars - crashed in practice on Friday July 17 and was hospitalized with a broken right arm, hip, leg and pelvis. Replaced by (United States) Scott Harrington.
- (United States) Buzz Calkins for Bradley Motorsports - after losing an engine on practice, his team decided to sit out for the weekend and also to withdraw for the next event at Charlotte to regain competitiveness.
- (United States) Robbie Buhl for Team Menard - withdrawn prior to the start of practice by his team as a protest after John Menard accused A. J. Foyt of "skullduggery" during qualifying at New Hampshire. He was also withdrawn for the Charlotte race.
- (United States) J. J. Yeley R for Sinden Racing Services - withdrawn prior to the start of practice by his team in support of Menard's protest.
- (United States) Stan Wattles for Metro Racing Systems - the team withdrew prior to the start of practice to concentrate on its testing programme.

=== Race ===
Pos	No.	Driver	Team	Laps	Time/Retired	Grid	Laps Led	Points
1	8	(United States) Scott Sharp	Kelley Racing	248	2:29:49.262	4	145	52
2	91	(United States) Buddy Lazier	Hemelgarn Racing	248	+ 0.689 sec	14	7	40
3	16	(Brazil) Marco Greco	Phoenix Racing	246	+ 2 laps	21	0	35
4	6	(United States) Davey Hamilton	Nienhouse Motorsports	246	+ 2 laps	2	4	34
5	77	(France) Stéphan Grégoire	Chastain Motorsports	244	+ 4 laps	11	0	30
6	4	(Canada) Scott Goodyear	Panther Racing	242	+ 6 laps	6	0	28
7	23	(United States) Jim Guthrie	CBR Cobb Racing	229	+ 19 laps	20	0	26
8	1	(United States) Tony Stewart	Team Menard	220	+ 28 laps	1	85	27
9	5	(Netherlands) Arie Luyendyk	Treadway Racing	203	Accident	10	0	22
10	14	(Sweden) Kenny Bräck	A. J. Foyt Enterprises	197	+ 51 laps	12	0	20
11	52	(United States) Robby Unser R	Team Cheever	183	Accident	16	0	19
12	81	(United States) Brian Tyler R	Team Pelfrey	162	+ 86 laps	19	0	18
13	18	(United States) Steve Knapp R	PDM Racing	146	Accident	5	0	17
14	30	(Brazil) Raul Boesel	McCormack Motorsports	123	Engine	9	7	16
15	11	(United States) Greg Ray	A. J. Foyt Enterprises	104	Accident	7	0	15
16	51	(United States) Eddie Cheever	Team Cheever	104	Accident	17	0	14
17	99	(United States) Sam Schmidt	LP Racing	85	Accident	18	0	13
18	28	(United States) Mark Dismore	Kelley Racing	43	Engine	3	0	13
19	35	(United States) Jeff Ward	ISM Racing	21	Accident	8	0	11
20	40	(United States) Jack Miller	Crest Racing/SRS	20	Accident	15	0	10
21	10	(United States) John Paul Jr.	Byrd-Cunningham Racing	6	Engine	13	0	9
22	15	(United States) Scott Harrington R	Riley & Scott Cars	1	Handling	22	0	8

== Race Statistics ==
- Lead changes: 8 among 5 drivers

Lap Leaders
Laps	Leader
1-4	Davey Hamilton
5-33	Tony Stewart
34-40	Raul Boesel
41-85	Tony Stewart
86-150	Scott Sharp
151-161	Tony Stewart
162-195	Scott Sharp
196-202	Buddy Lazier
203-248	Scott Sharp

Cautions: 8 for 95 laps
Laps	Reason
22-36	Ward, Miller and Goodyear crash
42-49	Mark Dismore's engine leaks oil on track
79-85	Tow-in for Sam Schmidt (out of fuel)
95-103	Sam Schmidt crash
106-117	Eddie Cheever and Greg Ray crash
150-163	Steve Knapp crash
184-200	Robby Unser crash
204-216	Arie Luyendyk crash

== Standings after the race ==
Drivers' Championship standings

Pos	Driver	Points
1	(United States) Scott Sharp	202
2	(United States) Tony Stewart	194
3	(United States) Davey Hamilton	163
4	(Canada) Scott Goodyear	147
5	(United States) Buddy Lazier	143

- Note: Only the top five positions are included for the standings.
