= 1998 VisionAire 500K =

(United States) 1998 Charlotte
Race details
- 7th round of the 1998 Indy Racing League season
- Date: July 25, 1998
- Official name: VisionAire 500K
- Location: Charlotte Motor Speedway
- Course: Permanent racing facility 1.500 mi / 2.414 km
- Distance: 208 laps 312.000 mi / 502.115 km

Pole position
- Driver: (United States) Tony Stewart (Team Menard)
- Time: 24.490

Fastest lap
- Driver: (Sweden) Kenny Bräck (A. J. Foyt Enterprises)
- Time: 24.735 (on lap unknown out of 208)

Podium
- First: (Sweden) Kenny Bräck (A. J. Foyt Enterprises)
- Second: (United States) Jeff Ward (ISM Racing)
- Third: (Canada) Scott Goodyear (Panther Racing)

The 1998 VisionAire 500K was the seventh round of the 1998 Indy Racing League. The race was held on July 25, 1998 at the 1.500 mi (2.414 km) Charlotte Motor Speedway in Concord, North Carolina.

== Report ==
Key	Meaning
R	Rookie
W	Past winner

=== Qualifying ===
Two laps qualifying. The worst lap from any of the drivers are unknown.

Pos	No.	Name	Lap	Best (in mph)
1	1	(United States) Tony Stewart	24.490	220.498
2	11	(United States) Greg Ray	24.546	219.995
3	14	(Sweden) Kenny Bräck	24.599	219.521
4	28	(United States) Mark Dismore	24.725	218.402
5	16	(Brazil) Marco Greco	24.737	218.296
6	8	(United States) Scott Sharp	24.779	217.926
7	4	(Canada) Scott Goodyear	24.985	216.130
8	6	(United States) Davey Hamilton	25.039	215.664
9	30	(Brazil) Raul Boesel	25.063	215.457
10	35	(United States) Jeff Ward	25.065	215.440
11	81	(United States) Brian Tyler R	25.165	214.584
12	51	(United States) Eddie Cheever	25.179	214.464
13	10	(United States) John Paul Jr.	25.195	214.328
14	91	(United States) Buddy Lazier W	25.196	214.320
15	5	(Netherlands) Arie Luyendyk	25.307	213.380
16	15	(United States) Andy Michner R	25.438	212.281
17	40	(United States) Jack Miller	25.549	211.359
18	77	(France) Stéphan Grégoire	25.578	211.119
19	18	(United States) Tyce Carlson	25.581	211.094
20	21	(United States) Stevie Reeves R	25.715	209.994
21	23	(United States) Jim Guthrie	25.744	209.758
22	99	(United States) Sam Schmidt	28.150	191.829
23	44	(United States) Jimmy Kite^{1}	Didn't qualify	No speed
24	98	(United States) Donnie Beechler^{2} R	Didn't qualify	No speed

1. Elected not to qualify after having signed for the ride between practice sessions, and having completed only four laps in practice because of a change in the pedal assembly to fit his size. He was allowed to start the race at the back of the field.
2. Had an engine failure during practice, and a spare was not ready on time. He was allowed to start the race at the back of the field.

==== Failed to qualify or withdrew ====
- (United States) Robby Unser R for Team Cheever - entered for the race, but was sidelined with a concussion suffered at Dover the previous week.

=== Race ===
Pos	No.	Driver	Team	Laps	Time/Retired	Grid	Laps Led	Points
1	14	(Sweden) Kenny Bräck	A. J. Foyt Enterprises	208	1:58:10.555	3	76	53
2	35	(United States) Jeff Ward	ISM Racing	208	+ 5.602 sec	10	56	40
3	4	(Canada) Scott Goodyear	Panther Racing	208	+ 26.739 sec	7	5	35
4	5	(Netherlands) Arie Luyendyk	Treadway Racing	206	+ 2 laps	15	0	32
5	16	(Brazil) Marco Greco	Phoenix Racing	205	+ 3 laps	5	0	30
6	10	(United States) John Paul Jr.	Byrd-Cunningham Racing	203	+ 5 laps	13	0	28
7	6	(United States) Davey Hamilton	Nienhouse Motorsports	202	+ 6 laps	8	0	26
8	77	(France) Stéphan Grégoire	Chastain Motorsports	201	+ 7 laps	18	0	24
9	40	(United States) Jack Miller	Crest Racing/SRS	194	+ 14 laps	17	0	22
10	21	(United States) Stevie Reeves R	Pagan Racing	184	CV Joint	20	0	20
11	18	(United States) Tyce Carlson	PDM Racing	184	+ 24 laps	19	0	19
12	15	(United States) Andy Michner R	Riley & Scott Cars	174	+ 34 laps	16	2	18
13	91	(United States) Buddy Lazier W	Hemelgarn Racing	171	+ 37 laps	14	0	17
14	99	(United States) Sam Schmidt	LP Racing	147	Electrical	22	0	16
15	28	(United States) Mark Dismore	Kelley Racing	144	Engine	4	21	15
16	81	(United States) Brian Tyler R	Team Pelfrey	144	Electrical	11	0	14
17	11	(United States) Greg Ray	A. J. Foyt Enterprises	122	Gearbox	2	4	15
18	8	(United States) Scott Sharp	Kelley Racing	104	Accident	6	25	12
19	98	(United States) Donnie Beechler R	Cahill Auto Racing	102	Accident	24	0	11
20	51	(United States) Eddie Cheever	Team Cheever	71	Engine	12	0	10
21	1	(United States) Tony Stewart	Team Menard	54	Engine	1	19	12
22	23	(United States) Jim Guthrie	CBR Cobb Racing	49	Fuel Pressure	21	0	8
23	44	(United States) Jimmy Kite	Sinden Racing Services	29	Handling	23	0	7
24	30	(Brazil) Raul Boesel	McCormack Motorsports	5	Engine	9	0	6

== Race Statistics ==
- Lead changes: 19 among 8 drivers

Lap Leaders
Laps	Leader
1-4	Greg Ray
5-23	Tony Stewart
24-30	Mark Dismore
31	Kenny Bräck
32	Mark Dismore
33-34	Andy Michner
35-39	Scott Sharp
40-76	Kenny Bräck
77-96	Scott Sharp
97-107	Mark Dismore
108	Kenny Bräck
109-110	Mark Dismore
111-145	Jeff Ward
146	Kenny Bräck
147-150	Scott Goodyear
151-172	Kenny Bräck
173	Scott Goodyear
174	Kenny Bräck
175-195	Jeff Ward
196-208	Kenny Bräck

Cautions: 7 for 43 laps
Laps	Reason
10-13	Raul Boesel stopped on track
30-34	Tony Stewart's engine leaks oil on track
72-80	Eddie Cheever's engine leaks oil on track
105-113	Scott Sharp and Donnie Beechler crash
130-134	Tow-in for Tyce Carlson
144-149	Mark Dismore's engine leaks oil on track
171-175	Tow-in for Tyce Carlson

== Standings after the race ==
Drivers' Championship standings

Pos	Driver	Points
1	(United States) Scott Sharp	214
2	(United States) Tony Stewart	206
3	(United States) Davey Hamilton	189
4	(Sweden) Kenny Bräck	182
5	(Canada) Scott Goodyear	182

- Note: Only the top five positions are included for the standings.
