= 1998 New England 200 =

(United States) 1998 New Hampshire
Race details
- 5th round of the 1998 Indy Racing League season
- Date: June 28, 1998
- Official name: New England 200
- Location: New Hampshire International Speedway
- Course: Permanent racing facility 1.058 mi / 1.703 km
- Distance: 200 laps 211.600 mi / 340.600 km

Pole position
- Driver: (United States) Billy Boat (A. J. Foyt Enterprises)
- Time: 23.490

Fastest lap
- Driver: (United States) Davey Hamilton (Nienhouse Motorsports)
- Time: 24.068 (on lap unknown out of 200)

Podium
- First: (United States) Tony Stewart (Team Menard)
- Second: (Canada) Scott Goodyear (Panther Racing)
- Third: (United States) Scott Sharp (Kelley Racing)

The 1998 New England 200 was the fifth round of the 1998 Indy Racing League. The race was held on June 28, 1998, at the 1.058 mi (1.703 km) New Hampshire International Speedway in Loudon, New Hampshire. It would be the last Indy car race held at this track until the 2011 MoveThatBlock.com Indy 225.

== Report ==
Key	Meaning
R	Rookie
W	Past winner

=== Qualifying ===
Two laps qualifying. The worst lap from any of the drivers were not published, and therefore are unknown.

Pos	No.	Name	Lap	Best (in mph)
1	11	(United States) Billy Boat	23.490	162.146
2	35	(United States) Jeff Ward	23.644	161.089
3	91	(United States) Buddy Lazier	23.874	159.538
4	8	(United States) Scott Sharp W	23.926	159.191
5	4	(Canada) Scott Goodyear	23.953	159.011
6	1	(United States) Tony Stewart	23.970	158.899
7	5	(Netherlands) Arie Luyendyk	23.997	158.720
8	14	(Sweden) Kenny Bräck	24.116	157.937
9	30	(Brazil) Raul Boesel	24.140	157.780
10	10	(United States) John Paul Jr.	24.165	157.616
11	51	(United States) Eddie Cheever	24.185	157.486
12	3	(United States) Robbie Buhl W	24.255	157.032
13	28	(United States) Mark Dismore	24.332	156.535
14	16	(Brazil) Marco Greco	24.429	155.913
15	98	(United States) Donnie Beechler R	24.715	154.109
16	77	(France) Stéphan Grégoire	24.862	153.198
17	15	(Chile) Eliseo Salazar	24.968	152.547
18	52	(United States) Robby Unser R	25.343	150.290
19	40	(United States) Jack Miller	25.528	149.201
20	18	(United States) Jack Hewitt R	25.605	148.752
21	44	(United States) J. J. Yeley R	25.666	148.399
22	6	(United States) Davey Hamilton	25.722	148.076
23	12	(United States) Buzz Calkins	25.860	147.285
24	99	(United States) Sam Schmidt	26.410	144.218
25	81	(United States) Brian Tyler R	26.711	142.593
26	19	(United States) Stan Wattles^{1}	Didn't qualify	No speed

1. Crashed during his qualifying attempt, but was allowed to start the race at the back of the field using a provisional.

==== Failed to qualify or withdrew ====
- (Colombia) Roberto Guerrero for Pagan Racing - fired the week prior. The team decided to sit out the event (as well as the next event at Dover) in order to search and accommodate a replacement driver.
- (United States) Greg Ray for Knapp Motorsports - sat out the event because of a shortage of funds.

=== Race ===
A NASCAR Modified race preceding the IRL race left a very slippery type of marbles in the surface. After Jeff Ward had jumped polesitter Billy Boat on the start, Kenny Bräck spun in turn 3 on the first lap and collected John Paul Jr. Bräck was able to continue after repairs, but Paul was out. Immediately after that incident, Jack Hewitt lost the back end exiting turn 4 and backed into the front stretch wall. Scott Sharp jumped Ward on the restart until he chose to pit under caution (caused by J. J. Yeley's crash) on lap 27, handing the lead back to Ward.

This series of closely spaced yellows continued when Boat, who had been falling back, spun into the infield in turn 2. After the green on lap 32, Ward continued to lead until he was black flagged with fire coming out from under the car on lap 55. Scott Goodyear inherited the lead and looked very strong, pursued by Buddy Lazier and Davey Hamilton, who had set the fast lap of the race, but his chances were hurt when he was penalised for speeding in the pits during a caution on lap 77. Pit stops jumbled the running order and left Tony Stewart, Sharp, Arie Luyendyk and Eliseo Salazar pursuing Goodyear.

On lap 92, Stewart caught and passed Goodyear, just before a big crash in turn 2 on lap 95. Yeley, just returned to the track after extensive repairs, spun and contacted Donnie Beechler, who had been moving up through the field. Boat spun to avoid the wreck, but his car spun unexpectedly towards the inside, and he was hit by Raul Boesel. All four were out and Boat suffered a broken thigh, an injury that would force him to miss some races and end his championship hopes.

There were no further cautions in the second half of the race, which was dominated by Stewart. His biggest threats suffered misfortune: Sharp's engine stalled during a pit stop on lap 147, while Goodyear suffered a gearbox failure and was forced to run in fourth gear. Despite concern about the engine blowing (it could be heard hitting the rev limiter quite notably on the onboards), it held through the end of the race, and even the Canadian was able to reel in Stewart in traffic, but could not follow him in clear runs. Stewart led the final 36 laps to win over Goodyear, Sharp, Hamilton, and Luyendyk. Salazar's sixth-place finish was the best to date for the Riley & Scott chassis. Poor attendance at the event for the fifth year in a row led to the contract not being renewed for 1999.

Pos	No.	Driver	Team	Laps	Time/Retired	Grid	Laps Led	Points
1	1	(United States) Tony Stewart	Team Menard	200	1:51:30.262	6	93	52
2	4	(Canada) Scott Goodyear	Panther Racing	200	+ 1.788 sec	5	44	40
3	8	(United States) Scott Sharp W	Kelley Racing	200	Running	4	9	35
4	6	(United States) Davey Hamilton	Nienhouse Motorsports	200	Running	22	3	32
5	5	(Netherlands) Arie Luyendyk	Treadway Racing	199	+ 1 lap	7	0	30
6	15	(Chile) Eliseo Salazar	Riley & Scott Cars	199	+ 1 lap	17	0	28
7	91	(United States) Buddy Lazier	Hemelgarn Racing	199	+ 1 lap	3	0	27
8	28	(United States) Mark Dismore	Kelley Racing	199	+ 1 lap	13	0	24
9	51	(United States) Eddie Cheever	Team Cheever	198	+ 2 laps	11	0	22
10	3	(United States) Robbie Buhl W	Team Menard	198	+ 2 laps	12	5	20
11	52	(United States) Robby Unser R	Team Cheever	198	+ 2 laps	18	0	19
12	99	(United States) Sam Schmidt	LP Racing	196	+ 4 laps	24	0	18
13	16	(Brazil) Marco Greco	Phoenix Racing	191	+ 9 laps	14	0	17
14	81	(United States) Brian Tyler R	Team Pelfrey	190	+ 10 laps	25	0	16
15	12	(United States) Buzz Calkins	Bradley Motorsports	183	+ 17 laps	23	0	15
16	40	(United States) Jack Miller	Sinden Racing	168	+ 32 laps	19	0	14
17	19	(United States) Stan Wattles	Metro Racing Systems	127	Handling	26	0	13
18	14	(Sweden) Kenny Bräck	A. J. Foyt Enterprises	98	Handling	8	0	12
19	30	(Brazil) Raul Boesel	McCormack Motorsports	94	Accident	9	0	11
20	98	(United States) Donnie Beechler R	Cahill Auto Racing	93	Accident	15	0	10
21	11	(United States) Billy Boat	A. J. Foyt Enterprises	91	Accident	1	0	12
22	35	(United States) Jeff Ward	ISM Racing	56	Engine	2	46	10
23	44	(United States) J. J. Yeley R	Sinden Racing	38	Accident	21	0	7
24	77	(France) Stéphan Grégoire	Chastain Motorsports	22	Engine	16	0	6
25	18	(United States) Jack Hewitt R	PDM Racing	11	Accident	20	0	5
26	10	(United States) John Paul Jr.	Byrd-Cunningham Racing	2	Accident	10	0	4

== Race Statistics ==
- Lead changes: 9 among 6 drivers

Lap Leaders
Laps	Leader
1-18	Jeff Ward
19-27	Scott Sharp
28-55	Jeff Ward
56-77	Scott Goodyear
78-80	Davey Hamilton
81-91	Scott Goodyear
92-146	Tony Stewart
147-157	Scott Goodyear
158-162	Robbie Buhl
163-200	Tony Stewart

Cautions: 6 for 49 laps
Laps	Reason
2-10	Kenny Bräck and John Paul Jr. crash
12-18	Jack Hewitt crash
26-30	J. J. Yeley crash
32-36	Billy Boat spin
75-81	Jack Miller spin
95-110	Yeley, Boat, Beechler and Boesel crash

== Standings after the race ==
Drivers' Championship standings

Pos	Driver	Points
1	(United States) Tony Stewart	167
2	(United States) Scott Sharp	150
3	(United States) Davey Hamilton	129
4	(United States) Billy Boat	122
5	(Canada) Scott Goodyear	119

- Note: Only the top five positions are included for the standings.
