= VisionAire 500K =

Former auto race held at Charlotte

IndyCar Series
- Venue: Charlotte Motor Speedway
- Corporate sponsor: VisionAire HVAC
- First race: 1997
- First IndyCar race: 1997
- Last race: 1999
- Distance: 502.115 km (312.000 mi)
- Laps: 208
- Previous names: VisionAire 500 (1997)

The VisionAire 500K was an Indy Racing League race held at Charlotte Motor Speedway from 1997 to 1999. During the 1999 event, three spectators were killed when debris from a crash on the track went into the grandstands. The race was stopped and canceled, and the event was removed from the Indy Racing League schedule.

== Race history ==
The first open wheel races in the region were held at the Charlotte Speedway board track built in Pineville from 1924 to 1927. Tommy Milton won the first race, a 250-mile event.

=== USAC ===
In 1980, USAC announced plans for a 500 km event at Charlotte Motor Speedway, the first Indy car event at the facility. Charlotte Motor Speedway had opened in 1960, and was home to the NASCAR World 600. However, no Indy car races had been held at the track over its first twenty years.

The plans for the race, however, were scrapped when USAC entered into a joint sanctioning effort with CART, and the 1980 calendar was reorganized.

=== Indy Racing League ===
In 1996, the upstart Indy Racing League tested at the facility, with plans to add it to the schedule in 1997. The first test saw speeds in the 207 mph range, already an unofficial track record. Soon after the test, a night race was added to the IRL schedule starting in 1997.

The first two runnings were considered largely successful with Buddy Lazier and Kenny Bräck winning the mid-summer Saturday night 500 kilometer (208 lap) races. Crowds were strong, and CBS carried the race on tape delay. At the time, the IRL was attempting to expand its schedule geographically, particularly in traditional "NASCAR Country." The initial success of the event was seen as opportunity to expand the league's presence in the South, and also validated that the IRL machines were suited for the fast, high-banked "Intermediate" oval tracks.

=== 1999 fatal accident ===
In 1999, the 1999 VisionAire 500K was moved from July to the first weekend in May, the last race before the Indianapolis 500. With crowds estimated at 50,000, the track opened extra sections of grandstand seating to accommodate the additional spectators. As reported on the radio broadcast, sections of Turn 1 and Turn 4, and the first eight rows of all open grandstands were closed to spectators for safety reasons. At 8:50 p.m., during lap 62 of the race, Stan Wattles suffered a suspension failure that shot his car into the wall, shearing off both of the right wheels from the car. John Paul Jr.'s car subsequently hit the debris field and the contact sent Wattles' right rear wheel and tire assembly over the catch fence. Three spectators in the vicinity of the section which had been opened for the overflow crowd were killed by the flying tire debris. Scott Harrington spun to miss the debris field and the accident is often described as a 3-car crash, however, Harrington's car made no contact with the wall or other cars and was undamaged.

Buddy Lazier was leading the race at the time of the caution. He pitted a few laps later to change tires because of a puncture, at which point Greg Ray took over the lead. The gravity of the situation in the grandstands soon became clear, and on lap 79 after 25 minutes under yellow, race officials brought out the red flag. The race's cancellation was later declared by Humpy Wheeler, the Charlotte Motor Speedway President and General Manager.

We've made the decision due to the fact of the terrible accident up in the 4th turn and the debris that went in the grandstand, that we'll not continue the race. The race is canceled as of right now, and we ask everybody for their patience here in the grandstands in leaving the speedway, and we ask prayers for those that are injured. It's a terrible thing that we had to call the race, we've never had to do this before, but in respect to those people I think it was the thing to do…

— Humpy Wheeler, Charlotte Motor Speedway President and General Manager

Since the race had not reached half distance (which would make it official) the 1999 VisionAire 500k was officially listed as cancelled, and all statistics were scratched from official record. Spectators were offered ticket refunds, and participants were reimbursed entry fees and selected travel costs. The league does not recognize the race in its historical archives, and omitted the event in its count for the 100th race celebration in 2004. That incident, and a previous incident in July 1998 in CART's U.S. 500 which also killed three spectators, led to new rules requiring cars (both open-wheel and stock cars, as NASCAR followed suit in the NASCAR Whelen Modified Tour before expanding it to their closed-wheel national series) to have tethers attached to wheel hubs in an effort to prevent such incidents from happening again. New catch fencing was also invented, curved so debris could not sail as easily into the grandstands.

==== Sports Illustrated photo of the incident ====
Two weeks after the incident, a controversy boiled at the 1999 Indianapolis 500 after Sports Illustrated published an article by Ed Hinton, entitled "Fatal Attractions: More fan deaths put the focus on the need for safety innovations" in its May 10 issue. The article discussed the tragedy and proposed safety improvements discussed in its aftermath. The magazine's editors in New York published the article accompanied by an AP photograph taken at the scene. The photo featured a security guard standing next to two dead bodies in the grandstands covered with bloody sheets, and blood covering the steps. The photo drew the ire of the Indianapolis Motor Speedway president Tony George, and they pulled Hinton's credentials for the 1999 Indy 500. After a few days, the credentials were restored, when it was determined that Hinton was unaware of the photo published along with his article, and when free speech/censorship issues were raised.

==== Legacy of the incident ====
The incident, and a previous incident in July 1998 at the Michigan 500, a CART race at the Michigan International Speedway which also killed three spectators (that race was run to its finish), led to new rules requiring cars to have tethers attached to wheel hubs in an effort to prevent such incidents from happening again. New catch fencing was also invented, curved so debris could not sail as easily into the grandstands.

Later in the year, a short series of bombings took place in Lowe's stores in North Carolina, injuring three, and prompting some to think there may be a link with a relative of one of the victims. When George Rocha was arrested for the bombings, he claimed that he was angry about the crash at the speedway, but he later confessed that it was retribution for being caught shoplifting and an attempt at extortion.

== Past winners ==
Season	Date	Driver	Team	Chassis	Engine	Race Distance		Race Time	Average Speed (mph)	Report	Ref
Season	Date	Driver	Team	Chassis	Engine	Laps	Miles (km)	Race Time	Average Speed (mph)	Report	Ref
USAC Championship Car history
1980	September 28	Event cancelled									
Indy Racing League history
1996–97	July 26, 1997	(United States) Buddy Lazier	Hemelgarn Racing	Dallara	Oldsmobile	208	312 (502.115)	1:55:29	162.096	Report	
1998	July 25	(Sweden) Kenny Bräck	A. J. Foyt Enterprises	Dallara	Oldsmobile	208	312 (502.115)	1:58:11	158.408	Report	
1999	May 1	Race abandoned after 79 laps (3 spectators killed)								Report	
