= 2001 Casino Magic 500 =

(United States) 2001 Texas
Race details
- 5th round of the 2001 Indy Racing League season
- Date: June 9, 2001
- Official name: Casino Magic 500
- Location: Texas Motor Speedway
- Course: Permanent racing facility 1.455 mi / 2.342 km
- Distance: 200 laps 291.000 mi / 468.319 km
- Weather: Temperatures reaching up to 91.9 °F (33.3 °C); wind speeds up to 14 miles per hour (23 km/h)

Pole position
- Driver: Mark Dismore ( (United States) Kelley Racing)
- Time: 24.305

Fastest lap
- Driver: Eddie Cheever Jr. ( (United States) Team Cheever)
- Time: 23.951 (on lap 177 of 200)

Podium
- First: Scott Sharp ( (United States) Kelley Racing)
- Second: Felipe Giaffone ( (United States) Treadway Racing)
- Third: Sam Hornish Jr. ( (United States) Panther Racing)

The 2001 Casino Magic 500 was the 5th round of the 2001 Indy Racing League season. It took place on June 9, 2001 at Texas Motor Speedway.

== Qualifying ==
Mark Dismore, for the 4th time in his Indy Racing League career, qualified on pole with a speed of 215.508 mph. His teammate Scott Sharp started alongside him on the first row.

== Race ==
=== Lap 1 - Lap 78 ===
At the end of lap 1, Mark Dismore was the leader, Eddie Cheever Jr. was in second and Sam Hornish Jr. was in third. After 3 laps, Cheever Jr. took the lead from Dismore. The top 12 after 10 laps was the following: Eddie Cheever Jr., Sam Hornish Jr., Scott Sharp, Mark Dismore, Shigeaki Hattori, Robbie Buhl, Billy Boat, Donnie Beechler, Buddy Lazier, Airton Daré, Greg Ray and Jeff Ward. Caution waved for the first time on lap 25, when debris landed on the back stretch. The leaders used this as an opportunity to pit, though some elected to stay out, which promoted Jaques Lazier to the lead. The restart came at lap 32. On lap 72, a major crash, involving Sarah Fisher, Davey Hamilton and Jeret Schroeder, occurred. Schroeder suffered an engine failure, which sent him into a spin and into the path of Hamilton. Hamilton made heavy contact with the wall and almost flipped in the incident. Fisher suffered suspension damage when a tire impacted her car as she drove by the scene of the incident. Hamilton suffered severe injuries to his feet and lower legs, which caused doctors to seriously consider amputation in order for his survival. While amputation was unnecessary, Hamilton would undergo 23 surgeries and spend a year in a wheelchair in the aftermath of the accident. It would be his last race until 2007. The incident brought out the race's second caution, which allowed for another opportunity for pitstops. After the stops, the top 10 after 78 laps was: Greg Ray, Eddie Cheever Jr., Felipe Giaffone, Scott Sharp, Sam Hornish Jr., Jeff Ward, Airton Daré, Billy Boat, Didier Andre and Eliseo Salazar.

=== Lap 89 - Lap 116 ===
The restart came at lap 89. Some laps later, Airton Daré suffered an engine problem, bring out the race's third caution. Daré would spend considerable amount of time behind the wall, but would rejoin the race some 55 laps behind the leader. Racing resumed on lap 116.

=== Closing Stages: Last 44 laps ===
With 44 laps to go, caution once again came out for debris. The restart came with 40 laps to go, with Scott Sharp leading the field. With 27 laps to go, Eddie Cheever tried a three-wide pass with Greg Ray and Sharp, but ran out of room and was forced to back out, allowing Jeff Ward to take third. Bearing issues brought an end to Ward's run, though, and brought out another caution. The restart came with 12 laps to go with Scott Sharp still leading the field. With 11 laps to go, Cheever, Sharp and Ray battled for the lead, with Ray emerging the leader. However, with 5 laps to go, the leaders came up on Robby McGehee on the back stretch. Ray attempted to dive to the inside of McGehee to lap him, but made contact, causing both cars to spin and sending McGehee into the path of Cheever. All three cars retired and Sharp inherited the lead. With the track unable to be cleared for a green flag finish, Scott Sharp took victory under caution conditions.

== Final results ==
Pos	No.	Driver	Team	Engine	Chassis	Laps	Time/Retired ^{1}	Grid	Laps Led	Pts.
1	8	(United States) Scott Sharp	Kelley Racing	Oldsmobile	Dallara	200	1:55:44	2	33	50
2	21	(Brazil) Felipe Giaffone R	Treadway/Hubbard Racing	Oldsmobile	G-Force	200	+0.7133	14	1	40
3	4	(United States) Sam Hornish Jr.	Panther Racing	Oldsmobile	Dallara	200	+2.3620	4	5	35
4	91	(United States) Buddy Lazier	Hemelgarn Racing	Oldsmobile	Dallara	200	+3.6312	13		32
5	98	(United States) Billy Boat	Beck Motorsports	Oldsmobile	Dallara	200	+4.1950	10		30
6	11	(United States) Donnie Beechler	A. J. Foyt Enterprises	Oldsmobile	Dallara	200	+4.9098	6		28
7	14	(Chile) Eliseo Salazar	A. J. Foyt Enterprises	Oldsmobile	Dallara	200	+6.0578	9		26
8	3	(United States) Al Unser Jr.	Galles Racing	Oldsmobile	G-Force	200	+11.3672	11		24
9	77	(United States) Jaques Lazier	TeamXtreme Racing	Oldsmobile	G-Force	199	+1 Lap	19	4	22
10	55	(Japan) Shigeaki Hattori	Vertex-Cunningham Racing	Oldsmobile	Dallara	198	+2 Laps	5		20
11	2	(United States) Greg Ray	Team Menard	Oldsmobile	Dallara	195	Crash	20	86	21
12	51	(United States) Eddie Cheever	Team Cheever	Infiniti	Dallara	195	Crash	3	64	18
13	81	(United States) Billy Roe	Zali Racing	Oldsmobile	G-Force	195	+5 Laps	24		17
14	10	(United States) Robby McGehee	Cahill Racing	Oldsmobile	Dallara	188	Crash	17		16
15	12	(United States) Buzz Calkins	Bradley Motorsports	Oldsmobile	Dallara	188	+12 Laps	16		15
16	35	(United States) Jeff Ward	Heritage Motorsports	Oldsmobile	Dallara	184	Half Shaft	7		14
17	32	(France) Didier André R	Galles Racing	Oldsmobile	G-Force	184	+16 Laps	21		13
18	15	(United States) Sarah Fisher	Walker Racing	Oldsmobile	Dallara	176	+24 Laps	18		12
19	88	(Brazil) Airton Daré	TeamXtreme Racing	Oldsmobile	G-Force	145	+55 Laps	12	5	11
20	28	(United States) Mark Dismore	Kelley Racing	Oldsmobile	Dallara	132	Engine	1	2	10
21	24	(United States) Robbie Buhl	Dreyer & Reinbold Racing	Infiniti	G-Force	116	Electrical	8		9
22	30	(United States) Brandon Erwin R	McCormack Motorsports	Oldsmobile	G-Force	72	Handling	23		8
23	6	(United States) Jeret Schroeder	PDM Racing	Oldsmobile	Dallara	71	Crash	15		7
24	99	(United States) Davey Hamilton	Sam Schmidt Motorsports	Oldsmobile	Dallara	71	Crash	22		6

Notes: ^{1} Race finished under caution

== Point standings after 5 races ==
1. Sam Hornish Jr. 187 points
2. Eliseo Salazar -30
3. Scott Sharp -40
4. Felipe Giaffone (R) -47
5. Buddy Lazier -70
6. Billy Boat -74
7. Buzz Calkins -83
8. Greg Ray -84
9. Jeff Ward -85
10. Robby McGehee -101
- (R) denotes a contender for the Rookie of the Year award
