= 1999 Vegas.com 500 =

Motor race held in Las Vegas, Nevada

(United States) 1999 Vegas.com 500
Race details
Race 9 of 10 in the 1999 Pep Boys Indy Racing League season
← Previous race	Next race →
- Date: September 26, 1999
- Official name: Vegas.com 500
- Location: Las Vegas Motor Speedway, Las Vegas, Nevada
- Course: Permanent racing facility 1.500 mi / 2.414 km
- Distance: 208 laps 312.000 mi / 502.115 km

Pole position
- Driver: (United States) Sam Schmidt (Treadway Racing)
- Time: 25.780

Fastest lap
- Driver: (United States) Tyce Carlson (Blueprint-Immke Racing)
- Time: 26.322 (on lap 33 of 208)

Podium
- First: (United States) Sam Schmidt (Treadway Racing)
- Second: (Sweden) Kenny Bräck (A. J. Foyt Racing)
- Third: (United States) Robbie Buhl (TriStar Motorsports)

The 1999 Vegas.com 500 was a Pep Boys Indy Racing League (IRL) motor race held on September 26, 1999 in Las Vegas, Nevada at Las Vegas Motor Speedway. Contested over 208 laps, it was the ninth round of the 1999 Pep Boys Indy Racing League and the fourth running of the event. Sam Schmidt of Treadway Racing won the race; A. J. Foyt Racing driver Kenny Bräck finished second and TriStar Motorsports' Robbie Buhl came in third.

Schmidt was awarded the pole position after posting the quickest lap in qualifications. Early in the race, he was challenged for the lead by Mark Dismore and Eddie Cheever, although both drivers would later fall out of the race. Bräck first assumed the lead on the 50th lap and became the race's most dominant driver, leading 118 laps. However, with the benefit of a late-race caution, Schmidt overtook Bräck for the lead with three laps remaining and earned his first career IRL victory; it ended up being his only win before crashing in January 2000 and becoming a quadriplegic, keeping him out of IRL competition. The race featured 11 lead changes between 5 drivers and 11 cautions, the most for an IRL-sanctioned race at Las Vegas Motor Speedway.

The race result significantly trimmed Greg Ray's lead in the Drivers' Championship as Bräck moved to second and Schmidt was boosted from 12th to third with one race left in the season.

== Background ==
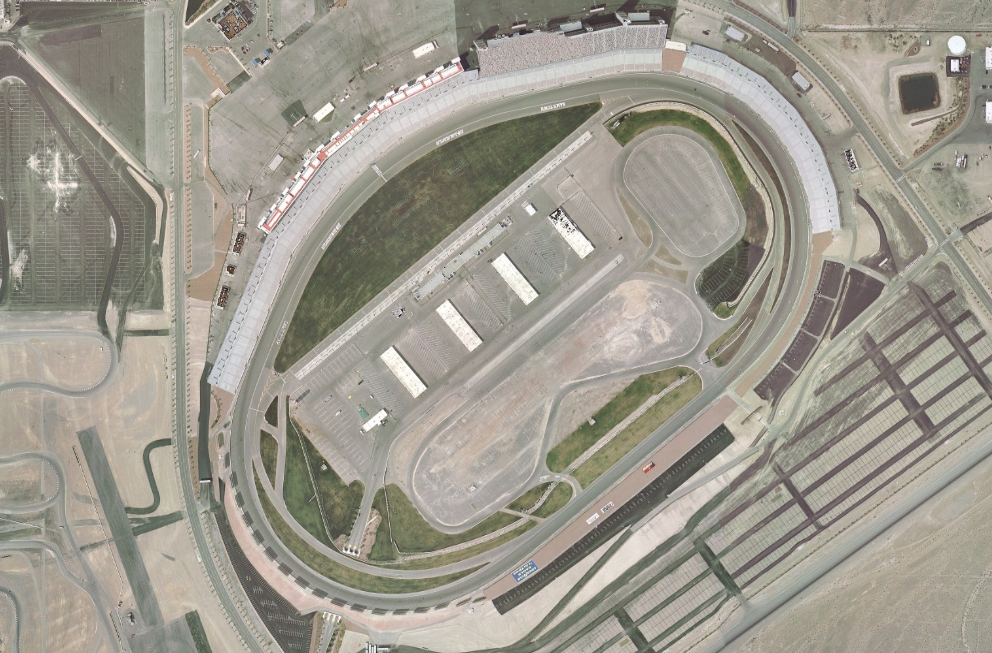
Las Vegas Motor Speedway (pictured in 2006), where the race was held.

The Vegas.com 500 was the ninth of 10 scheduled open-wheel races for the 1999 Pep Boys Indy Racing League and the fourth annual edition of the event dating back to 1996. It was held on September 26, 1999, in Las Vegas, Nevada, United States, at Las Vegas Motor Speedway, a four-turn 1.5 mi (2.4 km) paved oval track with 12-degree banking in the turns, 3-degree banking in the back stretch, and 9-degree banking in the front stretch, and contested over 208 laps and 312 miles (502 km). Heading into the race, Greg Ray held the lead in the Drivers' Championship with 246 points, followed by Scott Goodyear with 202. Kenny Bräck was third on 199 points, 14 more than Buddy Lazier in fourth and 19 more than Davey Hamilton in fifth. Ray had a chance to clinch the title if he finished the race at least 56 points ahead of second place.

There were 26 cars entered for the race, which were represented by 2 different engine manufacturers, 2 chassis manufacturers, and 2 tire suppliers. Among those entered was former European Formula 3 driver Niclas Jönsson, who passed a rookie orientation test on September 1 and was permitted to compete in his first Pep Boys Indy Racing League race with Blueprint Racing. Midget car racing driver Sarah Fisher also completed the orientation, but opted to skip the race in order to gain more track experience for the succeeding Mall.com 500. Robbie Buhl joined TriStar Motorsports in his first start since that year's Indianapolis 500. Open-wheel veteran Willy T. Ribbs, who had not competed in an American open-wheel racing event since the 1994 Toyota Grand Prix of Monterey, signed with McCormack Motorsports to become the first African-American driver to race in the series.

Several testing sessions were conducted in August at Las Vegas Motor Speedway to prepare for the Vegas.com 500. On August 10, Buzz Calkins topped the speed charts with laps at over 200 mph (320 km/h), while Ray crashed in turn four and again in turn two. Six teams participated in the testing sessions on August 11–12; Scott Sharp was the fastest driver on August 11 with a speed of 209.45 mph (337.08 km/h), and Sharp's Kelley Racing teammate Mark Dismore posted the fastest lap speed at 209.21 mph (336.69 km/h).

== Practice and qualifying ==
Four practice sessions preceded the race on Sunday, two on Friday and two on Saturday. The first three sessions lasted 90 minutes and were divided into two groups which each received equal track time, while the last session lasted 30 minutes and was open to all participants. Sam Schmidt led the first practice session on Friday morning with a lap of 25.856 seconds, besting Ray by three hundredths of a second; Stéphan Grégoire took third, Dismore was in fourth, and Goodyear came in fifth. Although the session went without incident, it was briefly paused to inspect the track surface after multiple teams reported tire failures. During the second practice session later that day, Schmidt again lapped the fastest time at 25.977 seconds, quicker than Ray, Grégoire, Buddy Lazier, and Scott Harrington. Ray's lap of 25.729 seconds was the quickest of the third practice session on Saturday morning, with Sharp in second, Dismore in third, Schmidt in fourth, and Harrington in fifth.

The qualifying session was held at noon on Saturday under humid conditions. Each driver was required to complete up to two timed laps, with the fastest of the two determining their starting position. Schmidt earned his first career pole position with a time of 25.780 seconds. He was joined on the grid's front row by Dismore, who qualified on the front row for the fourth time in the season with a lap that was 0.045 seconds slower than Schmidt's. Bräck drove a G-Force chassis for the first time since 1997 and took third, ahead of Ray in fourth and Goodyear in fifth. Sharp, Tyce Carlson, John Hollansworth Jr., Billy Boat, and Buddy Lazier occupied the remaining top-10 positions, while Grégoire, Harrington, Robby Unser, Johnny Unser, and Donnie Beechler started 11th through 15th. Calkins only completed one lap, which left him in 16th, because he thought the checkered flag was flown at the end of his first lap. While Jeff Ward qualified 17th, Eddie Cheever took 18th after spinning in turn three during his second timed lap. The final eight positions on the grid were taken by Robby McGehee, Jaques Lazier, Buhl, Eliseo Salazar, Hamilton, Ronnie Johncox, and series debutants Ribbs and Jönsson. On Saturday afternoon, Buddy Lazier lapped quickest in the final practice session with a time of 25.977 seconds. Robby Unser, Ray, Jerry Unser, and Hollansworth Jr. rounded out the top-five.

=== Qualifying classification ===
Pos	No.	Driver	Team	Time	Speed	Grid
1	99	(United States) Sam Schmidt	Treadway Racing	25.780	209.465	1
2	28	(United States) Mark Dismore	Kelley Racing	25.825	209.100	2
3	14	(Sweden) Kenny Bräck	A. J. Foyt Racing	25.889	208.583	3
4	2	(United States) Greg Ray	Team Menard	25.916	208.365	4
5	4	(Canada) Scott Goodyear	Panther Racing	25.921	208.325	5
6	8	(United States) Scott Sharp	Kelley Racing	25.967	207.956	6
7	20	(United States) Tyce Carlson	Blueprint-Immke Racing	26.045	207.333	7
8	42	(United States) John Hollansworth Jr.	Team Xtreme	26.108	206.833	8
9	11	(United States) Billy Boat	A. J. Foyt Racing	26.116	206.770	9
10	91	(United States) Buddy Lazier	Hemelgarn Racing	26.117	206.762	10
11	7	(France) Stéphan Grégoire	Dick Simon Racing	26.118	206.754	11
12	66	(United States) Scott Harrington	Harrington Motorsports	26.166	206.375	12
13	81	(United States) Robby Unser	Team Pelfrey	26.183	206.241	13
14	92	(United States) Johnny Unser	Hemelgarn Racing	26.189	206.193	14
15	98	(United States) Donnie Beechler	Cahill Racing	26.285	205.440	15
16	12	(United States) Buzz Calkins	Bradley Motorsports	26.311	205.237	16
17	21	(United States) Jeff Ward	Pagan Racing	26.325	205.128	17
18	51	(United States) Eddie Cheever	Team Cheever	26.357	204.879	18
19	55	(United States) Robby McGehee	Conti Racing	26.364	204.825	19
20	33	(United States) Jaques Lazier	Truscelli Team Racing	26.451	204.151	20
21	22	(United States) Robbie Buhl	TriStar Motorsports	26.463	204.058	21
22	6	(Chile) Eliseo Salazar	Nienhouse Racing	26.466	204.035	22
23	9	(United States) Davey Hamilton	Galles Racing	26.710	202.171	26^{1}
24	17	(United States) Ronnie Johncox	TriStar Motorsports	26.735	201.982	23
25	30	(United States) Willy T. Ribbs	McCormack Motorsports	26.840	201.192	24
26	27	(Sweden) Niclas Jönsson	Blueprint-Immke Racing	27.138	198.983	25

Notes

- ^1 — Davey Hamilton switched to a backup car before the race and was forced to start at the rear.

== Race ==
Weather conditions towards the start of the race were dry and muggy; air temperatures were at 98 °F (37 °C) and track temperatures were recorded as high as 132 °F (56 °C). Approximately 32,000 people attended the event. Singer Serena Henry performed the national anthem and judge William D. Jansen commanded the drivers to start their engines. The race began at 11:42 AM PDT (UTC−07:00) with Vegas.com president Danny Greenspun waving the green flag. In the United States, it was broadcast live on television by ESPN2, with Bob Jenkins and Arie Luyendyk serving as commentators and Jack Arute and Vince Welch taking the roles of pit reporters. Hamilton was required to fall to the rear of the field during the pace laps for resorting to a backup car prior to the race.

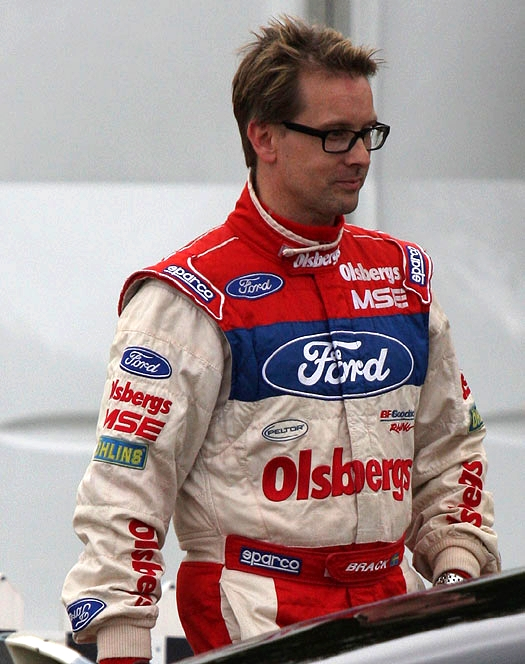
Kenny Bräck (pictured in 2012), who led a race-high 118 laps.

On the first lap, Dismore accelerated faster than Schmidt and briefly took the lead before the first caution flag of the race was flown for Beechler spinning in turn two. As Schmidt took back the lead at the end of the lap, Hamilton spun into the third-turn wall and collided with Grégoire. Beechler relayed to his team that he suspected oil was spilled on the track and drove into pit road for tires and fuel under the caution period. Dismore led the field back up to speed at the restart on lap 6. Bräck made a failed attempt to pass Schmidt for second place in turn one. Johnny Unser spun in turn four two laps later because of his cold tires, bringing out the second caution. Green-flag racing continued on the ninth lap, with Dismore leading ahead of Schmidt and Bräck. Schmidt caught on to Dismore's slipstream and charged past him in turn one on lap 13 to take the lead. By this lap, Hamilton improved to 16th, while Cheever climbed to third by the 17th lap. One lap later, the third caution was necessitated when Ribbs spun and made heavy contact with the wall in the fourth turn, with flames briefly shooting from his car upon impact. During the caution, McGehee made a pit stop to clean any debris he sustained from Ribbs' accident. Beechler's team made adjustments to his car to alleviate the understeer he had been experiencing.

Racing resumed on the 27th lap. Dismore drove to Schmidt's left-hand side in turn four to take the lead on lap 28. The two drivers raced alongside each other before Cheever took the second position from Schmidt on the 29th lap and overtook Dismore for the lead two laps later. Schmidt, meanwhile, fell to sixth place as the drivers passing him took air away from the nose of his car, although he managed to get by Goodyear for fifth on the 33rd lap. Ward made a stop six laps later as he believed one of his tires was flattening. Robby Unser took second place from Bräck on lap 41, only for Unser to lose second and third to Bräck and Schmidt, respectively, by the 45th lap. Buddy Lazier struggled with handling and dove into pit road that same lap for his crew to replace his car's CPU. On lap 49, the fourth caution was issued after Goodyear made a 180-degree spin into the wall in turn four. Most of the leaders made pit stops under the caution. Ray and Schmidt's engines stalled but were quickly refired, while Boat was forced to pit twice after an issue with a fuel hose hindered his first stop.

Grégoire elected not to make a stop and led at the lap-58 restart, followed by Jönsson, Cheever, Bräck, and Dismore. Cheever promptly passed Jönsson for second and took the lead from Grégoire on the 60th lap, by which point Bräck had moved into third place. Grégoire lost the second position to Bräck on lap 64, and by the 70th lap, he fell to fourth behind Dismore. Three laps later, Bräck overtook Cheever for the lead exiting turn two. As Grégoire was relegated further down the running order, Jaques Lazier passed Dismore for third place on lap 76. Meanwhile, Bräck garnered a 2.7-second lead over Cheever by lap 82. On the 85th lap, Jönsson was forced into an early retirement after a fuel leak burned into his engine's wiring, sparking a fire within his car. Boat and Grégoire made stops for tires and fuel before Johnny Unser slammed the outside wall in turn four, necessitating the fifth caution. During pit stops, Cheever made slight contact with Buddy Lazier, though neither driver sustained damage. Bräck maintained the lead for the lap-102 restart; the sixth caution was flown three laps later as Ray hit the right-rear tire of Dismore's car and slid up into the marbles in turn one. The ensuing restart on lap 110 was cut short when Hollansworth Jr. and Boat collided, spinning both drivers into the turn-one wall along with Dismore, bringing out the seventh caution.

Ray's team attempted to repair his engine under the caution before he shut it off and retired from the race. Three laps after the lap-122 restart, the eighth caution was issued when the right-hand side of Beechler's car made contact with the turn-four wall. Bräck continued holding his lead for the restart on the 133rd lap, ahead of Cheever, Jaques Lazier, Calkins, and Schmidt. Carlson and Johncox were both handed stop-and-go penalties for accelerating faster than other drivers before reaching the start-finish line. Over the next three laps, Calkins lost the fourth and fifth positions to Schmidt and Robby Unser, respectively. Cheever's engine broke on the 138th lap and he exited the race, relinquishing second place to Jaques Lazier. Robby Unser pulled into pit lane a lap later, also with a failing engine. On lap 145, Schmidt got by Jaques Lazier for second place; he then utilized the draft behind Bräck's car to overtake him through the outside line for the lead on lap 150. Schmidt quickly grew a 0.8-second lead over Bräck, which continued to increase until the caution was flown for the ninth time after Johncox contacted the wall at the exit of the second corner. All the leaders, including Schmidt, made stops for tires and fuel during the caution as Jaques Lazier's car lost power on the blend line.

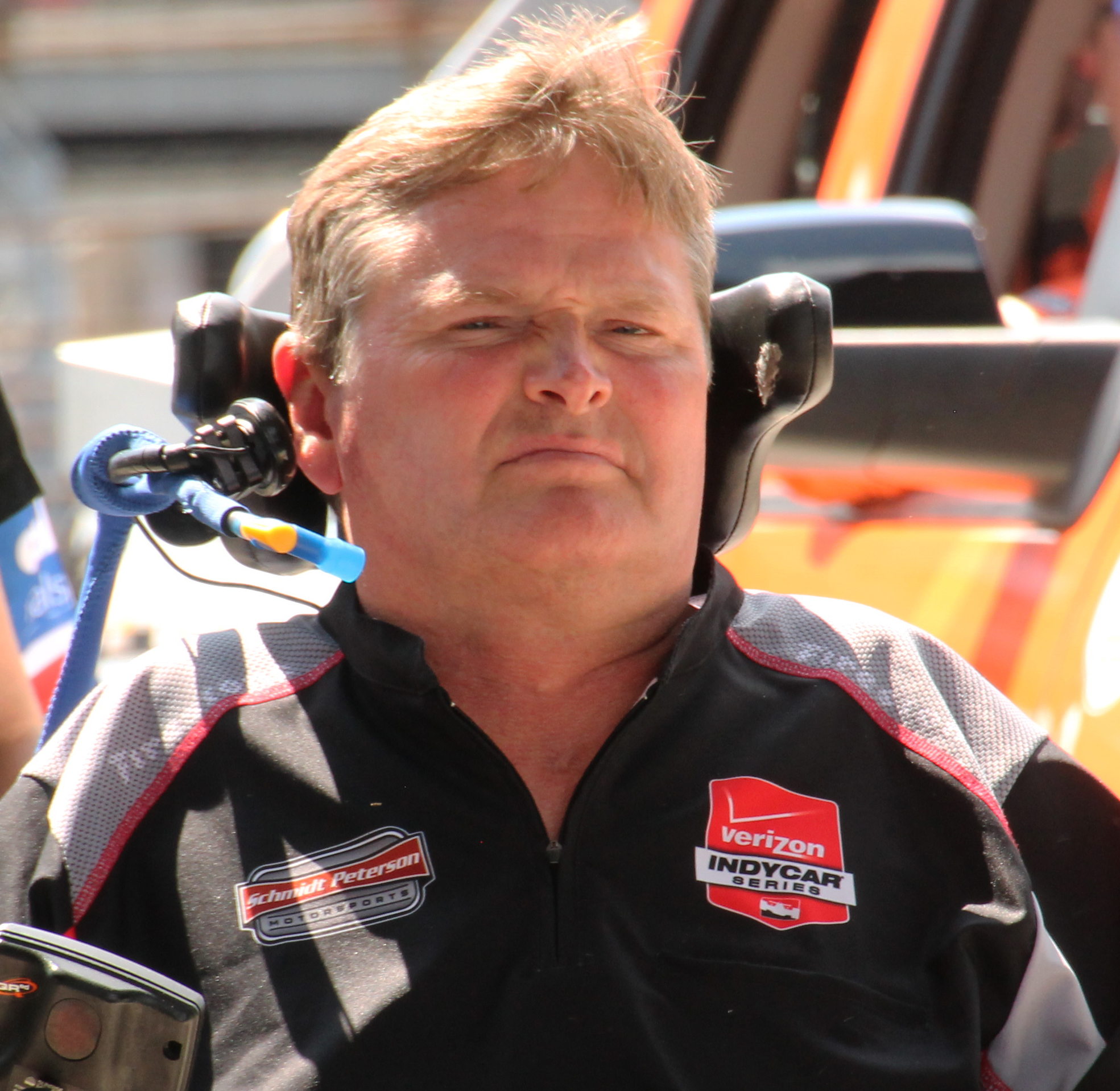
Sam Schmidt (pictured in 2015) earned his first and only Pep Boys Indy Racing League win.

Bräck exited pit road before Schmidt and reclaimed the lead ahead of the restart on lap 170, ahead of Schmidt, Buhl, Hamilton, and Calkins. As Hamilton and Calkins dueled for fourth place, Schmidt closed in on Bräck throughout the next 23 laps, but was unable to pass him. On the 193rd lap, Sharp collided into Hamilton in the third turn, sending Hamilton sliding into the outside wall and prompting the tenth caution of the race. Sharp pitted to repair any damage under the caution. As green-flag racing commenced on lap 197, the eleventh (and final) caution was flown a lap later as Salazar spun exiting turn four and stalled on the apron. Bräck maintained his lead for the restart on the 202nd lap, with Schmidt in second and Buhl in third. Schmidt gradually closed in on Bräck and on lap 206, he steered to the left of Bräck to take the lead on the back stretch. He held onto the lead for the final two laps and earned his first career Pep Boys Indy Racing League win, 0.617 seconds ahead of Bräck. Buhl finished third, with Sharp in fourth, Calkins in fifth, and McGehee, Jaques Lazier, Grégoire, Carlson, and Ward rounding out the top-ten finishers. The last classified finishers were Buddy Lazier, Salazar, and Harrington. There was a total of 11 lead changes among five different drivers and 11 cautions throughout the course of the race. Bräck's total of 118 laps in the lead was the most of any competitor, while Schmidt led four times for a total of 35 laps.

=== Post-race ===
Schmidt, a native of Las Vegas, celebrated his first win with his team in victory lane and earned $146,200. While Schmidt acknowledged the adversities he faced in the race, he was pleased with his car's performance, saying: "I felt like we had the best car out there. It was kind of like, 'Catch me if you can.' I don't mean to be arrogant, but we just had a great package today. We could run 200 to 202 mph all day. The cautions messed us up. We were hoping for long runs. All those yellows didn't help us." It marked Schmidt's only victory in the series before a crash during a testing session at Walt Disney World Speedway in January 2000 left him with a severe spinal injury, thus becoming a quadriplegic. Schmidt never raced in IndyCar competition again, but continued his involvement with IndyCar by forming the Sam Schmidt Motorsports team in 2001. The team has since won numerous races in the IndyCar Series and Indy NXT. Second-place finisher Bräck commented on what he felt caused him to lose the race: "The cars were equal. At the end, tires made the difference. We picked up a bit of a vibration at the end. I drove as hard as I could the whole way. I think he would've caught me even if Salazar hadn't stalled." Buhl was happy with finishing third, stating: "To think we would be on the podium after Friday was a nice surprise. On Friday, we were lost, but the guys did a great job working with the car and the tires. It showed today."

Championship leader Ray was aggravated at Dismore for damaging his car on the 105th lap: "Unfortunately, Mark Dismore had a hard time with turn four. I had a run on him, but he blocked me low. I have no idea why he came into me. He just moved up and bumped me. We came in and changed the front end, but for some reason the impact broke the timing chain. It's hard that something like that will affect our championship run." Dismore was similarly disappointed with his crash, saying: "We were running pretty consistently. We were on our program to make the car last until the end. Unfortunately, sometimes racing has accidents." Goodyear said of his lap-49 accident, which caused a bruise to his left knee: "I could feel something let go and I just got ready for the impact. It happened so quickly and I really felt to that point that I had a great race car. We were just making very slight weight adjustments in the beginning of the race and the car was responding great." Johncox, who suffered a fracture to his left foot, believed his right-front tire punctured, leading to his accident. Ray held onto the lead in the Drivers' Championship with 255 points, although Bräck trimmed his advantage over him to 15 points. Schmidt improved from 12th to third in the standings with 225 points, ahead of fourth-placed Sharp with 209. Goodyear fell to fifth with 207 points as one race remained in the season.

=== Race classification ===
Pos	No.	Driver	Team	Laps	Status	Grid	Points
1	99	(United States) Sam Schmidt	Treadway Racing	208	Running	1	53^{2}
2	14	(Sweden) Kenny Bräck	A. J. Foyt Racing	208	Running	3	43^{3}
3	22	(United States) Robbie Buhl	TriStar Motorsports	208	Running	21	35
4	8	(United States) Scott Sharp	Kelley Racing	208	Running	6	32
5	12	(United States) Buzz Calkins	Bradley Motorsports	207	+1 lap	16	30
6	55	(United States) Robby McGehee	Conti Racing	207	+1 lap	19	28
7	33	(United States) Jaques Lazier	Truscelli Team Racing	205	+3 laps	20	26
8	7	(France) Stéphan Grégoire	Dick Simon Racing	205	+3 laps	11	24
9	20	(United States) Tyce Carlson	Blueprint-Immke Racing	205	+3 laps	7	22
10	21	(United States) Jeff Ward	Pagan Racing	204	+4 laps	17	20
11	91	(United States) Buddy Lazier	Hemelgarn Racing	199	+9 laps	10	19
12	6	(Chile) Eliseo Salazar	Nienhouse Racing	196	+12 laps	22	18
13	9	(United States) Davey Hamilton	Galles Racing	191	Accident	26	17
14	66	(United States) Scott Harrington	Harrington Motorsports	156	+52 laps	12	16
15	17	(United States) Ronnie Johncox	TriStar Motorsports	154	Accident	23	15
16	81	(United States) Robby Unser	Team Pelfrey	139	Fuel pump	13	14
17	51	(United States) Eddie Cheever	Team Cheever	138	Engine	18	13
18	98	(United States) Donnie Beechler	Cahill Racing	121	Accident	15	12
19	42	(United States) John Hollansworth Jr.	Team Xtreme Racing	110	Accident	18	11
20	28	(United States) Mark Dismore	Kelley Racing	110	Accident	2	12^{4}
21	2	(United States) Greg Ray	Team Menard	110	Timing chain	4	9
22	11	(United States) Billy Boat	A. J. Foyt Racing	109	Accident	9	8
23	92	(United States) Johnny Unser	Hemelgarn Racing	90	Accident	14	7
24	27	(Sweden) Niclas Jönsson	Blueprint-Immke Racing	85	Engine	25	6
25	4	(Canada) Scott Goodyear	Panther Racing	47	Accident	5	5
26	30	(United States) Willy T. Ribbs	McCormack Motorsports	16	Accident	24	4

Notes

- ^2 – Includes three bonus points for winning the pole position.
- ^3 – Includes one bonus point for qualifying in third place and two bonus points for leading the most laps.
- ^4 – Includes two bonus points for qualifying in second place.

== Standings after the race ==
Drivers' Championship standings
	Pos.	Driver	Points
Unchanged	1	(United States) Greg Ray	255
1	2	(Sweden) Kenny Bräck	240 (–15)
9	3	(United States) Sam Schmidt	225 (–30)
3	4	(United States) Scott Sharp	209 (–46)
3	5	(Canada) Scott Goodyear	207 (–48)
Sources:

- Note: Only the top five positions are included.

Previous race: 1999 Colorado Indy 200	IndyCar Series; 1999 season	Next race: 1999 Mall.com 500
Previous race: 1998 Las Vegas 500K	Las Vegas 500K	Next race: 2000 Vegas Indy 300
