= 2000 Indy Racing League =

2000 Indy Racing League season
- Indy Racing Northern Light Series
- 2000 Indy Racing League

Season
- Races: ~~10~~ 9
- Start date: January 29
- End date: October 15

Awards
- Drivers' champion: (United States) Buddy Lazier
- Manufacturers' Cup: (United States) Oldsmobile
- Rookie of the Year: (Brazil) Airton Daré
- Indianapolis 500 winner: (Colombia) Juan Pablo Montoya

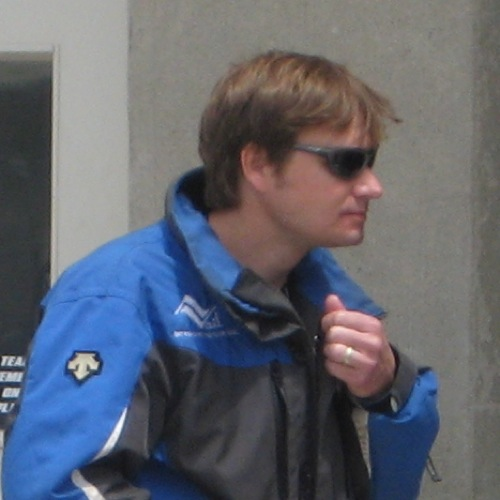
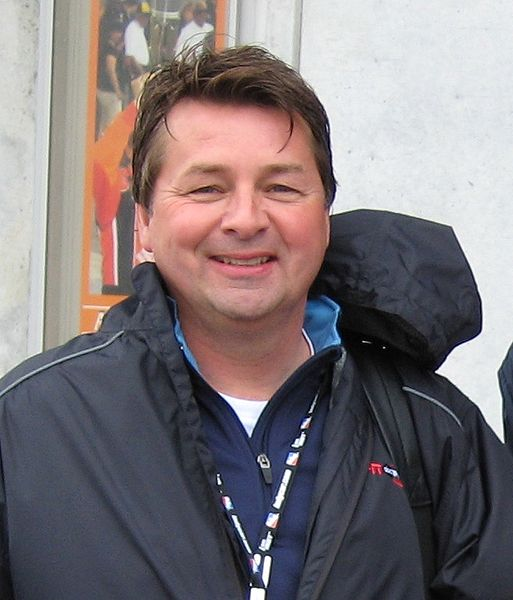
Buddy Lazier (left) won his first and only Drivers' Championship while Scott Goodyear (right) finished second in the championship.

The 2000 Indy Racing Northern Light Series was the fifth season of the Indy Racing League. The season consisted of nine races, all on oval circuits. The showcase event of the season was the 84th running of the Indianapolis 500.

The season saw a high level of parity, as only one driver, champion Buddy Lazier, won more than a single race. It also saw the beginning of the jump from CART as Al Unser Jr. moved to the series full-time and Chip Ganassi Racing came over to run the Indianapolis 500, which it won with driver Juan Pablo Montoya. It was also the final season for the Riley & Scott chassis, which also saw its first series win in 2000.

A planned race at Cleveland – which would have been the Indy Racing League's first road course event – was cancelled on September 9, 1999, and reverted to a CART event.

== Confirmed entries ==
The 5 year tire war between Goodyear and Firestone in both CART and the IRL ended after Goodyear left both series as a tire supplier in 1999. This meant from this season onward all teams used Firestone tires.

	Chassis	Engine	No.	Drivers	Rounds
(United States) Team Menard	Dallara	Oldsmobile	1	(United States) Greg Ray	All
(United States) Team Menard	Dallara	Oldsmobile	32	(United States) Robby Gordon	4
(United States) Galles Racing	G-Force	Oldsmobile	3	(United States) Al Unser Jr.	All
(United States) Panther Racing	Dallara	Oldsmobile	4	(Canada) Scott Goodyear	All
(United States) Treadway Racing	G-Force	Oldsmobile	5	(United States) Robby McGehee	All
(United States) Treadway Racing	G-Force	Oldsmobile	50	(United States) Jason Leffler R	4
(United States) Treadway Racing	G-Force	Oldsmobile	55	(United States) Jason Leffler R	3
(United States) Treadway Racing	G-Force	Oldsmobile	55	(Brazil) Raul Boesel	4
(United States) Treadway Racing	G-Force	Oldsmobile	55	(Japan) Shigeaki Hattori R	5–9
(United States) Tri Star Motorsports	Dallara	Oldsmobile	6	(United States) Jeret Schroeder R	All
(United States) Tri Star Motorsports	Dallara	Oldsmobile	9	(United States) Robby Unser	1
(United States) Tri Star Motorsports	Dallara	Oldsmobile	21	(United States) Dr. Jack Miller	3–4
(United States) Tri Star Motorsports	Dallara	Oldsmobile	21	(Brazil) Zak Morioka R	9
(United States) Dick Simon Racing	G-Force	Oldsmobile	7	(France) Stéphan Grégoire	All
(United States) Dick Simon Racing	G-Force	Oldsmobile	90	(United States) Lyn St. James	4
(United States) Kelley Racing	Dallara	Oldsmobile	8	(United States) Scott Sharp	All
(United States) Kelley Racing	Dallara	Oldsmobile	28	(United States) Mark Dismore	All
(United States) Target Chip Ganassi Racing	G-Force	Oldsmobile	9	(Colombia) Juan Pablo Montoya R	4
(United States) Target Chip Ganassi Racing	G-Force	Oldsmobile	10	(United States) Jimmy Vasser	4
(United States) A. J. Foyt Enterprises	G-Force	Oldsmobile	11	(Chile) Eliseo Salazar	All
(United States) A. J. Foyt Enterprises	G-Force	Oldsmobile	14	(United States) Jeff Ward	All
(United States) A. J. Foyt Enterprises	G-Force	Oldsmobile	41	(United States) Billy Boat	4
(United States) Bradley Motorsports	Dallara	Oldsmobile	12	(United States) Buzz Calkins	All
(United States) Walker Racing	Riley & Scott	Oldsmobile	15	(United States) Sarah Fisher R	2–3
(United States) Walker Racing	Dallara	Oldsmobile	15	(United States) Sarah Fisher R	4–9
(United States) Team Xtreme	G-Force	Oldsmobile	16	(United States) John Hollansworth Jr.	1
(United States) Team Xtreme	G-Force	Oldsmobile	16	(United States) Davey Hamilton	2–8
(United States) Team Xtreme	G-Force	Oldsmobile	16	(United States) Jaques Lazier	9
(United States) Team Xtreme	G-Force	Oldsmobile	88	(Brazil) Airton Daré R	All
(United States) Nienhouse Motorsports	G-Force	Oldsmobile	17	(Sweden) Niclas Jönsson R	2
(United States) Nienhouse Motorsports	G-Force	Oldsmobile	17	(United States) Scott Harrington	3–4
(United States) PDM Racing	Dallara	Oldsmobile	18	(United States) Sam Hornish Jr. R	1–6, 8–9
(United States) Logan Racing	Dallara	Oldsmobile	19	(United States) Billy Roe	5–6
(United States) Logan Racing	Dallara	Oldsmobile	19	(United States) Stevie Reeves R	7–9
(United States) Hubbard-Immke Racing	Dallara	Oldsmobile	20	(United States) Tyce Carlson	1–3, 5–9
(United States) Hubbard-Immke Racing	Dallara	Oldsmobile	20	(Colombia) Roberto Guerrero	4
(United States) Indy Regency Racing	G-Force	Oldsmobile	22	(United States) Johnny Unser	4
(United States) Dreyer & Reinbold Racing	G-Force	Infiniti	23	(United States) Steve Knapp	4
(United States) Dreyer & Reinbold Racing	G-Force	Infiniti	24	(United States) Robbie Buhl	1–3
(United States) Dreyer & Reinbold Racing	G-Force	Oldsmobile	24	(United States) Robbie Buhl	4–9
(United States) Blueprint Racing	G-Force	Oldsmobile	27	(Sweden) Niclas Jönsson R	1
(United States) Blueprint Racing	G-Force	Oldsmobile	27	(United States) Jimmy Kite	2–9
(United States) Byrd-McCormack Racing	Riley & Scott	Oldsmobile	29	(United States) Robby Unser	4
(United States) Byrd-McCormack Racing	Riley & Scott	Oldsmobile	30	(United States) Robby Unser	5–6
(United States) Byrd-McCormack Racing	G-Force	Oldsmobile	30	(United States) Jon Herb R	1
(United States) Byrd-McCormack Racing	G-Force	Oldsmobile	30	(United States) Ronnie Johncox	2–3
(United States) Byrd-McCormack Racing	Riley & Scott	Oldsmobile	30	(United States) Ronnie Johncox	4
(United States) Byrd-McCormack Racing	Riley & Scott	Oldsmobile	30	(United States) J. J. Yeley	7–9
(United States) Truscelli Team Racing	G-Force	Oldsmobile	33	(United States) Jaques Lazier	1, 3–6
(United States) Truscelli Team Racing	G-Force	Oldsmobile	33	(United States) Bobby Regester R	2
(United States) Team Coulson Racing	G-Force	Oldsmobile	40	(United States) Davy Jones	4
(United States) Team Coulson Racing	G-Force	Oldsmobile	40	(Colombia) Roberto Guerrero	8
(Canada) Mid America Motorsports	Dallara	Oldsmobile	43	(Canada) Doug Didero R	1–6
(Canada) Mid America Motorsports	Dallara	Oldsmobile	43	(United States) Scott Harrington	7
(Canada) Mid America Motorsports	Dallara	Oldsmobile	43	(United States) Jaques Lazier	8
(Canada) Mid America Motorsports	Dallara	Oldsmobile	43	(United States) Davey Hamilton	9
(United States) Sinden Racing	Dallara	Oldsmobile	44	(United States) Davey Hamilton	1
(United States) Fast Track Racing Enterprises	Dallara	Oldsmobile	48	(United States) Andy Hillenburg R	4
(United States) Fast Track Racing Enterprises	Dallara	Oldsmobile	48	(United States) Dan Drinan R	4
(United States) Team Cheever	Riley & Scott	Infiniti	51	(United States) Eddie Cheever	1–2
(United States) Team Cheever	Dallara	Infiniti	51	(United States) Eddie Cheever	3–9
(United States) Team Cheever	Dallara	Infiniti	52	(United States) Ross Cheever	4
(United States) Pagan Racing	Dallara	Oldsmobile	75	(United States) Richie Hearn	4
(United States) Team Pelfrey	Dallara	Oldsmobile	81	(United States) Billy Boat	1–3, 5–9
(United States) Team Pelfrey	Dallara	Oldsmobile	82	(United States) Memo Gidley	4
(United States) Hemelgarn Racing	Riley & Scott	Oldsmobile	91	(United States) Buddy Lazier	1–3
(United States) Hemelgarn Racing	Dallara	Oldsmobile	91	(United States) Buddy Lazier	4–9
(United States) Hemelgarn Racing	Dallara	Oldsmobile	92	(United States) Stan Wattles	4
(United States) Cahill Racing	Dallara	Oldsmobile	98	(United States) Donnie Beechler	All

== Schedule ==
Rnd	Date	Race Name	Track	City
1	January 29	Delphi Indy 200	Walt Disney World Speedway	Bay Lake, Florida
2	March 19	MCI WorldCom Indy 200	Phoenix International Raceway	Phoenix, Arizona
3	April 22	Vegas Indy 300	Las Vegas Motor Speedway	Las Vegas, Nevada
4	May 28	84th Indianapolis 500	Indianapolis Motor Speedway	Speedway, Indiana
5	June 11	Casino Magic 500	Texas Motor Speedway	Fort Worth, Texas
6	June 18	Radisson 200	Pikes Peak International Raceway	Fountain, Colorado
7	July 15	Midas 500 Classic	Atlanta Motor Speedway	Hampton, Georgia
8	August 27	Belterra Resort Indy 300	Kentucky Speedway	Sparta, Kentucky
9	October 15	Excite 500	Texas Motor Speedway	Fort Worth, Texas

== Results ==
Rd.	Race	Pole position	Fastest lap	Most laps led	Race winner			
Rd.	Race	Pole position	Fastest lap	Most laps led	Driver	Team	Chassis	Engine
1	Walt Disney World	(United States) Greg Ray	(United States) Mark Dismore	(United States) Robbie Buhl	(United States) Robbie Buhl	Dreyer & Reinbold Racing	G-Force	Oldsmobile
2	Phoenix	(United States) Greg Ray	(United States) Tyce Carlson	(United States) Scott Sharp	(United States) Buddy Lazier	Hemelgarn Racing	Riley & Scott	Oldsmobile
3	Las Vegas	(United States) Mark Dismore	(United States) Mark Dismore	(United States) Mark Dismore	(United States) Al Unser Jr.	Galles Racing	G-Force	Oldsmobile
4	Indianapolis	(United States) Greg Ray	(United States) Buddy Lazier	(Colombia) Juan Pablo Montoya	(Colombia) Juan Pablo Montoya	Chip Ganassi Racing	G-Force	Oldsmobile
5	Texas 1	(United States) Buddy Lazier	(United States) Eddie Cheever	(United States) Al Unser Jr.	(United States) Scott Sharp	Kelley Racing	Dallara	Oldsmobile
6	Pikes Peak	(United States) Greg Ray	(United States) Buzz Calkins	(United States) Scott Sharp	(United States) Eddie Cheever	Team Cheever	Dallara	Infiniti
7	Atlanta	(United States) Greg Ray	(United States) Donnie Beechler	(United States) Greg Ray	(United States) Greg Ray	Team Menard	Dallara	Oldsmobile
8	Kentucky	(Canada) Scott Goodyear	(United States) Buddy Lazier	(Canada) Scott Goodyear	(United States) Buddy Lazier	Hemelgarn Racing	Dallara	Oldsmobile
9	Texas 2	(United States) Greg Ray	(United States) Jaques Lazier	(United States) Al Unser Jr.	(Canada) Scott Goodyear	Panther Racing	Dallara	Oldsmobile

Note: All races running on Oval/Speedway.

== Race summaries ==
=== Delphi Indy 200 ===
The final Delphi Indy 200 race was held January 29 at Walt Disney World Speedway. Greg Ray won the pole.

Top ten results

1. 24- Robbie Buhl
2. 91- Buddy Lazier
3. 51- Eddie Cheever
4. 4- Scott Goodyear
5. 11- Eliseo Salazar
6. 98- Donnie Beechler
7. 14- Jeff Ward
8. 12- Buzz Calkins
9. 81- Billy Boat
10. 55- Robby McGehee
- This was Robbie Buhl's 2nd and final IndyCar victory.
- This was the final Indy Racing League event at the track.

=== MCI WorldCom Indy 200 ===
This race was held March 19 at Phoenix International Raceway. Greg Ray won the pole.

Top ten results

1. 91- Buddy Lazier
2. 4- Scott Goodyear
3. 98- Donnie Beechler
4. 11- Eliseo Salazar
5. 8- Scott Sharp
6. 81- Billy Boat
7. 24- Robbie Buhl
8. 7- Stephan Gregoire
9. 3- Al Unser Jr.
10. 51- Eddie Cheever
- This was the first victory for the Riley & Scott chassis

=== Vegas Indy 300 ===
This race was held April 22 at Las Vegas Motor Speedway. Mark Dismore won the pole.

Top ten results

1. 3- Al Unser Jr.
2. 28- Mark Dismore
3. 18- Sam Hornish Jr. R
4. 6- Jeret Schroeder R
5. 24- Robbie Buhl
6. 5- Robby McGehee
7. 81- Billy Boat
8. 20- Tyce Carlson
9. 1- Greg Ray
10. 33- Jaques Lazier
- This was Al Unser Jr.'s 1st victory since the 1995 CART Molson Indy Vancouver and his 1st IRL victory.

=== 84th Indianapolis 500 ===
The Indy 500 was held May 28 at Indianapolis Motor Speedway. Greg Ray sat on pole.

Top ten results

1. 9- Juan Pablo Montoya R
2. 91- Buddy Lazier
3. 11- Eliseo Salazar
4. 14- Jeff Ward
5. 51- Eddie Cheever
6. 32- Robby Gordon
7. 10- Jimmy Vasser
8. 7- Stephan Gregoire
9. 4- Scott Goodyear
10. 8- Scott Sharp
- Juan Pablo Montoya was the 1st rookie since Graham Hill (1966) to win the Indianapolis 500 as a rookie.
- Buddy Lazier took over the points lead after this race by 26 points over Robbie Buhl.

=== Casino Magic 500 ===
This race was held June 11 at Texas Motor Speedway. Qualifying was rained out and Buddy Lazier was on the pole based on points standings.

Top ten results

1. 8- Scott Sharp
2. 5- Robby McGehee
3. 3- Al Unser Jr.
4. 12- Buzz Calkins
5. 4- Scott Goodyear
6. 28- Mark Dismore
7. 91- Buddy Lazier
8. 55- Shigeaki Hattori R
9. 51- Eddie Cheever
10. 88- Airton Daré R
- This was Robby McGehee's best ever finish.
- Shigeaki Hattori debuts after a disappointing 1999 CART season which ended after his CART competition license was revoked at Laguna Seca.

=== Radisson 200 ===
This race was held June 18 at Pikes Peak International Raceway. Greg Ray won the pole.

Top ten results

1. 51- Eddie Cheever
2. 88- Airton Daré R
3. 8- Scott Sharp
4. 28- Mark Dismore
5. 98- Donnie Beechler
6. 11- Eliseo Salazar
7. 6- Jeret Schroeder R
8. 7- Stephan Gregoire
9. 33- Jaques Lazier
10. 3- Al Unser Jr.
- This was the Infiniti engine's 1st victory.
- This was Cheevers penultimate IndyCar victory.

=== Midas 500 Classic ===
This race was held July 15 at Atlanta Motor Speedway. Greg Ray won the pole.

Top ten results

1. 1- Greg Ray
2. 91- Buddy Lazier
3. 3- Al Unser Jr.
4. 5- Robby McGehee
5. 98- Donnie Beechler
6. 24- Robbie Buhl
7. 7- Stephan Gregoire
8. 81- Billy Boat
9. 55- Shigeaki Hattori R
10. 11- Eliseo Salazar

=== Belterra Resort Indy 300 ===
The inaugural Indy Racing League event was held August 27 at Kentucky Speedway. Scott Goodyear won the pole.

Top ten results

1. 91- Buddy Lazier
2. 4- Scott Goodyear
3. 15- Sarah Fisher R
4. 51- Eddie Cheever
5. 7- Stephan Gregoire
6. 14- Jeff Ward
7. 1- Greg Ray
8. 55- Shigeaki Hattori R
9. 18- Sam Hornish Jr. R
10. 98- Donnie Beechler
- This was Roberto Guerrero's final IndyCar race he qualified for. He would blow an engine after completing 48 laps and would finish 23rd.
- Sarah Fisher becomes the first woman to lead laps and finish on the Podium in an IRL race.

=== Excite 500 ===
This race was held October 15 at Texas Motor Speedway. Greg Ray won the pole.

Top ten results

1. 4- Scott Goodyear
2. 51- Eddie Cheever
3. 81- Billy Boat
4. 91- Buddy Lazier
5. 11- Eliseo Salazar
6. 98- Donnie Beechler
7. 55- Shigeaki Hattori R
8. 14- Jeff Ward
9. 12- Buzz Calkins
10. 16- Jaques Lazier
- This was the final race victory for Scott Goodyear as he lost his ride to Sam Hornish Jr. in the off-season, then during the 2001 Indianapolis 500 he would suffer career ending injuries after a huge accident during that race.

== Points standings ==
Pos	Driver	WDW	PHX	LVS	INDY	TMS1	PPR	ATL	KEN	TMS2	Pts
1	(United States) Buddy Lazier	2	1	22	2	**7**	26	2	1	4	290
2	(Canada) Scott Goodyear	4	2	12	9	5	16	11	**2***	1	272
3	(United States) Eddie Cheever	3	10	11	5	9	1	21	4	2	257
4	(Chile) Eliseo Salazar	5	4	18	3	17	6	10	25	5	210
5	(United States) Mark Dismore	16	16	**2***	11	6	4	18	11	14	202
6	(United States) Donnie Beechler	6	3	26	12	22	5	5	10	6	202
7	(United States) Scott Sharp	15	5*	27	10	1	3*	16	24	13	196
8	(United States) Robbie Buhl	1*	7	5	26	18	23	6	13	18	190
9	(United States) Al Unser Jr.	25	9	1	29	3*	10	3	27	17*	188
10	(United States) Billy Boat	9	6	7	15	23	18	8	18	3	181
11	(United States) Jeff Ward	7	11	21	4	19	15	19	6	8	176
12	(United States) Robby McGehee	10	24	6	21	2	13	4	14	24	174
13	(United States) Greg Ray	**17**	**19**	9	**33**	15	**20**	**1***	7	**26**	172
14	(France) Stéphan Grégoire	18	8	28	8	11	8	7	5	20	171
15	(United States) Buzz Calkins	8	23	25	18	4	12	23	12	9	145
16	(Brazil) Airton Daré RY	11	22	14	25	10	2	25	19	12	142
17	(United States) Jeret Schroeder R	19	12	4	14	21	7	24	26	16	136
18	(United States) Sarah Fisher R		13	17	31	12	25	14	3	11	124
19	(United States) Tyce Carlson	13	15	8	Wth	13	11	13	22	23	124
20	(United States) Jaques Lazier	23		10	13	14	9		20	10	112
21	(United States) Sam Hornish Jr. R	20	17	3	24	20	19		9	27	110
22	(Japan) Shigeaki Hattori R					8	17	9	8	7	109
23	(United States) Davey Hamilton	26	18	20	20	24	14	15	16	19	98
24	(United States) Jimmy Kite		26	16	30	16	24	12	17	21	79
25	(Colombia) Juan Pablo Montoya				1*						54
26	(Canada) Doug Didero R	14	25	19	DNQ	27	22				43
27	(United States) Ronnie Johncox		14	13	Wth						33
28	(United States) J. J. Yeley							17	15	25	33
29	(United States) Robby Gordon				6						28
30	(United States) Jason Leffler R			15	17						28
31	(Sweden) Niclas Jönsson R	12	21								27
32	(United States) Jimmy Vasser				7						26
33	(United States) Stevie Reeves R							22	21	22	25
34	(United States) Robby Unser	24			DNQ	26	21				19
35	(United States) Scott Harrington			23	DNQ			20			17
36	(Brazil) Zak Morioka R									15	15
37	(Brazil) Raul Boesel				16						14
38	(United States) Steve Knapp				19						11
39	(United States) Bobby Regester R		20								10
40	(United States) John Hollansworth Jr.	21									9
41	(United States) Jon Herb R	22									8
42	(United States) Johnny Unser				22						8
43	(United States) Stan Wattles				23						7
44	(Colombia) Roberto Guerrero				DNQ				23		7
45	(United States) Dr. Jack Miller			24	DNQ						6
46	(United States) Billy Roe					25					5
47	(United States) Richie Hearn				27						3
48	(United States) Andy Hillenburg R				28						2
49	(United States) Lyn St. James				32						1
–	(United States) Dan Drinan				DNQ						0
–	(United States) Memo Gidley				DNQ						0
–	(United States) Davy Jones				DNQ						0
–	(United States) Ross Cheever				Wth						0
–	(Japan) Hideshi Matsuda				Wth						0
Pos	Driver	WDW	PHX	LVS	INDY	TMS1	PPR	ATL	KEN	TMS2	Pts

Color	Result
Gold	Winner
Silver	2nd place
Bronze	3rd place
Green	4th & 5th place
Light Blue	6th–10th place
Dark Blue	Finished (Outside Top 10)
Purple	Did not finish (Ret)
Red	Did not qualify (DNQ)
Brown	Withdrawn (Wth)
Black	Disqualified (DSQ)
White	Did not start (DNS)
Blank	Did not participate (DNP)
Blank	Not competing

**In-line notation**
**Bold**	Pole position (2 points)
Italics	Ran fastest race lap
*	Led most race laps (1 point)
DNS	Any driver who qualifies but does not start (DNS), earns all the points had they taken part.
RY	Rookie of the Year
R	Rookie

- Ties in points broken by number of wins, followed by number of 2nds, 3rds, etc., and then by number of pole positions, followed by number of times qualified 2nd, etc.

Additional points were awarded to the pole winner (3 points), the second best qualifier (2 points), the third best qualifier (1 point) and to the driver leading the most laps (2 point).

== See also ==
- 2000 Indianapolis 500
- 2000 Indy Lights season
- 2000 CART season
- 2000 Toyota Atlantic Championship season
- https://web.archive.org/web/20160304065043/http://www.champcarstats.com/year/2000i.htm
- http://media.indycar.com/pdf/2011/IICS_2011_Historical_Record_Book_INT6.pdf (p. 130–131)

== Bibliography ==
- Johnson, Paul, ed. (2000). Indy Review 2000, Volume 10: Complete Coverage of the 2000 Indy Racing League Season. St. Paul, MN: MBI Publishing Company. ISBN 978-0-7603-0970-4.
