= Beck Motorsports =

IndyCar Series team

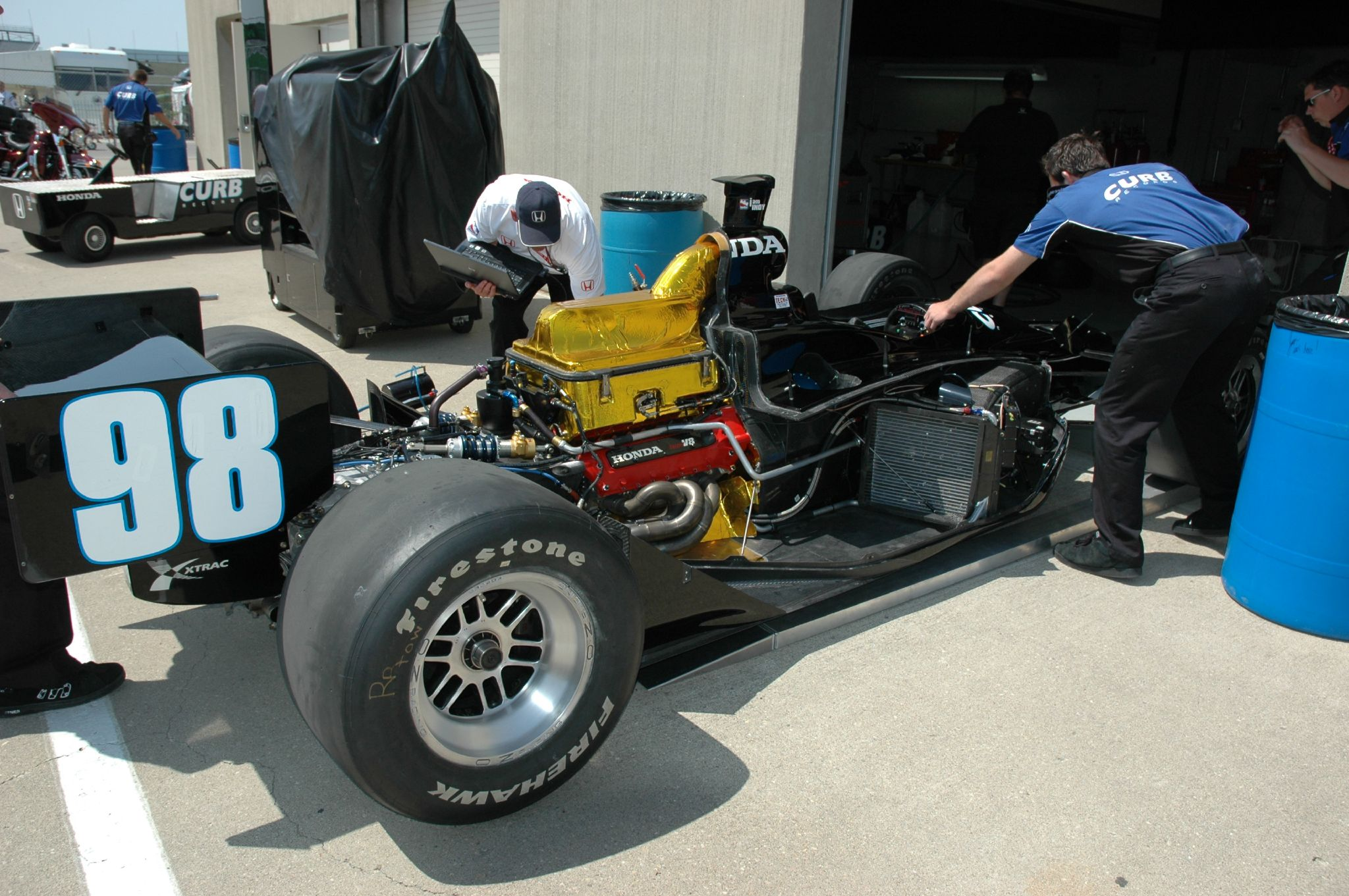
CURB/Agajanian/Beck mechanics working on the #98 car in the garage during a practice session for the 2007 Indianapolis 500

Beck Motorsports was a team in the Indy Racing League IndyCar Series owned by Greg Beck. At times in its history the team was partnered with Curb Agajanian Performance Group and 3G Racing owners Stanton Barrett and Steve Sudler.

== IndyCar ==
=== 1995–2000 ===
Beck Motorsports first arrived in 1995 to field an entry for Japanese driver Hideshi Matsuda in the Indianapolis 500 and finished 15th. In 1996 with the split in major open-wheel racing, the team sided with the Indy Racing League and fielded a full-time entry for Robbie Buhl who finished 3rd in the series' first race at Walt Disney World Speedway and finished 3rd in points. They also fielded another Indy 500 entry for Matsuda who finished a career-best 8th. Buhl began the 1996 races of the 1996-1997 season but left for the powerhouse Team Menard in 1997, leaving Beck to only field an entry for Dennis Vitolo in the Indy 500. The team suffered from severely underpowered Infiniti engines and had to controversially rely on a guaranteed starting position from the "25 and 8 rule" based on their points from the 1996 season in order to make the race. Vitolo finished 15th. Beck Motorsports did not return for the 1998 season.

They returned for a one-off entry for the 1999 Indianapolis 500, again with Matsuda who qualified and finished 10th. Matsuda returned in 2000 but failed to qualify.

=== 2001: First partnership with Curb Agajanian ===
For the 2001 season, the team partnered with Curb Agajanian Performance Group and returned to full-time competition with veteran driver Billy Boat. Boat finished 2nd at Nashville Superspeedway and finished 4th in points.

=== 2002–2003 ===
In 2002 Beck Motorsports fielded a car in 3 mid-season races for Robby McGehee. Beck fielded a car at Motegi and the Indy 500 for Japanese former F1 driver Shinji Nakano who finished 14th. He also fielded an entry for former F1 driver Johnny Herbert which failed to attempt to qualify during Pole Day on May 11th, when he failed to get his car in line when the gun went off at 6 pm. Due to a previous commitment, Herbert was replaced by Memo Gidley for the second weekend of qualifying, and was withdrawn.

=== 2004–2009: Second partnership with Curb Agajanian ===
In 2004 CURB/Agajanian/Beck Motorsports came into being and P. J. Jones drove their entry in the Indy 500 to a 28th place DNF. In 2005, the team fielded a last-minute Indy 500 entry for rookie Arie Luyendyk Jr., however the car never handled properly and Luyendyk's best speed was easily bumped by Felipe Giaffone, leaving Luyendyk and the C/A/B team the only entry bumped from the field that year.

The team merged with Team Leader Motorsports to field 2 cars for the 2006 Indianapolis 500. The first team with driver P. J. Jones was Beck Motorsports owned by Greg Beck which was founded in 1995. The second team driven by Stephan Gregoire was owned by Kent Baker which was founded in 1988. Both Baker and Beck had many years experience working with their own and various other Indy Car teams. They were joined by Cary Agajanian and Mike Curb of Curb Agajanian Motorsports. The two teams ended their partnership for 2007 with P. J. Jones competing for Team Leader Motorsports.

The team made a surprise entry into the 2007 XM Satellite Radio Indy 300 at Homestead-Miami Speedway and participated in it, the Kansas Speedway race and the Indy 500. Alex Barron drove in all 3 races and finished 15th in the Indy 500, 1 lap down.

The team made its 2008 debut at Twin Ring Motegi with Roger Yasukawa at the controls. Yasukawa also attempted to qualify the Curb Records car in the Indianapolis 500 as well but was bumped from the field.

In 2009, the team fielded a full-time IndyCar Series entry, beginning the season with NASCAR driver Stanton Barrett behind the wheel. Barrett and sports marketer Steve Sudler both joined as partners of the team and the new name was CURB/Agajanian/3G Racing (3 Guys Racing). Jaques Lazier was brought on to replace Barrett at Texas Motor Speedway after the team went home after a practice crash the previous week at the Milwaukee Mile. Lazier drove the next three oval races and Richard Antinucci was brought in to drive the remaining road and street course races of the schedule. Barrett drove at Twin Ring Motegi, where he had sponsorship, and Lazier drove on all other remaining ovals.

=== 2010 ===
The team did not announce any plans for 2010, but Sudler indicated in an interview that they hoped to find sponsorship to run a full schedule for Antinucci and a part-time schedule for Barrett. The team did not appear at any races in 2010.

== Past drivers ==
=== CART/IRL IndyCar Series ===
==== Beck Motorsports ====
- (United States) Robbie Buhl (1996-1997)
- (Japan) Hideshi Matsuda (1995-1996, 1998-1999)
- (United States) Robby McGehee (2002)
- (Japan) Shinji Nakano (2003)
- (United States) Dennis Vitolo (1997)

==== CURB/Agajanian/Beck ====
- (United States) Alex Barron (2007)
- (United States) Billy Boat (2001-2002)
- (United States) P. J. Jones (2004)
- (United States) Roger Yasukawa (2008)

==== Team Leader Motorsports ====
- (France) Stephan Gregoire (2006)
- (United States) P. J. Jones (2006)

==== CURB/Agaganian/3G Racing ====
- (United States) Richard Antinucci (2009)
- (United States) Stanton Barrett (2009)
- (United States) Jaques Lazier (2009)

== Race results ==
=== CART FedEx Championship Results ===
(key) (results in bold indicate pole position) (results in italics indicate fastest lap)

Year	Chassis	Engine	Drivers	No.	1	2	3	4	5	6	7	8	9	10	11	12	13	14	15	16	17
1995					MIA	SFR	PHX	LBH	NAZ	INDY	MIL	DET	POR	ROA	TOR	CLE	MCH	MDO	NHA	VAN	LAG
1995	Lola T95/00	Ford XB	(Japan) Hideshi Matsuda	54						15											

=== Indy Racing League Results ===
(key) (Results in bold indicate pole position; results in italics indicate fastest lap)

Year	Chassis	Engine	Drivers	No.	1	2	3	4	5	6	7	8	9	10	11	12	13	14	15	16	17	18	19
Beck Motorsports
1996					WDW	PHX	INDY																
1996	Lola T94; Reynard 94I (Note: Used at Walt Disney World.)	Ford Cosworth	(Japan) Hideshi Matsuda	52			8																
1996	Lola T94; Reynard 94I	Ford Cosworth	(United States) Robbie Buhl	54	3	13	9																
1996–97					NHA	LSV	WDW	PHX	INDY	TXS	PPIR	CLT	NHA	LSV									
1996–97	Lola T94	Ford Cosworth	(United States) Robbie Buhl	54	22	8																	
1996–97	Dallara IR7	Infiniti	(United States) Dennis Vitolo	54					15														
1999					WDW	PHX	INDY	TXS	PPIR	ATL	DOV	PPIR	LSV	TXS									
1999	Dallara IR9	Infiniti	(Japan) Hideshi Matsuda	54			10																
Curb-Agajanian-Beck Motorsports
2001					PHX	HMS	ATL	INDY	TXS	PPIR	RIR	KAN	NSH	KTY	GAT	CHI	TXS						
2001	Dallara IR-01	Oldsmobile Aurora V8	(United States) Billy Boat	98	5	13	14	9	5	4	18	9	2	6	6	12	12						
Beck Motorsports
2002					HMS	PHX	FON	NAZ	INDY	TXS	PPIR	RIR	KAN	NSH	MCH	KTY	GAT	CHI	TXS				
2002	Dallara IR-02	Chevrolet Indy V8	(United States) Robby McGehee	54							17	9	13										
2003					HMS	PHX	MOT	INDY	TXS	PPIR	RIR	KAN	NSH	MCH	GAT	KTY	NAZ	CHI	FON	TXS			
2003	Dallara IR-03	Honda Indy V8	(Japan) Shinji Nakano	54			11	14															
Curb-Agajanian Motorsports
2004					HMS	PHX	MOT	INDY	TXS	RIR	KAN	NSH	MIL	MCH	KTY	PPIR	NAZ	CHI	FON	TXS			
2004	Dallara IR-04	Chevrolet Indy V8	(United States) P. J. Jones	98				28															
2005					HMS	PHX	STP	MOT	INDY	TXS	RIR	KAN	NSH	MIL	MCH	KTY	PPIR	SNM	CHI	WGL	FON		
2005	Dallara IR-05	Chevrolet Indy V8	(Netherlands) Arie Luyendyk Jr. **(R)**	98					DNQ														
Team Leader Motorsports
2006					HMS	STP	MOT	INDY	WGL	TXS	RIR	KAN	NSH	MIL	MCH	KTY	SNM	CHI					
2006	Panoz	Honda HI6R V8	(France) Stéphan Grégoire	97				29															
2006	Panoz	Honda HI6R V8	(United States) P. J. Jones	98				19															
Curb-Agajanian-Beck Motorsports
2007					HMS	STP	MOT	KAN	INDY	MIL	TXS	IOW	RIR	WGL	NSH	MDO	MCH	KTY	SNM	DET	CHI		
2007	Dallara IR-05	Honda HI7R V8	(United States) Alex Barron	98	19			16	15														
2008					HMS	STP	MOT	LBH	KAN	INDY	MIL	TXS	IOW	RIR	WGL	NSH	MDO	EDM	KTY	SNM	DET	CHI	SRF^{1}
2008	Dallara IR-05	Honda HI7R V8	(United States) Roger Yasukawa	77			14																
2008	Dallara IR-05	Honda HI7R V8	(United States) Roger Yasukawa	98						DNQ													
CURB/Agaganian/3G Racing
2009					STP	LBH	KAN	INDY	MIL	TXS	IOW	RIR	WGL	TOR	EDM	KTY	MDO	SNM	CHI	MOT	HMS		
2009	Dallara IR-05	Honda HI7R V8	(United States) Stanton Barrett **(R)**	98	12	17	17	DNQ	DNS											19			
2009	Dallara IR-05	Honda HI7R V8	(United States) Jaques Lazier	98						18	13	20				23			19		23		
2009	Dallara IR-05	Honda HI7R V8	(United States) Richard Antinucci **(R)**	98									19	21	22		18	15					
