= John Hollansworth Jr. =

American racing driver

John Hollansworth Jr. (born September 18, 1958) is a former driver in the Indy Racing League. He raced in the 1999–2001 seasons with twelve career starts, all but two of them in 1999, including the 1999 Indianapolis 500.

== Racing record ==
=== SCCA National Championship Runoffs ===
Year	Track	Car	Engine	Class	Finish	Start	Status
1994	Mid-Ohio	Plymouth Neon	Plymouth	Showroom Stock C	9	5	Running
1995	Mid-Ohio	Spec Racer	Ford	Spec Racer Ford	34	2	Retired
1995	Mid-Ohio	Spec Racer	Ford	Spec Racer	2	2	Running
1996	Mid-Ohio	Spec Racer	Ford	Spec Racer Ford	6	19	Running
1996	Mid-Ohio	Spec Racer	Ford	Sports Renault	1	1	Running

=== IndyCar results ===
(key)

Year	Team	1	2	3	4	5	6	7	8	9	10	11	12	13	Rank	Points	Ref
1999	Team Xtreme	WDW; 19	PHX; 15	CLT; C	INDY; 13	TXS; 20	PPIR; 16	ATL; 19	DOV; 19	PPI2; 16	LVS; 19	TX2; 5			17th	146	
2000	Team Xtreme	WDW; 21	PHX	LVS	INDY	TXS	PPIR	ATL	KTY	TX2					40th	9	
2001	Blueprint Racing	PHX	HMS; 18	ATL	INDY	TXS	PPI	RIR	KAN	NSH	KTY	STL	CHI	TX2	43rd	12	
