= Mark Dismore =

American racing driver

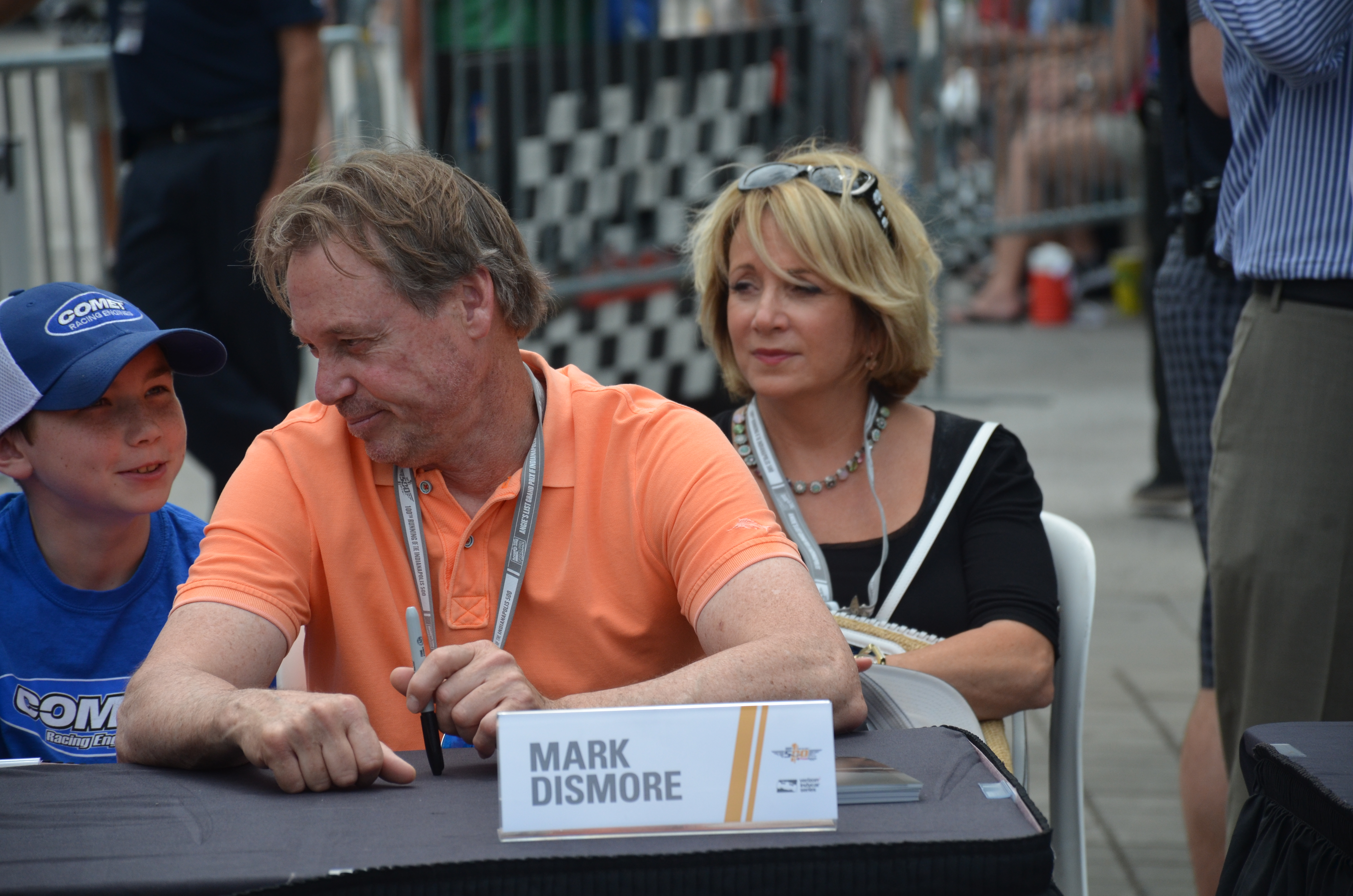
- Dismore at the 2016 Indianapolis 500
- Nationality: American
- Born: October 12, 1956 (age 70) Greenfield, Indiana, U.S.
- Retired: 2002

Indy Racing League IndyCar Series
- Years active: 1996–2002
- Teams: Team Menard; PDM Racing; Kelley Racing; Sam Schmidt Motorsports
- Starts: 58
- Wins: 1
- Poles: 4
- Best finish: 3rd in 1999

Previous series
- 1989, 1991–1992 1992–1995: CART; Toyota Atlantic

Championship titles
- 1990: North American Formula Atlantic

Awards
- 1993: 24 Hours of Daytona Overall win

Mark Dismore (born October 12, 1956, in Greenfield, Indiana) is an American former racecar driver. In Indy Racing League he won the fall 1999 Texas Motor Speedway race and earned four pole positions out of 62 starts. He finished a career-best third in points in 1999. Dismore claimed the 1990 Toyota Pacific championship, and won the 1993 24 Hours of Daytona with All American Racers in a Toyota GTP car with co-drivers Rocky Moran and P. J. Jones.

Dismore was badly injured in a practice crash for the 1991 Indianapolis 500. At the exit of the fourth turn, his car veered sharply towards the entrance of pit road and back-ended the fence, only to careen across the pit lane and smash virtually head on at sizeable speed against the edge of pit wall; this second impact tore off the front of the car leaving Dismore's legs exposed. Among the injuries he suffered, the most severe was a broken neck.

Dismore was largely out of open wheel racing until the 1996 Indy 500 where he drove for Team Menard, though he did try to qualify in the 1992 Indianapolis 500 for Concept Motorsports in an outdated Lola/Buick. In 1997, he drove a second car at the Indy 500 for Kelley Racing and would become a full-time fixture there until the 2001 season. He returned to Menard for a partial season in 2002. He also represented the IRL in the International Race of Champions in 2000 and 2001.

Dismore currently owns and operates New Castle Motorsports Park, a Karting facility in New Castle, Indiana. its the home of the Dan Wheldon Memorial Pro-Am Karting Challenge, a fundraising event that is popular with racers, crews, sponsors and fans of IndyCar racing. The event returned in May 2019 after a nearly four-year hiatus. Dismore is also vice president of Comet Kart Sales in Greenfield, Indiana, the business was founded by his father and has been in family ownership ever since.

== Motorsports career results ==
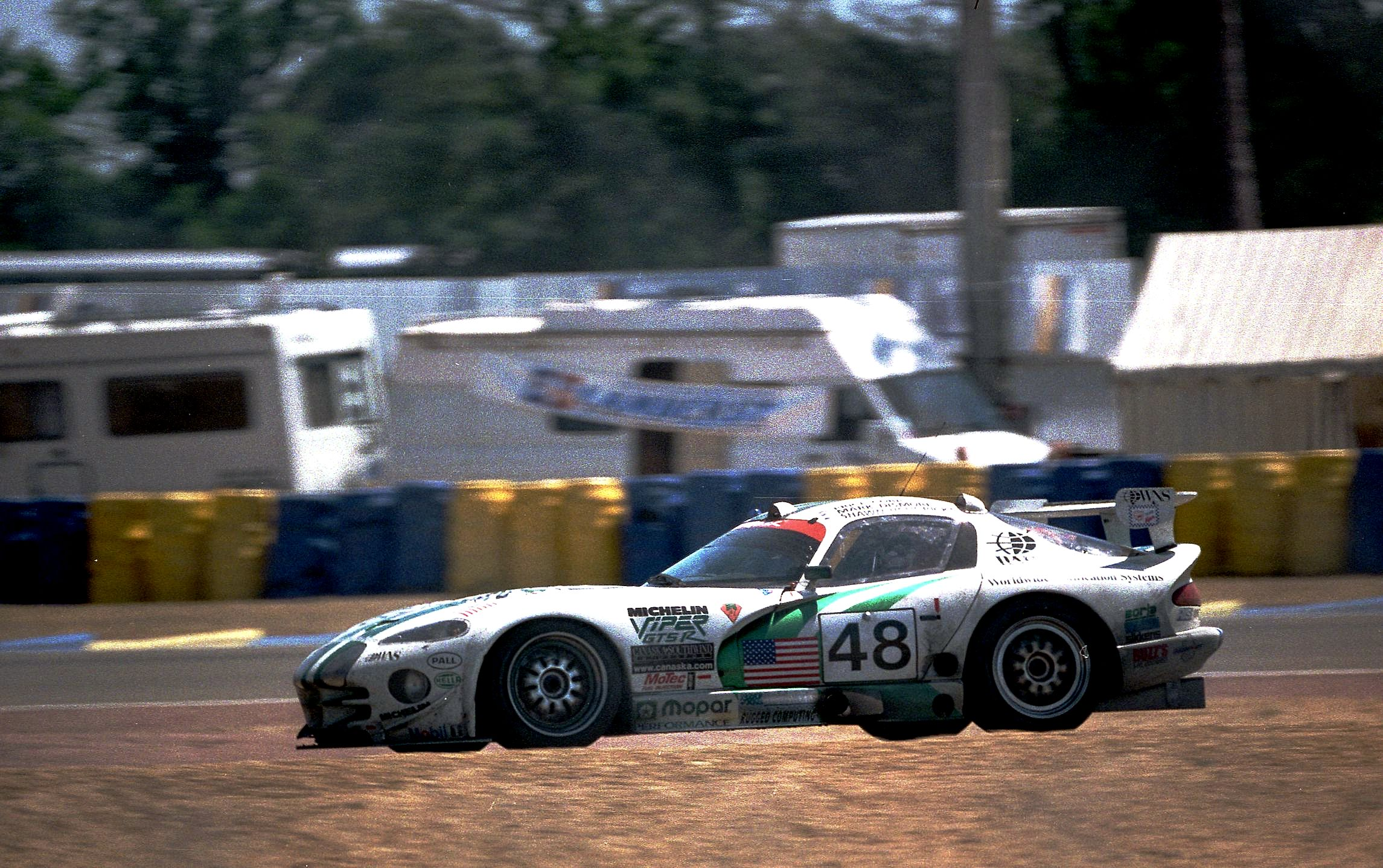
Dismore competing at the 1996 24 Hours of Le Mans

=== American Open-Wheel racing results ===
(key) (Races in bold indicate pole position) (Races in italics indicate fastest lap)

==== PPG IndyCar World Series ====
Year	Team	Chassis	Engine	1	2	3	4	5	6	7	8	9	10	11	12	13	14	15	16	17	Rank	Points	Ref
1989	Mann Motorsports	Lola T87/00	Buick 3300 V6t	PHX	LBH	INDY	MIL	DET	POR	CLE	MEA	TOR	MCH	POC	MDO; 24	ROA	NAZ	LAG			**49th**	**0**	
1991	Arciero Racing	Penske PC17	Buick 3300 V6t	SRF; 20	LBH; 21	PHX; 15	INDY; DNQ	MIL	DET	POR	CLE	MEA	TOR	MCH	DEN	VAN	MDO	ROA	NAZ	LAG	**39th**	**0**	
1992	Mann Motorsports	Lola T90/00	Buick 3300 V6t	SRF	PHX	LBH	INDY; DNQ	DET	POR	MIL	NHA	TOR	MCH	CLE	ROA	VAN	MDO	NAZ	LAG		NC	-	

==== Indy Lights ====
Year	Team	1	2	3	4	5	6	7	8	9	10	11	12	Rank	Points
1993	Team Leisy	PHX	LBH	MIL	DET	POR	CLE	TOR	NHA	VAN	MDO; 18	NAZ	LS; 9	**20th**	**4**

==== Indy Racing League ====
Year	Team	Chassis	No.	Engine	1	2	3	4	5	6	7	8	9	10	11	12	13	14	15	Rank	Points	Ref
1996	Team Menard	Lola T95/00	30	Menard V6t	WDW	PHX	INDY; 19													32nd	16	
1996-97	Team Menard	Lola T95/00	3	Menard V6t	NHA; 20	LVS; 17	WDW	PHX												17th	158	
1996-97	Kelley Racing-PDM	Dallara IR7	28	Oldsmobile Aurora V8					INDY; 28	TXS; 11	PPIR; 11	CLT; 19	NHA; 11	LVS; 5						17th	158	
1998	Kelley Racing	Dallara IR8	28	Oldsmobile Aurora V8	WDW; 5	PHX; 16	INDY; 27	TXS; 21	NHA; 8	DOV; 18	CLT; 15	PPR; 19	ATL; 7	TMS2; 10	LVS; 15					15th	180	
1999	Kelley Racing	Dallara IR9	28	Oldsmobile Aurora V8	WDW; 6	PHX; 7	CLT; C	INDY; 16	**TXS**; 8	PPIR; 21	ATL; 17	**DOV**; 15	PPR; 3	LVS; 20	TXS; 1					3rd	240	
2000	Kelley Racing	Dallara IR-00	28	Oldsmobile Aurora V8	WDW; 16	PHX; 16	**LVS**; 2	INDY; 11	TXS; 6	PPIR; 4	ATL; 18	KTY; 11	TXS; 14							5th	202	
2001	Kelley Racing	Dallara IR-01	28	Oldsmobile Aurora V8	PHX; 25	HMS; 7	ATL; 26	INDY; 16	**TXS**; 20	PPIR; 13	RIR; 6	KAN; 11	NSH; 16	KEN; 22	GAT; 2	CHI; 17	TXS; 23			14th	205	
2002	Sam Schmidt Motorsports	Dallara IR-02	99	Chevrolet Indy V8	HMS	PHX	FON	NAZ	INDY; 32	TXS										29th	73	
2002	Team Menard	Dallara IR-02	2	Chevrolet Indy V8							PPIR; 11	RIR; 11	KAN; 20	NSH; 18	MIS; 18	KTY	GAT	CHI	TXS	29th	73	

Years	Teams	Races	Poles	Wins	Podiums (Non-win)	Top 10s (Non-podium)	Indianapolis 500 Wins	Championships
7	3	58	4	1	3	11	0	0

==== Indianapolis 500 ====
Year	Chassis	Engine	Start	Finish	Team
1991	Penske PC17	Buick 3300 V6t	Practice Crash		Arciero Racing
1992	Lola T90/00	Buick 3300 V6t	DNQ		Mann Development
1996	Lola T95/00	Menard V6t	14	19	Team Menard
1997	Dallara IR7	Oldsmobile Aurora V8	25	28	Kelley Racing
1998	Dallara IR8	Oldsmobile Aurora V8	12	27	Kelley Racing
1999	Dallara IR9	Oldsmobile Aurora V8	5	16	Kelley Racing
2000	Dallara IR-00	Oldsmobile Aurora V8	11	11	Kelley Racing
2001	Dallara IR-01	Oldsmobile Aurora V8	4	16	Kelley Racing
2002	Dallara IR-02	Chevrolet Indy V8	33	32	Sam Schmidt Motorsports

=== International Race of Champions ===
(key) (Bold – Pole position. * – Most laps led.)

International Race of Champions results
Year	Make	1	2	3	4	Pos.	Points	Ref
2000	Pontiac	DAY; 12	TAL; 12	MCH; 10	IND; 11	12th	15	
2001	Pontiac	DAY; 8	TAL; 7	MCH; 11	IND; 9	11th	25	

=== 24 Hours of Le Mans results ===
Year	Team	Co-drivers	Car	Class	Laps	Pos.	Class pos.
1996	(United States) Canaska Southwind Motorsport	(United States) Price Cobb (United States) Shawn Hendricks	Chrysler Viper GTS-R	LMGT1	320	10th	8th

Sporting positions
Preceded by Hiro Matsushita	North American Formula Atlantic; Pacific Division Champion; 1990	Succeeded by Jovy Marcelo (Combined championship)
