= 2001 Indy Racing League =

American auto racing season

2001 Indy Racing League season
- Indy Racing Northern Light Series
- 2001 Indy Racing League

Season
- Races: 13
- Start date: March 18
- End date: October 6

Awards
- Drivers' champion: (United States) Sam Hornish Jr.
- Manufacturers' Cup: (United States) Oldsmobile
- Rookie of the Year: (Brazil) Felipe Giaffone
- Indianapolis 500 winner: (Brazil) Hélio Castroneves

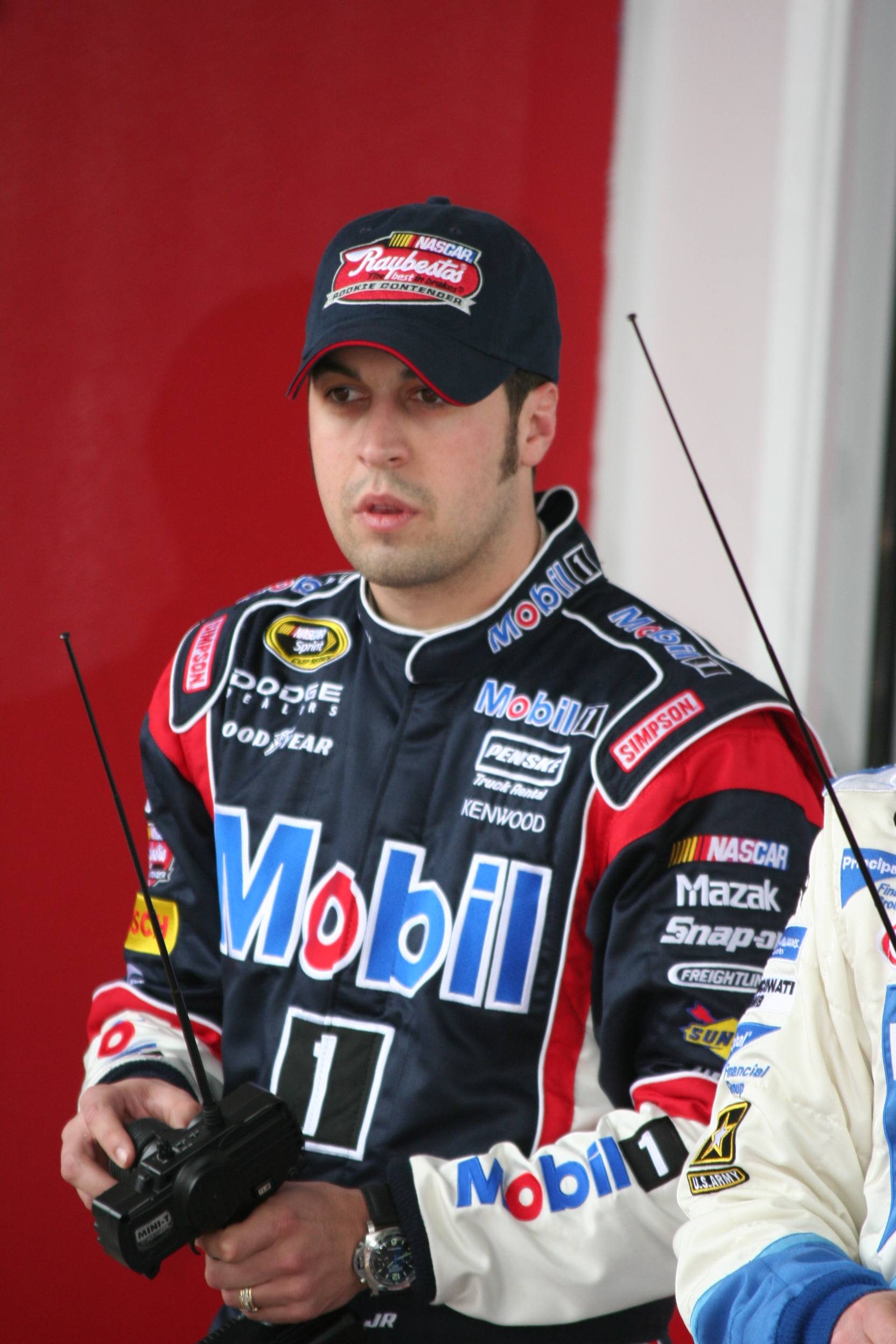
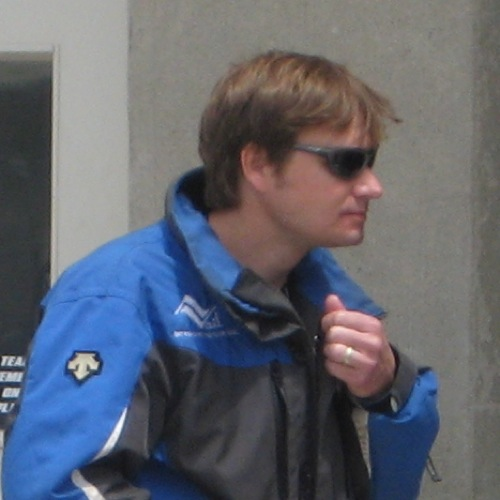
Sam Hornish Jr. (left) won his first Drivers' Championship while Buddy Lazier (right) finished second in the championship.

The 2001 Indy Racing Northern Light Series saw the addition of five races and loss of one to bring the total to 13. Chip Ganassi Racing returned to the Indy 500 with four cars and were joined on the grid by Penske Racing and Team Kool Green. Sam Hornish Jr. won 3 races on his way to the championship while the less consistent Buddy Lazier won four races on his way to second place in his title defense.

== Teams and drivers ==
All drivers and teams used Firestone Tires.

Team	Chassis	Engine	No.	Drivers	Round(s)
(United States) Team Menard	Dallara	Oldsmobile	2	(United States) Greg Ray	1–10
(United States) Team Menard	Dallara	Oldsmobile	2	(United States) Jaques Lazier	11–13
(United States) Galles Racing	G-Force	Oldsmobile	3	(United States) Al Unser Jr.	All
(United States) Galles Racing	G-Force	Oldsmobile	31	(United States) Casey Mears R	1–4
(United States) Galles Racing	G-Force	Oldsmobile	32	(France) Didier André R	All
(United States) Panther Racing	Dallara	Oldsmobile	4	(United States) Sam Hornish Jr.	All
(United States) Treadway-Hubbard Racing	G-Force	Oldsmobile	5	(Netherlands) Arie Luyendyk	4
(United States) Treadway-Hubbard Racing	G-Force	Oldsmobile	5	(United States) Rick Treadway R	10, 12–13
(United States) Treadway-Hubbard Racing	G-Force	Oldsmobile	21	(Brazil) Felipe Giaffone R	All
(United States) Tri-Star Motorsports	Dallara	Oldsmobile	6	(United States) Tyce Carlson	1
(United States) Tri-Star Motorsports	Dallara	Oldsmobile	6	(United States) Jon Herb R	2–4, 8
(United States) Tri-Star Motorsports	Dallara	Oldsmobile	6	(United States) Jeret Schroeder	5, 7
(United States) Tri-Star Motorsports	Dallara	Oldsmobile	60	(United States) Richie Hearn	4
(United States) Dick Simon Racing	Dallara	Oldsmobile	7	(France) Stéphan Grégoire	1–3
(United States) Dick Simon Racing	Dallara	Oldsmobile	17	(Colombia) Roberto Guerrero	4
(United States) Kelley Racing	Dallara	Oldsmobile	8	(United States) Scott Sharp	All
(United States) Kelley Racing	Dallara	Oldsmobile	28	(United States) Mark Dismore	All
(United States) PDM Racing	G-Force	Oldsmobile	9	(United States) Jeret Schroeder	1–4, 8
(United States) PDM Racing	G-Force	Oldsmobile	18	(United States) Jon Herb R	12–13
(United States) Cahill Racing	Dallara	Oldsmobile	10	(United States) Robby McGehee	1–5, 8–13
(United States) Cahill Racing	Dallara	Oldsmobile	11	(United States) Dr. Jack Miller	3
(United States) A. J. Foyt Enterprises	Dallara	Oldsmobile	11	(United States) Donnie Beechler	4–12
(United States) A. J. Foyt Enterprises	Dallara	Oldsmobile	11	(United States) Greg Ray	13
(United States) A. J. Foyt Enterprises	Dallara	Oldsmobile	14	(Chile) Eliseo Salazar	All
(United States) A. J. Foyt Enterprises	Dallara	Oldsmobile	41	(United States) Robby Gordon	4
(United States) Bradley Motorsports	Dallara	Oldsmobile	12	(United States) Buzz Calkins	All
(United States) Walker Racing	Dallara	Oldsmobile	15	(United States) Sarah Fisher	All
(United States) Indy Regency Racing	G-Force	Oldsmobile	16	(United States) Cory Witherill R	3–4
(United States) Dreyer & Reinbold Racing	G-Force	Infiniti	24	(United States) Robbie Buhl	All
(United States) Blueprint Racing	G-Force	Oldsmobile	27	(United States) John Hollansworth Jr.	2
(United States) Blueprint Racing	G-Force	Oldsmobile	27	(United States) Jim Guthrie	4
(United States) McCormack Motorsports	G-Force	Oldsmobile	30	(United States) Brandon Erwin R	1–3, 5
(United States) McCormack Motorsports	G-Force	Oldsmobile	30	(United States) Jimmy Kite	4
(United States) Chip Ganassi Racing	G-Force	Oldsmobile	33	(United States) Tony Stewart	4
(United States) Chip Ganassi Racing	G-Force	Oldsmobile	44	(United States) Jimmy Vasser	4
(United States) Chip Ganassi Racing	G-Force	Oldsmobile	49	(France) Nicolas Minassian	4
(United States) Chip Ganassi Racing	G-Force	Oldsmobile	50	(Brazil) Bruno Junqueira	4
(United States) Conquest Racing	Dallara	Infiniti	34	(France) Laurent Redon	12–13
(United States) Heritage Motorsports	G-Force	Oldsmobile	35	(United States) Jeff Ward	1–7, 9–13
(United States) Heritage Motorsports	G-Force	Oldsmobile	36	(France) Stéphan Grégoire	4
(United States) Brayton Racing	Dallara	Oldsmobile	37	(United States) Steve Knapp	4
(United States) Brayton Racing	Dallara	Oldsmobile	61	(United States) Memo Gidley	4
(United States) Team Green	Dallara	Oldsmobile	39	(United States) Michael Andretti	4
(United States) Sam Schmidt Motorsports	Dallara	Oldsmobile	44	(United States) Anthony Lazzaro R	11, 13
(United States) Sam Schmidt Motorsports	Dallara	Oldsmobile	99	(United States) Davey Hamilton	1–5
(United States) Sam Schmidt Motorsports	Dallara	Oldsmobile	99	(United States) Richie Hearn	6, 12
(United States) Sam Schmidt Motorsports	Dallara	Oldsmobile	99	(United States) Jaques Lazier	7–10
(United States) Sam Schmidt Motorsports	Dallara	Oldsmobile	99	(United States) Alex Barron	11
(United States) Team Cheever	Dallara	Infiniti	51	(United States) Eddie Cheever	All
(United States) Team Cheever	Dallara	Infiniti	52	(Canada) Scott Goodyear	4
(United States) Vertex-Cunningham Racing	Dallara	Oldsmobile	55	(Japan) Shigeaki Hattori	All
(United States) Team Penske	Dallara	Oldsmobile	66	(Brazil) Gil de Ferran	1, 4
(United States) Team Penske	Dallara	Oldsmobile	68	(Brazil) Hélio Castroneves	1, 4
(United States) Team Xtreme	G-Force	Oldsmobile	77	(United States) Jaques Lazier	4–6
(United States) Team Xtreme	G-Force	Oldsmobile	88	(Brazil) Airton Daré	All
(United States) Zali Racing	G-Force	Oldsmobile	81	(United States) John Paul Jr.	4
(United States) Zali Racing	G-Force	Oldsmobile	81	(United States) Billy Roe	5–13
(United States) Hemelgarn Racing	Dallara	Oldsmobile	91	(United States) Buddy Lazier	All
(United States) Hemelgarn Racing	Dallara	Oldsmobile	92	(United States) Stan Wattles	1–3
(United States) Hemelgarn Racing	Dallara	Oldsmobile	92	(United States) Chris Menninga R	11–13
(United States) Hemelgarn Racing	Dallara	Oldsmobile	93	(United States) Steve Knapp	4
(United States) Curb-Agajanian-Beck Motorsports	Dallara	Oldsmobile	98	(United States) Billy Boat	All

== Schedule ==
Rnd	Date	Race Name	Track	Location
1	March 18	Pennzoil Copper World Indy 200	Phoenix International Raceway	Phoenix, Arizona
2	April 8	Infiniti Grand Prix of Miami	Homestead-Miami Speedway	Homestead, Florida
3	April 28	zMax 500	Atlanta Motor Speedway	Hampton, Georgia
4	May 27	85th Indianapolis 500	Indianapolis Motor Speedway	Speedway, Indiana
5	June 9	Casino Magic 500	Texas Motor Speedway	Fort Worth, Texas
6	June 17	Radisson Indy 200	Pikes Peak International Raceway	Fountain, Colorado
7	June 30	SunTrust Indy Challenge	Richmond International Raceway	Richmond, Virginia
8	July 8	Ameristar Casino Indy 200	Kansas Speedway	Kansas City, Kansas
9	July 21	Harrah's 200	Nashville Superspeedway	Lebanon, Tennessee
10	August 12	Belterra Resort Indy 300	Kentucky Speedway	Sparta, Kentucky
11	August 26	Gateway Indy 250	Gateway International Raceway	Madison, Illinois
12	September 2	Delphi Indy 300	Chicagoland Speedway	Joliet, Illinois
13	October 6*	Chevy 500	Texas Motor Speedway	Fort Worth, Texas
Sources:

- This race was originally scheduled for September 16 but was postponed in the aftermath of the September 11th attacks.

== Results ==
Rd.	Race	Pole position	Fastest lap	Most laps led	Race winner			
Rd.	Race	Pole position	Fastest lap	Most laps led	Winner	Team	Chassis	Engine
1	Phoenix	(United States) Greg Ray	(United States) Billy Boat	(United States) Sam Hornish Jr.	(United States) Sam Hornish Jr.	Panther Racing	Dallara	Oldsmobile
2	Homestead	(United States) Jeff Ward	(United States) Sam Hornish Jr.	(United States) Sam Hornish Jr.	(United States) Sam Hornish Jr.	Panther Racing	Dallara	Oldsmobile
3	Atlanta	(United States) Greg Ray	(United States) Greg Ray	(United States) Greg Ray	(United States) Greg Ray	Team Menard	Dallara	Oldsmobile
4	Indianapolis	(United States) Scott Sharp	(United States) Sam Hornish Jr.	(Brazil) Hélio Castroneves	(Brazil) Hélio Castroneves	Team Penske	Dallara	Oldsmobile
5	Texas 1	(United States) Mark Dismore	(United States) Eddie Cheever	(United States) Greg Ray	(United States) Scott Sharp	Kelley Racing	Dallara	Oldsmobile
6	Pikes Peak	(United States) Greg Ray	(United States) Billy Boat	(United States) Sam Hornish Jr.	(United States) Buddy Lazier	Hemelgarn Racing	Dallara	Oldsmobile
7	Richmond	(United States) Jaques Lazier	(United States) Buddy Lazier	(United States) Buddy Lazier	(United States) Buddy Lazier	Hemelgarn Racing	Dallara	Oldsmobile
8	Kansas	(United States) Scott Sharp	(United States) Mark Dismore	(United States) Eddie Cheever	(United States) Eddie Cheever	Team Cheever	Dallara	Infiniti
9	Nashville	(United States) Greg Ray	(United States) Buddy Lazier	(United States) Sam Hornish Jr.	(United States) Buddy Lazier	Hemelgarn Racing	Dallara	Oldsmobile
10	Kentucky	(United States) Scott Sharp	(United States) Mark Dismore	(United States) Scott Sharp	(United States) Buddy Lazier	Hemelgarn Racing	Dallara	Oldsmobile
11	Gateway	(United States) Sam Hornish Jr.	(United States) Robbie Buhl	(United States) Sam Hornish Jr.	(United States) Al Unser Jr.	Galles Racing	G-Force	Oldsmobile
12	Chicagoland	(United States) Jaques Lazier	(United States) Robbie Buhl	(United States) Jaques Lazier	(United States) Jaques Lazier	Team Menard	Dallara	Oldsmobile
13	Texas 2	(United States) Sam Hornish Jr.	(Brazil) Felipe Giaffone	(United States) Sam Hornish Jr.	(United States) Sam Hornish Jr.	Panther Racing	Dallara	Oldsmobile

Note: All races running on Oval/Speedway.

== Race summaries ==
=== Pennzoil Copper World Indy 200 ===
This race was held March 18 at Phoenix International Raceway. Greg Ray won the pole.

Top ten results

1. 4- Sam Hornish Jr.
2. 14- Eliseo Salazar
3. 91- Buddy Lazier
4. 8- Scott Sharp
5. 98- Billy Boat
6. 21- Felipe Giaffone
7. 35- Jeff Ward
8. 10- Robby McGehee
9. 12- Buzz Calkins
10. 88- Airton Daré

=== Inaugural Infiniti Grand Prix of Miami ===
This race was held April 8 at Homestead-Miami Speedway. Jeff Ward won the pole.

Top ten results

1. 4- Sam Hornish Jr.
2. 15- Sarah Fisher
3. 14- Eliseo Salazar
4. 21- Felipe Giaffone
5. 35- Jeff Ward
6. 3- Al Unser Jr.
7. 28- Mark Dismore
8. 8- Scott Sharp
9. 51- Eddie Cheever
10. 32- Didier André
- Sarah Fisher's second place was the highest finish in an Indy car race by a female driver at the time.

=== zMax 500 ===
This race was held April 28 at Atlanta Motor Speedway. Greg Ray won the pole.

Top ten results

1. 2- Greg Ray
2. 8- Scott Sharp
3. 12- Buzz Calkins
4. 4- Sam Hornish Jr.
5. 14- Eliseo Salazar
6. 91- Buddy Lazier
7. 35- Jeff Ward
8. 55- Shigeaki Hattori
9. 88- Airton Daré
10. 21- Felipe Giaffone
- A huge 11-car pileup occurred on lap 54, sending Dr. Jack Miller to the hospital with a concussion. It would be Miller's final race.
- This was the final Indy car race held at Atlanta to-date.
- Fifth and final career win for Greg Ray.

=== 85th Indianapolis 500 ===
The 85th running of the Indianapolis 500 was held May 27 at Indianapolis Motor Speedway. Scott Sharp sat on pole.

Top ten results

1. 68- Hélio Castroneves
2. 66- Gil de Ferran
3. 39- Michael Andretti
4. 44- Jimmy Vasser
5. 50- Bruno Junqueira
6. 33- Tony Stewart
7. 14- Eliseo Salazar
8. 88- Airton Daré
9. 98- Billy Boat
10. 21- Felipe Giaffone
- Polesitter Sharp crashed on the opening lap, and finished last.
- Team Penske returned to Indy after failing to qualify in 1995 and boycotting the race due to the IRL/CART "split" from 1996 to 2000. Penske finished 1st–2nd with Hélio Castroneves and Gil de Ferran, Roger Penske's first-ever 1–2 at Indy as an owner.
- Second straight 500 victory for a race rookie.

=== Casino Magic 500 ===
This race was held June 9 at Texas Motor Speedway. Mark Dismore won the pole.

Top ten results

1. 8- Scott Sharp
2. 21- Felipe Giaffone
3. 4- Sam Hornish Jr.
4. 91- Buddy Lazier
5. 98- Billy Boat
6. 11- Donnie Beechler
7. 14- Eliseo Salazar
8. 3- Al Unser Jr.
9. 77- Jaques Lazier
10. 55- Shigeaki Hattori
- A serious crash on lap 72 involved Davey Hamilton, who lost control after Jeret Schroeder blew an engine, and Hamilton drove in the oil. Hamilton then crashed hard into the turn 2 wall, causing serious injuries to both legs and feet. The crash effectively ended Hamilton's full-time racing career.
- Scott Sharp stole the win after Eddie Cheever and Greg Ray crashed hard on the backstretch while battling for the victory in the final laps. Robby McGehee, who was running many laps down, was also caught up in the mishap; McGehee suffered leg and head injuries and missed several races.

=== Radisson Indy 200 ===
This race was held June 17 at Pikes Peak International Raceway. Greg Ray won the pole.

Top ten results

1. 91- Buddy Lazier
2. 4- Sam Hornish Jr.
3. 24- Robbie Buhl
4. 98- Billy Boat
5. 88- Airton Daré
6. 51- Eddie Cheever
7. 21- Felipe Giaffone
8. 8- Scott Sharp
9. 99- Richie Hearn
10. 15- Sarah Fisher

=== Inaugural SunTrust Indy Challenge ===
This race was held June 30 at Richmond International Raceway. Jaques Lazier won the pole.

Top ten results

1. 91- Buddy Lazier
2. 4- Sam Hornish Jr.
3. 3- Al Unser Jr.
4. 32- Didier André
5. 8- Scott Sharp
6. 28- Mark Dismore
7. 11- Donnie Beechler
8. 35- Jeff Ward
9. 24- Robbie Buhl
10. 12- Buzz Calkins

=== Ameristar Casino Indy 200 ===
This race was held July 8 at Kansas Speedway. Scott Sharp won the pole.

Top ten results

1. 51- Eddie Cheever*
2. 4- Sam Hornish Jr.
3. 11- Donnie Beechler
4. 21- Felipe Giaffone
5. 91- Buddy Lazier
6. 88- Airton Daré
7. 14- Eliseo Salazar
8. 55- Shigeaki Hattori
9. 98- Billy Boat
10. 10- Robby McGehee
- Final career win for Eddie Cheever.

=== Inaugural Harrah's 200 ===
This race was held July 21 at Nashville Superspeedway. Greg Ray won the pole.

Top ten results

1. 91- Buddy Lazier
2. 98- Billy Boat
3. 99- Jaques Lazier
4. 10- Robby McGehee
5. 8- Scott Sharp
6. 4- Sam Hornish Jr.
7. 55- Shigeaki Hattori
8. 21- Felipe Giaffone
9. 12- Buzz Calkins
10. 11- Donnie Beechler*
- On lap 103 of the race, Cheever was attempting to lap the slower car of Greg Ray, when the two made contact in turn 2. The resulting accident also caught up Unser Jr., Beechler, and Dismore, who was struck from behind by a charging Airton Dare. No one was injured in the crash. This was the first caution of the race and lasted 18 laps, with Buddy Lazier in the lead as racing resumed. He would go on to win.
- Second and final career top ten finish for Donnie Beechler.

=== Belterra Resort Indy 300 ===
This race was held August 12 at Kentucky Speedway. Scott Sharp won the pole.

Top ten results

1. 91- Buddy Lazier
2. 8- Scott Sharp
3. 4- Sam Hornish Jr.
4. 3- Al Unser Jr.
5. 11- Donnie Beechler
6. 98- Billy Boat
7. 55- Shigeaki Hattori
8. 21- Felipe Giaffone
9. 24- Robbie Buhl
10. 35- Jeff Ward
- Final career win for Buddy Lazier.
- This race was Greg Rays last for Team Menard. He would part ways with the team after finishing 3 laps down to the winner in 13th.

=== Inaugural Gateway Indy 250 ===
This race was held August 26 at Gateway International Raceway. Sam Hornish Jr. won the pole.

Top ten results

1. 3- Al Unser Jr.
2. 28- Mark Dismore
3. 4- Sam Hornish Jr.
4. 51- Eddie Cheever
5. 24- Robbie Buhl
6. 98- Billy Boat
7. 35- Jeff Ward
8. 8- Scott Sharp
9. 88- Airton Daré
10. 10- Robby McGehee
- Penultimate career win for Al Unser Jr.

=== Inaugural Delphi Indy 300 ===
This race was held September 2 at Chicagoland Speedway. Jaques Lazier won the pole.

Top ten results

1. 2- Jaques Lazier
2. 4- Sam Hornish Jr.
3. 51- Eddie Cheever
4. 35- Jeff Ward
5. 11- Donnie Beechler
6. 99- Richie Hearn
7. 34- Laurent Redon
8. 3- Al Unser Jr.
9. 12- Buzz Calkins
10. 21- Felipe Giaffone
- This was Jaques Laziers only IndyCar win. It was his second start for the Menard team after taking over the car previously driven by Greg Ray.

=== Chevy 500 ===
This race was originally scheduled for September 16 at Texas Motor Speedway but was postponed in the aftermath of the September 11th attacks. The race was eventually held October 6. Sam Hornish Jr. won the pole.

Top ten results

1. 4- Sam Hornish Jr.
2. 8- Scott Sharp
3. 24- Robbie Buhl
4. 14- Eliseo Salazar
5. 5- Rick Treadway
6. 3- Al Unser Jr.
7. 88- Airton Daré
8. 11- Greg Ray
9. 18- Jon Herb
10. 12- Buzz Calkins
- Only career top five finish for Rick Treadway. Also his best finish ever.
- Greg Rays first race back after losing his Team Menard ride. He drove for A.J. Foyts team in this race.
- Final career start for Buzz Calkins. Also his final top ten finish.
- Only career top ten finish for Jon Herb. Also his best ever finish.

== Points standings ==
Pos	Driver	PHX	HOM	ATL	INDY	TMS1	PPR	RIC	KAN	NSS	KEN	GTW	CHI	TMS2	Pts
1	(United States) Sam Hornish Jr.	1*	1*	4	14	3	2*	2	2	6*	3	**3***	2	**1***	503
2	(United States) Buddy Lazier	3	20	6	18	4	1	1*	5	1	1	13	11	17	398
3	(United States) Scott Sharp	4	8	2	**33**	1	8	5	**17**	5	**2***	8	25	2	355
4	(United States) Billy Boat	5	13	14	9	5	4	18	9	2	6	6	12	12	313
5	(Chile) Eliseo Salazar	2	3	5	7	7	14	12	7	11	15	17	18	4	308
6	(Brazil) Felipe Giaffone RY	6	4	10	10	2	7	11	4	8	8	20	10	21	304
7	(United States) Al Unser Jr.	23	6	17	30	8	11	3	20	14	4	1	8	6	287
8	(United States) Eddie Cheever	19	9	24	26	12	6	13	1*	15	21	4	3	18	261
9	(United States) Buzz Calkins	9	16	3	12	15	15	10	13	9	16	22	9	10	242
10	(Brazil) Airton Daré	10	23	9	8	19	5	15	6	17	20	9	19	7	239
11	(United States) Jeff Ward	7	**5**	7	24	16	12	8		20	10	7	4	24	238
12	(United States) Robbie Buhl	11	24	20	15	21	3	9	21	13	9	5	22	3	237
13	(Japan) Shigeaki Hattori	13	15	8	DNQ	10	DNS	14	8	7	7	15	21	16	215
14	(United States) Mark Dismore	25	7	26	16	**20**	13	6	11	16	22	2	17	23	205
15	(United States) Donnie Beechler				25	6	16	7	3	10	5	14	5		204
16	(United States) Robby McGehee	8	12	21	11	14			10	4	18	10	20	14	196
17	(United States) Jaques Lazier				22	9	17	**19**	18	3	12	16	**1***	20	195
18	(United States) Greg Ray	**22**	21	**1***	17	11*	**18**	Wth	14	**18**	13			8	193
19	(United States) Sarah Fisher	17	2	11	31	18	10	17	12	19	19	11	24	25	188
20	(France) Didier André R	27	10	13	DNQ	17	19	4	16	21	11	12	13	15	188
21	(United States) Billy Roe					13	20	20	22	12	14	23	23	22	101
22	(United States) Jeret Schroeder	26	14	19	20	23		16	15						77
23	(United States) Jon Herb R		25	16	27				19				15	9	70
24	(Brazil) Hélio Castroneves	18			1*										64
25	(United States) Rick Treadway R										17		14	5	59
26	(United States) Davey Hamilton	12	19	18	23	24									54
27	(United States) Richie Hearn				DNQ		9						6		50
28	(Brazil) Gil de Ferran	24			2										46
29	(France) Laurent Redon R												7	11	45
30	(United States) Brandon Erwin R	14	17	27	Wth	22									40
31	(United States) Casey Mears R	20	11	23	DNQ										36
32	(United States) Stan Wattles	16	26	12	Wth										36
33	(United States) Chris Menninga R											19	16	19	36
34	(United States) Michael Andretti				3										35
35	(France) Stéphan Grégoire	21	22	15	28										34
36	(United States) Jimmy Vasser				4										32
37	(Brazil) Bruno Junqueira				5										30
38	(United States) Anthony Lazzaro R											18		13	29
39	(United States) Tony Stewart				6										28
40	(United States) Cory Witherill R			22	19										19
41	(Netherlands) Arie Luyendyk				13										17
42	(United States) Tyce Carlson	15			Wth										15
43	(United States) John Hollansworth Jr.		18												12
44	(United States) Alex Barron											21			9
45	(United States) Robby Gordon				21										9
46	(United States) Dr. Jack Miller			25											5
47	(France) Nicolas Minassian				29										1
48	(Canada) Scott Goodyear				32										1
–	(Brazil) Raul Boesel				Wth										0
–	(United States) Memo Gidley				DNQ										0
–	(Colombia) Roberto Guerrero				DNQ										0
–	(United States) Jim Guthrie				DNQ										0
–	(United States) Jimmy Kite				DNQ										0
–	(United States) Steve Knapp				DNQ										0
–	(United States) John Paul Jr.				DNQ										0
Pos	Driver	PHX	HOM	ATL	INDY	TMS1	PPR	RIC	KAN	NSS	KEN	GTW	CHI	TMS2	Pts

Color	Result
Gold	Winner
Silver	2nd place
Bronze	3rd place
Green	4th & 5th place
Light Blue	6th–10th place
Dark Blue	Finished (Outside Top 10)
Purple	Did not finish (Ret)
Red	Did not qualify (DNQ)
Brown	Withdrawn (Wth)
Black	Disqualified (DSQ)
White	Did not start (DNS)
Blank	Did not participate (DNP)
Blank	Not competing

**In-line notation**
**Bold**	Pole position (2 points)
Italics	Ran fastest race lap
*	Led most race laps (1 point)
DNS	Any driver who qualifies but does not start (DNS), earns all the points had they taken part.
RY	Rookie of the Year
R	Rookie

- Ties in points broken by number of wins, followed by number of 2nds, 3rds, etc., and then by number of pole positions, followed by number of times qualified 2nd, etc.

== See also ==
- 2001 Indianapolis 500
- 2001 Indy Lights season
- 2001 CART season
- 2001 Toyota Atlantic Championship season
- http://www.champcarstats.com/year/2001i.htm
- http://media.indycar.com/pdf/2011/IICS_2011_Historical_Record_Book_INT6.pdf (p. 125–126)

== Bibliography ==
- Johnson, Paul, ed. (2002). Indy Review 2001, Volume 11: Complete Coverage of the 2001 Indy Racing League Season. St. Paul, MN: Motorbooks International / MBI Publishing. ISBN 978-0-7603-1320-6.
