= Robby McGehee =

American racing driver

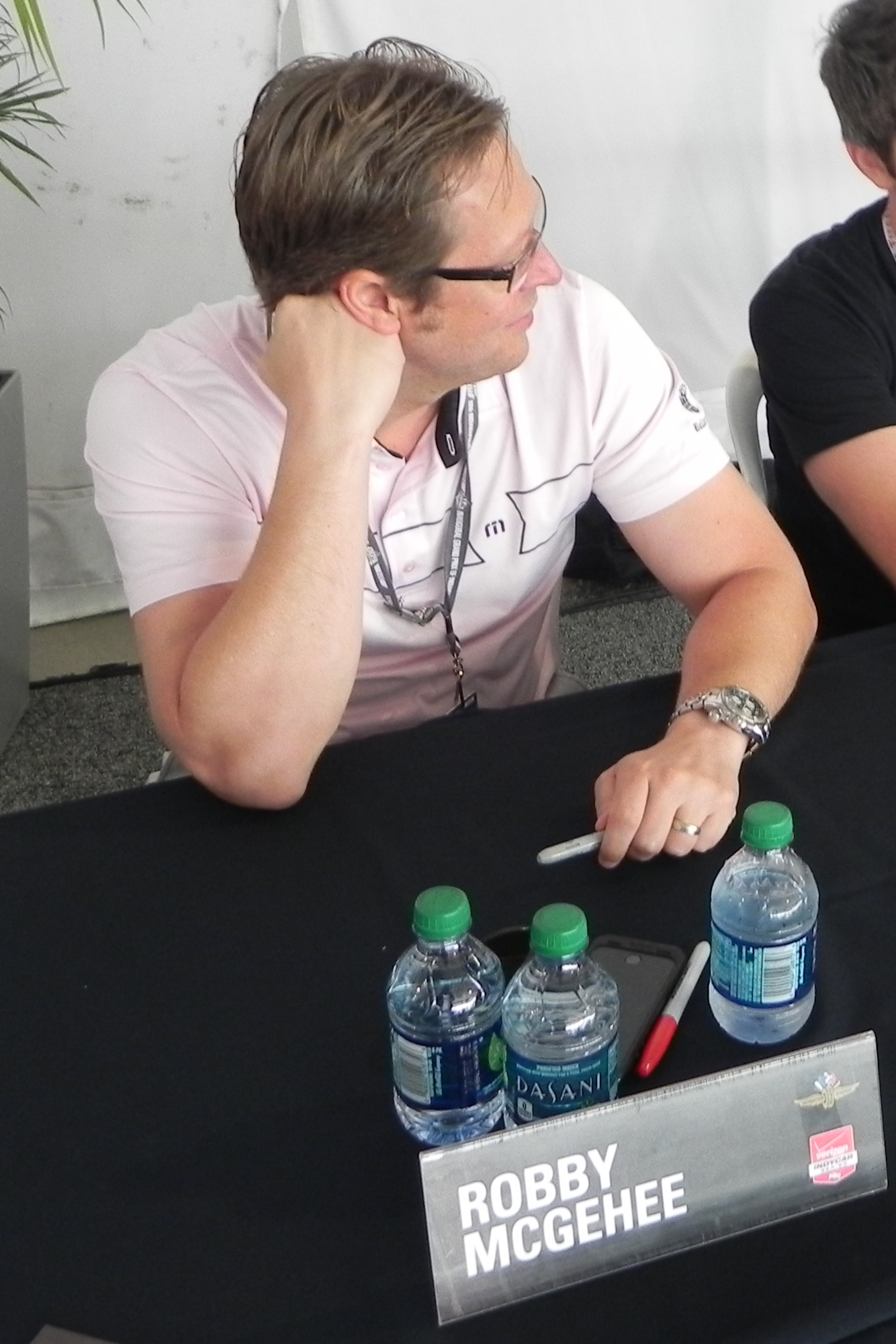
- McGehee in 2014
- Nationality: (United States) American
- Born: July 20, 1973 (age 53) St. Louis, Missouri, U.S.
- Retired: 2004

Indy Racing League IndyCar Series
- Years active: 1999-2004
- Teams: Conti Racing; Treadway Racing; Cahill Racing; Beck Motorsports; Cheever Racing; Panther Racing; PDM Racing
- Starts: 38
- Wins: 0
- Poles: 0
- Best finish: 12th in 2000

Awards
- 1999: Indianapolis 500 Rookie of the Year

Robby McGehee (born July 20, 1973) is an American former race car driver. He competed in the Indy Racing League and won the Indianapolis 500 Rookie of the Year award in 1999 after finishing fifth. He then raced for veteran owner Fred Treadway the next few seasons. By 2002, Treadway's team had closed and McGehee bounced around several teams and last raced in the Indianapolis 500 for PDM Racing in 2004.

McGehee got started in racing in 1994 when he went to Skip Barber Racing School with his mother. McGehee finished second in the Formula 2000 series Road to Indy Oval Crown series, including wins at Homestead-Miami Speedway and Atlanta Motor Speedway in 1998.

The 1999 VisionAire 500K at Charlotte was the first IndyCar race he qualified for, starting thirteenth. The race however, was cancelled after 79 laps due to spectator fatalities and struck from the record. McGehee was running ninth when the race was stopped. Later that month, the 1999 Indianapolis 500 would be his first official start in the IRL. He finished fifth in that race. Later that week, Robby presented his Rookie of the Year trophy to team mechanic Steve Fried, who was severely injured in a pit lane accident during the race, while he was in the hospital.

In 2004, McGehee was to have a fully sponsored effort, but the deal fell through weeks before the race. He was able to get backing from a St. Louis business (his hometown) and eventually Burger King. In order to qualify, he had to sweat out a possible qualification effort by Tony Stewart that never came to pass.

== Racing record ==
=== American open–wheel racing results ===
(key)

==== IndyCar Series ====
Year	Team	1	2	3	4	5	6	7	8	9	10	11	12	13	14	15	16	Rank	Points	Ref
1999	Conti Racing	WDW	PHX	CLT; C	INDY; 5	TXS; 19	PPI; DNS	ATL; 14	DOV; 9	PP2; 7	LVS; 6	TX2; 12						16th	156	
2000	Treadway Racing	WDW; 10	PHX; 24	LVS; 6	INDY; 21	TXS; 2	PPI; 13	ATL; 4	KTY; 14	TX2; 24								12th	174	
2001	Cahill Racing	PHX; 8	HMS; 12	ATL; 21	INDY; 11	TXS; 14	PPI	RIR	KAN; 10	NSH; 4	KTY; 18	STL; 10	CHI; 20	TX2; 14				16th	196	
2002	Cahill Racing	HMS; 14	PHX; 21	FON; 17	NZR; 13	INDY; DNQ	TXS											21st	142	
2002	CURB/Agajanian/Beck Motorsports							PPI; 17	RIR; 9	KAN; 13	NSH	MIS	KTY					21st	142	
2002	Treadway Racing													STL; 12	CHI			21st	142	
2002	Red Bull Cheever Racing															TX2; 13		21st	142	
2003	Panther Racing	HMS	PHX	MOT	INDY; 25	TXS	PPI	RIR	KAN	NSH	MIS	STL	KTY	NZR	CHI	FON	TX2	35th	5	
2004	PDM Racing	HMS	PHX	MOT	INDY; 22	TXS	RIR	KAN	NSH	MIL	MIS	KTY	PPI	NZR	CHI	FON	TX2	32nd	12	

==== Indianapolis 500 ====
Year	Chassis	Engine	Start	Finish	Team
1999	Dallara	Oldsmobile	27	5	Conti Racing
2000	G-Force	Oldsmobile	12	21	Treadway Racing
2001	Dallara	Oldsmobile	14	11	Cahill Racing
2002	Dallara	Chevrolet	DNQ		Cahill Racing
2003	Dallara	Chevrolet	31	25	Panther Racing
2004	Dallara	Chevrolet	33	22	PDM Racing

Sporting positions
Preceded by Steve Knapp	Indianapolis 500; Rookie of the Year; 1999	Succeeded by Juan Pablo Montoya
