= Donnie Beechler =

American racing driver (born 1961)

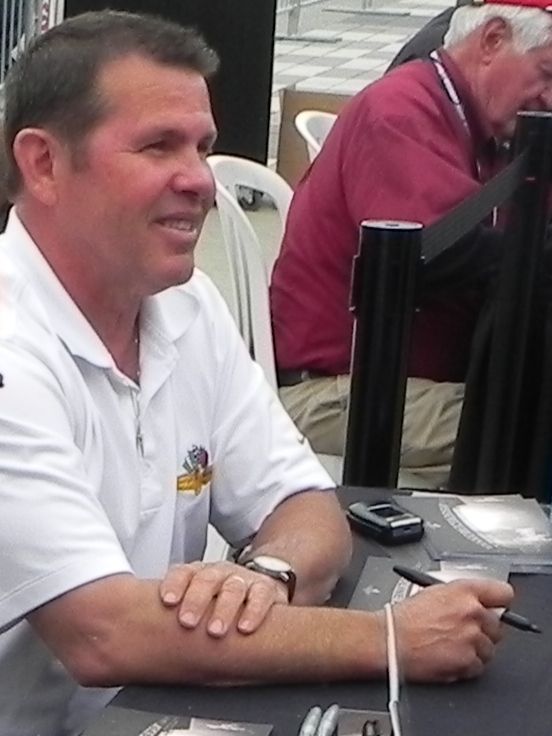
- Beechler in 2013
- Born: May 18, 1961 (age 65) Springfield, Illinois, U.S.
- Retired: 2002

IRL IndyCar Series
- Years active: 1998-2002
- Teams: Cahill Racing; A. J. Foyt Enterprises
- Starts: 36
- Wins: 0
- Poles: 0
- Fastest laps: 0
- Best finish: 3rd in 2000

Donnie Beechler (born May 18, 1961) is an American former driver in the Indy Racing League. He was born in Springfield, Illinois.

Beechler raced in the 1998–2001 seasons with 36 career starts, including four Indianapolis 500 showings. His best career finish was third, achieved twice, at the 2000 IRL Phoenix 200 won by Buddy Lazier at Phoenix International Raceway and the 2001 300-mile race won by Eddie Cheever, Jr. at Kansas Speedway.

Beechler won the 9th Annual Chili Bowl Nationals in 1995.

Since leaving IndyCar, Beechler he has returned to the USAC Silver Crown Series on a part-time basis.

Beechler was an avid roller skater competing in several Illinois State Speed Meets.

== Racing record ==
=== American Open Wheel ===
(key)

==== IndyCar results ====
Year	Team	1	2	3	4	5	6	7	8	9	10	11	12	13	Rank	Points	Ref
1998	Cahill Auto Racing	WDW	PHX	INDY; 32	TXS; 27	NHM; 20	DOV	CLT; 19	PPIR; 10	ATL; 22	TX2; 19	LVS; 23			28th	71	
1999	Cahill Racing	WDW; 26	PHX; 11	CLT; C^{1}	INDY; 29	TXS; 17	PPIR; 22	ATL; 8	DOV; 10	PPI2; 20	LVS; 18	TX2; 11			21st	130	
2000	Cahill Racing	WDW; 6	PHX; 3	LVS; 26	INDY; 12	TXS; 22	PPIR; 5	ATL; 5	KTY; 10	TX2; 6					6th	202	
2001	A. J. Foyt Enterprises	PHX	HMS	ATL	INDY; 25	TXS; 6	PPI; 16	RIR; 7	KAN; 3	NSH; 10	KTY; 5	STL; 14	CHI; 5	TX2	15th	204	
2002	A. J. Foyt Enterprises	HMS; DNS				INDY; DNQ									NC	-	

^{1} The 1999 VisionAire 500K at Charlotte was cancelled after 79 laps due to spectator fatalities.

==== Indy 500 results ====
Year	Chassis	Engine	Start	Finish	Team
1998	G-Force	Oldsmobile	24th	32nd	Cahill
1999	Dallara	Oldsmobile	19th	29th	Cahill
2000	Dallara	Oldsmobile	15th	12th	Cahill
2001	Dallara	Oldsmobile	27th	25th	Foyt
2002	Dallara	Chevrolet	Failed to Qualify		Foyt
