= Treadway Racing =

Former auto racing team

Treadway Racing is a former auto racing team that competed in the early seasons of the Indy Racing League IndyCar Series. The team was owned by Indianapolis business man Fred Treadway. Prior to the IRL's inaugural season in 1996, Treadway was able to sign former Indianapolis 500 Champion Arie Luyendyk to drive for his freshman team. Additionally, two long time backers of IndyCar teams, Bryant Heating & Cooling Systems and Jonathan Byrd's Cafeteria, were secured as sponsors.

== 1996 racing season ==
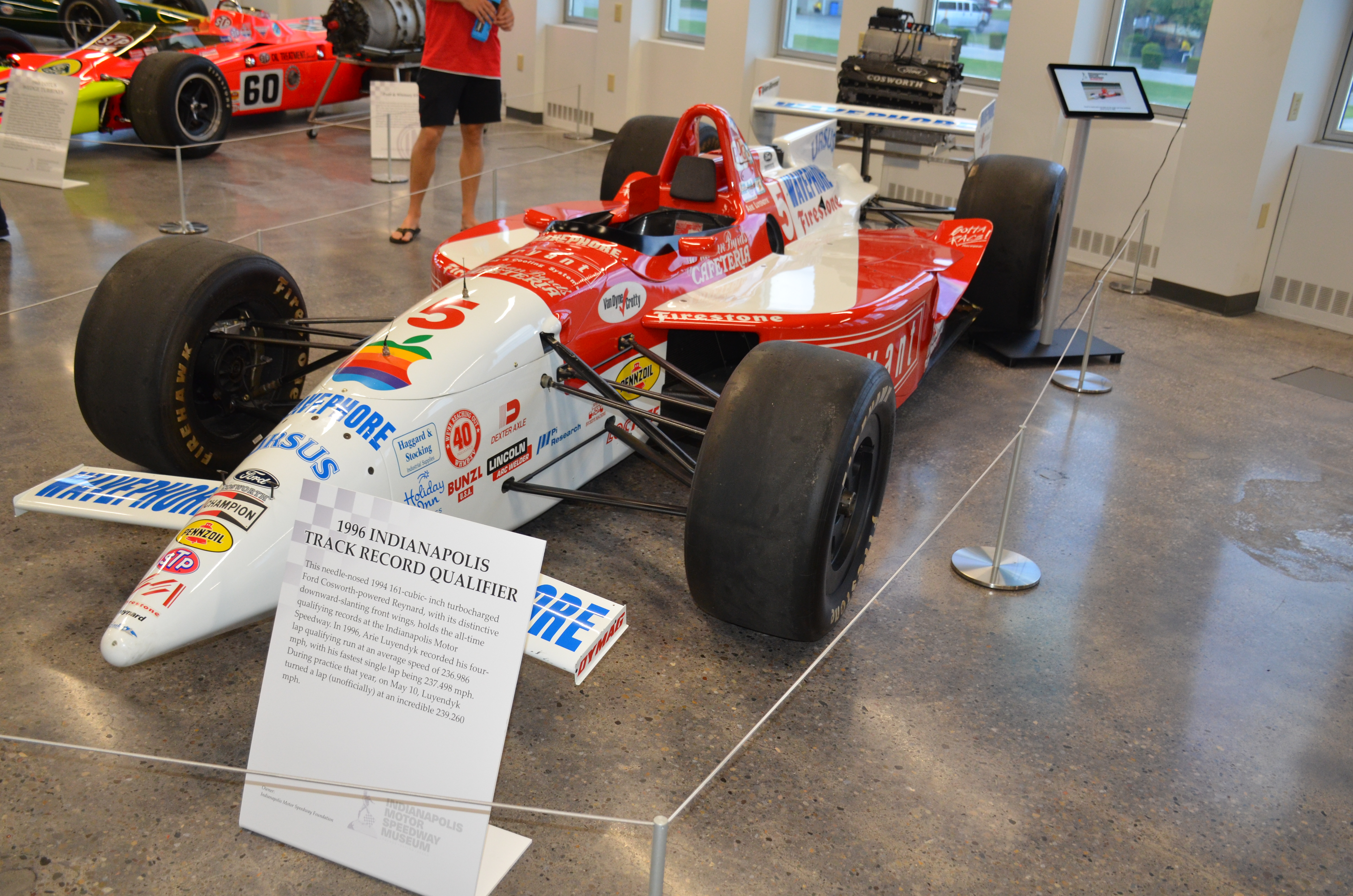
Luyendyk's IMS track record car.

Luyendyk brought home the team's first win in their second race together, winning the Dura-Lube 200 at Phoenix International Raceway. Later that season Luyendyk would set two qualifying records at the Indianapolis 500. Luyendyk would run 236.986 mph (381.392 km/h) over the four lap run, with a single best lap at 237.498 mph (382.216 km/h), both of which still stand as track records as of 2024. This run would not put Luyendyk on the pole position however, as the run was on the second day of time trials. Luyendyk's attempt on the first day of qualifications was disallowed when he failed technical inspection although it was good enough for the pole. His day two attempt was faster than his day one attempt. Ultimately Luyendyk was knocked out of the race in an accident.

== 1997 racing season ==
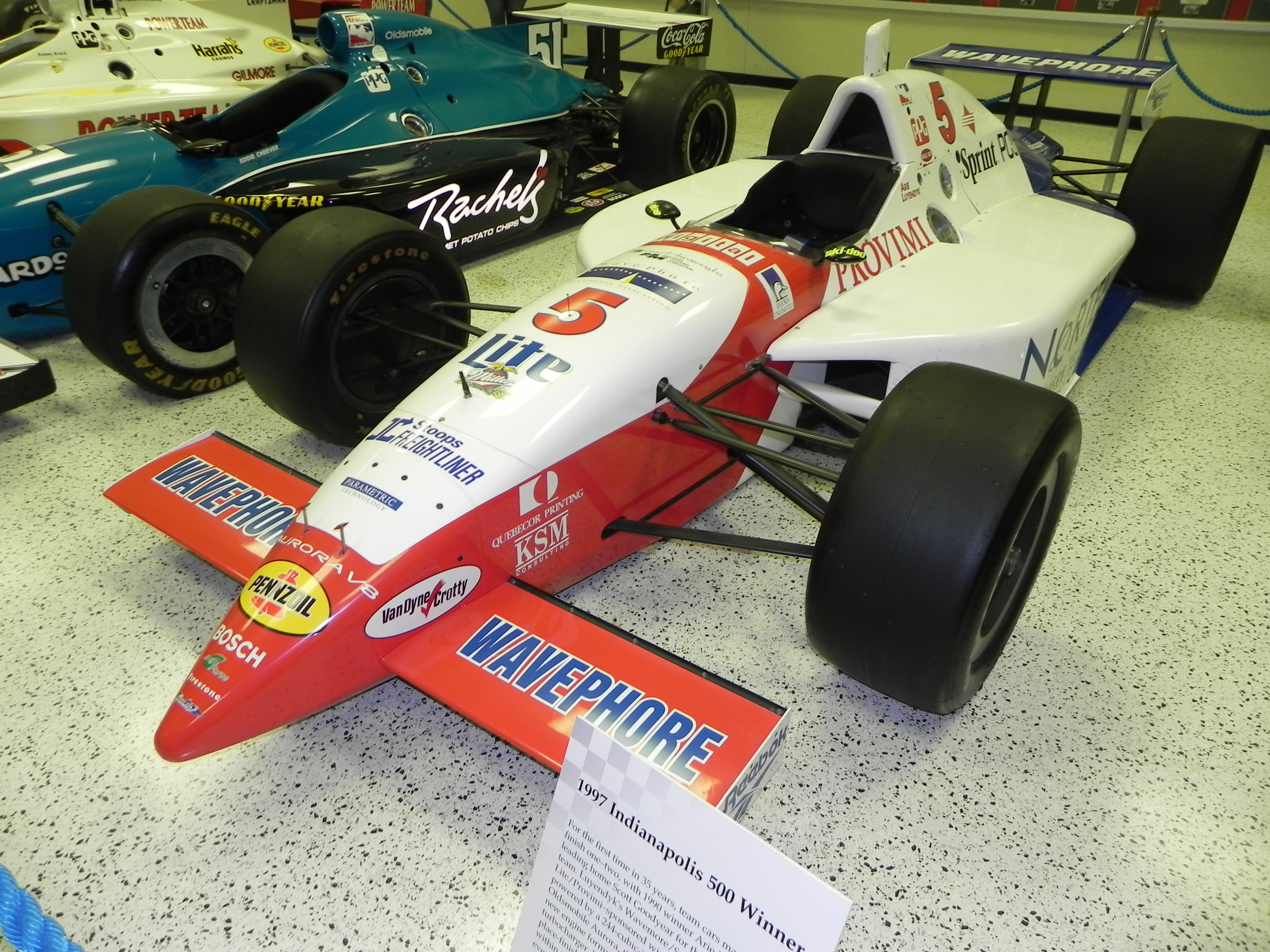
The 1997 Indianapolis 500 winning car.

The following year, good fortunes would continue to the race into the race as Luyendyk would win the 1997 Indianapolis 500 for Treadway Racing from the pole; new teammate Scott Goodyear finished second, making it a 1-2 sweep for Treadway Racing. Luyendyk would follow up by winning the True Value 500 at Texas Motor Speedway a fortnight later. The race is best remembered for the scoring controversy that would lead to USAC being removed from sanctioning duties by the IRL. Goodyear's more consistent results would put him one spot ahead of Luyendyk in the final season standings for 1997 despite not collecting a win.

== 1998 racing season ==
For 1998 Goodyear left Treadway Racing, leaving Luyendyk as the sole driver. Luyendyk won the final race of the season at Las Vegas Motor Speedway before retiring from full-time racing.

== 1999 racing season ==
Sam Schmidt was signed to replace Luyendyk for 1999 season. He would deliver the team a win at Las Vegas as Luyendyk had the prior season. This late season win combined with finishing 5th in the final season standings gave the team high hopes for 2000. An opportunity to achieve this success would not occur as a devastating pre-season testing injury at Walt Disney World Speedway would leave Schmidt paralyzed. The accident would leave Robby McGehee who had been signed to partner Schmidt as the team's sole driver. McGehee would only last one season.

== 2001 racing season ==
Felipe Giaffone would take the team's seat in 2001, bringing with him personal sponsorship from Hollywood Cigarettes. Ross & Diana Hubbard also joined the team as partners to Fred Treadway. Giaffone and the Hubbards would also last only one season.

== 2002 racing season ==
For 2002 Treadway's son Rick Treadway drove for the team for the first half of the season with Will Langhorne competing select events at the season's end. As teams from the CART World Series began to enter the IRL costs began to rise and squeeze out small teams such as Treadway Racing. The 2002 Chevy 500 at Texas Motor Speedway was Treadway Racing's final race in the Indy Racing League's top series.

== Treadway racing drivers ==
Full-Time Drivers

- (Brazil) Felipe Giaffone (2001)
- (Canada) Scott Goodyear (1997)
- (Netherlands) Arie Luyendyk (1996-'98)
- (United States) Robby McGehee (2000)
- (United States) Sam Schmidt (1999)
- (United States) Rick Treadway (2002)

Part-Time/Indy-Only Drivers

- (Brazil) Raul Boesel (2000)
- (United States) Will Langhorne (2002)
- (United States) Jason Leffler (2000)
- (Netherlands) Arie Luyendyk (1999, 2001-'02)

== Complete IRL/IndyCar Series results ==
(key) (Results in bold indicate pole position; results in italics indicate fastest lap)

Year	Chassis	Engine	Drivers	No.	1	2	3	4	5	6	7	8	9	10	11	12	13	14	15
1996					WDW	PHX	INDY												
1996	Reynard 95I	Ford-Cosworth XB	(Netherlands) Arie Luyendyk	5	14	**1**	16												
1996-97					NHA	LSV	WDW	PHX	INDY	TXS	PPIR	CLT	NHA2	LSV2					
1996-97	Reynard 95I	Ford-Cosworth XB	(Netherlands) Arie Luyendyk	5	13	**20**													
1996-97	G-Force GF01	Oldsmobile Aurora V8	(Netherlands) Arie Luyendyk	5			12	22	**1**	1	15	21	3	25					
1996-97	G-Force GF01	Oldsmobile Aurora V8	(Canada) Scott Goodyear	6			3	17	2	4	7	3	16	2					
1996-97	Reynard 94I	Ford-Cosworth XB	(United States) Johnny O'Connell	6		12													
1998					WDW	PHX	INDY	TXS	NHA	DOV	CLT	PPIR	ATL	TXS	LSV				
1998	G-Force GF01B	Oldsmobile Aurora V8	(Netherlands) Arie Luyendyk	5	8	24	20	13	5	9	4	22	8	28	1				
1999					WDW	PHX	CLT	INDY	TXS	PIK	ATL	DOV	PIK	LSV	TXS				
1999	G-Force GF01C	Oldsmobile Aurora V8	(United States) Jason Leffler	5	28														
1999	G-Force GF01C	Oldsmobile Aurora V8	(Netherlands) Arie Luyendyk	5				**22**											
1999	G-Force GF01C	Oldsmobile Aurora V8	(United States) Sam Schmidt	99	27	9	C^{1}	30	3	2	22	5	5	**1**	22				
2000					WDW	PHX	LSV	INDY	TXS	PIK	ATL	KTY	TXS						
2000	G-Force GF05	Oldsmobile Aurora V8	(United States) Robby McGehee	5	10	24	6	21	2	13	4	14	24						
2000	G-Force GF05	Oldsmobile Aurora V8	(United States) Jason Leffler	50				17											
2000	G-Force GF05	Oldsmobile Aurora V8	(United States) Jason Leffler	55			15												
2000	G-Force GF05	Oldsmobile Aurora V8	(Brazil) Raul Boesel	55				16											
2000	G-Force GF05	Oldsmobile Aurora V8	(Japan) Shigeaki Hattori	55				DNP	8	17	9	8	7						
2001					PHX	HOM	ATL	INDY	TXS	PIK	RIR	KAN	NSH	KTY	GAT	CHI	TXS		
2001	G-Force GF05B	Oldsmobile Aurora V8	(Netherlands) Arie Luyendyk	5				13											
2001	G-Force GF05B	Oldsmobile Aurora V8	(United States) Rick Treadway	5										17		14	5		
2001	G-Force GF05B	Oldsmobile Aurora V8	(Brazil) Felipe Giaffone	21	6	4	10	10	2	7	11	4	8	8	20	10	21		
2002					HOM	PHX	CAL	NAZ	INDY	TXS	PIK	RIR	KAN	NSH	MIS	KTY	GAT	CHI	TXS
2002	G-Force GF05C	Chevrolet Indy V8	(United States) Rick Treadway	5					16										
2002	G-Force GF05C	Chevrolet Indy V8	(United States) Rick Treadway	67															19
2002	G-Force GF05C	Chevrolet Indy V8	(United States) Rick Treadway	55	24	9	22	16		29			23						
2002	G-Force GF05C	Chevrolet Indy V8	(Netherlands) Arie Luyendyk	55					14						16				
2002	G-Force GF05C	Chevrolet Indy V8	(United States) Will Langhorne	55												18		13	23
2002	G-Force GF05C	Chevrolet Indy V8	(United States) Robby McGehee	55													12		

^{1} The 1999 VisionAire 500K at Charlotte was cancelled after 79 laps due to spectator fatalities.

== IndyCar wins ==
#	Season	Date	Sanction	Track / Race	No.	Winning driver	Chassis	Engine	Tire	Grid	Laps Led
1	1996	March 24	IRL	Phoenix International Raceway (O)	5	(Netherlands) Arie Luyendyk	Reynard 95i	Ford-Cosworth XB	Firestone	Pole	122
2	1996-97	May 27	IRL	Indianapolis 500 (O)	5	(Netherlands) Arie Luyendyk (2)	G-Force GF01	Oldsmobile Aurora V8	Firestone	Pole	61
3	1996-97	June 7	IRL	Texas Motor Speedway (O)	5	(Netherlands) Arie Luyendyk (3)	G-Force GF01	Oldsmobile Aurora V8	Firestone	11	20
4	1998	October 11	IRL	Las Vegas Motor Speedway (O)	5	(Netherlands) Arie Luyendyk (4)	G-Force GF01B	Oldsmobile Aurora V8	Goodyear	14	88
5	1999	September 26	IRL	Las Vegas Motor Speedway (O)	99	(United States) Sam Schmidt	G-Force GF01C	Oldsmobile Aurora V8	Firestone	Pole	35
