= Cahill Racing =

American auto racing team

Cahill Racing was an Indy Racing League IndyCar Series team owned by Iowa businessman Larry Cahill. The team initially was active from 1998 to 2002. From 1999 to 2000 the team was sponsored by Big Daddy's BBQ Sauce, a company with a history of failing to complete the commitments of their auto racing sponsorship contracts. However, the team was able to continue until 2002, the last season before large cost increases of the 2003 season brought by the former CART engine manufacturers and teams. The team's best finish during that time was a third place at the 2000 Phoenix International Raceway race by Donnie Beechler.

On 16 December 2006, Cahill announced that the team would be restarted for the 2007 season, with Venezuelan female driver Milka Duno confirmed in the first car. It was also announced that the team was trying to finalize a deal to race American sprint car driver Jeff Mitrisin in a second car. However, the deal apparently fell through and Cahill did not enter any IndyCar series races in 2007. Duno went on to drive for SAMAX Motorsport that season.

== Past drivers ==
- (United States) Donnie Beechler (1998-2000)
- (United States) Robby McGehee (2001-2002)
- (United States) Jack Miller (2001)

== Complete IRL IndyCar Series results ==
(key) (Results in bold indicate pole position; results in italics indicate fastest lap)

Year	Chassis	Engine	Drivers	No.	1	2	3	4	5	6	7	8	9	10	11	12	13	14	15	Pts Pos	Pos
1998					WDW	PHX	INDY	TXS	NHA	DOV	CLT	PPIR	ATL	TXS	LSV						
1998	G-Force GF01B	Oldsmobile Aurora V8	(United States) Donnie Beechler **(R)**	98			32	27	20		19	10	22	19	23					28th	71
1999					WDW	PHX	CLT	INDY	TXS	PPIR	ATL	DOV	PPIR	LSV	TXS						
1999	Dallara IR9	Oldsmobile Aurora V8	(United States) Donnie Beechler	98	26	11	C^{1}		17	22	8	10	20	18	11					21st	130
1999	G-Force GF01C	Oldsmobile Aurora V8	(United States) Donnie Beechler	98				29												21st	130
2000					WDW	PHX	LSV	INDY	TXS	PPIR	ATL	KTY	TXS								
2000	Dallara IR-00	Oldsmobile Aurora V8	(United States) Donnie Beechler	98	6	3	26	12	22	5	5	10	6							6th	202
2001					PHX	HMS	ATL	INDY	TXS	PPIR	RIR	KAN	NSH	KTY	GAT	CHI	TXS				
2001	Dallara IR-01	Oldsmobile Aurora V8	(United States) Robby McGehee	10	8	12	21	11	14			10	4	18	10	20	14			16th	196
2001	Dallara IR-01	Oldsmobile Aurora V8	(United States) Dr. Jack Miller	11			25	DNQ												46th	5
2002					HMS	PHX	FON	NAZ	INDY	TXS	PPIR	RIR	KAN	NSH	MCH	KTY	GAT	CHI	TXS		
2002	Dallara IR-02	Chevrolet Indy V8	(United States) Robby McGehee	10	14	21	17	13	DNQ											21st	142
