= Lyn St. James =

American race car driver (born 1947)

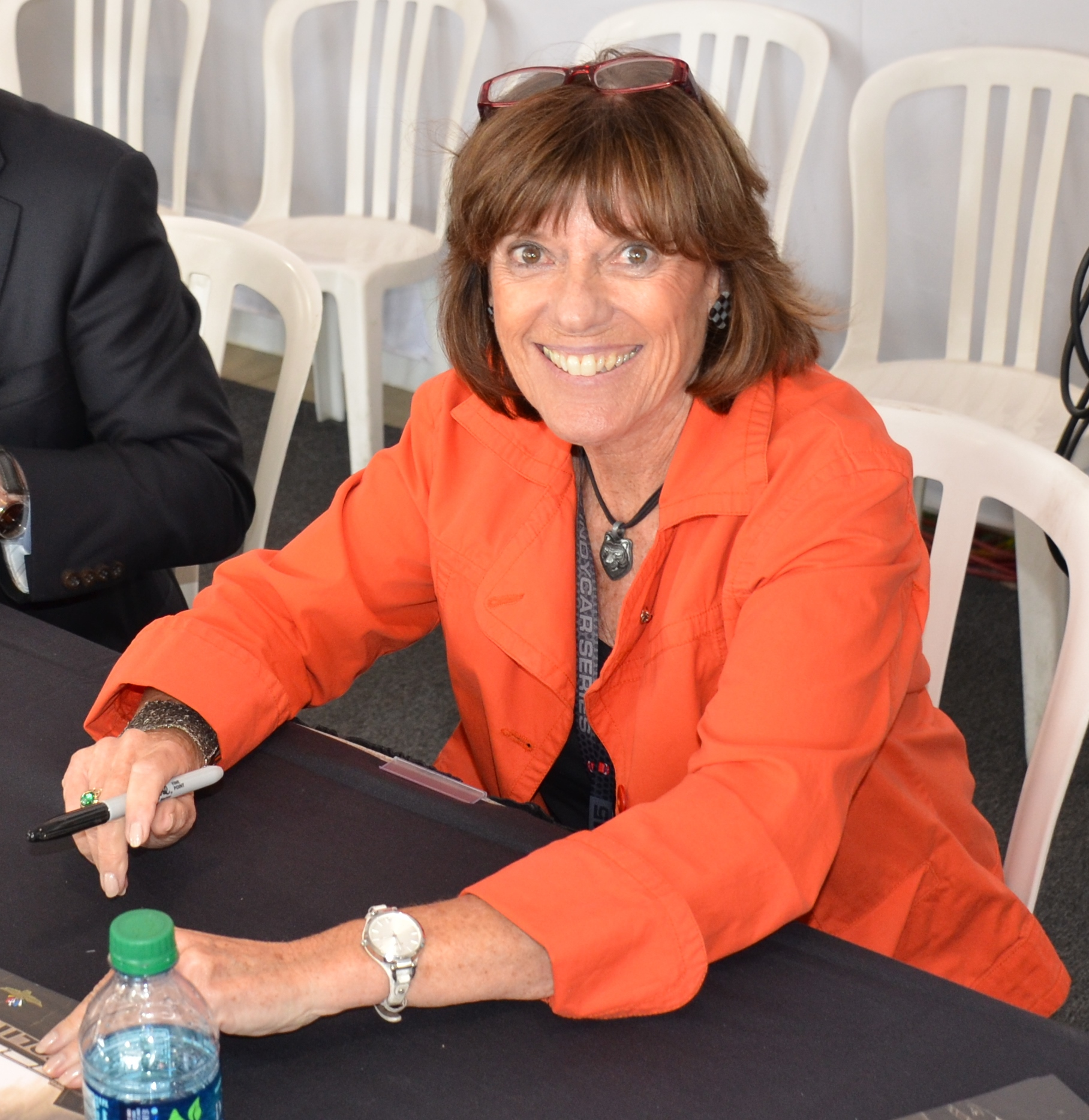
- St. James at the 2015 Indianapolis 500
- Born: Evelyn Gene Cornwall; March 13, 1947 (age 79) Willoughby, Ohio, U.S.
- Retired: 2001

Indy Racing League IndyCar Series
- Years active: 1996–2001
- Teams: Zunne Group Racing; Team Scandia; Hemelgarn Racing; Dick Simon Racing
- Starts: 5
- Wins: 0
- Poles: 0
- Best finish: 12th in 1996

Previous series
- 1992–1995: CART

Awards
- 1992: Indy 500 Rookie of the Year

Lyn St. James (born Evelyn Gene Cornwall, March 13, 1947) is an American former race car driver. She competed in the IndyCar series, with eleven CART and five Indy Racing League starts to her name. St. James is one of nine women who have qualified for the Indianapolis 500, and became the first woman to win the Indianapolis 500 Rookie of the Year award (oldest to win the award at 45, a record she held for thirty years until Jimmie Johnson won it when he was 46 in 2022). She also has two class victories at the 24 Hours of Daytona, and won the GTO class, partnering with Calvin Fish and Robby Gordon, at the 1990 12 Hours of Sebring. Additionally she has competed in endurance racing in Europe, including the 24 Hours of Le Mans and the 24 Hours of Nürburgring, run in 1979 only for near-stock Group 1 (motorsport) cars, at which her AMC Spirit AMX team placed first and second in class.

St. James founded the Women in the Winner's Circle Foundation in 1994 and is a motivational speaker. She has served on the board of trustees of Kettering University, and since 2015, serves as an appeal panelist for NASCAR's National Motorsports Appeals Panel.

In 1986, St. James was driving a Ford Probe during the IMSA LA Times Grand Prix at Riverside International Raceway and was in a big accident involving both Chip Robinson and Doc Bundy.

== Career ==
=== Achievements ===
St. James has been invited to the White House on multiple occasions, meeting with Presidents Ronald Reagan, George H. W. Bush, and Bill Clinton. She was also named by Sports Illustrated as among the “Top-100 Women Athletes of the Century." Working Woman Magazine added her to the “Top 350 Women who changed the world between 1976-1996.” In 1994, she was inducted into the Florida Sports Hall of Fame, and is only one of two women in it for auto racing. She was also President of the Women's Sports Foundation from 1990-1993. She was inducted in the West Coast Stock Car/Motorsports Hall of Fame in 2023.

=== Speed records ===
St. James set the world closed-course speed record for women three times. She became the first woman driver to reach over 200 mph on a race track when she drove a Ford Mustang Probe GTP to a lap of 204.223 mph at Talladega Superspeedway in 1985. In 1988, she used a Ford Thunderbird stock car to set the mark at 212.577 mph. During qualifying for the 1995 Indianapolis 500, St. James ran a lap of 225.722 mph.

== Racing record ==
=== 12 Hours of Sebring results ===
Year	Team	Co-Drivers	Car	Class	Laps	Pos.	Class Pos.
1978	(United States) Autodyne	(United States) Luis Sereix (United States) Phil Currin	Chevrolet Corvette	GTO	186	17th	6th
1979	(United States) Thunderbird Swap-Shop	(United States) Bonnie Henn (United States) Janet Guthrie	Ferrari 365 GTB/4	GTO	194	17th	8th
1980	(United States) Condor Racing	(United States) Ralph Kent-Cooke	Porsche 935	GTX	87	DNF	DNF
1983	(United Kingdom) Nimrod Racing	(United States) Reggie Smith (United States) Drake Olson	Nimrod NRA/C2-Aston Martin	GTP	224	5th	3rd
1987	(United States) Roush Racing	(United States) Tom Gloy	Ford Mustang	GTO	213	31st	9th
1988	(United States) Roush Racing	(United States) Deborah Gregg	Mercury Merkur XR4Ti	GTO	282	8th	2nd
1990	(United States) Roush Racing	(United States) Robby Gordon (United Kingdom) Calvin Fish	Mercury Cougar XR-7	GTO	278	6th	1st
1998	(United States) TRV Motorsport	(United States) Jeret Schroeder (United States) Tom Volk	Kudzu DL-4-Chevrolet	GTO	283	17th	4th

=== 24 Hours of Le Mans results ===
Year	Team	Co-Drivers	Car	Class	Laps	Pos.	Class Pos.
1989	(United Kingdom) Spice Engineering	(United Kingdom) Ray Bellm (United Kingdom) Gordon Spice	Spice SE89C-Ford	C1	229	DNF	DNF
1991	(Netherlands) Euro Racing (Japan) A.O. Racing	(South Africa) Desiré Wilson (France) Cathy Muller	Spice SE90C-Ford	C1	47	DNF	DNF

=== American Open Wheel racing results ===
(key)

==== CART ====
Year	Team	1	2	3	4	5	6	7	8	9	10	11	12	13	14	15	16	17	Rank	Points	Ref
1992	Dick Simon Racing	SRF	PHX	LBH	INDY; 11	DET	POR	MIL	NHA	TOR	MIC	CLE	ROA	VAN	MDO	NAZ	LS		31st	2	
1993	Dick Simon Racing	SRF	PHX; 13	LBH; 17	INDY; 25	MIL	DET; DNQ	POR; 20	CLE; 23	TOR	MIC; 22	NHA	ROA	VAN	MDO	NAZ	LS		36th	0	
1994	Dick Simon Racing	SRF	PHX	LBH	INDY; 19	MIL	DET	POR	CLE	TOR	MIC	MDO	NHA	VAN	ROA	NAZ	LS		48th	0	
1995	Dick Simon Racing	MIA	SRF	PHX	LBH	NAZ	INDY; 32	MIL; 20	DET	POR	ROA	TOR	CLE	MIC; 17	MDO	NHA	VAN	LS	39th	0	

==== IndyCar ====
Year	Team	1	2	3	4	5	6	7	8	9	10	11	Rank	Points	Ref
1996	Simon/Scandia Racing	WDW; 8											12th	186	
1996	Team Scandia		PHX; 21										12th	186	
1996	Zunne Group Racing			INDY; 14									12th	186	
1996–97	Hemelgarn Racing	NHM	LVS	WDW	PHX	INDY; 13	TXS	PPIR	CLT	NH2	LV2		42nd	22	
1998	Lyn St. James Racing	WDW	PHX	INDY; DNQ	TXS	NHM	DOV	CLT	PPIR	ATL	TX2	LVS	NC	–	
1999	Team Pelfrey	WDW	PHX	CLT	INDY; DNQ	TXS	PPIR	ATL	DOV	PPI2	LVS	TX2	NC	–	
2000	Dick Simon Racing	WDW	PHX	LVS	INDY; 32	TXS	PPIR	ATL	KTY	TX2			49th	1	

==== Indianapolis 500 ====
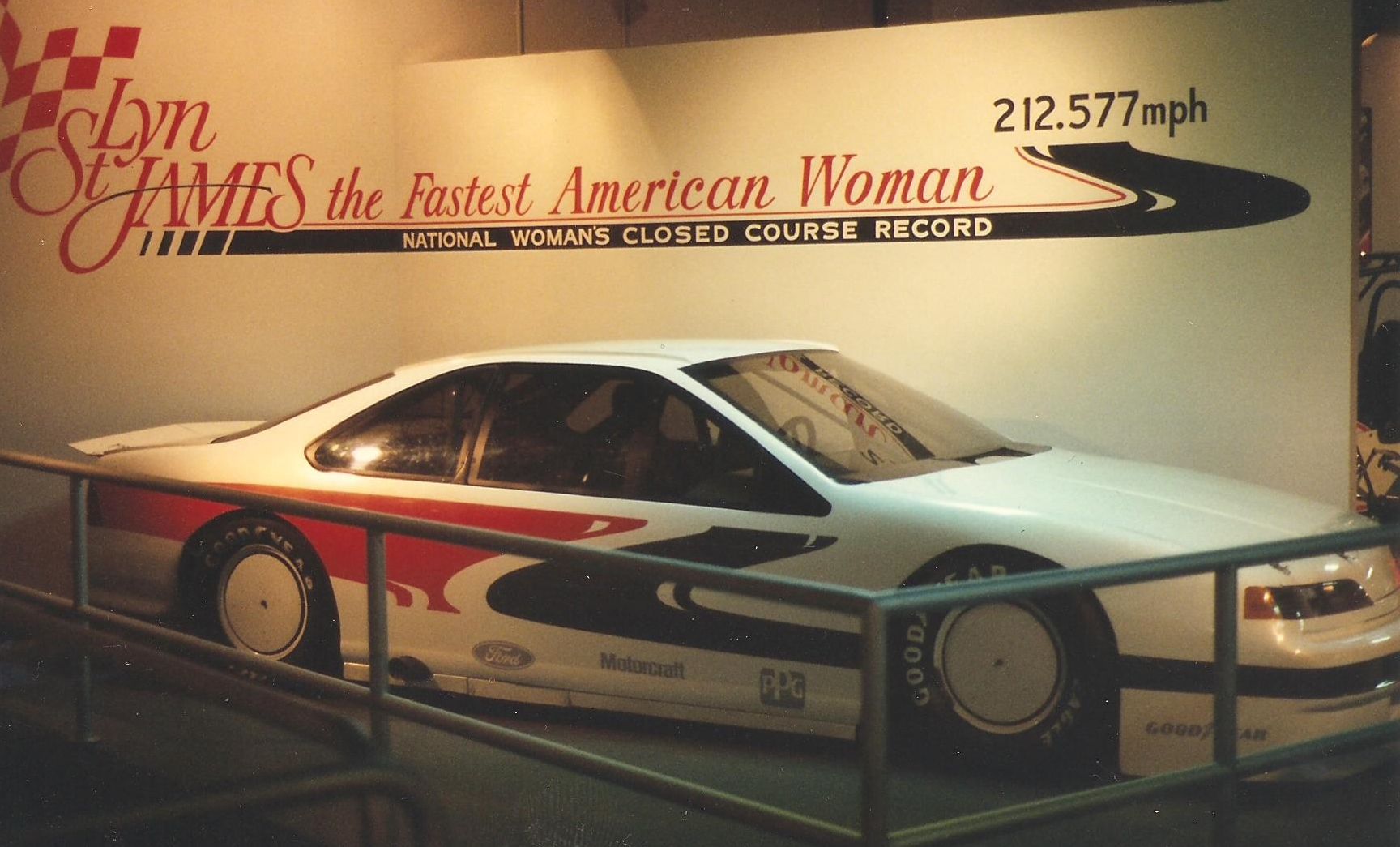
Female closed circuit speed record attempt car

Year	Chassis	Engine	Start	Finish
1992	Lola T91/00	Chevrolet A	27	11
1993	Lola T93/00	Ford-Cosworth XB	21	25
1994	Lola T94/00	Ford-Cosworth XB	6	19
1995	Lola T95/00	Ford-Cosworth XB	28	32
1996	Lola T94/00	Ford-Cosworth XB	18	14
1997	Dallara IR-7	Nissan Infiniti	34	13
1998	G-Force GF01	Nissan Infiniti	DNQ	
1999	G-Force GF01	Oldsmobile Aurora	DNQ	
2000	G-Force GF05	Oldsmobile Aurora	32	32

=== American Le Mans Series results ===
Year	Entrant	Class	Chassis	Engine	Tyres	1	2	3	4	5	6	7	8	Rank	Points
1999	TRV Motorsport	LMP	Riley & Scott Mk III	Chevrolet 6.0 L V8	G	SEB	ATL	MOS	SON	POR	PET ovr:Ret cls:Ret	MON	LSV	90th	0

== Personal life ==
Lyn St. James was born Carol Gene Cornwall, but shortly after birth, her first name was changed to Evelyn, after her aunt. After her first marriage to John Carusso, she changed her name to Lyn Carusso. Eventually she would adopt the professional name Lyn St. James in her business and racing activities. She got the idea from the name of actress Susan Saint James. Upon her divorce from Carusso, she legally changed her name to Lyn St. James.

Sporting positions
Preceded by Jeff Andretti	Indianapolis 500; Rookie of the Year; 1992	Succeeded by Nigel Mansell
