= 1998 Indianapolis 500 =

American motor race

82nd Indianapolis 500
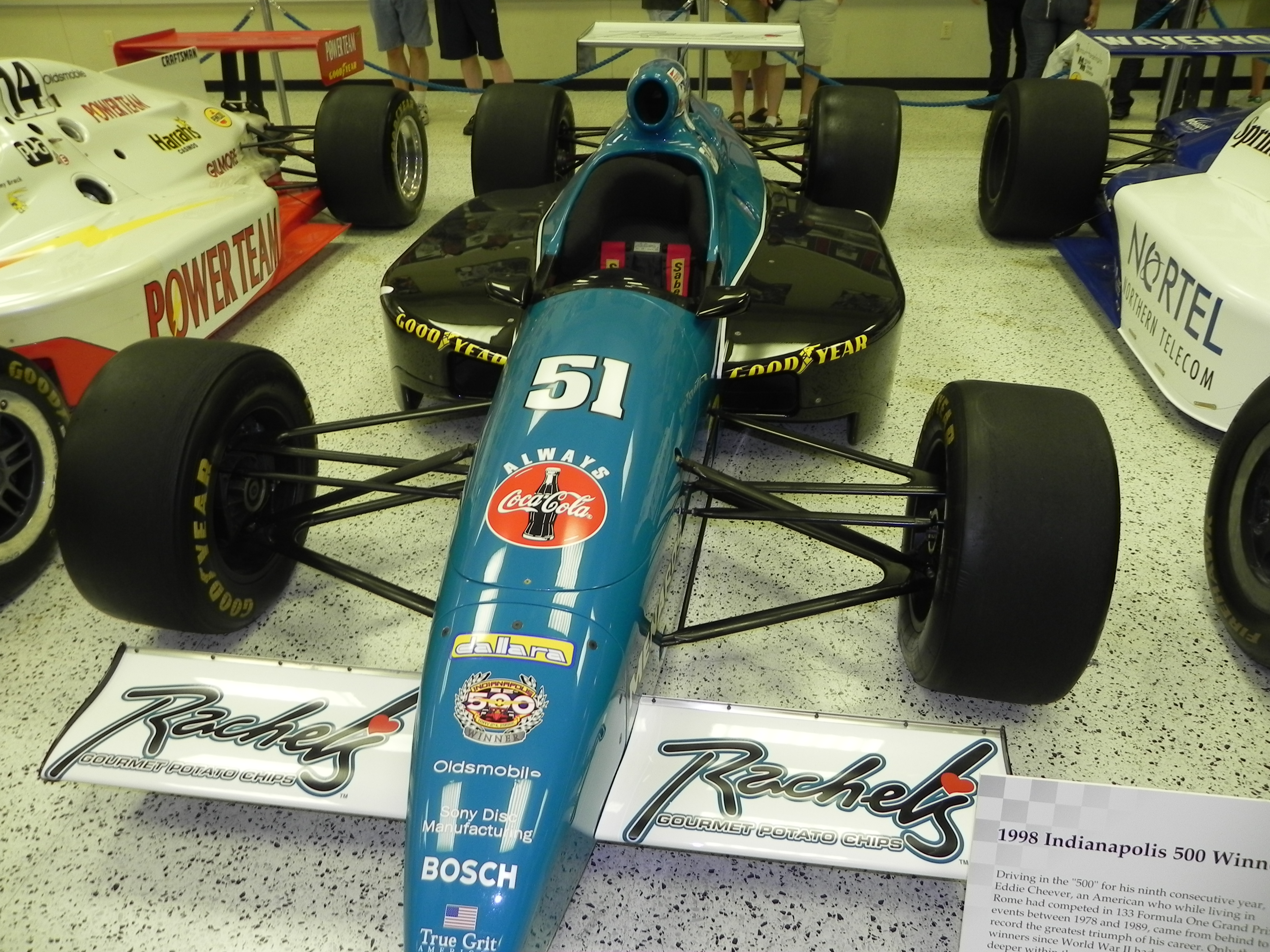

Indianapolis Motor Speedway

Indianapolis 500
- Sanctioning body: Indy Racing League
- Season: 1998 IRL season
- Date: May 24, 1998
- Winner: (United States) Eddie Cheever
- Winning team: Team Cheever
- Winning Chief Mechanic: Owen Snyder III
- Time of race: 3:26:40.524
- Average speed: 145.155 mph (234 km/h)
- Pole position: (United States) Billy Boat
- Pole speed: 223.503 mph (360 km/h)
- Fastest qualifier: (United States) Billy Boat
- Rookie of the Year: (United States) Steve Knapp
- Most laps led: (United States) Eddie Cheever (76)

Pre-race ceremonies
- National anthem: Elizabeth Burch
- "Back Home Again in Indiana": Jim Nabors
- Starting command: Mari Hulman George
- Pace car: Chevrolet Corvette
- Pace car driver: Parnelli Jones
- Starter: Bryan Howard
- Honorary starter: Mark Page (Pep Boys)
- Estimated attendance: 250,000

Television in the United States
- Network: ABC
- Announcers: Paul Page, Tom Sneva
- Nielsen ratings: 6.0 / 19

Chronology
Previous	Next
1997	1999

The 82nd Indianapolis 500 was held at the Indianapolis Motor Speedway in Speedway, Indiana on Sunday, May 24, 1998. This was the third Indianapolis 500 run as part of the Indy Racing League, but the first fully-sanctioned by the IRL after they relied on USAC to sanction the 1996 and 1997 races. The race was part of the 1998 Pep Boys Indy Racing League season.

Eddie Cheever, a former Formula One driver who had competed in Indy car racing since 1990, highlighted his racing career with this lone Indianapolis win. Cheever finished three seconds ahead of second place Buddy Lazier, the 1996 winner. Cheever became the first owner/driver to win the "500" since A. J. Foyt in 1977. During time trials, Billy Boat secured the first pole position at Indy for the Foyt team since 1975. The race is remembered for a chaotic pileup in turn three, which collected six cars and injured Jim Guthrie. Tony Stewart, in his third "500", and last such with Team Menard, blew an engine just after taking the lead on lap 21, and finished last (33rd).

This was the first Indianapolis victory for the Dallara chassis. In the second year utilizing the 4.0 L, normally aspirated, 32-valve production-based engines (Aurora L47 and Infiniti VH), qualifying speeds climbed, topping out nearly six miles per hour faster than 1997. The 1998 race ushered in a compacted, two-week schedule for the Indy 500, omitting an entire week of practice, and trimming qualifying from four days down to two. A morning shower delayed the start of the race by just over a half hour, but the race was run to completion without further interruption.

== Schedule ==
For 1998, the schedule for the month of May was trimmed down, in an effort to reduce costs. An experimental "two-week" schedule was utilized, consisting of one week of practice, and two days of time trials. Previously two full weeks of practice was used, along with four days (two weekends) of time trials. A four-day open test was scheduled in April which also included rookie orientation.

Race schedule — April, 1998
Sun	Mon	Tue	Wed	Thu	Fri	Sat
12	13	14; ROP	15; ROP	16; Open Test	17; Open Test	18
Race schedule — May, 1998
					1	2 Mini-Marathon
3	4	5	6	7	8	9
10; Opening Day	11; Practice	12; Practice	13; Practice	14; Practice	15; Practice	16; Pole Day
17; Bump Day	18	19	20	21; Carb Day	22	23; Parade
24; Indy 500	25; Memorial Day	26	27	28	29	30
31						

Color	Notes
Green	Practice
Dark Blue	Time trials
Silver	Race day
Red	Rained out*
Blank	No track activity

* Includes days where track
activity was significantly
limited due to rain

ROP — denotes Rookie
Orientation Program

== Background ==
=== Continuing split from CART ===
The ongoing IRL/CART split continued into its third year. The two series began moving further apart, and for the second time, no major teams from the CART ranks entered at Indianapolis. CART teams raced on Saturday at the Motorola 300.

=== Rule changes ===
- After controversy in 1997, the "25/8 Rule", which locked in entries to the starting field based on championship points standings, was scrapped for 1998. The 33-car field would revert to the traditional 33 fastest qualifiers.
- During qualifying, once the field is filled to 33, cars that subsequently bump their way into the field on the second day of time trials (Bump Day) will at that moment be (tentatively) slotted in the 33rd starting position, regardless of their overall speed rank on the second day. Previously cars that bumped their way into the field lined up based on speed rank of the day they qualified. The change was made to encourage more cars qualifying on pole day. As a result, the field was lined up the order of: first day (pole day) qualifiers, followed by second day qualifiers (those that qualified before the field was filled to 33), followed by cars that bumped their way into the field on the second day.
- A new rule change for 1998 allowed cars to return to the garage area to make repairs and subsequently re-enter the race. Previously, all repairs (whether major or minor) had to be done in the pit area only. Prior to 1998, any car that crossed the entrance to Gasoline Alley was ruled out of the race, regardless of its condition. Likewise, any stalled car towed back to the garage area through escape roads in the infield (instead of around the circuit itself) was ruled out of the race, even if the issue was something as harmless as running out of fuel (that aspect of the rule was the source of controversy in the 1972 race with Jim Hurtubise). The repair rule change was made at the request of teams, which considered it a safety measure, as well as a fair way to allow more cars to finish the race. Pit crew members working for extended periods of time on the actual pit lane felt exposed to injuries/accidents from other cars entering and exiting the pits literally inches away. It also allowed them access to necessary tools and allowed them to make major repairs. This new rule was similar in practice to the policy that NASCAR had, where cars were allowed to "go behind the wall" to make repairs and re-enter the competition. A limit was enforced, however, such that no car could make repairs and re-enter the race after the leaders completed 190 laps.

== Entry list ==
The first entry list was published on April 14. The 34 cars that had run in any of the first two rounds of 1998 were entered, including the #27 Blueprint Racing entry, initially unassigned after Robbie Groff failed to complete a racing lap. The car was initially scheduled to be run by Cary Faas at the Rookie Orientation Program, but the test never happened. RSM Marko also failed to undertake his scheduled Rookie Orientation Program test with driver Dave Steele, and the team would not appear afterwards, while Team Coulson Racing never appointed a driver for the #41 car.

Earlier in the month, D. B. Mann Motorsports had named Dan Drinan in the #24 car driven by Billy Roe at Orlando. Two cars had driver changes before the start of practice due to budgetary issues: Chitwood Motorsports signed Andy Michner in the #17 car the day before ROP in place of Brian Tyler, both passing their tests with the team, and PDM Racing replaced John Paul Jr. on May 5 with rookie Jack Hewitt, who had passed all but one of his rookie test phases in Jack Miller's Sinden Racing entry on April. Finally, Blueprint announced during Opening Day that the #27 seat would go to second-year driver Claude Bourbonnais.

Before the start of practice, eight further car/driver combinations were registered, pushing the total to 40 competitors. Team Scandia announced the signing of Billy Roe for a second car in late March, both Robby Unser and Steve Knapp were announced for additional entries by Team Cheever and ISM Racing on April 9, and Donnie Beechler was confirmed a day later for a new team, Cahill Auto Racing. At the release of the entry list, Lyn St. James confirmed her programme as a driver/owner, while LP Racing entered a second car for Scott Harrington. In the final week leading to practice, Joe Gosek was signed by new outfit Liberty Racing, and veteran Danny Ongais received a call-up before Opening Day to drive for yet another new team, Pelfrey, which had been denied a request to field Shawn Bayliff due to a lack of experience.

No.	Driver	Team	Chassis	Engine	Tires
1	(United States) Tony Stewart	Team Menard	Dallara	Oldsmobile	Firestone
3	(United States) Robbie Buhl	Team Menard	Dallara	Oldsmobile	Firestone
4	(Canada) Scott Goodyear	Panther Racing	G-Force	Oldsmobile	Goodyear
5	(Netherlands) Arie Luyendyk W	Treadway Racing	G-Force	Oldsmobile	Firestone
6	(United States) Davey Hamilton	Nienhouse Motorsports	G-Force	Oldsmobile	Goodyear
7	(United States) Jimmy Kite R	Team Scandia	Dallara	Oldsmobile	Goodyear
8	(United States) Scott Sharp	Kelley Racing	Dallara	Oldsmobile	Goodyear
9	(United States) Johnny Unser^{1}	Hemelgarn Racing	Dallara	Oldsmobile	Goodyear
10	(United States) Mike Groff^{2}	Byrd-Cunningham Racing	G-Force	Oldsmobile	Firestone
11	(United States) Billy Boat	A. J. Foyt Enterprises	Dallara	Oldsmobile	Goodyear
12	(United States) Buzz Calkins	Bradley Motorsports	G-Force	Oldsmobile	Goodyear
14	(Sweden) Kenny Bräck	A. J. Foyt Enterprises	Dallara	Oldsmobile	Goodyear
15	(Chile) Eliseo Salazar^{3}	Riley & Scott Cars	Riley & Scott	Oldsmobile	Goodyear
16	(Brazil) Marco Greco	Phoenix Racing	G-Force	Oldsmobile	Firestone
17	(United States) Andy Michner R	Chitwood Motorsports	Dallara	Oldsmobile	Goodyear
18	(United States) Jack Hewitt R	PDM Racing	G-Force	Oldsmobile	Goodyear
19	(United States) Stan Wattles R	Metro Racing Systems	Riley & Scott	Oldsmobile	Goodyear
20	(United States) Tyce Carlson	Immke Racing	Dallara	Oldsmobile	Goodyear
21	(Colombia) Roberto Guerrero	Pagan Racing	Dallara	Oldsmobile	Goodyear
22	(absent)^{4}	RSM Marko	Dallara	Oldsmobile	Firestone
23	(United States) Paul Durant	CBR Cobb Racing	G-Force	Oldsmobile	Goodyear
24	(United States) Dan Drinan R	D. B. Mann Motorsports	Dallara	Oldsmobile	Goodyear
27	(Canada) Claude Bourbonnais	Blueprint Racing	Dallara	Oldsmobile	Firestone
28	(United States) Mark Dismore	Kelley Racing	Dallara	Oldsmobile	Goodyear
29	(United States) Joe Gosek	Liberty Racing	G-Force	Oldsmobile	Firestone
30	(Brazil) Raul Boesel	McCormack Motorsports	G-Force	Oldsmobile	Goodyear
33	(United States) Billy Roe	Team Scandia	Dallara	Oldsmobile	Goodyear
35	(United States) Jeff Ward	ISM Racing	G-Force	Oldsmobile	Goodyear
40	(United States) Jack Miller	Sinden Racing Services	Dallara	Infiniti	Firestone
41	(absent)^{4}	Team Coulson Racing	G-Force	Oldsmobile	Firestone
44	(United States) J. J. Yeley R	Sinden Racing Services	Dallara	Oldsmobile	Firestone
51	(United States) Eddie Cheever	Team Cheever	Dallara	Oldsmobile	Goodyear
52	(United States) Robby Unser R	Team Cheever	Dallara	Oldsmobile	Goodyear
53	(United States) Jim Guthrie	ISM Racing	G-Force	Oldsmobile	Goodyear
54	(Japan) Hideshi Matsuda^{5}	Beck Motorsports	Dallara	Infiniti	Firestone
55	(United States) Steve Knapp R	ISM Racing	G-Force	Oldsmobile	Goodyear
66	(United States) Scott Harrington	LP Racing	Dallara	Oldsmobile	Firestone
68	(absent)^{6}	CBR Cobb Racing	G-Force	Oldsmobile	Goodyear
77	(France) Stéphan Grégoire	Chastain Motorsports	G-Force	Oldsmobile	Goodyear
81	(United States) John Paul Jr.^{7}	Team Pelfrey	Dallara	Oldsmobile	Firestone
90	(United States) Lyn St. James	Lyn St. James Racing	G-Force	Infiniti	Goodyear
91	(United States) Buddy Lazier W	Hemelgarn Racing	Dallara	Oldsmobile	Goodyear
97	(United States) Greg Ray	Knapp Motorsports	Dallara	Oldsmobile	Firestone
98	(United States) Donnie Beechler R	Cahill Auto Racing	G-Force	Oldsmobile	Firestone
99	(United States) Sam Schmidt	LP Racing	Dallara	Oldsmobile	Firestone

- W Former winner
- R Indy 500 Rookie
1. Entered on May 11.
2. (United States) Brian Tyler R took laps in the spare car on Bump Day while Groff hadn't qualified yet for the race.
3. Switched to the #19 spare car on Bump Day after being bumped from the field.
4. The car was entered without a driver, and never took part in practice.
5. Entered on May 14.
6. Jaques Lazier was entered, but claimed he didn't have a program in place, and neither he or the car took part in practice.
7. Entered on May 14. (United States) Danny Ongais, the entry's original driver, was injured in a crash on May 11.

== Practice ==
=== Sunday May 10 ===
Opening day saw Mike Groff take the honor of "first car on the track." Crashes during the day were suffered by Jack Hewitt and Jimmy Kite, neither were serious. Robbie Buhl was the fastest car of the day, at 219.325 mph.

=== Monday May 11 ===
Tony Stewart led the speed chart, with a lap of 223.703 mph. It was the fastest lap since the normally aspirated engine formula was adopted in 1997. Eight drivers in total broke the 200 mph barrier.

Danny Ongais suffered the most serious crash thus far for the month, and was sidelined with a concussion. He would never race an IndyCar/Champ Car again. Arie Luyendyk, Mike Groff, Raul Boesel and Tony Stewart all suffered mechanical problems, and required tows back to the garage area.

Off the track, Eddie Cheever announced a sponsorship deal with Rachel's Gourmet Potato Chips.

=== Tuesday May 12 ===
Tony Stewart nearly matched his speed from a day before, with a fast lap of 223.691 mph. Second best Kenny Bräck was a full 2 mph slower at 221.593 mph.

Sunny skies, with temperatures in the 70s greeted the Speedway for the third day in a row.

=== Wednesday May 13 ===
Moisture from an overnight shower delayed the start of practice for about a half-hour. Billy Boat took the honors for fastest of the day at 221.691 mph, while Tony Stewart sat out the day. Temperatures topped out at 80 degrees late in the day.

=== Thursday May 14 ===
Jimmy Kite suffered his second wall contact of the week, backing the car into the wall in turn 4. Another warm, 83 degree afternoon saw Tony Stewart once again on top of the speed chart (223.430 mph).

=== "Fast" Friday May 15 ===
The final day of practice before pole day was warm, with a high of 81 degrees. Tony Stewart topped the speed chart with the fastest lap of the month (223.797 mph). Kenny Bräck and Billy Boat were also over 221 mph.

Boat, however, wrecked his primary car in turn 3 shortly after the 11 a.m. start. Also spinning in a separate incident (but not making contact) was Jack Hewitt.

At the close of practice, Tony Stewart entered time trials as the favorite for the pole position. Stewart led the speed chart on four of the six days of practice (sitting out one day). Foyt drivers Kenny Bräck and Billy Boat were also front row favorites, however, Boat's crash on Friday seemed to dim his chances.

== Time trials ==
=== Pole Day – Saturday May 16 ===
Pole day dawned sunny and clear, with temperatures in the high 70s. Qualifying started on-time promptly at 11 a.m., but saw two early wave-offs. The first two notable runs were put in by Robbie Buhl (220.236 mph) and Tony Stewart (220.386 mph), but the speeds were down from their expectations.

At noon, Kenny Bräck took over the provisional pole with a run of 220.982 mph. Minutes later, Jimmy Kite crashed for the third time of the week. At 12:45 p.m., Billy Boat took to the track for his run. His first lap was a remarkable 224.573 mph, the fastest lap of the month. The three other laps dropped off, but his four-lap average of 223.503 mph was fast enough to secure the pole position.

Sixteen cars completed runs before the mid-afternoon down time. Around 4:15 p.m., qualifying resumed, with drivers Scott Sharp and Eddie Cheever among those making the field. At 5:15 p.m., Greg Ray squeezed onto the front row, as the second-fastest qualifier (221.125 mph).

At the end of the day, the field was filled to 26 cars, after a record 42 qualifying attempts. Among the notables not yet in the field were Arie Luyendyk, Lyn St. James, and Jeff Ward. Luyendyk suffered through engine trouble most of the day.

Billy Boat's unexpected speed in qualifying drew the attention of competitors, given that it occurred in the heat of the day, and it was 2 1/2 miles per hour faster than he had run all week. Team Menard threatened to protest, and accused Foyt Racing of cheating by illegally using nitrous. The Indy Racing League took no action, and Boat was not penalized.

=== Bump Day – Sunday May 17 ===
With seven positions remaining in the field, the second and final day of time trials saw heavy activity. In the first hour, veterans Raul Boesel, Arie Luyendyk and Jeff Ward were among the early qualifiers. Scott Harrington, however, blew an engine and wrecked on his second lap, which put a halt to qualifying for nearly 45 minutes.

In the heat of the day (1:52 p.m.), Eliseo Salazar completed a run at 216.259 mph, the second-slowest in the field. His run was followed by a long down-time, as teams waited for optimum conditions.

At 4:30 p.m., qualifying resumed, and several cars took to the track. During the next hour, 13 attempts were made, but only 5 were run to completion. After three wrecks for the week, Jimmy Kite found the needed speed, and managed to fill the field to 33 cars at 4:55 p.m. With Billy Roe (215.781 mph) the first driver on the bubble, Mike Groff bumped him out at 5:23 p.m. That put Eliseo Salazar (216.259 mph) on the bubble. Minutes later, Roe went back out and bumped his way back into the field. The move placed Johnny Unser (216.316 mph) now on the bubble.

Claude Bourbonnais, Dan Drinan, and Lyn St. James all fell short of Johnny Unser's speed, and failed to bump him out. With four minutes remaining, Eliseo Salazar scrambled into Stan Wattles' back-up car, but managed only 211 mph on the first two laps. The car began smoking, and he was waved off. The 6 o'clock gun fired with Hideshi Matsuda waiting in line.

With Lyn St. James having failed to qualify, the 500 had an all-male field for the first time since 1991.

== Carburetion Day ==
The final practice session was held Thursday May 21. The Foyt entries of Kenny Bräck and Billy Boat top the speed chart. Bräck (220.994 mph) was the only driver over 220 mph. No incidents were reported, but Stan Wattles twice stalled on the track with mechanical problems.

=== Pit Stop Challenge ===
The 22nd annual Coors Pit Stop Challenge was held Thursday May 21. Eight teams competed for a $40,000 top prize. The top three race qualifiers and their respective pit crews were automatically eligible: Billy Boat, Greg Ray, and Kenny Bräck. Five additional spots would be earned by teams that won the Pit Performance Award at the seven IRL races held since the previous year's Indy 500.

To win the Pit Performance Award at a race, all cars were timed for their pit stops (entrance to exit). The driver with the lowest total elapsed time in the pit area during each race, provided that driver won the race or was running at the finish - within ten laps of the winner - would earn the berth. The drivers that earned berths were as follows: Arie Luyendyk (Texas), Tony Stewart (PPIR), Eddie Cheever (Charlotte), Robbie Buhl (Loudon), and Scott Goodyear (Las Vegas, Phoenix). Cheever chose to not participate in the event. His slot was filled by Buddy Lazier for a total of eight entries. Treadway Racing was initially eligible for two slots, but the team dropped down to a one-car operation for 1998. Scott Goodyear, who earned a berth with Treadway at Las Vegas in 1997 parted ways with the team during the offseason. However, he re-qualified for the event with Panther in early 1998.

The eight-team, head-to-head elimination competition was held after the final practice. Panther Racing and driver Scott Goodyear defeated Team Menard with driver Robbie Buhl in the finals. Buhl's car failed to leave the pit box. It was Panther's first of two victories in the event. Galles Racing, which had won the previous two years (and five overall), did not participate, as they did not compete in the IRL during the 1998 season.

Quarterfinals
11	Billy Boat (A. J. Foyt Enterprises)	14.435
91	Buddy Lazier (Hemelgarn Racing)	20.420
3	Robbie Buhl (Team Menard)	16.660
1	Tony Stewart (Team Menard)	17.215
4	Scott Goodyear (Panther Racing)	13.967
97	Greg Ray (Knapp Motorsports)	21.114
5	Arie Luyendyk (Treadway Racing)	12.704
14	Kenny Bräck (A. J. Foyt Enterprises)	16.802

Semifinals
3	Robbie Buhl (Team Menard)	13.223
11	Billy Boat (A. J. Foyt Enterprises)	16.247
4	Scott Goodyear (Panther Racing)	12.684
5	Arie Luyendyk (Treadway Racing)	13.215

Finals
4	Scott Goodyear (Panther Racing)	17.307
3	Robbie Buhl (Team Menard)	no time

== Starting grid ==
Row	Inside		Middle		Outside	
1	11	(United States) Billy Boat	97	(United States) Greg Ray	14	(Sweden) Kenny Bräck
2	1	(United States) Tony Stewart	3	(United States) Robbie Buhl	99	(United States) Sam Schmidt
3	8	(United States) Scott Sharp	6	(United States) Davey Hamilton	21	(Colombia) Roberto Guerrero
4	4	(Canada) Scott Goodyear	91	(United States) Buddy Lazier W	28	(United States) Mark Dismore
5	44	(United States) J. J. Yeley R	16	(Brazil) Marco Greco	40	(United States) Dr. Jack Miller
6	81	(United States) John Paul Jr.	51	(United States) Eddie Cheever	12	(United States) Buzz Calkins
7	17	(United States) Andy Michner R	53	(United States) Jim Guthrie	52	(United States) Robby Unser R
8	18	(United States) Jack Hewitt R	55	(United States) Steve Knapp R	98	(United States) Donnie Beechler R
9	9	(United States) Johnny Unser	7	(United States) Jimmy Kite R	35	(United States) Jeff Ward
10	5	(Netherlands) Arie Luyendyk W	19	(United States) Stan Wattles R	30	(Brazil) Raul Boesel
11	77	(France) Stéphan Grégoire	10	(United States) Mike Groff	33	(United States) Billy Roe

=== Alternates ===
- First alternate: (Chile) Eliseo Salazar (#15) - Bumped
- Second alternate: (United States) Lyn St. James (#90) - Too slow

=== Failed to qualify ===
- #20 (United States) Tyce Carlson - practice crash
- #27 (Canada) Claude Bourbonnais - Too slow
- #29 (United States) Joe Gosek
- #54 (Japan) Hideshi Matsuda
- #66 (United States) Scott Harrington
- #24 (United States) Dan Drinan R
- #23 (United States) Paul Durant

== Race recap ==
=== Pre race ===
Rain fell during the morning of the race, delaying the start of the race by about 35 minutes. During track drying efforts, a dog sneaked out onto the track in turn four, and ran down the pit lane while eluding officials, all the way to turn two before being caught. Mari Hulman George finally gave the command to start engines at 11:32 a.m. EST. Before the final pace lap, Raul Boesel went into the pits with a fuel pump problem and missed the start of the race. Boesel would only complete three racing laps before being towed to the garage on Lap 8, going on to lose 35 laps until he was back on track.

=== Start ===
At the start, Eddie Cheever got loose in turn one, and pinched J. J. Yeley down to the inside, which resulted in a half-spin for both of them, and an early caution for three laps. Despite a slight contact, Cheever continued unharmed. Yeley managed to stop the car and not hit the wall, but his engine stalled, and lost a lap before being restarted by safety crews.

At the front of the field, Billy Boat led the first dozen laps, while Kenny Bräck dropped on the restart from third to tenth after missing a shift. On lap 13, Greg Ray took over the lead, and Tony Stewart charged in third after exchanging passes with teammate Robbie Buhl. On Lap 16, Buddy Lazier pitted out of sequence from tenth place, as part of an alternative strategy. By Lap 19, Bräck had regained third place, passing Buhl and Boat in the same lap.

On Lap 21, Ray was slowed by traffic, and Stewart dove into the lead down the main stretch. Just one lap later, Stewart's engine blew as he approached the finish line, coasting to a stop in the outside of turn 1. A dejected Stewart threw his steering wheel and gloves into his empty cockpit, as misfortune had struck him again for the third straight "500".

"Well, I mean, this is the only thing I've ever wanted to do in my life, this has been my number one goal, and every year I get shit on doing it, so... How would you feel?"

— Tony Stewart, in a live interview during ABC's broadcast.

=== First half ===
Under caution, the first round of pit stops featured an incident between Jeff Ward and Stéphan Grégoire. After being serviced, Ward damaged his front wing when he collided with the left rear tyre of Grégoire, who was entering his pit box. Billy Boat fell to the bottom of the top 10 after stalling his car, and Arie Luyendyk stalled three times before getting back on the track, due to a clutch issue that prevented him from downshifting into first or second gear. Just before the restart, Scott Goodyear relinquished his fourth place because of clutch issues, losing 35 laps for repairs.

Greg Ray led the race order on Lap 27 ahead of Kenny Bräck and Davey Hamilton, but restarted the race behind Luyendyk and Lazier, both still on the lead lap. Eddie Cheever had not stopped in the previous caution and was already up to 10th place, having passed several cars before. On Lap 32, race leader Ray slowed suddenly on the backstraight with a broken transmission. He made it to the pits, and rejoined the race 18 laps later. As other cars briefly slowed down, Robbie Buhl took advantage and passed Hamilton for second place behind new race leader Kenny Bräck.

On Lap 34, Donnie Beechler broke an engine and brought out the third caution, which included Lazier's second pit stop and Boat making additional stops to correct handling issues in his car. At the end of the caution period, Robbie Buhl encountered water temperature problems in his engine. He lost places to Hamilton and Scott Sharp after the Lap 39 restart, and was already down in seventh place when he suffered yet another engine failure, ending Team Menard's race on Lap 45. Before the yellow, Cheever had continued his charge towards the front; having passed Roberto Guerrero and rookie Steve Knapp earlier, he also got past Sam Schmidt, Buhl and Sharp to claim third place, just missing on a pass for second over Hamilton when the caution came out.

"Going into (turn) 3, I thought Davey saw me, I thought we were gonna go through side by side. At the last minute, he just took his line, which is his right, and I just stood on the brakes, and then just all hell broke loose after that"

— Sam Schmidt, in a live interview during ABC's broadcast.

Buzz Calkins and Buddy Lazier, both out of sequence, led the restart as the green came out on Lap 49, while Billy Boat's gearbox finally seized as it got stuck in second gear. Several cars were running two-wide at the front of the field, when a major crash occurred in turn 3. Sam Schmidt, who tried an inside pass on Davey Hamilton for second place, got into the grass, lost control, and spun backwards into the turn three wall. Eddie Cheever was immediately behind after getting passed by Schmidt, but slipped underneath and escaped the incident. Stan Wattles ran into the back of Mark Dismore, and both cars collected Roberto Guerrero.

As he approached the scene, Jim Guthrie tried to avoid the crash by shortcutting into the grass. Just as he rejoined the racetrack, he collected an errant wing from Schmidt's car that fell in front of his car, and his machine shot head-on into the outside wall. Guthrie was extricated by the medical team and transported to Methodist Hospital with a broken elbow, a broken leg and cracked ribs. Billy Roe avoided the incident at first, but spun the car on the deceleration lane between turns 3 and 4, and crashed into the inside wall.

After a long yellow flag, and a series of pit stops, Kenny Bräck and Eddie Cheever were leading the race over Scott Sharp. Owing to good restarts and the high attrition, Arie Luyendyk was up to fourth place over the improving John Paul Jr. and Davey Hamilton, who had minor repairs during his pit stop. Buddy Lazier, on the other hand, stayed out in the lead until Lap 61 and was placed in tenth at the time, with 13 cars on the lead lap. The race went back to green on Lap 64, and Cheever took the lead for the first time on Lap 68. Paul Jr. progressed into second place by Lap 73, while Sharp lost places steadily.

Green flag pit stops began on Lap 83, with Buddy Lazier pitting ten laps later. Arie Luyendyk had to be pushed out due to his clutch issues, and a miscalculation by Foyt's crew caused Kenny Bräck to run out of fuel, costing him two laps. The gaffe angered A. J. Foyt, who was caught on the TV broadcast scolding his engineers and smashing one of the team's laptops. Eddie Cheever left his pit box before his crew removed the fuel nozzle and lost some time, but he managed to retain the lead by 1.5 seconds over John Paul Jr., with Davey Hamilton another five seconds behind and Robby Unser holding Luyendyk for fourth. As more drivers were being lapped, Steve Knapp and Lazier were the last cars on the lead lap, half a minute behind. Just after the pit stop window, another yellow came out on Lap 96 when Jimmy Kite stopped along the track.

=== Second half ===
With just seven cars on the lead lap, Eddie Cheever and Steve Knapp took advantage of the yellow to top off on fuel, handing John Paul Jr. the lead of the race. The green came out at the halfway point, as Johnny Unser retired with a blown engine. Paul pulled a five-second lead over Davey Hamilton before pitting on Lap 113, with Robby Unser, Hamilton and Arie Luyendyk following suit. After completing his pit stop, Jack Miller stopped on Turn 2 with a battery issue, with the new caution period affording Cheever, Buddy Lazier and Knapp the opportunity to pit again.

After the Lap 128 restart, Luyendyk passed Hamilton for second, and Cheever followed suit into third. After his earlier gearbox troubles, Billy Boat finally dropped out for good on Lap 132, and Jeff Ward lost a rear wheel under caution; the wheel had been poorly attached in a previous green flag stop. The race restarted on Lap 136, with Paul Jr., Luyendyk and Cheever running close together. Paul Jr. picked up a big piece of plastic in his radiators and had a slow pit stop on Lap 147 to retrieve it, while Robby Unser overshoot his pit stall.

Luyendyk's clutch problems finally took their toll on Lap 150 as he left the pits very slowly. He had to pull off between turns 3 and 4, and the race was slowed three laps later, which left Robby Unser out of the lead lap. Out of nine caution periods until that point, six of them had been caused by cars stopped on track with mechanical issues. Paul Jr. and Hamilton had managed to not lose a lap with Cheever and led the restart order on Lap 157, although Hamilton was quickly dealt with. Paul Jr. offered more resistance until Lap 163, as he lifted off briefly due to a malfunction in the yellow flag indicator of his steering wheel. This left Buddy Lazier and Steve Knapp as the only other drivers on the lead lap, four and seven seconds back respectively.

Stéphan Grégoire brushed the wall heavily in Turn 4 with 24 laps to go, with the caution setting the stage for the end of the race. John Paul Jr.'s slim chances of winning vanished as he was unable to leave the pits, where he stayed for almost four minutes. His car stalled four times before being able to engage first gear, but he had lost three laps in the process.

All three drivers in the lead lap were now in the same strategy, with Cheever and Lazier separated by the lapped cars of Robby Unser and Jeff Ward, and four other cars between Lazier and Steve Knapp. The restart on Lap 180 was short lived, as Jack Hewitt spun the car on the outside of Turn 1, although the veteran rookie managed to employ his dirt track skills and keep the car off the wall. In the following restart, Scott Sharp lost second gear and had to retire from fifth place.

=== Finish ===
"I don't know what I'm supposed to say. [...] I had about 15 guardian angels help me today, I had five or six close calls, but I squeezed through all of them. I wasn't gonna finish second, second was not on the books today. (I was) Either gonna win, or not finish at all"

— Eddie Cheever, during ABC's victory lane interview.

With 17 laps to go, Buddy Lazier passed the remaining lapped cars on the restart and went after Cheever, being able to keep up for a few laps. Cheever eventually stretched the lead to over 3 seconds, but yet another yellow was brought out on Lap 191 due to the smoking car of Marco Greco. With five laps to go in the final restart, Lazier was nose-to-tail with Cheever, who held off the challenge as he weaved from side to side in the front straight. Cheever set off on a blistering pace and almost brushed the wall a lap later at the exit of Turn 3, but stretched out to a 3.19-second margin to grab the victory.

Cheever became the first driver to win the Indy 500 in his own car since A. J. Foyt in 1977, and the first winner since 1989 to have led the most laps. Having started 17th on the grid, his win had the lowest starting position for both Indy Car racing and the Indy 500 since Al Unser's fourth win in 1987 from 20th place. For the first time since 1982, and last as of 2024, all drivers in the top 5 hailed from the United States, with Bräck as the lone foreign driver within the top 13, and four rookies finished in the top 10 for the first time since 1965. Due to high attrition among the main favourites, none of the top 3 drivers had started in the first three rows, which also happened in the highly infamous 1973 and 1992 editions of the race.

Steve Knapp, the only other driver to finish on the lead lap in third place, won rookie of the year honours in his first Indy car race, a feat last accomplished by Lyn St. James in 1992. Kenny Bräck salvaged a sixth-place finish, and Andy Michner kept his nose clean while battling an electrical problem to cross the line eighth over J. J. Yeley. Both were scored three laps down, and neither would run the Indianapolis 500 again. Mike Groff suffered from engine misfires during the whole race in route to a 15th-place finish, in what would be his final Indy car start.

== Box score ==
Finish	Start	No	Name	Qual	Chassis	Engine	Tire	Laps	Status	Entrant
1	17	51	(United States) Eddie Cheever	217.334	Dallara IR-7	Oldsmobile	G	200	145.155 mph	Team Cheever
2	11	91	(United States) Buddy Lazier W	218.287	Dallara IR-7	Oldsmobile	G	200	+3.191	Hemelgarn Racing
3	23	55	(United States) Steve Knapp R	216.445	G-Force GF01	Oldsmobile	G	200	+6.749	ISM Racing
4	8	6	(United States) Davey Hamilton	219.748	G-Force GF01	Oldsmobile	G	199	-1 Lap	Nienhouse Motorsports
5	21	52	(United States) Robby Unser R	216.533	Dallara IR-7	Oldsmobile	G	198	-2 Laps	Team Cheever
6	3	14	(Sweden) Kenny Bräck	220.982	Dallara IR-7	Oldsmobile	G	198	-2 Laps	A. J. Foyt Enterprises
7	16	81	(United States) John Paul Jr.	217.351	Dallara IR-7	Oldsmobile	F	197	-3 Laps	Team Pelfrey
8	19	17	(United States) Andy Michner R	216.922	Dallara IR-7	Oldsmobile	G	197	-3 Laps	Chitwood Motorsports
9	13	44	(United States) J. J. Yeley R	218.045	Dallara IR-7	Oldsmobile	F	197	-3 Laps	Sinden Racing Services
10	18	12	(United States) Buzz Calkins	217.197	G-Force GF01	Oldsmobile	G	195	-5 Laps	Bradley Motorsports
11	26	7	(United States) Jimmy Kite R	219.290	Dallara IR-7	Oldsmobile	G	195	-5 Laps	Team Scandia
12	22	18	(United States) Jack Hewitt R	216.450	G-Force GF01	Oldsmobile	G	195	-5 Laps	PDM Racing
13	27	35	(United States) Jeff Ward	219.086	G-Force GF01	Oldsmobile	G	194	-6 Laps	ISM Racing
14	14	16	(Brazil) Marco Greco	217.953	G-Force GF01	Oldsmobile	F	183	Engine	Phoenix Racing
15	32	10	(United States) Mike Groff	216.704	G-Force GF01	Oldsmobile	F	183	Running	Jonathan Byrd/Cunningham Racing
16	7	8	(United States) Scott Sharp	219.911	Dallara IR-7	Oldsmobile	G	181	Gearbox	Kelley Racing
17	31	77	(France) Stéphan Grégoire	217.036	G-Force GF01	Oldsmobile	G	172	-28 Laps	Chastain Motorsports
18	2	97	(United States) Greg Ray	221.125	Dallara IR-7	Oldsmobile	F	167	Gearbox	Knapp Motorsports
19	30	30	(Brazil) Raul Boesel	217.303	G-Force GF01	Oldsmobile	G	164	-36 Laps	McCormack Motorsports
20	28	5	(Netherlands) Arie Luyendyk W	218.935	G-Force GF01	Oldsmobile	F	151	Gearbox	Treadway Racing
21	15	40	(United States) Dr. Jack Miller	217.800	Dallara IR-7	Infiniti	F	128	-72 Laps	Sinden Racing Services
22	9	21	(Colombia) Roberto Guerrero	218.900	Dallara IR-7	Oldsmobile	G	125	-75 Laps	Pagan Racing
23	1	11	(United States) Billy Boat	223.503	Dallara IR-7	Oldsmobile	G	111	Drive Line	A. J. Foyt Enterprises
24	10	4	(Canada) Scott Goodyear	218.357	G-Force GF01	Oldsmobile	G	100	Clutch	Panther Racing
25	25	9	(United States) Johnny Unser	216.316	Dallara IR-7	Oldsmobile	G	98	Engine	Hemelgarn Racing
26	6	99	(United States) Sam Schmidt	219.981	Dallara IR-7	Oldsmobile	F	48	Accident	LP Racing
27	12	28	(United States) Mark Dismore	218.096	Dallara IR-7	Oldsmobile	G	48	Accident	Kelley Racing
28	29	19	(United States) Stan Wattles R	217.477	Riley & Scott MkV	Oldsmobile	G	48	Accident	Metro Racing
29	20	53	(United States) Jim Guthrie	216.604	G-Force GF01	Oldsmobile	G	48	Accident	ISM Racing
30	33	33	(United States) Billy Roe	217.834	Dallara IR-7	Oldsmobile	G	48	Accident	Team Scandia
31	5	3	(United States) Robbie Buhl	220.236	Dallara IR-7	Oldsmobile	F	44	Engine	Team Menard
32	24	98	(United States) Donnie Beechler R	216.357	G-Force GF01	Oldsmobile	F	34	Engine	Cahill Racing
33	4	1	(United States) Tony Stewart	220.386	Dallara IR-7	Oldsmobile	F	22	Engine	Team Menard

W Former Indianapolis 500 winner

R Indianapolis 500 Rookie

=== Race statistics ===
Lap Leaders
Laps	Leader
1–12	Billy Boat
13–20	Greg Ray
21	Tony Stewart
22–31	Greg Ray
32–46	Kenny Bräck
47–50	Buzz Calkins
51–61	Buddy Lazier
62–67	Kenny Bräck
68–84	Eddie Cheever
85	Arie Luyendyk
86–87	Kenny Bräck
88–93	Buddy Lazier
94–97	Eddie Cheever
98–113	John Paul Jr.
114–116	Davey Hamilton
117–122	Eddie Cheever
123	Buddy Lazier
124–146	John Paul Jr.
147–149	Arie Luyendyk
150–153	Eddie Cheever
154	Buddy Lazier
155–176	Eddie Cheever
177	Buddy Lazier
178–200	Eddie Cheever

Total laps led
Driver	Laps
Eddie Cheever	76
John Paul Jr.	39
Kenny Bräck	23
Buddy Lazier	20
Greg Ray	18
Billy Boat	12
Buzz Calkins	4
Arie Luyendyk	4
Davey Hamilton	3
Tony Stewart	1

Cautions: 12 for 61 laps
Laps	Reason
1–3	J. J. Yeley spin in turn 1
22–26	Tony Stewart stalled on track
34–38	Donnie Beechler blown engine
45–48	Robbie Buhl stalled on track
49–63	Roe, Guthrie, Wattles, Dismore, Schmidt crash in turn 3
96–99	Jimmy Kite stalled on track
122–127	Jack Miller stalled on track
132–135	Billy Boat stalled on track
153–156	Arie Luyendyk stalled on track
176–179	Stéphan Grégoire brushed wall in turn 4
180–182	Jack Hewitt spun in turn 1
191–194	Marco Greco blown engine

Tire participation chart
Supplier	No. of starters
Goodyear	22*
Firestone	11
* - Denotes race winner

== Broadcasting ==
=== Radio ===
The race was carried live on the Indy Racing Radio Network. The network, previously known as the Indianapolis Motor Speedway Radio Network, had changed its name for 1998, to reflect its coverage of the entire Indy Racing League season. At least 541 affiliates carried the broadcast across the United States.

Bob Jenkins served as chief announcer for the ninth and final year. Overall it would be the 20th and final year for Jenkins on the radio network crew (except for a brief stint as a turn reporter in 2007–2008). In addition, Jerry Baker celebrated his milestone 25th year on the broadcast.

Johnny Rutherford served as "driver expert". WTHR sports director and Speedway public address announcer Dave Calabro joined the crew as a pit reporter, his lone radio network appearance. This was also Gary Lee's final year on the radio network.

Indy Racing Radio Network
Booth Announcers	Turn Reporters	Pit/garage reporters
Chief Announcer: Bob Jenkins; Driver expert: Johnny Rutherford; Statistician: Howdy Bell; Historian: Donald Davidson; Commentary: Chris Economaki	Turn 1: Jerry Baker; Turn 2: Ken Double; Turn 3: Gary Lee; Turn 4: Bob Lamey	Mark Jaynes (north pits); Dave Calabro (center pits); Vince Welch (south pits); Chuck Marlowe (garages)

=== Television ===
The race was carried live flag-to-flag coverage in the United States on ABC Sports. Paul Page served as host and play-by-play announcer with Tom Sneva as analyst. Longtime color commentator Bobby Unser left ABC, while Danny Sullivan was reassigned to cover CART races exclusively and would no longer be with the broadcast. This would be Page's final 500 for the next three years. After the 1998 season, Page would move exclusively to CART series broadcasts while being replaced in 1999 by soon to be former voice of the 500 Bob Jenkins.

For the first time since the early 1980s, one of the pit reporters (Gary Gerould) rode in the pace car, reporting live at the start of the race. During the broadcast itself, Brent Musburger had a small role as Wide World of Sports studio host.

At the track itself, the Speedway broadcast the race live on a special targeted signal, intended to be picked up by television sets within the radius of the grounds. This was the first and only time this special signal has been used.

ABC Television
Booth Announcers	Pit/garage reporters
Host/Announcer: Paul Page; Color: Tom Sneva	Jack Arute; Gary Gerould; Dr. Jerry Punch

Practice and time trials were carried over three networks: ABC, ESPN, and ESPN2.

- Live Daily Reports (ESPN2): Paul Page, Jon Beekhuis, Jerry Punch, Jack Arute, Gary Gerould
- Time trials (ABC): Paul Page, Tom Sneva, Jack Arute, Gary Gerould, Brent Musberger (studio host)
- Time trials (ESPN/ESPN2): Paul Page, Jon Beekhuis, Jerry Punch, Gary Gerould

== Gallery ==
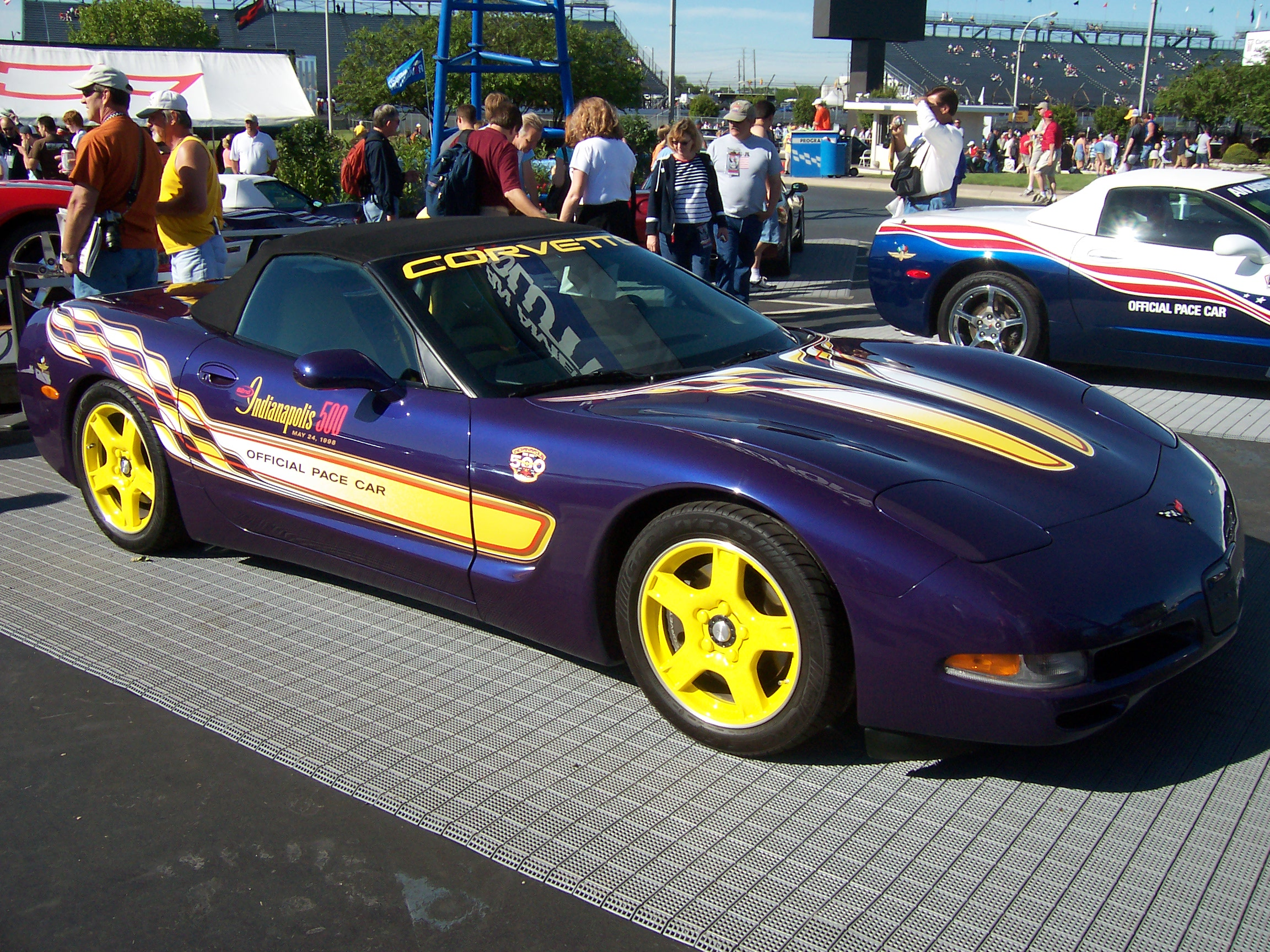
1998 Chevrolet Corvette pace car

== Notes ==
=== Works cited ===
- 1998 Indianapolis 500 Daily Trackside Report for the Media
- Indianapolis 500 History: Race & All-Time Stats - Official Site
- 1998 Indianapolis 500 Radio Broadcast, Indianapolis Motor Speedway Radio Network

Previous race: 1998 Dura Lube 200	Indy Racing League; 1998 season	Next race: 1998 True Value 500
Previous race: 1997 Indianapolis 500	Indianapolis 500	Next race: 1999 Indianapolis 500
