= 1997 Indy 200 at Walt Disney World =

Motor race held in Bay Lake, Florida

(United States) 1997 Indy 200 at Walt Disney World
Race details
- Race 3 of 10 in the 1996–1997 Indy Racing League season
- Date: January 25, 1997
- Official name: Indy 200 at Walt Disney World Presented by Aurora
- Location: Walt Disney World Speedway, Bay Lake, Florida
- Course: Permanent racing facility 1.000 mi / 1.609 km
- Distance: 149 laps 149.000 mi / 239.792 km
- Scheduled Distance: 200 laps 200.000 mi / 321.869 km
- Weather: Mixture of dry weather and rain; temperatures reaching up to 75.2 °F (24.0 °C) along with wind speeds reaching up to 20 miles per hour (32 km/h)

Pole position
- Driver: (United States) Tony Stewart (Team Menard)
- Time: 21.685

Fastest lap
- Driver: (United States) Tony Stewart (Team Menard)
- Time: 22.579 (on lap 5 of 149)

Podium
- First: (United States) Eddie Cheever (Team Cheever)
- Second: (United States) Mike Groff (Byrd-Cunningham Racing)
- Third: (Canada) Scott Goodyear (Treadway Racing)

The 1997 Indy 200 at Walt Disney World Presented by Aurora was an open-wheel car race that was sanctioned by the United States Auto Club (USAC) and held on January 25, 1997, at Walt Disney World Speedway in Bay Lake, Florida before 54,000 spectators. It was the third of 10 rounds in the 1996–97 Indy Racing League season and the second running of the event. Cheever Racing's Eddie Cheever won the 149-lap race, shortened from the scheduled 200-lap distance due to rain, with Byrd-Cunningham Racing driver Mike Groff finishing second and Scott Goodyear coming in third for Treadway Racing.

Groff led the Drivers' Championship standings entering the race, which brought about the debut of the Indy Racing League's new car specifications that introduced normally aspirated engines as a replacement for the turbocharged engines in order to reduce the costs and speeds of the series. Tony Stewart was a clear favorite to win the race, having lapped quick speeds in preseason testing and practice sessions and earning the pole position by recording the fastest lap time of qualifying. After leading the first 130 laps, he gave up the lead to Buzz Calkins during a pit stop. He reclaimed the position 15 laps later when Calkins retired from the race with an engine failure, but spun on his own oil that leaked from his car, giving Cheever the top position. Once a large downpour developed over the track, the race was declared official, with Cheever earning his first career win.

The result meant that Groff widened his advantage over second-place Calkins in the Drivers' Championship, while Scott Sharp, Davey Hamilton, and Marco Greco were promoted by three positions to round out the top-five in the standings with seven races left in the season.

== Background ==
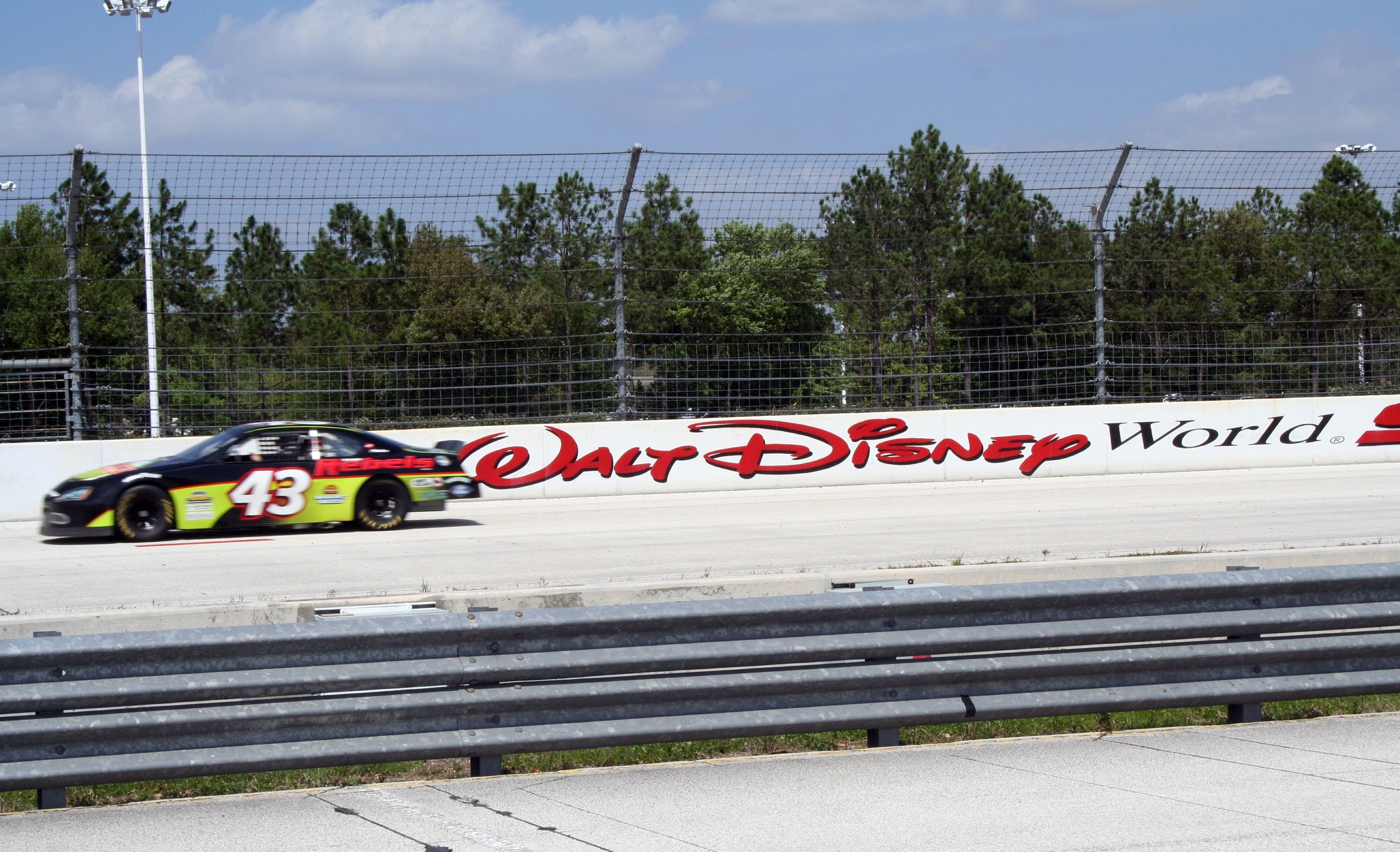
Walt Disney World Speedway (pictured in 2008), where the race was held.

The second annual edition of the Indy 200 at Walt Disney World was the third of 10 rounds in the Indy Racing League (IRL)'s 1996–97 season and was held on Saturday, January 25, 1997, making it the first race of the season to be held in the calendar year of 1997. It was the only time in the event's history that it did not act as the IRL's season opener. As it had the previous year, the event took place at Walt Disney World Speedway, a 1 mi (1.6 km) tri-oval track with varied amounts of banking in each of its three turns (10 degrees in turn one, 8.5 in turn two, and seven in turn three), in Bay Lake, Florida, United States. Buzz Calkins was the defending race winner. Heading into the race, Mike Groff led the Drivers' Championship with 63 points. Calkins and Michele Alboreto shared the second position, as they were tied on 62 points each. Roberto Guerrero and Richie Hearn rounded out the top-five in the standings, with 60 and 59 points, respectively.

The biggest uncertainty entering the race were the introduction of the IRL's car specifications. Their new engine formula replaced 2.65 L (0.70 U.S. gal) turbocharged engines used in 1996 with 4.0 L (1.1 U.S. gal) normally aspirated V8 engines – the Oldsmobile Aurora and the Nissan Infiniti Indy – in order to reduce costs and speeds. To accommodate the engines, the series' two chassis suppliers (Dallara and G-Force) constructed new cars that featured an airbox above and behind the drivers' cockpits to force air into the engine compartment. Riley & Scott also announced their intentions to field an IRL chassis, though their commitment to Oldsmobile in IMSA prevented them from doing so until the True Value 500 in June 1997. The G-Force chassis and Aurora engine debuted at Phoenix International Raceway in November 1996, with Arie Luyendyk setting speeds at around 162 mph (261 km/h) in a two-day test. Later that month, Eliseo Salazar completed a test for the new Dallara chassis at Walt Disney World Speedway, recording top lap speeds of 157 mph (253 km/h).

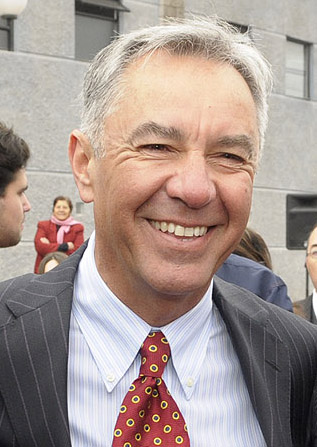
Eliseo Salazar (pictured in 2011) suffered injuries to his back during preseason testing.

The first open test at Walt Disney World Speedway was conducted on December 10–13, but Oldsmobile's engine production had been scarce, and Infiniti was not ready yet to supply theirs. Due to this, Luyendyk, Tony Stewart, and Scott Sharp were the only three participants of the test. Following several additional tests at the track with Salazar, John Paul Jr., Scott Goodyear, Calkins, and Eddie Cheever, the pre-holiday testing period concluded with Goodyear lapping the fastest overall speed of 168.145 mph (270.603 km/h) on December 23. During the second series of tests at Walt Disney World Speedway on January 6–22, 1997, the Infiniti engine made its belated first appearance in Groff's car, and Stewart logged the quickest speed among the 10 participating drivers at 169.795 mph (273.259 km/h). However, the tests were marred by a crash on January 11 involving Salazar, who suffered a compression fracture in his lower back after slipping on oil that leaked from his engine and slamming the wall in turn one. According to IRL medical director Dr. Henry Bock, he would not be able to return to racing "at least until the beginning of May".

The tentative entry list was revealed on January 21 with 23 cars, but only 19 of the entries materialized after Mark Dismore, Robbie Buhl, Sam Schmidt, and Johnny Unser withdrew because of the engine shortage. The 19 drivers represented 16 different teams and drove a Dallara IR-7, G-Force GF01, or Reynard 95I car that were powered by an Oldsmobile, Infiniti, or Ford engine and used Firestone or Goodyear tires. Scott Goodyear, a regular in the rivaling PPG CART World Series, diverted to the IRL and teamed with Luyendyk at Treadway Racing. Veteran racer Danny Ongais partnered with the newly-formed Chitwood Motorsports team in what wound up being the final start of his Indy car racing career. Other new driver–team combinations include Davy Jones and Galles Racing, Jeret Schroeder and McCormack Motorsports, and Stéphan Grégoire and Chastain Motorsports. A notable absentee was Hearn, winner of the preceding Las Vegas 500K in October 1996, who switched to the CART World Series with Della Penna Motorsports.

== Practice and qualifying ==
Four practice sessions preceded the race on Saturday, two on Thursday and two on Friday. The first session lasted 120 minutes, the second session 45 minutes, the third session 90 minutes, and the fourth session 30 minutes. Stewart set the fastest two lap times of the first practice session on Thursday morning in his primary car (21.465 seconds) and his backup car (21.610 seconds), outpacing Jones, Goodyear, Luyendyk, and Calkins. One hour and eight minutes into the session, Jones spun into the outside wall in turn three with the rear end of his car before backing into the inside wall on the front stretch and stopping in the infield grass. An unconscious Jones was transported by helicopter to the Orlando Regional Medical Center in critical condition before being upgraded to serious condition upon regaining consciousness.

Later that afternoon, Stewart topped the time charts of the second practice session at 21.721 seconds, with Calkins in second, Buddy Lazier in third, Goodyear in fourth, and Luyendyk in fifth. Stewart continued showcasing his speed the next morning by posting the fastest lap time of the third practice session at 21.551 seconds, besting Sharp, Cheever, Goodyear, and Luyendyk. Prior to the session, Galles Racing named Jeff Ward as their replacement driver for Jones, who was diagnosed with head and neck injuries and experienced weakness in his left arm.

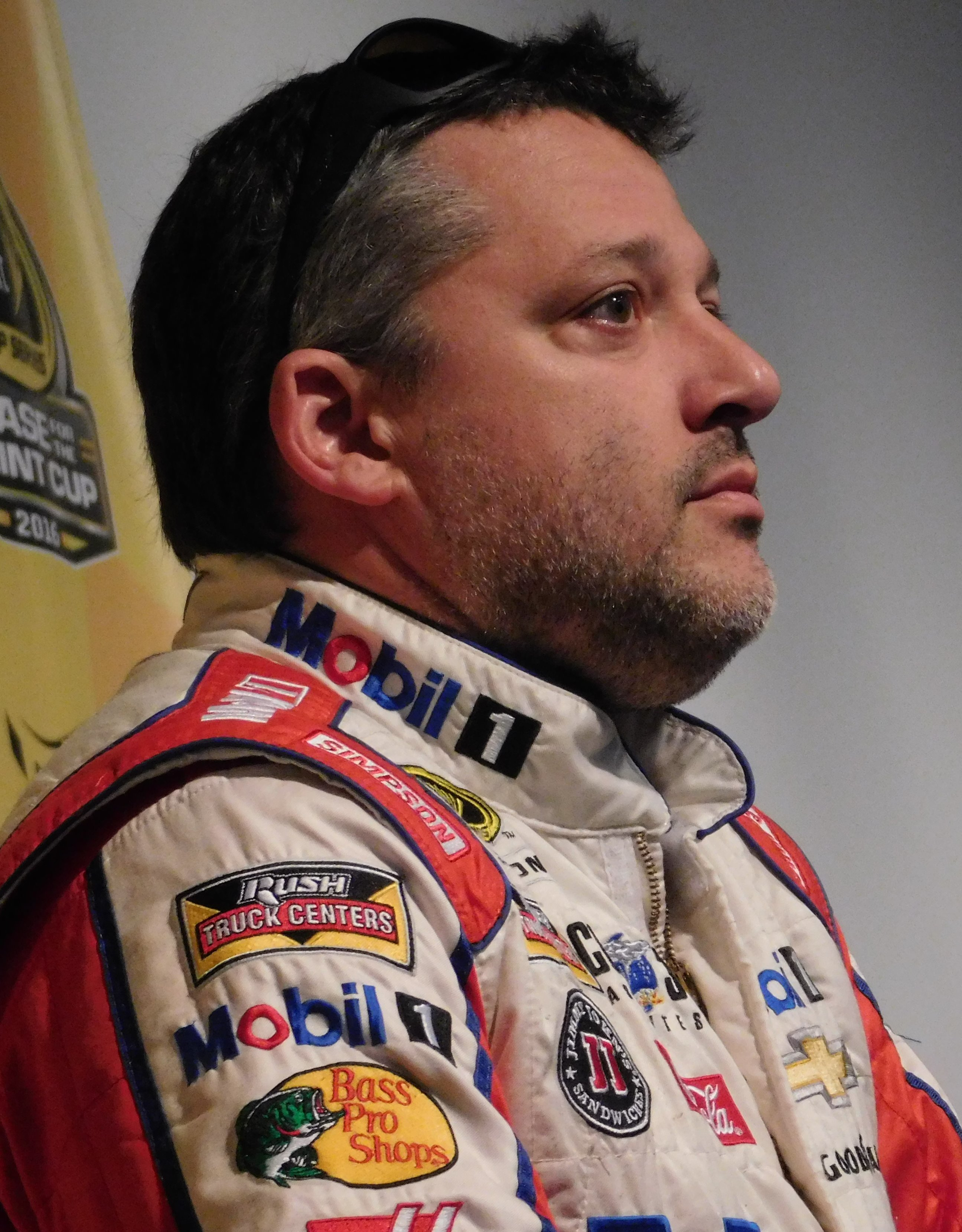
Tony Stewart (pictured in 2016) earned his second career pole position.

The qualifying session began 75 minutes after the third practice session ended. Each driver was required to complete two timed laps, with the fastest of the two determining their starting position. Stewart took the pole position, the second of his career, with a time of 21.685 seconds, beating second-place qualifier Luyendyk by 0.138 seconds. After qualifying, Stewart considered it his first pole because he had only inherited the pole position in the 1996 Indianapolis 500 after his teammate, Scott Brayton, was killed in a practice crash. He also described the new cars as "a little more forgiving than last year's". Calkins started in third despite fuel pressure issues earlier in the day, Sharp was fourth, and Cheever fifth, followed by Goodyear, Davey Hamilton, Ward, Jim Guthrie, and Fermín Vélez. Lazier only took 11th after suffering a gearbox failure in morning practice; the five drivers behind him were Marco Greco, Paul, Groff, Schroeder, and Ongais.

Three drivers did not take part in qualifying: Roberto Guerrero had been waiting for a new Infiniti engine since his old engine failed during a test on Wednesday, while Jack Miller and Grégoire were off the pace in the morning practice session. Guerrero and Miller were permitted to start the race in 17th and 18th, respectively, but they and Grégoire were required to complete laps in a 30-minute systems check practice session beginning at 9:00 a.m. Eastern Standard Time (UTC−05:00) on Saturday in order to demonstrate enough speed to qualify for the race. By recorded a lap time of 21.638 seconds on Friday afternoon, Stewart led all practice sessions of the weekend, with Lazier, Sharp, Paul, and Ward rounding out the top-five. Vélez suffered an engine failure during the final practice session and replaced it with an Oldsmobile development engine, thus forcing him to partake in the systems check session the next morning.

=== Qualifying classification ===
Final qualifying results
| Pos | No. | Driver | Team | Time | Speed | Grid |
|---|---|---|---|---|---|---|
| 1 | 2 | (United States) Tony Stewart | Team Menard | 21.685 | 166.013 | 1 |
| 2 | 5 | (Netherlands) Arie Luyendyk | Treadway Racing | 21.823 | 164.964 | 2 |
| 3 | 12 | (United States) Buzz Calkins | Bradley Motorsports | 21.945 | 164.046 | 3 |
| 4 | 1 | (United States) Scott Sharp | A. J. Foyt Enterprises | 21.980 | 163.785 | 4 |
| 5 | 51 | (United States) Eddie Cheever | Team Cheever | 22.012 | 163.547 | 5 |
| 6 | 6 | (Canada) Scott Goodyear | Treadway Racing | 22.041 | 163.332 | 6 |
| 7 | 14 | (United States) Davey Hamilton | A. J. Foyt Enterprises | 22.048 | 163.280 | 7 |
| 8 | 4 | (United States) Jeff Ward | Galles Racing | 22.132 | 162.660 | 8 |
| 9 | 27 | (United States) Jim Guthrie | Blueprint Racing | 22.185 | 162.272 | 9 |
| 10 | 33 | (Spain) Fermín Vélez | Team Scandia | 22.272 | 161.638 | 10 |
| 11 | 91 | (United States) Buddy Lazier | Hemelgarn Racing | 22.313 | 161.341 | 11 |
| 12 | 22 | (Brazil) Marco Greco | Team Scandia | 22.470 | 160.214 | 12 |
| 13 | 18 | (United States) John Paul Jr. | PDM Racing | 22.563 | 159.553 | 13 |
| 14 | 10 | (United States) Mike Groff | Byrd-Cunningham Racing | 22.591 | 159.355 | 14 |
| 15 | 30 | (United States) Jeret Schroeder | McCormack Motorsports | 23.247 | 154.859 | 15 |
| 16 | 17 | (United States) Danny Ongais | Chitwood Motorsports | 23.765 | 151.483 | 16 |
| 17 | 21 | (Colombia) Roberto Guerrero | Pagan Racing | No time | No speed | 17 |
| 18 | 40 | (United States) Jack Miller | Arizona Motorsports | No time | No speed | 18 |
| 19 | 77 | (France) Stéphan Grégoire | Chastain Motorsports | No time | No speed | 19 |

== Race ==
Prior to the race, which had a scheduled distance of 200 laps and 200 miles (320 km), rain showers forced United States Auto Club (USAC) officials to delay the start of the systems-check session to 11:09 a.m. All four participants were allowed to start the race, with Grégoire inheriting the 19th and final position on the starting grid. Goodyear tire engineers measured the track surface's temperature at 85 °F (29 °C). An estimated 54,000 spectators attended the race. Following an invocation from IRL chaplain Mark Wingler, the command to fire the cars' engines was given by Judson Green, president of Walt Disney Attractions. The race began at 12:40 p.m. and Stewart immediately pulled clear of Luyendyk to lead the first lap. By the end of the second lap, Ward improved to fifth place and Cheever fell to the seventh position. The following lap, Grégoire pulled into pit road and retired from the race with a fuel pump issue.

As Stewart began to amass a 6.9-second lead, Luyendyk was being pressured for second place by Calkins, who eventually got around Luyendyk on the 15th lap. Two laps later, Miller made a pit stop for fresh tires and fuel after slowing his pace. On the 32nd lap, Sharp – battling an ill-handling car – nearly lost control at the first turn, forcing Ward to veer left to avoid a collision and demoting him by three positions. This allowed Stewart to lap everyone up to third-placed Luyendyk by the 35th lap. After Sharp fell to eighth place behind Lazier and Ward, he pitted on lap 45, earlier than his team had expected. Meanwhile, smoke began expelling from the rear of Calkins' car on the 41st lap, and 18 laps later, he was issued a black flag to come into pit road. Stewart made his first pit stop on the 62nd lap, but was so far ahead of his competitors that he continued holding the lead.

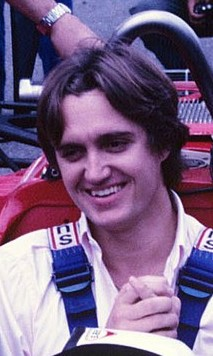
Eddie Cheever (pictured in 1986) earned his maiden Indy car racing win.

After the first cycle of green-flag pit stops concluded, more drivers were taken out of the race with mechanical issues: on lap 65, Ward lost power on the front stretch and his team removed his cowling once he drove to his pit stall, signaling the end of his race, while Calkins' engine issues were exacerbated as his car slowed dramatically on the back stretch before picking up speed again on the 82nd lap. Luyendyk resultantly assumed the second position a lap later, but Stewart now had a full lap advantage over the rest of the field. On lap 93, Miller slid sideways on the front stretch but corrected his car to continue without necessitating a caution flag. He entered pit road four laps later, out with an oil pressure issue. On the 99th lap, Schroeder oversteered and spun at the exit of turn one. In an attempt to dodge the incident, Luyendyk slid into the inside armco barrier, ending both drivers' races.

The accident prompted the first caution flag of the race. With rain seemingly looming near the track, most drivers elected to pit earlier than intended, with the exception of Stewart, Greco, and Guthrie, all of whom stuck to a two-stop strategy. Stewart led the field back up to speed at the restart on lap 106, followed by Calkins, Cheever, Lazier, and Greco. Stewart made his second stop on the 130th lap, but rejoined the race 12.4 seconds behind Calkins. He then lost second place to Cheever on lap 133 before reclaiming the position in the first turn 10 laps later. On the 145th lap, race leader Calkins blew his engine and limped to pit road with smoke billowing from his car, forcing him to retire. Stewart thus regained the lead, but as he approached turn three, his oil line broke, which caused the rear of his car to contact the outside wall before spinning down the front stretch. The second caution flag was thrown as a result of the spin on lap 146.

Due to Calkins and Stewart's misfortunes, Cheever inherited a full-lap lead over Groff. He made a pit stop on the 148th lap before a sudden downpour fell over the track, forcing USAC officials to issue the red flag to stop the race on lap 149. Several minutes later, the rain persisted, and the race was deemed official 51 laps short of its scheduled distance. Cheever was declared the winner, securing his first Indy car racing victory in his 87th start and his first motor racing win since the 1988 1000 km of Fuji. He completed the race's 149 laps in 1 hour, six minutes, and 43.145 seconds, with an average speed of 133.995 mph (215.644 km/h). It was the first win for an owner–driver in Indy car racing since A. J. Foyt in the 1981 Pocono 500. Groff finished in second, Goodyear third, Sharp fourth, and Lazier fifth. The remaining classified finishers were Guthrie, Hamilton, Greco, and Vélez. The attrition rate was high, as 10 of the 19 drivers failed to finish the race. The race set several IRL records for the fewest drivers to lead at least one lap (3), fewest caution flags (2), and the most cars to finish on the lead lap (5).

=== Post-race ===
"I don't know what the hell it is going to take for us to ever get a break."

— Larry Curry, manager of Team Menard, speaking of Stewart's crash after the race.

Cheever, who earned $170,000 from his victory, celebrated in victory lane after taking shelter from the downpour in a skybox. He expressed pride in his team for helping him throughout the race, which he said was "one of the most enjoyable races I've ever had. Not worrying about the turbo was great." In addition, he explained how he avoided hitting the spinning Stewart: "I saw Tony come out of the pits and he was in the wrong sequence. Then I saw him out of Turn 2 and there was smoke coming off his tires. Then I saw him sideways and went on by." Second-place finisher Groff, who earned his third (and final) podium finish, was pleased with the performance of his Nissan Infiniti engine: "This engine is really just 17 days old today, in terms of being on the race track. And we've run on the track on very few of those days. We've run very few miles, but the engine was very reliable." Goodyear, who came in third, believed that his finish was not "on our terms" because of his team's lack of testing compared to Team Menard.

Despite having led at least one lap in five of the IRL's six races to that point, Stewart had not won any of them. He bluntly stated: "We crashed. We had an oil leak and dumped out oil on the right rear tire." However, he still held a positive outlook for his team, which he felt was "one of the best teams in the IRL, if not the best team. The preparation they go through on these cars before the race and before practice and testing is unmatched right now." A despondent John Menard Jr., owner of Team Menard, was not as positive, stating: "Standing here in the pouring rain is adding insult to injury. That is how it goes. It's racing and it is raining on everybody. We will get them in Phoenix." Calkins said of his mechanical issues during the race: "About 60 laps into it, the oil pressure started fluctuating. It finally put a baseball-sized hole through the (engine) block."

Tony George, founder of the IRL, was "ecstatic" about the durability of the IRL's new cars: "The cars held together very well and the field was able to put on a good race. We had some problems with oil lines breaking and other non-engine related parts, but the engines seemed to hold together, especially when the first part of the race went green for so long." The race and the new car regulations brought about mixed reactions from the media. Ned Wicker of the Indy Car Racing Magazine felt that the race was not great, but admitted that he liked the new cars because "with its own equipment, the IRL takes on its own identity and it's time to dig in and work on developing a competitive series." Motorsport.com writer Len Ashburn opined that the race was "full of action and suspense" and "well managed by the IRL and USAC". Conversely, Joseph Siano of The New York Times wrote of a race that was "relatively free of excitement until the last five laps", and Norris McDonald of The Globe and Mail said that the race was "good entertainment", but argued that the IRL was for "washed-up or never-good-enough CART drivers; for ride-buyers no longer welcome in CART; and for guys who would never make it to CART in a million years."

Concerns were also raised over the weight of the IRL cars' rear ends, as Salazar and Jones were both injured after hitting the wall rear-first. In response, Emco – the manufacturer of the cars' gearboxes – agreed to lighten their weight by 10 pounds (4.5 kg), and the IRL mandated that all teams place an attenuator behind their cars' gearboxes to dissipate the force of a rear-first crash. Salazar eventually recovered in time to compete in the 1997 Indianapolis 500, while Jones, diagnosed with head and neck injuries, was listed in fair condition on January 30 and transferred to the Rehabilitation Hospital of Indiana for further treatment eight days later. He briefly retired from motor racing before making a return in the 1999 12 Hours of Sebring American Le Mans Series race. The following year, he attempted to qualify for the Indianapolis 500 for the last time in his career but failed to do so, bringing an end to his IRL career.

The final result allowed Groff, with 96 points, to extend his Drivers' Championship lead to 10 points over Calkins. Sharp, on 85 points, was promoted to third place, while Hamilton (82 points) and Greco (81 points) improved to fourth and fifth place, respectively, with seven races remaining in the season.

=== Race classification ===
Final race results
| Pos | No. | Driver | Team | Laps | Time/Retired | Grid | Points |
|---|---|---|---|---|---|---|---|
| 1 | 51 | (United States) Eddie Cheever | Team Cheever | 149 | 1:06:43.145 | 5 | 35 |
| 2 | 10 | (United States) Mike Groff | Byrd-Cunningham Racing | 149 | +51.278 | 14 | 33 |
| 3 | 6 | (Canada) Scott Goodyear | Treadway Racing | 149 | +54.803 | 6 | 32 |
| 4 | 1 | (United States) Scott Sharp | A. J. Foyt Enterprises | 149 | +55.506 | 4 | 31 |
| 5 | 91 | (United States) Buddy Lazier | Hemelgarn Racing | 149 | +56.162 | 11 | 30 |
| 6 | 27 | (United States) Jim Guthrie | Blueprint Racing | 148 | +1 Lap | 9 | 29 |
| 7 | 14 | (United States) Davey Hamilton | A. J. Foyt Enterprises | 148 | +1 Lap | 7 | 28 |
| 8 | 22 | (Brazil) Marco Greco | Team Scandia | 147 | +2 Laps | 12 | 27 |
| 9 | 33 | (Spain) Fermín Vélez | Team Scandia | 147 | +2 Laps | 10 | 26 |
| 10 | 2 | (United States) Tony Stewart | Team Menard | 146 | Accident | 1 | 28^{1}^{2} |
| 11 | 12 | (United States) Buzz Calkins | Bradley Motorsports | 144 | Engine | 3 | 24 |
| 12 | 5 | (Netherlands) Arie Luyendyk | Treadway Racing | 97 | Accident | 2 | 23 |
| 13 | 17 | (United States) Danny Ongais | Chitwood Motorsports | 94 | Suspension | 16 | 22 |
| 14 | 30 | (United States) Jeret Schroeder | McCormack Motorsports | 93 | Accident | 15 | 21 |
| 15 | 40 | (United States) Jack Miller | Arizona Motorsports | 85 | Suspension | 18 | 20 |
| 16 | 4 | (United States) Jeff Ward | Galles Racing | 63 | Gearbox | 8 | 19 |
| 17 | 21 | (Colombia) Roberto Guerrero | Pagan Racing | 56 | Fuel pump | 17 | 18 |
| 18 | 18 | (United States) John Paul Jr. | PDM Racing | 46 | Oil pump | 13 | 17 |
| 19 | 77 | (France) Stéphan Grégoire | Chastain Motorsports | 2 | Fuel pump | 19 | 16 |

Notes

- ^1 – Includes two bonus points for earning the pole position.
- ^2 – Includes one bonus point for leading the most laps.

== Championship standings after the race ==
Drivers' Championship standings
| +/– | Pos | Driver | Points |
|---|---|---|---|
| Unchanged | 1 | (United States) Mike Groff | 96 |
| Unchanged | 2 | (United States) Buzz Calkins | 86 (–10) |
| 3 | 3 | (United States) Scott Sharp | 85 (–11) |
| 3 | 4 | (United States) Davey Hamilton | 82 (–14) |
| 3 | 5 | (Brazil) Marco Greco | 81 (–15) |

- Note: Only the top five positions are included.
