= 1996–97 Indy Racing League =

American auto racing season

1996–97 Indy Racing League season
- Indy Racing League
- 1996–97 Indy Racing League

Season
- Races: 10
- Start date: August 18, 1996
- End date: October 11, 1997

Awards
- Drivers' champion: (United States) Tony Stewart
- Manufacturers' Cup: (United States) Oldsmobile
- Rookie of the Year: (United States) Jim Guthrie
- Indianapolis 500 winner: (Netherlands) Arie Luyendyk

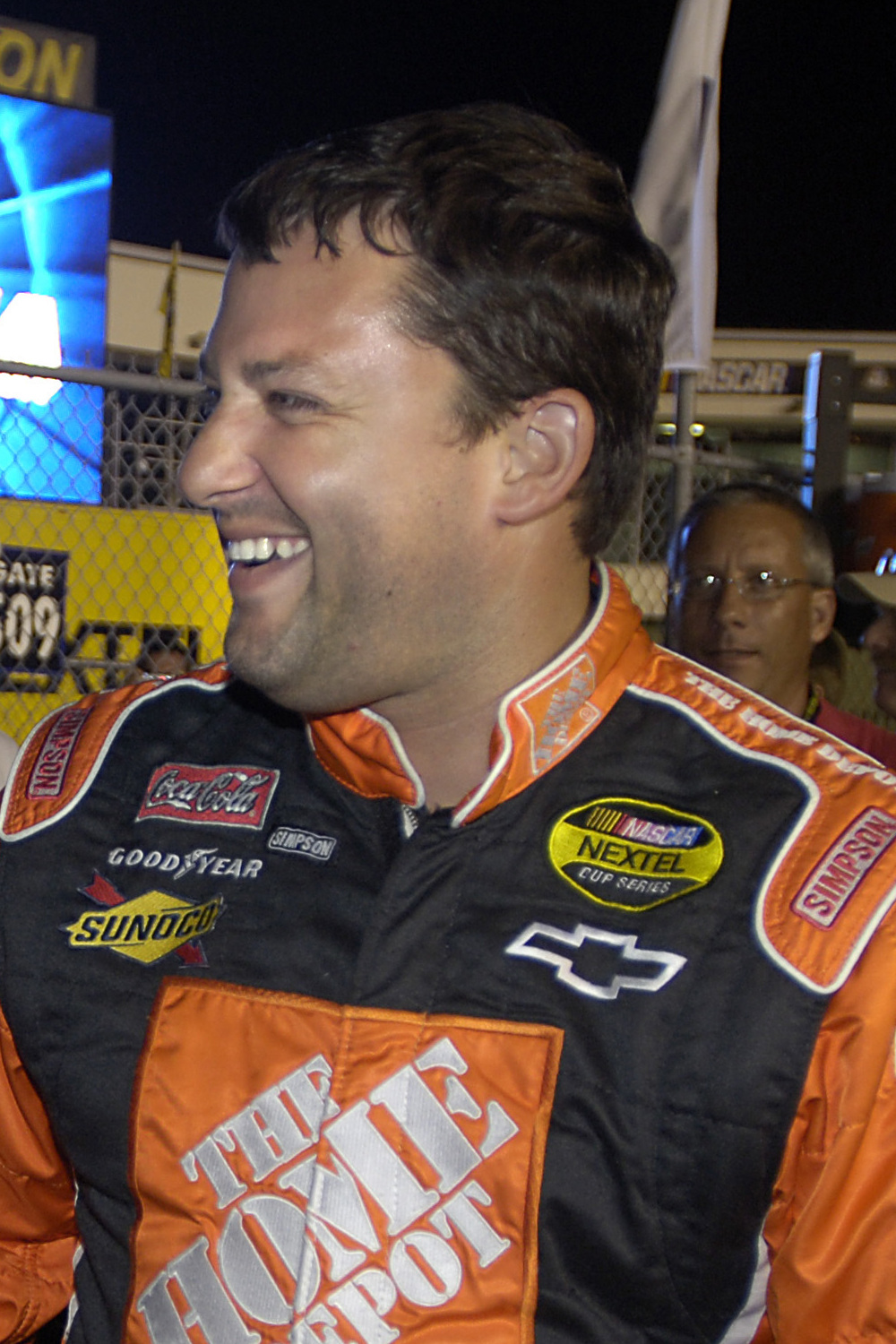
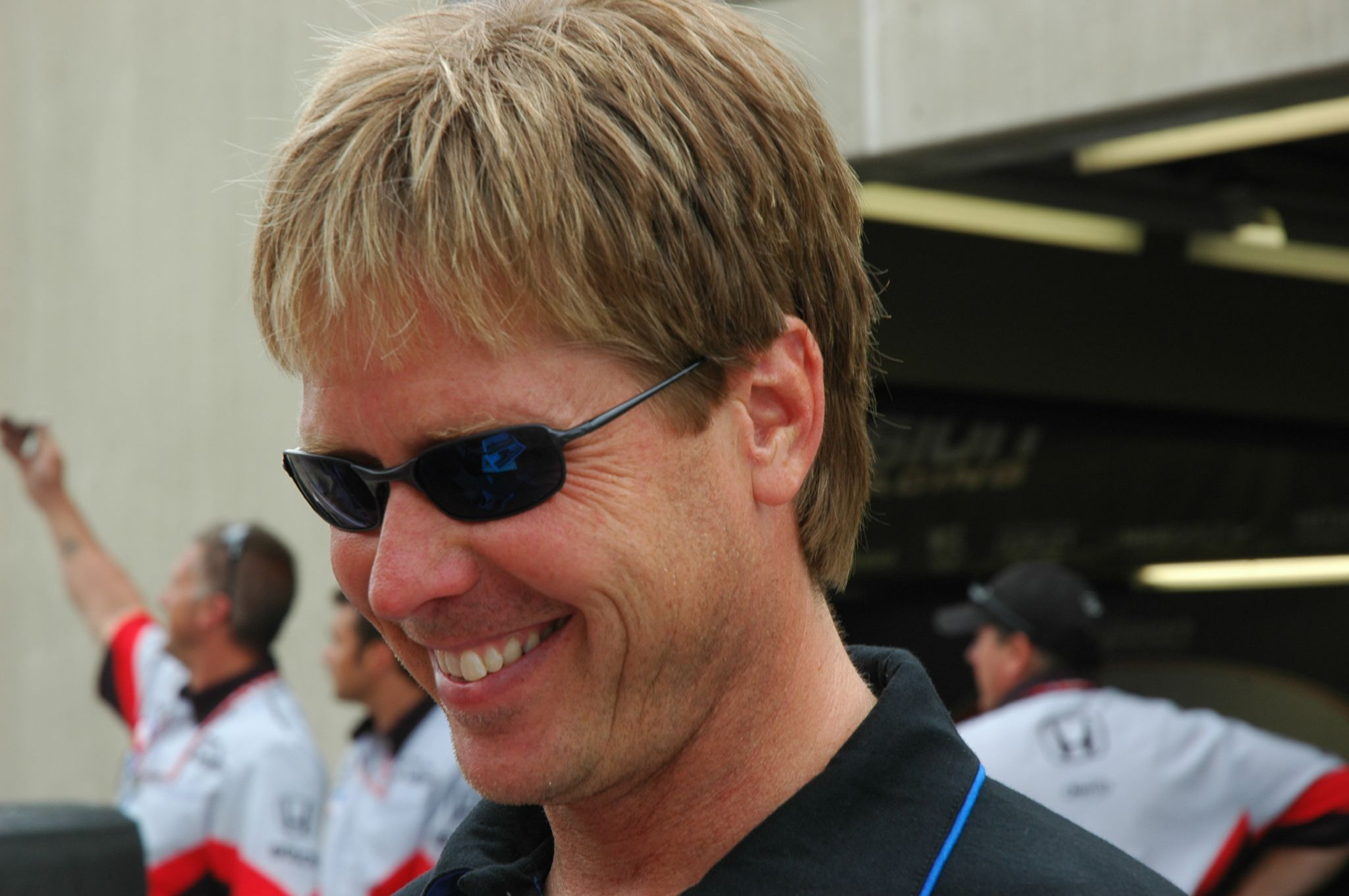
Tony Stewart (left) won his first and only Drivers' Championship while Davey Hamilton (right) finished second in the championship.

The 1996–97 Indy Racing League was the second season contested by the Indy Racing League. Tony Stewart was the champion, while Arie Luyendyk won the Indianapolis 500. The lengthy season was a result of the league abandoning the concept of ending each season with the Indianapolis 500. The 1996–97 season would ultimately consist of the two races that followed the Indy 500 in the calendar year of 1996, and all events contested in the calendar year of 1997. It also saw the introduction of a new chassis and engine package effective from January 1.

The 1996–97 season was originally scheduled to begin at New Hampshire in August 1996 and end with the Indianapolis 500 in May 1997. At some point in the summer of 1996, the consensus regarding the unusual split-calendar season was decidedly unfavorable. Omitting the normal winter offseason caused potential difficulty with driver contracts, sponsor contracts, and equipment purchasing, which all traditionally followed a calendar-based schedule. In addition, the months of November, December, and most of January were not expected to be filled with race dates, since few suitable venues (outside of Orlando) were available in warm-weather locations. It was felt the long winter gap between races was disruptive and disjointed, and came at a time of year when auto racing was traditionally on hiatus anyway.

Following the 1996 races at New Hampshire and Las Vegas, on October 9, 1996, the Indy Racing League announced that the league would revert to a calendar-based schedule for 1998. To avoid awarding four championships in less than two and a half years, all events contested in the calendar year of 1997 were added to the two aforementioned races held in 1996. Now combined, a single seventeen-month 1996–1997 championship would be awarded in October 1997.

The two remaining races in 1996 (New Hampshire and Las Vegas) were contested with the same equipment as the 1996 season. All races that took place in the calendar year of 1997, starting with the race at Orlando, were contested with all new purpose-built oval chassis from G-Force and Dallara with a radical stock block naturally aspirated 4.0 liter V8's from Oldsmobile and Infiniti. Only seven drivers competed in all ten races of this seventeen-month-long marathon schedule.

== Confirmed entries ==
Team	Chassis	Engine	Tires	No.	Driver(s)	Round(s)
(United States) ABF Motorsports	Lola T92/00	Buick	G	96	(United States) Joe Gosek R	1
(United States) ABF Motorsports	Lola T92/00	Buick	G	96	(United States) Dave Steele R	2
(United States) A. J. Foyt Enterprises	Lola T95/00 (Note: Used in the 1996 races.); Dallara (Note: Used at Walt Disney World. Billy Boat used it at the Indy 500 and Las Vegas 2, and Scott Sharp used it at Pikes Peak.); G-Force	Ford-Cosworth; Oldsmobile	G	1	(United States) Scott Sharp (Note: Injured in a practice crash at Indianapolis and at Pikes Peak.)	1–5, 7
(United States) A. J. Foyt Enterprises	Lola T95/00; Dallara; G-Force	Ford-Cosworth; Oldsmobile	G	1	(United States) Johnny O'Connell	5
(United States) A. J. Foyt Enterprises	Lola T95/00; Dallara; G-Force	Ford-Cosworth; Oldsmobile	G	1	(United States) Paul Durant R (Note: Not considered rookie for Indy 500.)	5
(United States) A. J. Foyt Enterprises	Lola T95/00; Dallara; G-Force	Ford-Cosworth; Oldsmobile	G	1	(United States) Billy Boat R	6, 8–10
(United States) A. J. Foyt Enterprises	Lola T95/00; Dallara; G-Force	Ford-Cosworth; Oldsmobile	G	11	(United States) Billy Boat R	5
(United States) A. J. Foyt Enterprises	Lola T95/00; Dallara; G-Force	Ford-Cosworth; Oldsmobile	G	14	(United States) Davey Hamilton	All
(United States) Arizona Motorsports (Note: Official name of the team for the #40 entry for sponsorship reasons.) (United States) Sinden Racing Services	Lola T95/00	Ford-Cosworth	G F (Note: Used by Dr. Jack Miller.)	40	(Brazil) Marco Greco (Note: Run in conjunction with Team Scandia.)	1–2
(United States) Arizona Motorsports (United States) Sinden Racing Services	Dallara	Oldsmobile; Infiniti (Note: Used by Dr. Jack Miller from Indianapolis onwards.)	G F	40	(United States) Dr. Jack Miller R	3–10
(United States) Arizona Motorsports (United States) Sinden Racing Services	Dallara	Oldsmobile; Infiniti	G F	44	(United States) Steve Kinser R	5
(United States) Arizona Motorsports (United States) Sinden Racing Services	Dallara	Oldsmobile; Infiniti	G F	44	(United States) Allen May R	6
(United States) Beck Motorsports	Lola T94/00	Ford-Cosworth	F	54	(United States) Robbie Buhl	1–2
(United States) Beck Motorsports	Dallara	Infiniti	F	54	(United States) Dennis Vitolo	5
(United States) Blueprint Racing	Lola T93/00; Dallara	Menard (Note: Used at New Hampshire 1.); Buick (Note: Used at Las Vegas 1.); Oldsmobile	F	16	(United States) Johnny Parsons	2
(United States) Blueprint Racing	Lola T93/00; Dallara	Menard; Buick; Oldsmobile	F	16	(United States) Sam Schmidt R	4–6
(United States) Blueprint Racing	Lola T93/00; Dallara	Menard; Buick; Oldsmobile	F	27	(United States) Jim Guthrie R	All
(United States) Blueprint Racing	Lola T93/00; Dallara	Menard; Buick; Oldsmobile	F	72	(Canada) Claude Bourbonnais (Note: Considered rookie only for the Indy 500.)	5
(United States) Bradley Motorsports	Reynard 95I; G-Force	Ford-Cosworth; Oldsmobile	F G	12	(United States) Buzz Calkins (Note: Injured in a testing crash at New Hampshire.)	1–7, 9–10
(United States) Byrd-Cunningham Racing	Reynard 95I; G-Force	Ford-Cosworth; Infiniti (Note: Used from Walt Disney World to Pikes Peak.); Oldsmobile	F	10	(United States) Mike Groff (Note: Injured in practice crashes at Texas and New Hampshire 2.)	1–5, 8
(United States) Byrd-Cunningham Racing	Reynard 95I; G-Force	Ford-Cosworth; Infiniti; Oldsmobile	F	10	(United States) Johnny Unser	6–7, 9
(United States) Byrd-Cunningham Racing	Reynard 95I; G-Force	Ford-Cosworth; Infiniti; Oldsmobile	F	10	(United States) Paul Durant R	10
(United States) Chastain Motorsports	G-Force	Oldsmobile	G	77	(France) Stéphan Grégoire	3–5, 7–10
(United States) Chitwood Motorsports	Dallara	Oldsmobile	G	17	(United States) Danny Ongais	3
(United States) Chitwood Motorsports	Dallara	Oldsmobile	G	17	(Brazil) Affonso Giaffone R	4–10
(United States) Della Penna Motorsports	Reynard 95I	Ford-Cosworth	G	4	(United States) Richie Hearn	1–2
(Italy) EuroInternational	Dallara	Oldsmobile	F	50	(United States) Billy Roe R	4–5
(United States) Galles Racing	G-Force	Oldsmobile	G	4	(United States) Davy Jones	3
(United States) Galles Racing	G-Force	Oldsmobile	G	4	(United States) Jeff Ward R	3
(United States) Galles Racing	G-Force	Oldsmobile	G	4	(Sweden) Kenny Bräck R	4–10
(United States) Galles Racing	G-Force	Oldsmobile	G	70	(Brazil) Marco Greco	7–10
(United States) Hemelgarn Racing	Reynard 95I	Ford-Cosworth; Infiniti; Oldsmobile (Note: Used by Buddy Lazier from Indianapolis onwards.)	F	9	(United States) Brad Murphey R	1–2
(United States) Hemelgarn Racing	Reynard 95I; Dallara	Ford-Cosworth; Infiniti; Oldsmobile	F	9	(United States) Johnny Unser	5, 10
(United States) Hemelgarn Racing	Reynard 95I; Dallara	Ford-Cosworth; Infiniti; Oldsmobile	F	90	(United States) Lyn St. James	5
(United States) Hemelgarn Racing	Reynard 95I; Dallara	Ford-Cosworth; Infiniti; Oldsmobile	F	91	(United States) Buddy Lazier	All
(United States) ISM Racing	Dallara	Oldsmobile	G	35	(United States) Jeff Ward R (Note: Run in conjunction with Sinden Racing Services.)	10
(United States) IZ Racing	Dallara	Infiniti	G	95	(United States) Tyce Carlson R	10
(Sweden) Johansson Motorsports	G-Force	Infiniti	F	36	(United States) Scott Harrington R	5
(United States) Knapp Motorsports	Dallara	Oldsmobile	F	97	(United States) Greg Ray R (Note: 1. 31 at Charlotte because of a technical/sponsorship deal with Richard Childress Racing.)	5–8, 10
(United States) LP Racing	Dallara	Oldsmobile	F	99	(United States) Sam Schmidt R	8–10
(United States) McCormack Motorsports	Lola T94/00	Ford-Cosworth	G	30	(United States) Stan Wattles R	1–2
(United States) McCormack Motorsports	G-Force	Oldsmobile	G	30	(United States) Jeret Schroeder R	3–4
(United States) McCormack Motorsports	G-Force	Oldsmobile	G	30	(United States) Robbie Groff R	5–10
(United States) Metro Racing Systems	Riley & Scott	Oldsmobile	G	19	(United States) Stan Wattles R	10
(United States) Nienhouse Motorsports	Riley & Scott	Oldsmobile	G	23	(United States) Mike Shank R	10
(United States) Pagan Racing	Reynard 95I; Reynard 94I; Dallara	Ford-Cosworth; Infiniti (Note: Used from Walt Disney World to Texas.); Oldsmobile	G	21	(Colombia) Roberto Guerrero	All
(United States) PDM Racing	Lola T93/00; Dallara; G-Force (Note: Used at Las Vegas 2 by John Paul Jr.)	Menard; Oldsmobile	G	18	(United States) John Paul Jr.	1–5, 8–10
(United States) PDM Racing	Lola T93/00; Dallara; G-Force	Menard; Oldsmobile	G	18	(United States) Tyce Carlson R	5–6
(United States) PDM Racing	Lola T93/00; Dallara; G-Force	Menard; Oldsmobile	G	18	(United States) Billy Boat R	7
(United States) PDM Racing	Lola T93/00; Dallara; G-Force	Menard; Oldsmobile	G	28	(United States) Tyce Carlson R	1–2
(United States) Kelley Racing – PDM	Lola T93/00; Dallara; G-Force	Menard; Oldsmobile	G	28	(United States) Mark Dismore	5–10
(United States) Project Indy	Reynard 95I	Ford-Cosworth	G	64	(United States) Johnny Unser	1–2
(United States) Roe Racing	Dallara	Oldsmobile	F	24	(United States) Billy Roe R	10
(United States) Team Cheever	Lola T95/00; G-Force	Menard; Oldsmobile	G	51	(United States) Eddie Cheever	All
(United States) Team Cheever	Lola T95/00; G-Force	Menard; Oldsmobile	G	52	(United States) Jeff Ward R	5
(United States) Team Menard	Lola T95/00; G-Force	Menard; Oldsmobile	F	2	(United States) Tony Stewart	All
(United States) Team Menard	Lola T95/00; G-Force	Menard; Oldsmobile	F	3	(United States) Mark Dismore	1–2
(United States) Team Menard	Lola T95/00; G-Force	Menard; Oldsmobile	F	3	(United States) Robbie Buhl (Note: Injured in a testing crash prior to Pikes Peak.)	4–6, 9–10
(United States) Team SABCO	G-Force	Oldsmobile	G	42	(United States) Robby Gordon	5
(United States) Team Scandia	Lola T95/00; Reynard 95I (Note: Used by Michele Alboreto.); Lola T94/00 (Note: Used by Affonso Giaffone.); Dallara	Ford-Cosworth; Oldsmobile	G	7	(Chile) Eliseo Salazar (Note: Injured in a testing crash at Walt Disney World.)	1–2, 5–10
(United States) Team Scandia	Lola T95/00; Reynard 95I; Lola T94/00; Dallara	Ford-Cosworth; Oldsmobile	G	8	(France) Stéphan Grégoire	2
(United States) Team Scandia	Lola T95/00; Reynard 95I; Lola T94/00; Dallara	Ford-Cosworth; Oldsmobile	G	8	(Italy) Vincenzo Sospiri R	5–6
(United States) Team Scandia	Lola T95/00; Reynard 95I; Lola T94/00; Dallara	Ford-Cosworth; Oldsmobile	G	22	(France) Stéphan Grégoire	1
(United States) Team Scandia	Lola T95/00; Reynard 95I; Lola T94/00; Dallara	Ford-Cosworth; Oldsmobile	G	22	(Mexico) Michel Jourdain Jr.	2
(United States) Team Scandia	Lola T95/00; Reynard 95I; Lola T94/00; Dallara	Ford-Cosworth; Oldsmobile	G	22	(Brazil) Marco Greco	3–6
(United States) Team Scandia	Lola T95/00; Reynard 95I; Lola T94/00; Dallara	Ford-Cosworth; Oldsmobile	G	22	(Italy) Vincenzo Sospiri R	7–10
(United States) Team Scandia	Lola T95/00; Reynard 95I; Lola T94/00; Dallara	Ford-Cosworth; Oldsmobile	G	33	(Italy) Michele Alboreto	1–2
(United States) Team Scandia	Lola T95/00; Reynard 95I; Lola T94/00; Dallara	Ford-Cosworth; Oldsmobile	G	33	(Spain) Fermín Vélez R	3–6
(United States) Team Scandia	Lola T95/00; Reynard 95I; Lola T94/00; Dallara	Ford-Cosworth; Oldsmobile	G	33	(United States) Jimmy Kite R	7–10
(United States) Team Scandia	Lola T95/00; Reynard 95I; Lola T94/00; Dallara	Ford-Cosworth; Oldsmobile	G	34	(Brazil) Affonso Giaffone R	2
(United States) Team Scandia	Lola T95/00; Reynard 95I; Lola T94/00; Dallara	Ford-Cosworth; Oldsmobile	G	34	(Italy) Alessandro Zampedri	5–6
(United States) Tempero/Giuffre Racing	Lola T93/00	Buick	G	15	(United States) David Kudrave	1
(United States) Tempero/Giuffre Racing	Lola T93/00	Buick	G	15	(Chile) Juan Carlos Carbonell R	2
(United States) Treadway Racing	Reynard 95I; Reynard 94I (Note: Used by Johnny O'Connell.); G-Force	Ford-Cosworth; Oldsmobile	F	5	(Netherlands) Arie Luyendyk	All
(United States) Treadway Racing	Reynard 95I; Reynard 94I; G-Force	Ford-Cosworth; Oldsmobile	F	6	(United States) Johnny O'Connell	1–2
(United States) Treadway Racing	Reynard 95I; Reynard 94I; G-Force	Ford-Cosworth; Oldsmobile	F	6	(Canada) Scott Goodyear	3–10
(United States) Walker Racing	Reynard 95I	Ford-Cosworth	G	50	(United States) Robby Gordon	2

== Schedule ==
Rd	Date	Race Name	Track	Location
1	August 18 1996	True Value 200	New Hampshire International Speedway	Loudon, New Hampshire
2	September 15 1996	1996 Las Vegas 500K	Las Vegas Motor Speedway	Las Vegas, Nevada
3	January 25 1997	Indy 200 at Walt Disney World	Walt Disney World Speedway	Bay Lake, Florida
4	March 23 1997	Phoenix 200	Phoenix International Raceway	Phoenix, Arizona
5	May 26–27 1997	81st Indianapolis 500	Indianapolis Motor Speedway	Speedway, Indiana
6	June 7 1997	True Value 500	Texas Motor Speedway	Fort Worth, Texas
7	June 29 1997	Samsonite 200	Pikes Peak International Raceway	Fountain, Colorado
8	July 27 1997	VisionAire 500	Charlotte Motor Speedway	Concord, North Carolina
9	August 17 1997	Pennzoil 200	New Hampshire International Speedway	Loudon, New Hampshire
10	October 11 1997	1997 Las Vegas 500K	Las Vegas Motor Speedway	Las Vegas, Nevada

All races were run on oval speedways.

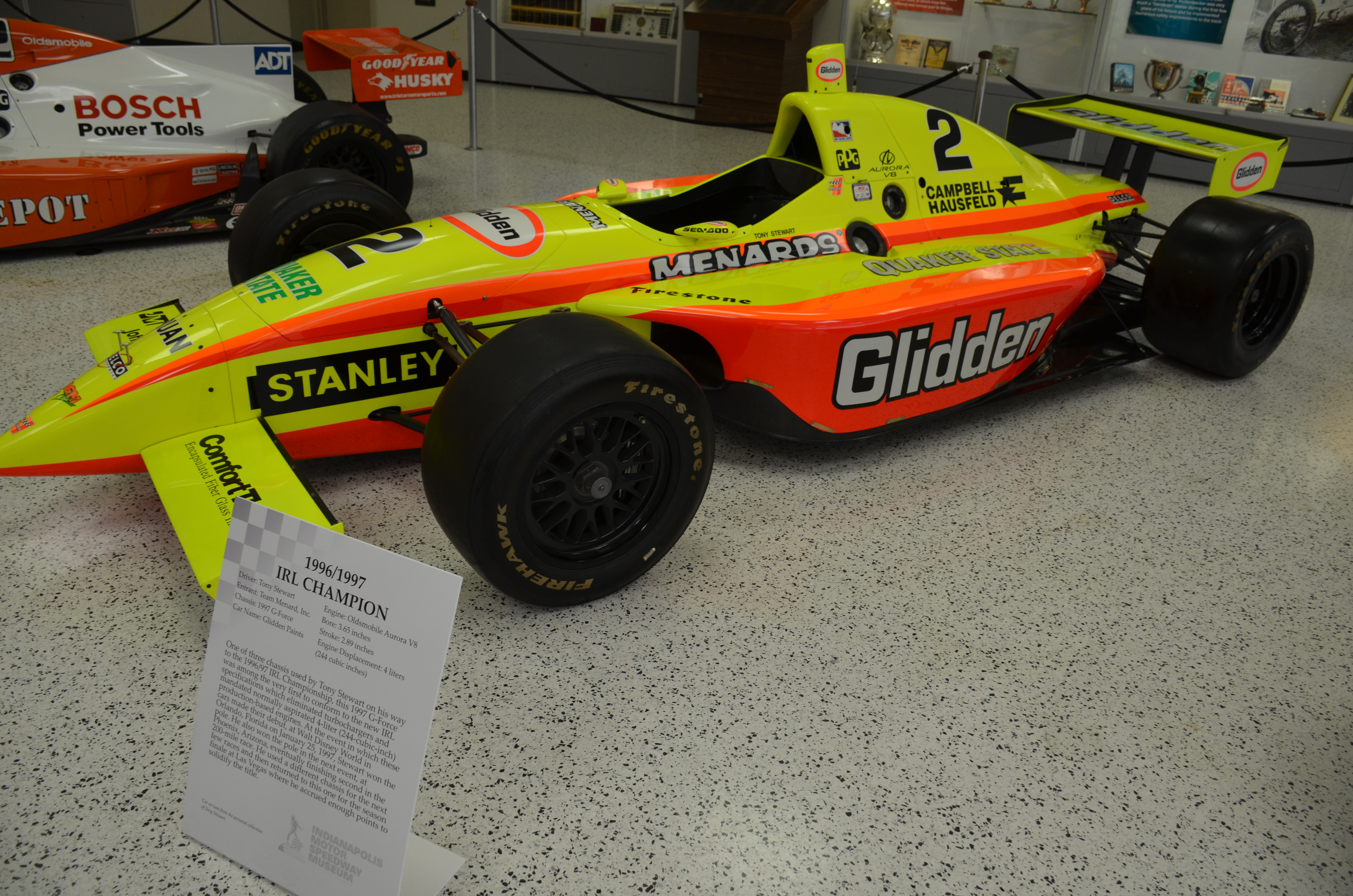
Tony Stewart's championship car.

After the 1996 prologue-style, 3-race season that ended at the 80th Indianapolis 500, the 1996–97 season had just two further races in calendar year 1996, at New Hampshire International Speedway, a former CART venue, and a barely inaugurated Las Vegas Motor Speedway. On 9 October 1996, the IRL decided to revert to a calendar-based format for 1998, moving the intended end of the 1996–97 season at Indianapolis in May to Las Vegas in October.

For calendar year 1997, all five races from 1996 were held again, alongside three further races, contested consecutively in the summer months after the Indianapolis 500. Two new venues, Texas Motor Speedway and Pikes Peak International Raceway, was followed by IRL's first incursion in a NASCAR foothold, the Charlotte Motor Speedway. Texas and Charlotte held the first night races in Indy-car history, and became the first 1.5 mile banked oval racetracks in an Indy-car schedule since Atlanta Motor Speedway in 1983.

== Results ==
Round	Race	Pole position	Fastest lap	Most laps led	Race Winner				Report
Round	Race	Pole position	Fastest lap	Most laps led	Driver	Team	Chassis	Engine	Report
1	New Hampshire 1	(United States) Richie Hearn	(United States) Tony Stewart	(United States) Tony Stewart	(United States) Scott Sharp	A. J. Foyt Enterprises	Lola	Ford-Cosworth	Report
2	Las Vegas 1	(Netherlands) Arie Luyendyk	(United States) Richie Hearn	(United States) Richie Hearn	(United States) Richie Hearn	Della Penna Motorsports	Reynard	Ford-Cosworth	Report
3	Walt Disney World	(United States) Tony Stewart	(United States) Tony Stewart	(United States) Tony Stewart	(United States) Eddie Cheever	Team Cheever	G-Force	Oldsmobile	Report
4	Phoenix	(United States) Tony Stewart	(United States) Tony Stewart	(United States) Tony Stewart	(United States) Jim Guthrie	Blueprint Racing	Dallara	Oldsmobile	Report
5	Indianapolis	(Netherlands) Arie Luyendyk	(United States) Tony Stewart	(United States) Tony Stewart	(Netherlands) Arie Luyendyk	Treadway Racing	G-Force	Oldsmobile	Report
6	Texas	(United States) Tony Stewart	(United States) Tony Stewart	(United States) Tony Stewart	(Netherlands) Arie Luyendyk	Treadway Racing	G-Force	Oldsmobile	Report
7	Pikes Peak	(United States) Scott Sharp	(United States) Jimmy Kite	(United States) Tony Stewart	(United States) Tony Stewart	Team Menard	G-Force	Oldsmobile	Report
8	Charlotte	(United States) Tony Stewart	(United States) Billy Boat	(United States) Tony Stewart	(United States) Buddy Lazier	Hemelgarn Racing	Dallara	Oldsmobile	Report
9	New Hampshire 2	(Brazil) Marco Greco	(Italy) Vincenzo Sospiri	(United States) Eddie Cheever	(United States) Robbie Buhl	Team Menard	G-Force	Oldsmobile	Report
10	Las Vegas 2	(United States) Billy Boat	(United States) Billy Boat	(Chile) Eliseo Salazar	(Chile) Eliseo Salazar	Team Scandia	Dallara	Oldsmobile	Report

== Race summaries ==
=== True Value 200 ===
The True Value 200 was held on August 18, 1996, at New Hampshire International Speedway. Richie Hearn qualified on the pole position.

Top 10 results

1. 1 – Scott Sharp
2. 12 – Buzz Calkins
3. 33 – Michele Alboreto
4. 10 – Mike Groff
5. 14 – Davey Hamilton
6. 21 – Roberto Guerrero
7. 40 – Marco Greco
8. 22 – Stéphan Grégoire
9. 7 – Eliseo Salazar
10. 18 – John Paul Jr.

Failed to qualify: 24-Randy Tolsma, 25-Jon Field, 64-Johnny Unser, 75-Johnny O'Connell and 96-Mike Orday

- This was Sharp's first IndyCar win.
- The win was also the first for A. J. Foyt Enterprises since A. J. Foyt won the 1981 Van Scoy Diamond Mines 500 at Pocono International Raceway.
- Tony Stewart was the class of the field leading for 165 of 200 laps, accruing a nearly 3 lap lead over second place. However, he suffered complete electrical failure after 182 laps and finished 12th.

=== Las Vegas 500K (1996) ===
The Las Vegas 500K was held on September 15, 1996, at Las Vegas Motor Speedway. Arie Luyendyk qualified on the pole position.

Top 10 results

1. 4 – Richie Hearn
2. 22 – Michel Jourdain Jr.
3. 10 – Mike Groff
4. 21 – Roberto Guerrero
5. 33 – Michele Alboreto
6. 12 – Buzz Calkins
7. 7 – Eliseo Salazar
8. 54 – Robbie Buhl
9. 40 – Marco Greco
10. 34 – Affonso Giaffone

Failed to qualify: 96-Dave Steele

- This was the final IRL race contested with the turbocharged machines.
- Hearn's only IndyCar win. Because he and his team, Della Penna Motorsports, were switching to CART for 1997, he would not compete in any more IRL races for the remainder of the season.
- The slow pace of the race, consisting of nine cautions, caused ABC to leave just past the halfway point.
- Johnny O'Connell had a violent crash on lap 185 that resulted in him sliding upside down on the main straightaway resulting in a short red flag period.
- Johnny Parsons' final IndyCar race. He had started IndyCar races since 1969. In this race, he crashed on lap nine and finished 28th (last).

=== Indy 200 ===
The Indy 200 was held on January 25, 1997, at Walt Disney World Speedway. Tony Stewart qualified on the pole position.

Top 10 results

1. 51 – Eddie Cheever
2. 10 – Mike Groff
3. 6 – Scott Goodyear
4. 1 – Scott Sharp
5. 91 – Buddy Lazier
6. 27 – Jim Guthrie
7. 14 – Davey Hamilton
8. 22 – Marco Greco
9. 33 – Fermin Velez
10. 2 – Tony Stewart (DNF, crash)

Failed to qualify: 4-Davy Jones

- The race was shortened from 200 laps to 149 laps due to rain.
- This was the first IRL race contested with the normally aspirated engines and new chassis.
- This was Eddie Cheever's first Indy car win.
- Buzz Calkins was leading when his engine failed on lap 145. Stewart took the lead, but crashed on the following lap. Cheever inherited the lead and the race was stopped three laps later when a downpour ensued.
- Danny Ongais' final IndyCar race. He finished 13th due to a crash after 94 laps.

=== Phoenix 200 ===
The Phoenix 200 was held on March 23, 1997, at Phoenix International Raceway. Tony Stewart qualified on the pole position.

Top 10 results

1. 27 – Jim Guthrie
2. 2 – Tony Stewart
3. 14 – Davey Hamilton
4. 22 – Marco Greco
5. 77 – Stéphan Grégoire
6. 10 – Mike Groff
7. 21 – Roberto Guerrero
8. 12 – Buzz Calkins
9. 18 – John Paul Jr.
10. 16 – Sam Schmidt

Failed to qualify: 17-Danny Ongais and 54-Robbie Buhl

- Guthrie's only IndyCar win. He stretched his fuel over the final 82 laps and the $170,100 payout allowed him to settle off his debts from getting a second mortgage.
- Kenny Bräck and Sam Schmidt made their IndyCar debuts in this race. Bräck led 24 laps, but crashed on lap 146 and finished 11th. Schmidt crashed on lap 176, but finished 10th.

=== Indianapolis 500 ===
The Indianapolis 500 was scheduled for May 25, 1997. Rain postponed the start until the following day: Monday, May 26. After 15 laps were run on Monday, rain fell again, halting the race, and postponing it for another day. It was resumed and run to conclusion Tuesday, May 27. Arie Luyendyk qualified on the pole position.

Top 10 results

1. 5 – Arie Luyendyk
2. 6 – Scott Goodyear
3. 52 – Jeff Ward
4. 91 – Buddy Lazier
5. 2 – Tony Stewart
6. 14 – Davey Hamilton
7. 11 – Billy Boat
8. 3 – Robbie Buhl
9. 30 – Robbie Groff
10. 33 – Fermin Velez

Failed to qualify: 1-Scott Sharp, 1-Johnny O'Connell, 18-John Paul Jr. and 36-Scott Harrington

- On lap 199, the caution came when Stewart brushed the wall and it was expected that the race would end under caution. However, the green flag and the white flag came out simultaneously without warning to start the final lap and caution lights were still displayed around the track, causing confusion if the race was really restarted.
- Treadway Racing's cars finished 1st and 2nd, making it the first time since 1962 with Leader Card Racing that a team finished 1st and 2nd.
- The starting grid was expanded from 33 to 35 cars due to the 25/8 rule (which guaranteed the top 25 cars in the IRL standings a starting position, provided they meet a minimum speed) causing cars outside the fastest 33 to qualify. As a result, Lyn St. James and Johnny Unser were added to the rear of the field.
- A crash during the pace lap on Monday caused all of row 5 (Stéphan Grégoire, Affonso Giaffone and Kenny Bräck) to retire.
- Sharp was injured in a practice crash and replaced by O'Connell, who then was injured in practice. Paul Durant successfully qualified via the 25/8 rule (see above) and finished 21st.

=== True Value 500 ===
The inaugural True Value 500 was held June 7, 1997, at Texas Motor Speedway. Tony Stewart qualified on the pole position.

Top 10 results

1. 5 – Arie Luyendyk
2. 1 – Billy Boat
3. 14 – Davey Hamilton
4. 6 – Scott Goodyear
5. 2 – Tony Stewart
6. 51 – Eddie Cheever
7. 7 – Eliseo Salazar
8. 97 – Greg Ray
9. 8 – Vincenzo Sospiri
10. 10 – Johnny Unser

Failed to qualify: 10-Mike Groff, 36-Scott Harrington, 50-Billy Roe, 77-Stéphan Grégoire and 90-Lyn St. James

- Boat was initially declared the winner due to a scoring error. Luyendyk came into victory lane to protest, but was slapped by A. J. Foyt. The error was eventually realized and Luyendyk was declared the winner. Foyt still has the original trophy.
- Stewart appeared to be on his way to his first win when his engine blew, causing him to then crash, on lap 207.
- Points leader Groff was injured in practice. Unser drove in his place to a 10th-place finish.
- In the aftermath of the scoring error, USAC was removed as sanctioning body and the IRL went in-house.

=== Samsonite 200 ===
The inaugural Samsonite 200 was held on June 29, 1997, at Pikes Peak International Raceway. Scott Sharp qualified on the pole position.

Top 10 results

1. 2 – Tony Stewart
2. 77 – Stéphan Grégoire
3. 14 – Davey Hamilton
4. 51 – Eddie Cheever
5. 12 – Buzz Calkins
6. 22 – Vincenzo Sospiri
7. 6 – Scott Goodyear
8. 91 – Buddy Lazier
9. 17 – Affonso Giaffone
10. 30 – Robbie Groff

Failed to qualify: 3-Robbie Buhl and 27-Jim Guthrie

- This was Stewart's first IndyCar win.
- Scott Sharp returned in this race and qualified on the pole position. However, he crashed on the first lap and re-injured himself, missing the rest of the season.
- This was the first race for the IRL as the sole sanctioning body and sole operator of race control

=== VisionAire 500 ===
The inaugural VisionAire 500 was held on July 26, 1997, at Charlotte Motor Speedway. Tony Stewart qualified on the pole position.

Top 10 results

1. 91 – Buddy Lazier
2. 1 – Billy Boat
3. 6 – Scott Goodyear
4. 17 – Affonso Giaffone
5. 4 – Kenny Bräck
6. 51 – Eddie Cheever
7. 2 – Tony Stewart
8. 77 – Stéphan Grégoire
9. 70 – Marco Greco
10. 7 – Eliseo Salazar
- Greg Ray's car was run in conjunction with Richard Childress Racing for this race.

=== Pennzoil 200 ===
The Pennzoil 200 was held August 17, 1997, at New Hampshire International Speedway. Marco Greco qualified on the pole position.

Top 10 results

1. 3 – Robbie Buhl
2. 22 – Vincenzo Sospiri
3. 5 – Arie Luyendyk
4. 7 – Eliseo Salazar
5. 4 – Kenny Bräck
6. 21 – Roberto Guerrero
7. 18 – John Paul Jr.
8. 1 – Billy Boat
9. 51 – Eddie Cheever
10. 30 – Robbie Groff

Failed to qualify: 10-Mike Groff and 97-Greg Ray

- This was Buhl's first IndyCar win.
- Mike Groff was injured once again in practice and missed the remainder of the season.
- Entering the season finale at Las Vegas, Tony Stewart led Davey Hamilton by 10 points.

=== Las Vegas 500K (1997) ===
The Las Vegas 500K was held on October 11, 1997, at Las Vegas Motor Speedway. Billy Boat qualified on the pole.

Top 10 results

1. 7 – Eliseo Salazar
2. 6 – Scott Goodyear
3. 3 – Robbie Buhl
4. 27 – Jim Guthrie
5. 28 – Mark Dismore
6. 33 – Jimmy Kite
7. 14 – Davey Hamilton
8. 19 – Stan Wattles
9. 77 – Stéphan Grégoire
10. 70 – Marco Greco
- This was Salazar's first and only IndyCar win.
- Tony Stewart won the championship by six points over Hamilton by virtue of finishing 11th to Hamilton's 7th.
- On lap 201, Roberto Guerrero lost control on the back straightway and flipped through the grass.
- By virtue of Arie Luyendyk finishing 25th due to engine failure and Scott Goodyear finishing 2nd, Goodyear was able to leapfrog from 9th in the season standings to 5th for the final season standings.

== Points standings ==
Pos	Driver	NHS1	LVS1	WDW	PHX	INDY	TMS	PPR	CHA	NHS2	LVS2	Pts
1	(United States) Tony Stewart	12*	21	**10***	**2***	5*	**5***	1*	**7***	14	11	278
2	(United States) Davey Hamilton	5	11	7	3	6	3	3	16	17	7	272
3	(United States) Eddie Cheever	15	25	1	12	23	6	4	6	9*	21	230
3	(Brazil) Marco Greco	7	9	8	4	16	26	13	9	**20**	10	230
5	(Canada) Scott Goodyear			3	17	2	4	7	3	16	2	226
6	(Netherlands) Arie Luyendyk	13	**20**	12	22	**1**	1	15	21	3	25	223
7	(Colombia) Roberto Guerrero	6	4	17	7	27	13	18	17	6	14	221
8	(United States) Buddy Lazier	19	24	5	21	4	17	8	1	12	31	209
9	(Chile) Eliseo Salazar	9	7			24	7	12	10	4	1*	208
10	(United States) Buzz Calkins	2	6	11	8	11	19	5		21	28	204
11	(France) Stéphan Grégoire	8	26	19	5	31		2	8	15	9	192
12	(United States) Jim Guthrie RY	23	13	6	1	26	21	Wth	12	24	4	186
13	(United States) Robbie Buhl	22	8		18	8	16			1	3	170
14	(United States) Mike Groff	4	3	2	6	12	Wth		14	Wth		169
15	(United States) John Paul Jr.	10	15	18	9	Wth			11	7	12	163
16	(Brazil) Affonso Giaffone R		10		13	32	20	9	4	18	15	159
17	(United States) Mark Dismore	20	17			28	11	11	19	11	5	158
18	(United States) Billy Boat R					7	2	19	2	8	**23**	151
19	(Sweden) Kenny Bräck R				11	33	18	14	5	5	20	139
20	(United States) Robbie Groff R					9	15	10	13	10	18	135
21	(Italy) Vincenzo Sospiri R					17	9	6	20	2	22	134
22	(United States) Scott Sharp	1	16	4	16	Wth		**22**				119
23	(United States) Dr. Jack Miller R			15	20	20	24	16	23	19	29	114
24	(United States) Johnny Unser	Wth	22			18	10	21		13	19	107
25	(United States) Tyce Carlson R	11	23			19	14				24	84
26	(Spain) Fermín Vélez R			9	14	10	25					82
27	(United States) Jimmy Kite R							20	15	23	6	76
27	(United States) Sam Schmidt R				10	34	23		18	22	27	76
29	(United States) Greg Ray R					25	8	17	22		30	73
30	(United States) Jeff Ward R			16		3					17	69
31	(United States) Stan Wattles R	16	18								8	63
32	(Italy) Michele Alboreto	3	5									62
33	(United States) Richie Hearn	**14**	1*									59
34	(United States) Billy Roe R				15	22					13	55
35	(United States) Jeret Schroeder R			14	19							37
36	(Mexico) Michel Jourdain Jr.		2									33
37	(United States) Robby Gordon		14			29						27
38	(United States) Brad Murphey R	18	27									25
39	(Italy) Alessandro Zampedri					35	12					24
40	(United States) Johnny O'Connell		12			Wth						23
40	(United States) Paul Durant R					21					26	23
42	(United States) Danny Ongais			13								22
42	(United States) Lyn St. James					13						22
44	(United States) Steve Kinser R					14						21
45	(United States) Dennis Vitolo					15						20
46	(United States) Mike Shank R										16	19
47	(United States) David Kudrave	17										18
48	(Chile) Juan Carlos Carbonell R		19									16
49	(United States) Joe Gosek R	21										14
50	(United States) Allen May R						22					13
51	(United States) Johnny Parsons		28									7
52	(Canada) Claude Bourbonnais					30						5
–	(United States) Dave Steele R		Wth									0
–	(United States) Scott Harrington R					DNQ						0
–	(United States) Davy Jones			Wth								0
Pos	Driver	NHS1	LVS1	WDW	PHX	INDY	TMS	PPR	CHA	NHS2	LVS2	Pts

Color	Result
Gold	Winner
Silver	2nd place
Bronze	3rd place
Green	4th & 5th place
Light Blue	6th–10th place
Dark Blue	Finished (Outside Top 10)
Purple	Did not finish (Ret)
Red	Did not qualify (DNQ)
Brown	Withdrawn (Wth)
Black	Disqualified (DSQ)
White	Did not start (DNS)
Blank	Did not participate (DNP)
Blank	Not competing

**In-line notation**
**Bold**	Pole position (2 points)
Italics	Ran fastest race lap
*	Led most race laps (1 point)
DNS	Any driver who qualifies but does not start (DNS), earns all the points had they taken part.
RY	Rookie of the Year
R	Rookie

- Ties in points broken by number of wins, followed by number of 2nds, 3rds, etc., and then by number of pole positions, followed by number of times qualified 2nd, etc.

== See also ==
- 1997 Indianapolis 500
- 1997 Indy Lights season
- 1997 CART season
- 1997 Toyota Atlantic Championship season
- http://www.champcarstats.com/year/1996-97.htm
- http://media.indycar.com/pdf/2011/IICS_2011_Historical_Record_Book_INT6.pdf (p. 148–149)

== Bibliography ==
- Indy Review, Volume 7: 1996-1997 Indy Racing League Season. Osceola, WI: Indy 500 Publications / Indianapolis Motor Speedway Corporation. 1997. ISBN 978-1-880526-06-4.
