= G-Force GF01 =

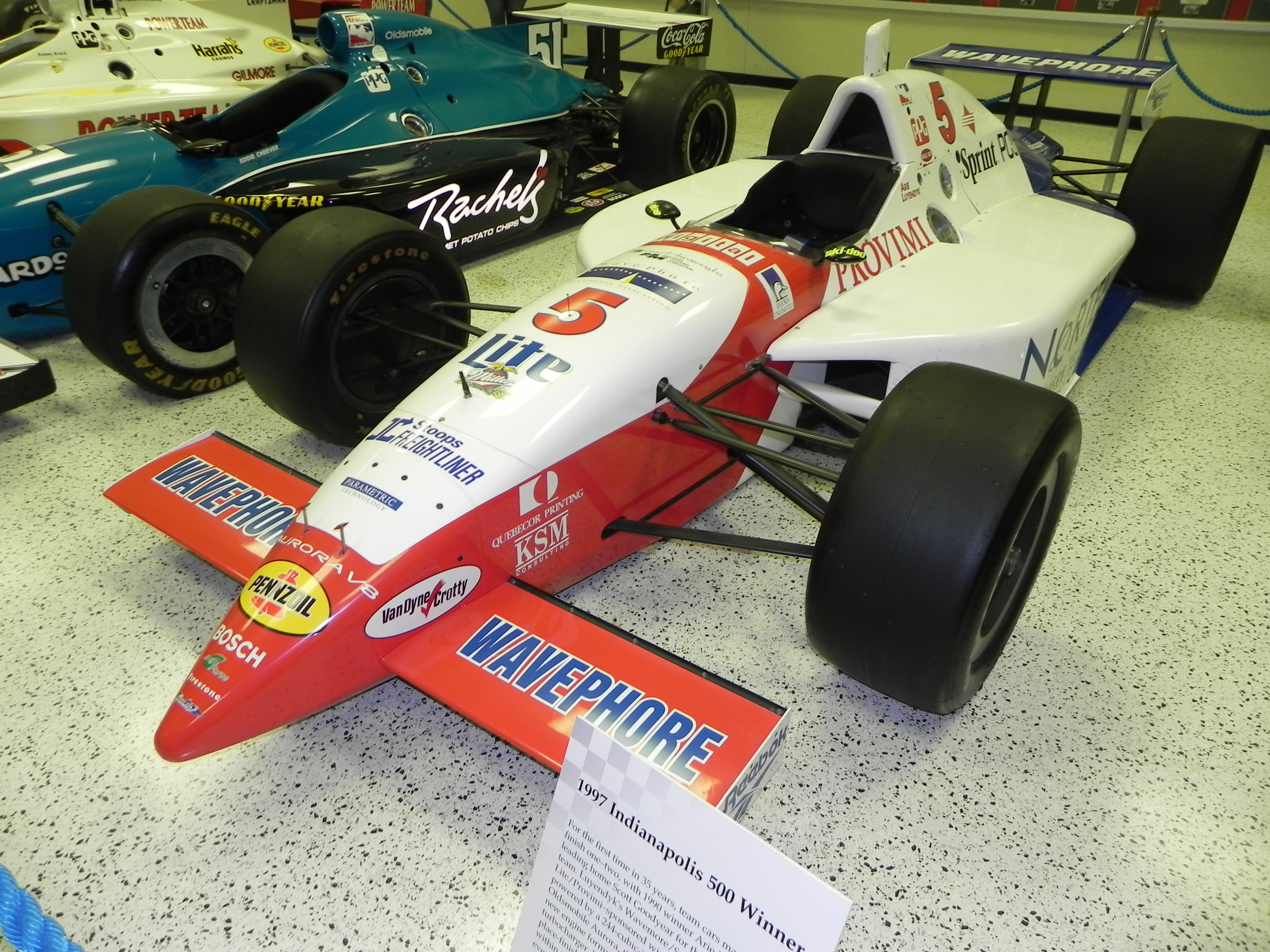
- Category: Indy Racing League
- Constructor: (United States) Élan Motorsport Technologies (United States) G-Force Technologies
- Designer: Paul Burgess
- Successor: G-Force GF05

Technical specifications
- Chassis: Carbon fiber monocoque with honeycomb kevlar structure
- Suspension: Pushrod with multilink
- Length: 4,877 mm (192 in)
- Width: 1,968 mm (77 in) minimum 1,994 mm (79 in) maximum
- Height: 965 mm (38 in)
- Axle track: Front: 1,702–1,722 mm (67–68 in); Rear: 1,613 mm (64 in)
- Wheelbase: 3,048 mm (120 in), plus or minus 51.5 mm (2997-3100 mm (118-122 mm))
- Engine: Oldsmobile 4.0 L (4,000 cc; 244 cu in) V8 90° naturally-aspirated, mid-engined, longitudinally-mounted
- Transmission: Xtrac #P295 6-speed sequential manual gearbox Adjustable spool type
- Power: 675–700 hp (503–522 kW)
- Weight: 1,565 lb (710 kg) on short, intermediate speedway oval and Indianapolis 500; 1,640 lb (744 kg) on road and street courses Including driver, fuel and all lubricants and coolants
- Fuel: 100% fuel grade Methanol
- Tyres: Firestone Firehawk dry slick and rain treaded tires O.Z. racing, BBS wheels

Competition history
- Debut: 1997 Indy 200 at Walt Disney World
Races	Wins	Poles	F/Laps
37	9	0	0
- Constructors' Championships: 0
- Drivers' Championships: 0

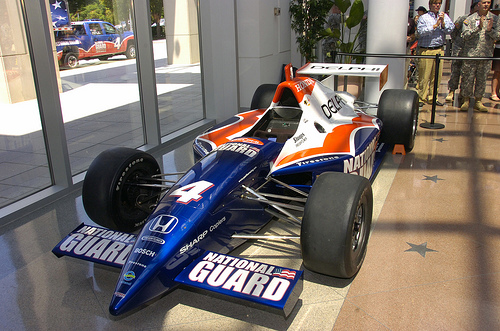
1998-spec Panoz GF01B

The G-Force GF01 is an open-wheel racing car developed and produced by American manufacturer Élan Motorsport Technologies for Panoz, with original work having been performed by G-Force Technologies, prior to its acquisition by Panoz, for use in the Indy Racing League. G-Force was chosen to be one of the new constructors for the first generation of inaugural IRL cars, along with Dallara, and the existing Lola and Reynard chassis' used in the existing Champ Car Series. It's powerplant was the 4.0-liter, naturally-aspirated, Oldsmobile Aurora Indy V8 engine, running on methanol fuel, and making between 675–700 hp (503–522 kW), with a rev limit of 10,500 rpm. It was used in active competition between 1997 and 1999, and was succeeded by the GF05 in 2000. It famously won the 1997 Indianapolis 500, being driven by Arie Luyendyk.
