= SSPF =

SSPF may refer to:

- Space Station Processing Facility, a factory at the Kennedy Space Center in Florida, U.S.
- SS and police leader, a senior Nazi official
- State Social Protection Fund (Azerbaijan)
- Sam Schmidt Paralysis Foundation, an American charitable organization
