= Claude Bourbonnais =

Canadian race car driver

- Nationality: Canadian
- Born: June 24, 1965 (age 61); L'Île-Perrot, Quebec

IndyCar Series career
- 1 race run over 1 year
- Best finish: 52nd (1996–97)
- First race: 1997 Indianapolis 500 (Indianapolis)
Wins	Podiums	Poles
0	0	0

Champ Car career
- 5 races run over 1 year
- Years active: 1994
- Team(s): ProFormance Motorsports; McCormack Motorsports
- Best finish: 50th (1994)
- First race: 1994 Grand Prix of Long Beach (Long Beach)
- Last race: 1994 Texaco-Havoline 200 (Elkhart Lake)
Wins	Podiums	Poles
0	0	0

Claude Bourbonnais (born June 24, 1965), is a Canadian former driver in the Toyota Atlantic, Indy Lights, and CART Championship Car series. He raced in the 1994 CART series with five starts. He also raced in the 1997 Indianapolis 500, which by then had become part of the Indy Racing League, completing nine laps and finishing in 30th position.

Bourbonnais was the Toyota Atlantic teammate of fellow French-Canadian and future Formula One world champion Jacques Villeneuve in 1993 and in fact finished ahead of Villeneuve in series points.

Bourbonnais has been working for major car manufacturer in USA doing demonstration drives and was also a driver coach in the American Ferrari Challenge.

== Career ==
=== Early career ===
Bourbonnais first appeared on the national Canadian racing circuits in 1983. He was introduced to racing by his father, who raced snowmobiles. Bourbonnais raced in the Formula 125 superkart series. Scoring several podium finishes, the Kali kart driver finished fifth in the Quebec championship standings. He dominated the following season winning all but two races. Most notably, Bourbonnais won the Formula 125 race supporting the 1984 Canadian Grand Prix at Circuit Gilles Villeneuve.

Following superkarts, Bourbonnais raced in the national Formula Ford 2000 series in Canada. In his debut season, Bourbonnais best result was a second place at Circuit Trois-Rivières, behind Dutchman Cor Euser. The Canadian driver finished one point shy of the top ten in the drivers championship. In 1986, Bourbonnais improved one championship position after exchanging his Reynard 83SF for a more recent Swift DB3. he also competed in the inaugural season of the Rothmans Porsche Challenge Series in 1986. His best result was a sixth place at Circuit Mont-Tremblant. After switching from the Swift DB3 into a Reynard 87SF, Bourbonnais started winning races in the 1987 Canadian Formula Ford 2000 series. Bourbonnais won at Mont-Tremblant improving to third in the championship standings. Retaining the 87SF for 1988 and 1989 Bourbonnais became a double champion. In 1988, Bourbonnais won six out of eight races. The following season, Bourbonnais scored six race wins out of nine races. He defeated many up and coming talents such as Jimmy Vasser and Ken Murillo For 1988, he also appeared in the U.S. based, SCCA sanctioned, Formula Continental class. He qualified for the SCCA National Championship Runoffs winning the race. Bourbonnais was the first to do so in a Formula Ford 2000 chassis, as previous editions of the Formula Continental race were won by Formula Super Vee chassis. Bourbonnais won the race from pole position, also setting the fastest race lap. Curtis Farley finished second, more than nine seconds behind Bourbonnais.

After his 1988 success, Bourbonnais stepped up to the highly popular Formula Atlantic series. Racing in the Atlantic division, opposed to the Pacific debut, Bourbonnais impressed at his debut. In his first Atlantic race, at Lime Rock Park, Bourbonnais won from pole position. The driver, racing a Swift DB4, finished third in the final standings. Improving the following year, Bourbonnais won two races. He was the fastest driver at Heartland Park Topeka and again at Lime Rock Park. As Brian Till won three races, Bourbonnais finished second in the championship standings.

=== Racing in Europe ===
Bourbonnais also tried his luck racing in Europe. He attempted to race in the final two rounds of the 1990 International Formula 3000 Championship. At the Bugatti Circuit, 34 drivers tried to qualify for the 25 racing spots. Bourbonnais set the 29th fastest time, therefore he did not qualify for the race. A second attempt came at Circuit Paul Armagnac. Again, Bourbonnais failed to qualify. Both times, Bourbonnais drove Pacific Racing entered Lola T90/50 cars powered by Mugen Honda engines.

For 1991, Bourbonnais signed with Courage Competition to race in the 1991 World Sportscar Championship. The team ran a Cougar C26S which contested the C2 class, for cars built according to 1991 Group C regulations. At the 1991 430 km of Monza the Canadian made his debut alongside Michel Trollé. The duo finished tenth overall. At the 24 Hours of Le Mans, the team was joined by Marco Brand. The team retired after 293 laps.

=== Return to the U.S. ===
In 1992, Bourbonnais had his racing season split between the U.S. and Great Britain. In the Atlantic Championship, Bourbonnais raced at the Canadian rounds of the now unified championship. He finished thirteenth at Montreal and seventh at Trois-Rivieres. The fast racer also ran a partial British Formula 3000 in 1992. After a third place at Donington Park, Bourbonnais was forced out of the series due to a lack of sponsors.

Having secured enough funding, provided by Player's cigarettes, Bourbonnais returned to the Atlantic Championship in 1993. The Forsythe/Green Racing entered driver won seven races. In the end, Bourbonnais was beaten to the championship by only four points to fellow Canadian David Empringham.

=== CART ===
Bourbonnais first races in a major championship were in the 1994 PPG Indy Car World Series, sanctioned by CART. He made his debut in the third round of the championship, the Grand Prix of Long Beach. He was entered by the short lived ProFormance Motorsports which existed only throughout 1993 and 1994 entering, Scott Pruett, John Paul, Jr. and Bourbonnais. His debut was short cut by a broken exhaust in his Chevrolet powered Lola T93/00 after 24 laps.

Later in the season, Bourbonnais returned with McCormack Motorsports. The driver suffered a single car crash at Toronto. Technical difficulties prevented finishes for Bourbonnais at Mid-Ohio, Vancouver and Road America.

=== Indy Lights ===
Bourbonnais ran a partial season in Indy Lights with Forsythe Racing in 1995. After some mediocre results, he scored a second place at New Hampshire International Speedway in a Buick powered Lola T93/20. He ran a full season with the American racing team in Indy Lights the following year. His racing season started with disappointed. A practice crash at Homestead-Miami Speedway left Bourbonnais with a concussion. Therefore, he missed the opening race of the season. Bourbonnais returned at Long Beach placing seventh. The following round at Nazareth Speedway, he scored his first pole position in the series. However, mechanical issues prevented a strong finish. The second half of the 1996 Indy Lights season Bourbonnais was very strong, as he scored a number of podium finishes. He even won the Indy Lights race at Vancouver. He finished fourth in the drivers championship.

Bourbonnais ran a partial season in 1997 with Eclipse Racing not scoring notable results.

=== Indy Racing League ===
Throughout his racing career, Bourbonnais made attempts at the Indy 500. His first start was the 1997 Indy 500. The legendary race was run over three days due to rain delays. After a practice crash, the Blueprint Racing team had to work hard to get Bourbonnais in the race. In a last chance qualifying session, he qualified his car in 32nd place.

Bourbonnais, along with Paul Durant, Robby Gordon, Sam Schmidt and Jim Guthrie, were granted extra practice laps. Due to engine troubles in earlier sessions the drivers made extra system checks. Engine troubles haunted Bourbonnais during the race. He survived a chaotic race start which took out five drivers before the start of the race. However, starting lap eight, the Oldsmobile Aurora V8 in Bourbonnais' Dallara IR7 blew. As he stopped down the backstretch, his stop caused a yellow flag.

In 1998, Bourbonnais made a second attempt at the Indy 500 with BLueprint Racing. Struggling for speed, he had to qualify on Bump day in order to make the race. Bourbonnais (and also Lyn St. James and Dan Drinan) failed to beat Johnny Unser's time to make the race.

=== Post-single-seater racing career ===
Besides single-seaters, Bourbonnais has raced in sportscars and GT's. In 1998, he joined Mike Davies and Bill Dollahite to race a Ferrari 333 SP in the 6 hours of Watkins Glen. The mainly amateur based team finished on an impressive tenth place overall, eighth in class. For 2000, Bourbonnais joined Philip Creighton Motorsports at the Grand-Am race at Trois-Rivieres. Together with teammate Scott Schubot, the team finished fourth overall in a Lola B2K/10.

In 2003, Bourbonnais returned for a one-off in the Trans-Am Series. Bourbonnais replaced Paul Gentilozzi at Rocketsports Racing for the race at Trois-Rivieres. He qualified his Jaguar XKR in third place, finishing the race in fifth.

=== Political career ===
In 2018, Bourbonnais began a career in politics by being a candidate for the Coalition Avenir Québec during the 2018 Quebec general election in Vaudreuil (provincial electoral district) where he finished second.

== Racing record ==
=== SCCA National Championship Runoffs ===
Year	Track	Car	Engine	Class	Finish	Start	Status
1988	Road Atlanta	Reynard 87SF	Ford	Formula Continental	1	1	Running

=== Complete International Formula 3000 results ===
(key)

Year	Entrant	1	2	3	4	5	6	7	8	9	10	11	DC	Points
1990	Pacific Racing	DON	SIL	PAU	JER	MNZ	PER	HOC	BRH	BIR	BUG; DNQ	NOG; DNQ	NC	0

=== 24 Hours of Le Mans results ===
Year	Team	Co-Drivers	Car	Class	Laps	Pos.	Class Pos.
1991	(France) Courage Compétition	(Italy) Marco Brand (France) Michel Trollé	Cougar C26S-Porsche	C2	293	NC	NC

=== American open–wheel racing results ===
(key) (Races in bold indicate pole position)

==== Toyota Atlantic Championship ====
Year	Team	1	2	3	4	5	6	7	8	9	10	11	12	13	14	15	Rank	Points
1991	High Bridge Racing	LBH	PHX	LIM	MON; 18	WGL	IOW										**52nd**	**1**
1991	Champ Rcg							TOR; 25	**TRR**; 17	VAN; 26	MOH	NAZ	LS1	LS2			**52nd**	**1**
1992	Comprep	MIA	PHX	LBH	LIM	MON; 4	WGL	TOR									**25th**	**20**
1992	Genoa Racing								TRR; 8	VAN	MOH	MOS	NAZ	LS1	LS2		**25th**	**20**
1993	Forsythe/Green Racing	PHX; 4	LBH; 1	ATL; 16	MIL; 1	**MON**; 18	**MOS**; 1	HAL; DNS	**TOR**; 1	LOU; 1	TRR; 13	VAN; 1	MOH; 2	**NAZ**; 1	LS1; 2	LS2; 19	**2nd**	**191**

==== CART ====
Year	Team	Chassis	Engine	1	2	3	4	5	6	7	8	9	10	11	12	13	14	15	16	Rank	Points	Ref
1994	ProFormance Motorsports	Lola T93/00	Ilmor 265C	SRF	PHX	LBH; 26	INDY	MIL	DET	POR	CLE									**50th**	**0**	
1994	McCormack Motorsports	Lola T93/00	Ilmor 265C									TOR; 24	MIS	MOH; 24	NHM	VAN; 21	ROA; 30	NZR	LS	**50th**	**0**	

==== Indy Lights ====
Year	Team	1	2	3	4	5	6	7	8	9	10	11	12	13	Rank	Points	Ref
1995	Forsythe Racing	MIA; 7	**PHX**; 22	LBH; 15	NAZ; DNS	MIL	DET	POR	TOR	CLE	NHA; 2	VAN; 19	LS; 7		**13th**	**29**	
1996	Forsythe Racing	MIA; DNQ	LBH; 7	**NAZ**; 16	MIS; 18	MIL; 8	DET; 3	POR; 4	CLE; 2	TOR; 2	TRO; 20	VAN; 1	LS; 3		**4th**	**104**	
1997	Eclipse Racing	MIA	LBH	NAZ	SAV	STL	MIL	DET	POR	TOR; 19	TRO; 18	VAN; 28	LS; 18	FON	**33rd**	**0**	

==== Indy Racing League ====
Year	Team	Chassis	No.	Engine	1	2	3	4	5	6	7	8	9	10	11	Rank	Points	Ref
1996–97	Blueprint Racing	Dallara	72	Oldsmobile	NHM	LVS	WDW	PHX	INDY; 30	TXS	PPIR	CLT	NH2	LV2		**52nd**	**5**	
1998	Blueprint Racing	Dallara	27	Oldsmobile	WDW	PHX	INDY; DNQ	TXS	NHM	DOV	CLT	PPIR	ATL	TX2	LVS	NC	0	
