= 1997 Indianapolis 500 =

American motor race

81st Indianapolis 500
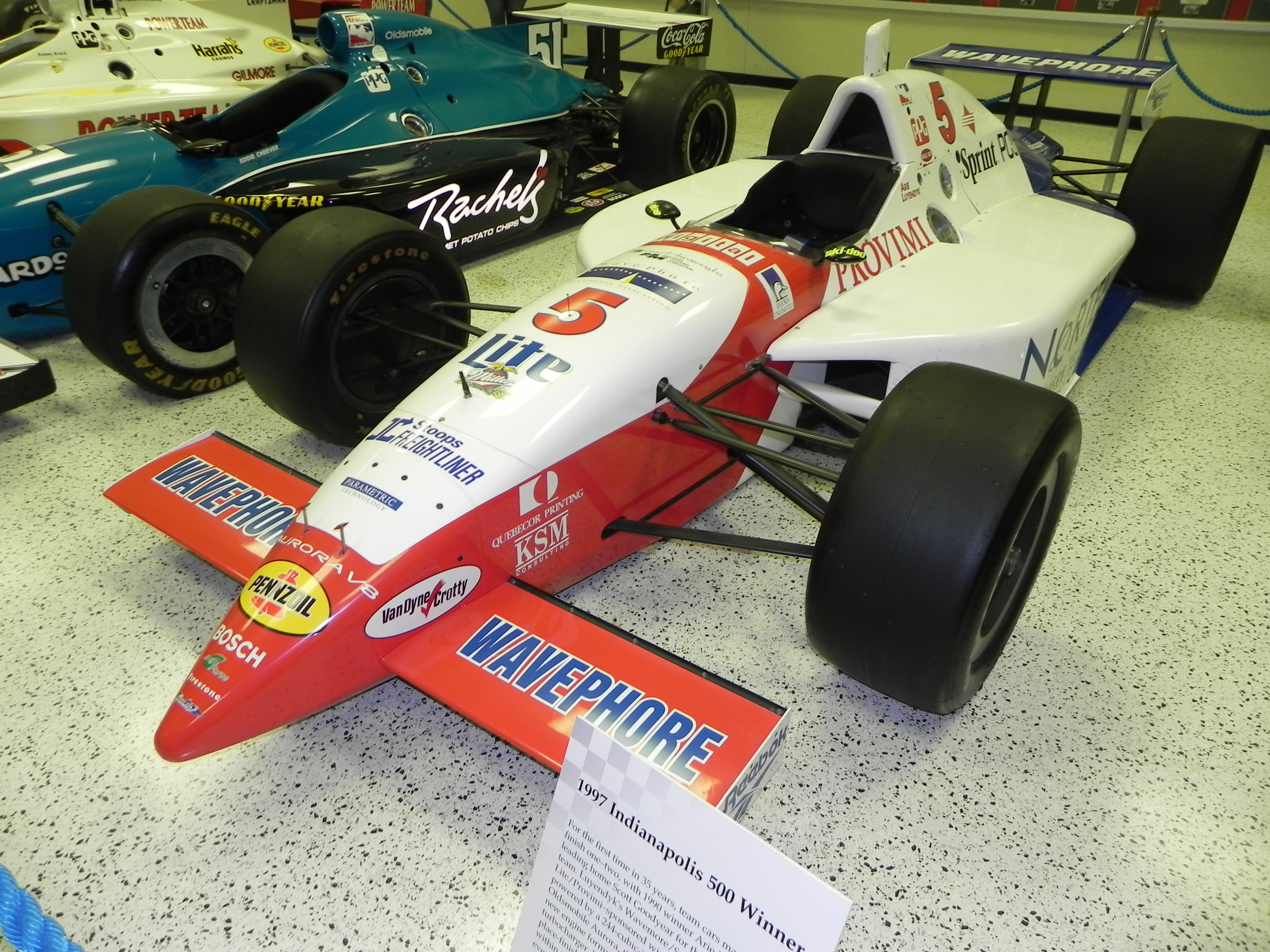

Indianapolis Motor Speedway

Indianapolis 500
- Sanctioning body: USAC/IRL
- Season: 1996-97 IRL season
- Date: May 25-26-27, 1997
- Winner: (Netherlands) Arie Luyendyk
- Winning team: Treadway Racing
- Winning Chief Mechanic: Skip Faul
- Time of race: 3:25:43.388
- Average speed: 145.827 mph
- Pole position: (Netherlands) Arie Luyendyk
- Pole speed: 218.263
- Fastest qualifier: (Netherlands) Arie Luyendyk
- Rookie of the Year: (United States) Jeff Ward
- Most laps led: (United States) Tony Stewart (64)

Pre-race ceremonies
- National anthem: Florence Henderson
- "Back Home Again in Indiana": Jim Nabors (recording)
- Starting command: Mari Hulman George
- Pace car: Oldsmobile Aurora
- Pace car driver: Johnny Rutherford
- Starter: Bryan Howard
- Honorary starter: Ronald Fogleman
- Estimated attendance: 300,000 (Sun.); 200,000 (Mon.); 100,000 (Tue.)

Television in the United States
- Network: ABC
- Announcers: Paul Page, Tom Sneva, Bobby Unser, and Danny Sullivan

Chronology
Previous	Next
1996	1998

The 81st Indianapolis 500 was held at the Indianapolis Motor Speedway in Speedway, Indiana, on May 25–27, 1997. The race was scheduled for Sunday May 25, but was postponed until Monday May 26 due to rain. Rain then halted the race after only fifteen laps had been completed. On Tuesday, May 27, the race was resumed and run to completion. Arie Luyendyk won the race from the pole position, his second of two Indy victories (1990, 1997). Treadway Racing, in only their second season of competition, finished 1st–2nd with Luyendyk and Scott Goodyear, the first team to sweep the top two finishing positions at Indianapolis since Leader Cards in 1962. Luyendyk became the first driver since A. J. Foyt to win the race with both a turbocharged and a normally aspirated engine, while Goodyear posted his second runner-up finish (1992). It marked the third time he narrowly lost the "500" in the closing stages.

It was the second Indianapolis 500 held as part of the USAC-sanctioned Indy Racing League, and was part of the 1996–97 Indy Racing League season. It marked the introduction of a production-based, normally aspirated engine formula that reduced speeds from the previous year, and of a new chassis design that was noticeably different mechanically and visually.

A controversy during qualifying saw two bumped cars re-added to the starting field after the time trials. The starting grid consisted of 35 cars, up from the traditional 33. It was the first time 1979, and only the second time since 1933 that more than 33 cars made up the field. However, only 29 cars took the green flag after two failed to start due to mechanical problems, and three others were eliminated in a crash during the pace lap.

With two laps to go in the race, Luyendyk led with Goodyear running second. A caution came out on the 199th lap after Tony Stewart brushed the turn four wall. The pace car did not come out to pack up the field. Drivers and crews expected the race would finish under the caution. Without warning, the green and white flags were displayed at the starter's stand on the final lap, signifying the track was back to racing conditions. None of the drivers in the field were prepared for the restart, and yellow lights around the course remained illuminated for many seconds afterwards. Luyendyk held on to win, but the officials' handling of the situation drew sharp criticism. This incident, followed by a scoring snafu two weeks later at Texas, led the IRL to oust USAC as sanctioning body in favor of in-house officiating.

The win marked the milestone 50th Indianapolis 500 victory for Firestone tires. It was their second in a row, and second since returning to Indy car racing in 1995. Starting in 2000, Firestone would become the lone tire supplier of the series.

== Race schedule ==
The 1997 race was the last to use the three-week/four-weekend, month-of-May schedule (23 days) established in the mid-1970s. Practice started on Saturday, twenty-two days before the race. It was also the last to use the traditional four days of time trials, a format that dated back to 1952.

A few days before the race, a fire swept through the storage hangar housing the floats for the 500 Festival Parade, slated for May 24 in downtown Indianapolis. Only four floats were spared; Buddy Lazier's 1996 winning car escaped the fire only because the museum had decided to wait a few days before delivering it to the float staging area. The parade went on as scheduled, but in a slightly retooled format.

Race schedule — May 1997
Sun	Mon	Tue	Wed	Thu	Fri	Sat
				1	2	3 ROP
4 ROP	5 ROP	6 Practice	7 Practice	8 Practice	9 Practice	10; Pole Day
11; Time Trials	12; Practice	13; Practice	14; Practice	15; Practice	16; Practice	17; Time Trials
18; Bump Day	19	20	21	22; Carb Day	23	24; Testing
25; Indy 500	26; Indy 500	27; Indy 500	28	29	30	31

Color	Notes
Green	Practice
Dark Blue	Time trials
Silver	Race day
Red	Rained out*
Blank	No track activity

* Includes days where track
activity was significantly
limited due to rain

ROP — denotes Rookie
Orientation Program

== Background ==
=== New engine and chassis package ===
The 1997 race featured new engines and new cars under changes to Indy Racing League rules intended to cut costs, lower speeds, and bring the racing cars closer together.

The rules required a switch to a normally aspirated production-based formula with 4.0 L, 32-valve production-based engines from two manufacturers: Oldsmobile Aurora (L47) and Nissan Infiniti (VH).

New chassis rules required parts from Dallara and G-Force. (Riley & Scott also was selected as a chassis manufacturer, but they were not yet ready for competition.) Visible differences from older cars included the airbox above the engine cowling, larger wings, taller sidepods, and an overall bulkier appearance. The new cars produced more downforce than the previous machines, changing the driving characteristics.

Arie Luyendyk, who had set a track record of over 237 mph in 1996, managed just 217 mph in his best 1997 qualifying lap.

With turbochargers legislated out of the series, the 1997 race was the first since the early 1960s to feature a full field of piston-powered, normally aspirated powerplants. The new crossplane crankshaft engines were also much louder than their turbocharged, flat-plane crank counterparts, leading some fans and media to compare them to the sound of NASCAR engines.

=== Track changes ===
The track was repaved in the fall of 1995. After the 1996 Brickyard 400, the apexes of the four turns were breaking up. During the offseason, track crews repaved the apexes with a different compound of asphalt. The result was a better surface, but a visibly darker area in the apexes.

=== Continuing split from CART ===
The ongoing IRL/CART split continued into its second year, and no teams from the CART ranks entered at Indianapolis. With the new IRL chassis and engine rules for 1997, the two series now had substantially different and incompatible equipment. CART-based teams that wished to enter the Indy 500 would henceforth be required to purchase all new cars and engines, and few if any had the interest or the budget to do so. The alternative U.S. 500, however, was cancelled after only one running. Instead of running another race the same day as the Indy 500, CART teams participated in the Motorola 300 at the newly opened Gateway International Raceway on Saturday, May 24, the day before the Indy 500 was scheduled.

The only CART-based team from 1996 that raced at Indy was Galles Racing, which had switched full-time to the IRL during the winter. Robby Gordon, a CART regular from 1992 to 1996, moved to NASCAR in 1997 to drive for Team SABCO, and owner Felix Sabates arranged for Gordon to attempt the "Double Duty", planning to race at Indy and the Coca-Cola 600 in the same day. The effort was well-funded and received considerable media attention. Gordon and Scott Goodyear, who had switched to full-time IRL competition with newcomers Panther Racing, became the first drivers to come back to the Speedway among the 22 starters from 1995 that had not entered the 1996 event; only ten of those 22 would eventually race again at Indy.

On April 11, during a public meeting, Indy Racing League's executive director Leo Mehl stated that CART had pressured in previous years to reduce the Indianapolis 500 to a three-day race, and emphasized that "is a myth that the other side has all the top drivers and you don't have to look very far back into recent history to see a demonstration of that myth. IRL has plenty of top stars to showcase once the press ends its infatuation with propagating opinion instead of facts". Mehl also quoted the creation of the IRL as "necessary", because of stagnant television ratings, NASCAR's rise and the increasing flux of grassroots open wheel drivers into stock car racing.

=== 1996–97 IRL season ===
The IRL made the Indianapolis 500 its final race of its first season, so the IRL champion would be crowned after the race, which might even determine the champion. The second season of the IRL, referred to as the 1996–97 season, was originally to begin at Loudon in August 1996, and conclude with the 1997 Indy 500 in May 1997.

But in October 1996, league officials announced that the series would revert to a traditional calendar-based season. To aid the transition, the 1996–97 season would include the two races run in late 1996 and all races run in the calendar year of 1997. The Indianapolis 500 would no longer serve as the season finale.

=== 25/8 Rule and locked-in entries ===
1997 Indianapolis 500 ticket.

For the second year in a row, 25 of the 33 starting grid positions for the Indianapolis 500 were set aside for the top 25 cars in the 1996-97 season IRL points standings. Known as the "25/8 Rule", the controversial arrangement was introduced during the 1996 IRL season and had been a key reason that CART teams boycotted the 1996 race. IRL officials argued that the rule had already served its purpose of guaranteeing a starting field for other races on the IRL schedule, leaving the door open for its demise in 1998. This was eventually confirmed during the month.

The format, which would be mimicked years later by NASCAR's Top 35 rule, guaranteed a "locked-in" starting position for the top 25 entries in owner points (not drivers), as long as they completed a four-lap qualifying run over a minimum prescribed speed: 203 mph. The grid would still be arranged by speed rank. The remaining eight positions would be filled by non-top 25 entries, and bumping could only occur among those eight positions and the non-top 25 participants.

The #15 and the #74 entries, both raced at the first two races of the 1996-97 season, never appeared during the month of May. Della Penna Motorsports had left the Indy Racing League at the end of calendar year 1996 to compete in CART, while Tempero-Giuffre Racing stayed away from the track despite entering an Infiniti-powered G-Force. Therefore, only 23 of the 25 eligible "locked-in" entries were present to accept their berth, and ten at-large starting positions were up for grabs at the onset of qualifying.

== Entry list ==
The entry list was published on April 21. The 22 cars that had run the first two rounds of the 1997 year were entered, including the #17 Chitwood Motorsports entry, with Affonso Giaffone having been confirmed for the rest of the season, and the #30 McCormack Motorsports car, initially unassigned as Jeret Schroeder hadn't yet struck a financial deal with the team. Out of those 22 cars, only the #16 (Blueprint Racing) and the #50 (EuroInternational) were at-large entries.

Apart from Robby Gordon's entry, eight further driver/car combinations were registered: Eliseo Salazar, back in his full-time ride with Team Scandia, and Lyn St. James were making comeback bids from their injuries, as well as Alessandro Zampedri, who was confirmed back in December and would also stay on Scandia afterwards. Jeff Ward, who failed to qualify for the 1995 race, was signed to drive for Team Cheever's second entry on April 10, while the release of the entry list confirmed the participation of two Indy car debutants: Vincenzo Sospiri, the 1995 Formula 3000 champion and brief Formula 1 driver for the failed MasterCard Lola team, and Greg Ray, third in the 1994 Atlantic Championship and 12th in the previous Indy Lights season. Ray was run by Knapp Motorsports, a spin-off team of the Genoa Racing outfit that was competing in Indy Lights.

Besides, Tyce Carlson was entered by PDM Racing in their second car, and Gary Bettenhausen was announced as the driver of the #81 car, an at-large entry fielded by newcomers Terhune-Barnets Racing and run by LP Racing, in an attempt to make his 22nd Indy 500 start. However, on April 25 he was replaced on the entry list by Mark Dismore, backed by Kelley Automotive Group, who had placed orders on the yet-to-be-delivered chassis from Riley & Scott the previous year.

The team also parted ways with LP Racing and his crew chief Larry Nash, and made a deal with PDM Racing to run the car as his second entry, the #28, which had a locked-in berth. This move left Tyce Carlson out of the ride. Tom Kelley became the owner of the car by the time practice had begun, and the deal with PDM lasted through the season; Kelley Racing would become a fully independent entity in 1998. Stefan Johansson originally planned to race in his own entry, but he gave up earlier in the year due to an injury sustained in a fire at his home, as well as a lack of money. Scott Harrington was entered as his driver in late April.

No.	Driver	Team	Chassis	Engine	Tires	Owner points
1	(United States) Scott Sharp^{1} (replaced by (United States) Johnny O'Connell and by (United States) Paul Durant)	A. J. Foyt Enterprises	G Force GF01	Oldsmobile	Goodyear	104
2	(United States) Tony Stewart	Team Menard	G Force GF01	Oldsmobile	Firestone^{2}	101
3	(United States) Robbie Buhl	Team Menard	G Force GF01	Oldsmobile	Firestone^{2}	50
4	(Sweden) Kenny Bräck R	Galles Racing	G Force GF01	Oldsmobile	Goodyear	43
5	(Netherlands) Arie Luyendyk W	Treadway Racing	G Force GF01	Oldsmobile	Firestone	75
6	(Canada) Scott Goodyear	Treadway Racing	G Force GF01	Oldsmobile	Firestone	73
7	(Chile) Eliseo Salazar	Team Scandia	Dallara IR7	Oldsmobile	Goodyear	54
8	(Italy) Vincenzo Sospiri R	Team Scandia	Dallara IR7	Oldsmobile	Goodyear	9
9	(United States) Johnny Unser^{3}	Hemelgarn Racing	Dallara IR7	Infiniti	Firestone	25
10	(United States) Mike Groff	Byrd-Cunningham Racing	G Force GF01	Infiniti	Firestone	125
11	(United States) Billy Boat^{4} R	A. J. Foyt Enterprises	Dallara IR7	Oldsmobile	Goodyear	—
12	(United States) Buzz Calkins	Bradley Motorsports	G Force GF01	Oldsmobile	Goodyear	113
14	(United States) Davey Hamilton	A. J. Foyt Enterprises	G Force GF01	Oldsmobile	Goodyear	114
15	(vacant)	Tempero/Giuffre Racing	G Force GF01	Infiniti	Goodyear	34
16	(United States) Sam Schmidt R	Blueprint Racing	Dallara IR7	Oldsmobile	Firestone	32
17	(Brazil) Affonso Giaffone R	Chitwood Motorsports	Dallara IR7	Oldsmobile	Goodyear	44
18	(United States) John Paul Jr.^{5} (replaced by (United States) Tyce Carlson R )	PDM Racing	Dallara IR7	Oldsmobile	Goodyear	88
21	(Colombia) Roberto Guerrero	Pagan Racing	Dallara IR7	Infiniti	Goodyear	106
22	(Brazil) Marco Greco	Team Scandia	Dallara IR7	Oldsmobile	Goodyear	118
27	(United States) Jim Guthrie	Blueprint Racing	Dallara IR7	Oldsmobile	Firestone	98
28	(United States) Mark Dismore	Kelley Racing - PDM	Dallara IR7	Oldsmobile	Goodyear	36
30	(United States) Robbie Groff R	McCormack Motorsports	G Force GF01	Oldsmobile	Goodyear	73
33	(Spain) Fermín Vélez	Team Scandia	Dallara IR7	Oldsmobile	Goodyear	109
34	(Italy) Alessandro Zampedri	Team Scandia	Dallara IR7	Oldsmobile	Goodyear	25
36	(United States) Scott Harrington	Johansson Motorsports	Dallara IR7^{6}	Oldsmobile^{6}	Goodyear^{6}	—
40	(United States) Jack Miller R	Arizona Motorsports	Dallara IR7	Infiniti	Firestone	89
42	(United States) Robby Gordon	Team SABCO	G Force GF01	Oldsmobile	Goodyear	—
44	(United States) Steve Kinser^{7} R	Sinden Racing Services	Dallara IR7	Oldsmobile	Goodyear	—
50	(United States) Billy Roe R	EuroInternational	Dallara IR7	Oldsmobile	Firestone	20
51	(United States) Eddie Cheever	Team Cheever	G Force GF01	Oldsmobile	Goodyear	88
52	(United States) Jeff Ward R	Team Cheever	G Force GF01	Oldsmobile	Goodyear	—
54	(United States) Dennis Vitolo^{8}	Beck Motorsports	Dallara IR7	Infiniti	Firestone	40
72	(Canada) Claude Bourbonnais^{9} R	Blueprint Racing	Dallara IR7	Oldsmobile	Firestone	—
77	(France) Stéphan Grégoire	Chastain Motorsports	G Force GF01	Oldsmobile	Goodyear	46
90	(United States) Lyn St. James	Hemelgarn Racing	Dallara IR7	Infiniti	Firestone	—
91	(United States) Buddy Lazier W	Hemelgarn Racing	Dallara IR7	Oldsmobile^{10}	Firestone	71
97	(United States) Greg Ray R	Knapp Motorsports	Dallara IR7	Oldsmobile	Firestone	—
Locked-in entry that was not entered
74	(not entered)	Della Penna Motorsports	—	—	—	57

Entries that were not locked-in for the race.

- W Former winner
- R Indy 500 Rookie
1. Entered on Bump Day. Scott Sharp, the entry's original driver, was injured in a crash on May 9. Johnny O'Connell, entered on May 13, was also injured in a crash on May 16.
2. Switched to Goodyear tires before the start of practice, and went back to Firestones on May 8.
3. Entered on May 10.
4. Entered on May 9.
5. Entered on May 13. John Paul Jr., the entry's original driver, was injured in a crash on May 9.
6. Tried to qualify with a chassis from A. J. Foyt Enterprises. His original combination was a G Force GF01 chassis with Infiniti engine and Firestone tires.
7. Entered on May 6.
8. Entered on May 11.
9. Entered on May 15.
10. Switched from Infiniti engines on May 10.

== Practice (week 1) ==
=== Saturday May 3 - Opening Day ===
The first day of practice, set aside for Rookie Orientation, was rained out.

=== Sunday May 4 - Rookie Orientation ===
The first day of track activity saw six rookies take laps, with Vincenzo Sospiri leading the speed chart at 211.964 mph. Jack Miller blew an engine, in what was the only remarkable incident of the day. Robbie Groff also took laps for McCormack Motorsports, as the former Indy Lights driver, with two CART races under his belt back in 1994, had struck a deal to drive with the team, in detriment of Jeret Schroeder.

In a press conference, Team Menard confirmed that Tony Stewart would continue with the team for the remainder of the 1996-97 season year and for 1998. The lengthening of the season, devised to switch to a calendar schedule for 1998, meant a new deal had to be reached in order for Stewart to finalize his NASCAR Busch Series outings. Stewart had already signed a full-season deal with Joe Gibbs Racing for 1998, and had his sights in a Winston Cup ride for 1999. Menard also confirmed a switch from Firestone to Goodyear tires.

Top practice speeds
Pos	No.	Driver	Team	Chassis	Engine	Speed
1	8	(Italy) Vincenzo Sospiri R	Team Scandia	Dallara	Oldsmobile	211.964
2	51	(United States) Jeff Ward R	Team Cheever	G-Force	Oldsmobile	205.780
3	4	(Sweden) Kenny Bräck R	Galles Racing	G-Force	Oldsmobile	204.997

=== Monday May 5 - Rookie Orientation ===
A very windy day saw minimal activity, with only four cars taking a total of 80 laps before rain closed the track at 4:30 p.m. Kenny Bräck turned the fastest lap at 205.597 mph.

Top practice speeds
Pos	No.	Driver	Team	Chassis	Engine	Speed
1	4	(Sweden) Kenny Bräck R	Galles Racing	G-Force	Oldsmobile	205.597
2	16	(United States) Sam Schmidt R	Blueprint Racing	Dallara	Oldsmobile	198.325
3	97	(United States) Greg Ray R	Knapp Motorsports	Dallara	Oldsmobile	185.494

=== Tuesday May 6 ===
The first full day of practice saw heavy activity. Arie Luyendyk set the fastest lap thus far of the month at 5:24 p.m., at 218.707 mph. The only incident of the day occurred early on, when rookie Jeff Ward blew an engine and spun into the wall in turn 3.

Later on, five rookies (Kenny Bräck, Robbie Groff, Greg Ray, Vincenzo Sospiri and Affonso Giaffone) completed their rookie test, and Sinden Racing Services confirmed that Steve Kinser, a 14-times World of Outlaws sprint car champion, would drive their #44 at-large entry. Kinser had tried to qualify for the race 15 years earlier, when a practice crash ended his chances in 1981, and had never competed in an Indy car race.

John Andretti, a seven-time Indianapolis 500 starter between 1988 and 1994, passed the mandatory physical exam. Andretti, who switched to NASCAR Winston Cup in 1994 and was driving for Cale Yarborough Motorsports, had expressed an interest in doing the Double Duty for the second time.

Top practice speeds
Pos	No.	Driver	Team	Chassis	Engine	Speed
1	5	(Netherlands) Arie Luyendyk	Treadway Racing	G-Force	Oldsmobile	218.797
2	42	(United States) Robby Gordon	Team SABCO	G-Force	Oldsmobile	215.569
3	2	(United States) Tony Stewart	Team Menard	G-Force	Oldsmobile	214.337

=== Wednesday May 7 ===
Arie Luyendyk became the first and only driver to go over 220 mph during the month, with a lap of 220.297 mph. At 4:12 p.m., Scott Sharp crashed in turn 1, heavily damaging his primary car. He had just run a lap of 217.402 mph.

Lyn St. James's 34 laps were her first on a race car since her collision at the previous year's Indy 500, as her broken right wrist had healed improperly. The rain closed the track about 10 minutes early.

Top practice speeds
Pos	No.	Driver	Team	Chassis	Engine	Speed
1	5	(Netherlands) Arie Luyendyk	Treadway Racing	G-Force	Oldsmobile	220.297
2	1	(United States) Scott Sharp	A. J. Foyt Enterprises	G-Force	Oldsmobile	217.402
3	27	(United States) Jim Guthrie	Blueprint Racing	Dallara	Oldsmobile	216.076

=== Thursday May 8 ===
Rain kept the track closed until 3 p.m., and the final three hours saw average activity, including the first laps for Steve Kinser and Stéphan Grégoire. Just minutes after the track opened, Arie Luyendyk spun in the southchute, and tagged the wall, suffering minor nose cone damage. He was uninjured. Later, Luyendyk returned to the track, and once again, led the speed chart at 217.318 mph.

In the later stages of the day, Alessandro Zampedri's car caught fire, having blown an engine coming out of Turn 4. After struggling to compete for the top spots during two days of practice with Goodyear tires, Team Menard switched back to mounting compounds from Firestone. Right away, Tony Stewart and Robbie Buhl were able to challenge Luyendyk's lap times, ending the session just behind him.

Top practice speeds
Pos	No.	Driver	Team	Chassis	Engine	Speed
1	5	(Netherlands) Arie Luyendyk	Treadway Racing	G-Force	Oldsmobile	217.318
2	2T	(United States) Tony Stewart	Team Menard	G-Force	Oldsmobile	215.822
3	3T	(United States) Robbie Buhl	Team Menard	G-Force	Oldsmobile	215.708

=== "Fast" Friday May 9 ===
The final day of practice before pole qualifying saw heavy action and cool temperatures. The speed chart was competitive, with Arie Luyendyk, Tony Stewart, and Robbie Buhl trading fast laps for the afternoon. At the end of the day, Luyendyk was fastest, sweeping the chart all four days of veteran practice. His lap of 218.325 mph was a mile per hour faster than Stewart in second place.

Two incidents, however, overshadowed the action. At 12:42 p.m., John Paul Jr. crashed in Turn 4, and suffered a broken lower right leg and a broken left heel. With 43 minutes left, Scott Sharp also crashed exiting Turn 4, and suffered a concussion. Sharp had been knocked unconscious in the crash with his foot on the throttle, and the destroyed car kept going for a while in the front stretch alongside the outside wall with its wheels spinning. Both Paul and Sharp would be forced to sit out the rest of the month. In another incident, Stéphan Grégoire's car suffered minor damage against the inside guard rail after a spin in the warm-up lane.

During the day, Jack Miller, Steve Kinser and Sam Schmidt passed the final phases of their rookie tests, Jeff Ward completed his 20-lap refresher test, and driver-owner Eddie Cheever turned his first laps of the month, having concentrated so far in getting Ward's car up to speed. EuroInternational also completed their first laps with Billy Roe, albeit at a slow speed. With them, 30 of the 32 confirmed car-driver combinations had taken to the track before Pole Day qualifying, the exceptions being Mark Dismore due to the lateness of the ownership and crew switch in the #28 entry, and Scott Harrington, as Johansson Motorsports saw its Oldsmobile engine deal being scuppered.

Besides Harrington, some Oldsmobile entries were experiencing engine shortages. After Jim Guthrie had a timing chain failure, Blueprint Racing was left with no powerplants available, as the three engines they had put a deposit on had not been delivered. Team Menard refused to supply them, having previously committed to Steve Kinser for technical assistance. Other Aurora-supplied teams also faced similar issues, like Team Scandia, which was switching their few engines between their entries.

Top practice speeds
Pos	No.	Driver	Team	Chassis	Engine	Speed
1	5	(Netherlands) Arie Luyendyk	Treadway Racing	G-Force	Oldsmobile	218.325
2	2	(United States) Tony Stewart	Team Menard	G-Force	Oldsmobile	217.355
3	3	(United States) Robbie Buhl	Team Menard	G-Force	Oldsmobile	216.899

== Time trials (weekend 1) ==
=== Pole Day - Saturday May 10 ===
Pole day time trials took place under mostly sunny skies, but cool temperatures, which forced the Pole Day morning practice to be delayed due to low track temperature for the first time in history. Tony Stewart led the charts at 219.085 mph.

After two days of on-truck struggles in the 209 mph range, Hemelgarn Racing announced Saturday morning that Buddy Lazier would use Oldsmobile powerplants instead of Infiniti's, citing a lack of speed and sponsor deference. Due to contractual obligations on fielding a second Infiniti engine, the team entered Johnny Unser to drive in Lazier's car, renumbered as #90, while Lazier would qualify with his back-up. Because of the shortages being faced from Oldsmobile, their first Aurora engine was loaned by driver-owner Stan Wattles, whose upstart operation Metro Racing Systems was yet in the planning process.

The first car out on the track to qualify was Mike Groff. He became the first driver to complete a run in a normally aspirated car since 1987, and the first to qualify one since 1984. His speed also tentatively broke existing normally aspirated, stock block, track records with an average of 208.537 mph. A total of nine cars went out for runs during the first segment, however, only five were run to completion. Jeff Ward sat on the provisional pole at 214.517 mph, which would eventually be good for seventh on the grid.

Shortly after 3 p.m., Arie Luyendyk took to the track and began the second wave of qualifiers. His run of 218.263 mph put him firmly in pole position, with Tony Stewart close behind at 218.021 mph. Rookie Vincenzo Sospiri surprised many by rounding out the front row at 216.822 mph, beating Robbie Buhl, who qualified on his third attempt, Scott Goodyear and Jim Guthrie, who was on a popularity peak after his surprise Phoenix 200 win and had run competitively during the week. Guthrie had been able to qualify after a long overnight rebuild of his lone engine.

With his new engine, Buddy Lazier substantially improved his pace to qualify in the top 10. There were several wave-offs during qualifying attempts, and three drivers didn't get to complete theirs. Robbie Groff brushed the wall at the exit of Turn 1 in his second lap and had to wave off, Fermín Vélez blew an engine during his second lap, and Sam Schmidt spun on the warm-up lane, hitting the inside wall. Also, Eliseo Salazar had to wave off his first qualifying attempt after hitting a bird on Lap 3.

At the end of pole day, 21 cars were in the field, with Roberto Guerrero slowest thus far at just over 207 mph. The Colombian qualified with his back-up car, which left him without his locked-in status, but Pagan's team manager John Barnes, had petitioned for it to become the primary car while it was already in the qualifying lane. The change was not made before Guerrero took to the track, but USAC allowed it to be considered as a primary car the following day, securing Guerrero's place in the grid. That decision put Alessandro Zampedri in an early bubble among the at-large entries, having qualified at barely 209 mph. A week later, during Bump Day, USAC allowed a similar change to Buddy Lazier's car at the request of Ron Hemelgarn, despite being safely in the field at 214.286 mph.

Pole Day
Pos.	No.	Driver	Team	Chassis	Engine	Speed	Entry status
1	5	(Netherlands) Arie Luyendyk	Treadway Racing	G-Force	Oldsmobile	218.263	Locked-in
2	2	(United States) Tony Stewart	Team Menard	G-Force	Oldsmobile	218.021	Locked-in
3	8	(Italy) Vincenzo Sospiri R	Team Scandia	Dallara	Oldsmobile	216.822	At-large
4	3	(United States) Robbie Buhl	Team Menard	G-Force	Oldsmobile	216.102	Locked-in
5	6	(Canada) Scott Goodyear	Treadway Racing	G-Force	Oldsmobile	215.811	Locked-in
6	27	(United States) Jim Guthrie	Blueprint Racing	Dallara	Oldsmobile	215.207	Locked-in
7	52	(United States) Jeff Ward R	Team Cheever	G-Force	Oldsmobile	214.517	At-large
8	14	(United States) Davey Hamilton	A. J. Foyt Enterprises	G-Force	Oldsmobile	214.484	Locked-in
9	7	(Chile) Eliseo Salazar	Team Scandia	Dallara	Oldsmobile	214.320	Locked-in
10	91	(United States) Buddy Lazier	Hemelgarn Racing	Dallara	Oldsmobile	214.286	Locked-in^{1}
11	51	(United States) Eddie Cheever	Team Cheever	G-Force	Oldsmobile	214.073	Locked-in
12	42	(United States) Robby Gordon	Team SABCO	G-Force	Oldsmobile	213.211	At-large
13	77	(France) Stéphan Grégoire	Chastain Motorsports	G-Force	Oldsmobile	213.126	Locked-in
14	17	(Brazil) Affonso Giaffone R	Chitwood Motorsports	Dallara	Oldsmobile	212.974	Locked-in
15	4	(Sweden) Kenny Bräck R	Galles Racing	G-Force	Oldsmobile	211.221	Locked-in
^{2}	90	(United States) Lyn St. James	Hemelgarn Racing	Dallara	Infiniti	210.145	At-large
16	12	(United States) Buzz Calkins	Bradley Motorsports	G-Force	Oldsmobile	209.564	Locked-in
17	40	(United States) Jack Miller R	Arizona Motorsports	Dallara	Infiniti	209.250	Locked-in
^{2}	34	(Italy) Alessandro Zampedri	Team Scandia	Dallara	Oldsmobile	209.094	At-large
18	10	(United States) Mike Groff	Byrd-Cunningham Racing	G-Force	Infiniti	208.537	Locked-in
19	21	(Colombia) Roberto Guerrero	Pagan Racing	Dallara	Infiniti	207.371	Locked-in^{1}
	33	(Spain) Fermín Vélez	Team Scandia	Dallara	Oldsmobile	Engine trouble	Locked-in
	30	(United States) Robbie Groff R	McCormack Motorsports	G-Force	Oldsmobile	Waved off	Locked-in
	16	(United States) Sam Schmidt R	Blueprint Racing	Dallara	Oldsmobile	Crashed	At-large

1. Qualified as an at-large entry, before his status was reversed.
2. Bumped from the field by other at-large entries on Bump Day.

=== Second Day - Sunday May 11 ===
As the majority of drivers had qualified by Saturday, only four machines started qualifying attempts on the second day. Two of them were added to the field; Steve Kinser completed a run early in the day, while Robbie Groff finished just before the track closed in his last attempt. The first one was nullified by an engine misfire, and the second by a cold track surface. Greg Ray, in an at-large entry, was set for a 215 mph qualifying run before he ran out of fuel in his last lap. The priority in engine usage at Team Scandia forced Marco Greco to become the only available first-week competitor to sit out during Pole Day weekend.

In the morning, Dennis Vitolo was assigned to the #54 Beck Motorsports entry, which had a locked-in berth after being raced by Robbie Buhl in the last two rounds of 1996. Billy Boat, who failed to qualify in 1996 and was yet to debut in an Indy car race, had been recruited on Friday to drive Foyt's third car, and took to the track for the first time in the #1T car. Billy Boat even took warm-up laps for a tentative late qualifying attempt, with the only purpose of checking some changes to the car. Despite this, his deal had been agreed before Sharp's injury, and he was not slated to replace him.

Second Day
Pos.	No.	Driver	Team	Chassis	Engine	Speed	Entry status
20	44	(United States) Steve Kinser R	Sinden Racing Services	Dallara	Oldsmobile	210.793	At-large
21	30	(United States) Robbie Groff R	McCormack Motorsports	G-Force	Oldsmobile	207.792	Locked-in
	97	(United States) Greg Ray R	Knapp Motorsports	Dallara	Oldsmobile	Out of fuel	At-large
	1T	(United States) Billy Boat R	A. J. Foyt Enterprises	Dallara	Oldsmobile	Warm-up laps	At-large

== Practice (week 2) ==
=== Monday May 12 ===
Another cool and windy day saw 18 cars practice. Arie Luyendyk continued his dominance and led the practice chart for the seventh consecutive day before sitting out for the rest of the week. He did not come back on track until Bump Day practice, which he also led. Billy Boat was able to complete his refresher test, while Billy Roe became the ninth driver to pass his rookie test.

Off the track, A. J. Foyt announced that he was working on a deal for John Andretti to replace the injured Scott Sharp in the #1 entry, providing that travel and scheduling constraints were arranged with his NASCAR team owner Cale Yarborough. Johansson Motorsports confirmed they would use an Infiniti engine provided by Hemelgarn Racing, after plans to run an Oldsmobile engine for Scott Harrington fell through.

Top practice speeds
Pos	No.	Driver	Team	Chassis	Engine	Speed
1	5	(Netherlands) Arie Luyendyk	Treadway Racing	G-Force	Oldsmobile	217.103
2	6	(Canada) Scott Goodyear	Treadway Racing	G-Force	Oldsmobile	216.092
3	51	(United States) Eddie Cheever	Team Cheever	G-Force	Oldsmobile	215.600

=== Tuesday May 13 ===
Ten drivers turned their fastest laps of the month, including Buddy Lazier, who led the speed chart, and Billy Boat, the fastest of the non-qualified cars. At over 214 mph, Boat was four miles per hour faster than the others, including Dennis Vitolo, who blew an engine before getting up to speed.

A. J. Foyt conceded defeat in his intentions to bring John Andretti as a driver, as his NASCAR commitment with Cale Yarborough would not provide enough travel time to make it to the Coca-Cola 600. Johnny O'Connell was named to replace Scott Sharp in the #1 car, and PDM Racing confirmed Tyce Carlson to replace the injured John Paul Jr. in the #18 car. Carlson had run two races with the team in 1996, and had been scheduled to make the Indy 500 in the #28 until Mark Dismore's deal was arranged in late April.

Top practice speeds
Pos	No.	Driver	Team	Chassis	Engine	Speed
1	91T	(United States) Buddy Lazier	Hemelgarn Racing	Dallara	Oldsmobile	217.040
2	51	(United States) Eddie Cheever	Team Cheever	G-Force	Oldsmobile	216.909
3	6	(Canada) Scott Goodyear	Treadway Racing	G-Force	Oldsmobile	216.513

=== Wednesday May 14 ===
Buddy Lazier and Billy Boat repeated their efforts from the previous day, as the fastest already-qualified and fastest non-qualified cars of the day. High winds blew debris onto the track, causing several yellow lights throughout the afternoon.

Top practice speeds
Pos	No.	Driver	Team	Chassis	Engine	Speed
1	91T	(United States) Buddy Lazier	Hemelgarn Racing	Dallara	Oldsmobile	216.570
2	2T	(United States) Tony Stewart	Team Menard	G-Force	Oldsmobile	216.466
3	14	(United States) Davey Hamilton	A. J. Foyt Enterprises	G-Force	Oldsmobile	215.972

=== Thursday May 15 ===
Most of the cars that took to the track were among those not yet qualified. Several veterans sat out the afternoon. Sam Schmidt found his way to the top of the speed chart, at over 211 mph. His team, Blueprint Racing, confirmed a third entry for Claude Bourbonnais, the 1993 Atlantic Championship runner-up and fourth in the 1996 Indy Lights season, who had run five CART races in 1994. Bourbonnais was due to take over Jim Guthrie's back-up car.

Like the Canadian, Johnny Unser and Johnny O'Connell run laps over 200 mph, also taking to the track for the first time all month, as well as Mark Dismore and his new teammate Tyce Carlson, who passed his refresher test. In a windy day, both drivers got to do laps in the 210 mph range early in the day before parking the cars early, as PDM Racing was out of spare engines.

Top practice speeds
Pos	No.	Driver	Team	Chassis	Engine	Speed
1	16	(United States) Sam Schmidt R	Blueprint Racing	Dallara	Oldsmobile	211.989
2	14T	(United States) Davey Hamilton	A. J. Foyt Enterprises	Dallara	Oldsmobile	211.456
3	42	(United States) Robby Gordon	Team SABCO	G-Force	Oldsmobile	211.164

=== Friday May 16 ===
The final full day of practice saw heavy activity among qualified and non-qualified drivers. With Arie Luyendyk still absent, Tony Stewart led the speed chart. During the first hour, Johnny O'Connell lost an engine and crashed hard in the southchute. He dislocated his left foot and was ruled out for the weekend, becoming the second Foyt driver to be sidelined during the month. Later that afternoon, Claude Bourbonnais was the tenth and last driver to complete his rookie test, and Scott Harrington finally took his first laps of the month.

Among the unqualified cars, both Greg Ray and Fermín Vélez went back on track for the first time since Pole Day weekend. Meanwhile, the three already qualified drivers from Team Scandia sat out the whole week of practice because of the lingering engine parts shortages, including Alessandro Zampedri, despite his bubble spot. This reduced running for both Marco Greco and Vélez to a combined 47 laps. Similar issues also kept Jim Guthrie off the track during the week. Up to six locked-in entries were yet to qualify, and the remaining seven un-qualified cars were set to battle on time trials, as well as the slower at-large qualifiers of Pole Day weekend (Steve Kinser, Lyn St. James and Zampedri), as four open spots were still up for grabs.

Off the track, the Indy Racing League confirmed the technical specifications for 1998 and beyond, which included the elimination of the 25/8 Rule, which had grown in controversy beyond its alleged CART-blocking purposes. During the week, competitors and officials alike were growing apprehensive of the rule, as it became increasingly possible that the "fastest 33 cars", a cornerstone Indy tradition, could not necessarily make the field. At-large entries were expected to be over 210 mph to make the race, while four locked-in entries had settled with just being over the 203 mph minimum speed required. There had also been some disconformity with some teams that were selling, or trying to sell, their locked-in berths.

Top practice speeds
Pos	No.	Driver	Team	Chassis	Engine	Speed
1	2T	(United States) Tony Stewart	Team Menard	G-Force	Oldsmobile	216.388
2	4T	(Sweden) Kenny Bräck R	Galles Racing	G-Force	Oldsmobile	215.074
3	97	(United States) Greg Ray R	Knapp Motorsports	Dallara	Oldsmobile	215.069

== Time trials (weekend 2) ==
=== Third Day - Saturday May 17 ===
The third day of qualifying saw sunny skies and warm temperatures. A busy day of time trials saw the field fill to 31 cars. Billy Boat set the early pace with an average of 215.544 mph, sixth fastest on the whole grid and faster than team leader Davey Hamilton. Several "locked-in" drivers took runs, and within an hour, eight consecutive time trials were run to completion, including another 215 mph run by Sam Schmidt which closely mirrored that of the sister car of Jim Guthrie. Johnny Unser couldn't attempt to qualify after a piston failed in the morning practice, Greg Ray suffered an engine failure during his warm-up lap and Claude Bourbonnais, looking to qualify on the later stages of the day, damaged his car after tagging the wall twice.

When the track closed for the day, only two positions were unfilled, and 22 of the 23 original "locked-in" entries were already in the field. The only original "locked-in" entry yet unqualified was the #1 of A. J. Foyt Enterprises, which had no driver after the injuries suffered by Scott Sharp and Johnny O'Connell. Foyt had previously discarded using that berth for Boat, and told reporters he would not sign another replacement driver, reducing the number of cars yet to qualify on Bump Day to just four.

Third Day
Pos.	No.	Driver	Team	Chassis	Engine	Speed	Entry status
22	11	(United States) Billy Boat R	A. J. Foyt Enterprises	Dallara	Oldsmobile	215.544	At-large
23	16	(United States) Sam Schmidt R	Blueprint Racing	Dallara	Oldsmobile	215.141	At-large
24	50	(United States) Billy Roe R	EuroInternational	Dallara	Oldsmobile	212.752	At-large
25	28	(United States) Mark Dismore	Kelley Racing - PDM	Dallara	Oldsmobile	212.423	Locked-in
26	18	(United States) Tyce Carlson R	PDM Racing	Dallara	Oldsmobile	210.852	Locked-in
27	22	(Brazil) Marco Greco	Team Scandia	Dallara	Oldsmobile	210.322	Locked-in
28	54	(United States) Dennis Vitolo	Beck Motorsports	Dallara	Infiniti	207.626	Locked-in
29	33	(Spain) Fermín Vélez	Team Scandia	Dallara	Oldsmobile	206.512	Locked-in
	97	(United States) Greg Ray R	Knapp Motorsports	Dallara	Oldsmobile	engine trouble	At-large

=== Bump Day - Sunday May 18 ===
Going into the final day of qualifying, two positions were open. One final "locked-in" position was available (Foyt's #1), as 22 of the 23 eligible cars had already completed their runs. Once the field was filled to 33 cars, the ten "non-exempt" positions were all up for grabs among the at-large entries. On Bump Day morning, several non-exempt teams were uneasy about their chances of making the field, despite their speeds being amongst the fastest 33. Despite his earlier remarks about not qualifying the #1 car, Foyt sent team driver Davey Hamilton out to shake the car down.

In the first fifteen minutes, Johnny Unser (209.344 mph) and Greg Ray (213.760 mph) filled the field to 33 cars with at-large entries. Since 22 of the cars were locked-in, they put Alessandro Zampedri on the bubble. Zampedri had qualified 19th on pole day with a 209.09 mph, and was the 28th-fastest car on speed at the time, ahead of five "locked-in" cars.

At 11.30 a.m., Paul Durant secured a drive in the #1 Foyt car, the final entry eligible for a locked-in position. Durant, who had not run during the whole month, climbed into the car for the first time at 12:17 p.m., and was safely in the field by 1:09 p.m. His qualifying average of 209.149 mph bumped Zampedri from the field of 33. Durant's only previous IRL experience consisted of two early retirements in 1996, one of them at the Indy 500.

Johnny Unser was now on the bubble with the 26th-fastest car in the field, as the slowest at-large entry. At 2:08 p.m., Claude Bourbonnais easily bumped out Unser with a 210.523 mph qualifying attempt, and put Lyn St. James on the bubble. She had qualified 16th on pole day, was 25th-fastest overall and the fastest Infiniti-powered car, but the eight cars below her were locked in. Immediately after Bourbonnais' attempt, and with rain approaching, Alessandro Zampedri took to the track in his backup car. His run of 211.757 mph was enough to bump St. James and put Bourbonnais on the bubble.

Minutes later, rain began to fall and closed the track for the next hour. Despite being bumped, Hemelgarn Racing (which fielded both Unser and St. James) were making no effort to bring their cars back out on the track to re-qualify. In a 2017 interview, St. James said that she confronted IRL official Leo Mehl about the situation, but received an inattentive response. She also pleaded with car owner Ron Hemelgarn, who seemed to her as "curiously unconcerned". Rumors had already begun circulating around the garage area that USAC officials were considering reinstating bumped cars to the field, which was relayed on the ESPN broadcast.

The track was dried and re-opened at 3:15 p.m, with Scott Harrington as the lone car preparing to qualify. Unable to go over 200 mph during practice on Saturday, Johansson Motorsports took possession of Davey Hamilton's back-up chassis from Foyt, and changed its number to #36 to make it their primary car. With just 25 practice laps in the car, Harrington got out to qualify at 5:51 p.m, with nine minutes left in the day. After a quick first lap of 214.061 mph, he crashed heavily after losing control in the middle of turn 2. Harrington, who was extricated from his car, was awake and alert, and was transferred to Methodist Hospital, but was not seriously injured.

==== Post-qualifying ====
When the closing gun was fired at 6 p.m., Hemelgarn Racing teammates Lyn St. James and Johnny Unser were the lone two drivers to have been bumped out of the starting field. Both of them, like Alessandro Zampedri before he managed to re-qualify, had posted qualifying speeds among the fastest 33 cars. They were also faster than eight of the "locked-in" entries.

USAC officials had previously expressed their concern that, due to the soon-to-be-abandoned '25/8 Rule', the fastest 33 cars would not be starting the race. Eventually, a decision was made that afternoon to reinstate any at-large entries that were bumped, provided they were among the "fastest 33" cars overall. The ruling added St. James and Unser back to the field, being placed in the 34th and 35th starting positions, respectively. It was the first time since 1979 that the field would be larger than the traditional 33 cars.

With 13 rookies, it was the second-most number of rookies since 1930, behind only the previous year's race. With nine of the 17 rookies from 1996 also in the field, only 13 drivers had taken part in the Indianapolis 500 prior to the formation of the IRL. Scott Harrington was the lone driver who failed to qualify.

Bump Day
Pos.	No.	Driver	Team	Chassis	Engine	Speed	Entry status
30	97	(United States) Greg Ray R	Knapp Motorsports	Dallara	Oldsmobile	213.760	At-large
31	34	(Italy) Alessandro Zampedri	Team Scandia	Dallara	Oldsmobile	211.757	At-large
32	72	(Canada) Claude Bourbonnais R	Blueprint Racing	Dallara	Oldsmobile	210.523	At-large
33	1	(United States) Paul Durant	A. J. Foyt Enterprises	G-Force	Oldsmobile	209.149	Locked-in
Reinstated
34	90	(United States) Lyn St. James	Hemelgarn Racing	Dallara	Infiniti	210.145	At-large
35	9	(United States) Johnny Unser	Hemelgarn Racing	Dallara	Infiniti	209.344	At-large
Failed to qualify
	36	(United States) Scott Harrington	Johansson Motorsports	Dallara	Oldsmobile	Crashed	At-large

== Carburetion Day ==
=== Final practice - Thursday May 22 ===
Tony Stewart turned the fastest lap of the day, at 215.502 mph., while polesitter Arie Luyendyk completed only two laps at speed, using the session mostly as a system check exercise.

Robby Gordon blew an engine, while Dennis Vitolo, Marco Greco and Paul Durant experienced mechanical trouble.

Top practice speeds
Pos	No.	Driver	Team	Chassis	Engine	Speed
1	2	(United States) Tony Stewart	Team Menard	G-Force	Oldsmobile	215.502
2	97	(United States) Greg Ray R	Knapp Motorsports	Dallara	Oldsmobile	214.807
3	6	(Canada) Scott Goodyear	Treadway Racing	G-Force	Oldsmobile	212.972

=== Pit Stop Challenge ===
The 21st annual Coors Pit Stop Challenge was held Thursday, May 22. Eight teams competed for a $40,000 top prize. The race pole sitter (Arie Luyendyk) was automatically qualified, and four additional entries were selected through an Indy Racing League "program" at Walt Disney World (Marco Greco, Jim Guthrie) and Phoenix (Davey Hamilton, Stéphan Grégoire).

The last three berths were determined during a preliminary round on May 12. Seven entries participated, racing against the clock in a single-run format. Kenny Bräck (12.597 seconds), Robby Gordon (13.721 seconds) and Eddie Cheever (14.409 seconds) advanced to the competition. Failed to qualify were: Steve Kinser (14.721 seconds), Jeff Ward (15.447 seconds), Jack Miller (17.245 seconds) and Roberto Guerrero, who failed to register a time. However, both Hamilton and Grégoire's entries were withdrawn by Foyt and Chastain from the competition. Kinser and Ward were subsequently elevated into the elimination bracket.

Galles Racing and driver Kenny Bräck defeated Team Cheever with driver/owner Eddie Cheever in the finals. It was the second win in a row for Galles, and the fifth victory overall in the event.

Quarterfinals
22	Marco Greco (Team Scandia)	16.863
44	Steve Kinser (Sinden Racing Services)	DQ
4	Kenny Bräck (Galles Racing)	13.330
42	Robby Gordon (Team SABCO)	14.274
51	Eddie Cheever (Team Cheever)	15.247
5	Arie Luyendyk (Treadway Racing)	17.521
52	Jeff Ward (Team Cheever)	N/A
27	Jim Guthrie (Blueprint Racing)	Withdrew

Semifinals
22	Marco Greco (Team Scandia)	20.833
4	Kenny Bräck (Galles Racing)	17.096
51	Eddie Cheever (Team Cheever)	17.305
52	Jeff Ward (Team Cheever)	DQ

Finals
4	Kenny Bräck (Galles Racing)	14.284
51	Eddie Cheever (Team Cheever)	15.133

=== System check runs ===
On Saturday, May 24, the day before the race, arrangements were made for a special practice session. Due to the new engine package, some teams had requested additional track time for system check runs. A very brief green light period, with a 190 mph speed limit, was conducted for five cars.

== Starting grid ==
Row	Inside	Middle	Outside
1	(Netherlands) 5 - Arie Luyendyk W	(United States) 2 - Tony Stewart	(Italy) 8 - Vincenzo Sospiri R
2	(United States) 3 - Robbie Buhl	(Canada) 6 - Scott Goodyear	(United States) 27 - Jim Guthrie
3	(United States) 52 - Jeff Ward R	(United States) 14 - Davey Hamilton	(Chile) 7 - Eliseo Salazar
4	(United States) 91 - Buddy Lazier W	(United States) 51 - Eddie Cheever	(United States) 42 - Robby Gordon
5	(France) 77 - Stéphan Grégoire	(Brazil) 17 - Affonso Giaffone R	(Sweden) 4 - Kenny Bräck R
6	(United States) 12 - Buzz Calkins	(United States) 40 - Dr. Jack Miller R	(United States) 10 - Mike Groff
7	(Colombia) 21 - Roberto Guerrero	(United States) 44 - Steve Kinser R	(United States) 30 - Robbie Groff R
8	(United States) 11 - Billy Boat R	(United States) 16 - Sam Schmidt R	(United States) 50 - Billy Roe R
9	(United States) 28 - Mark Dismore	(United States) 18 - Tyce Carlson R	(Brazil) 22 - Marco Greco
10	(United States) 54 - Dennis Vitolo	(Spain) 33 - Fermín Vélez	(United States) 97 - Greg Ray R
11	(Italy) 34 - Alessandro Zampedri	(Canada) 72 - Claude Bourbonnais R	(United States) 1 - Paul Durant
12	(United States) 90 - Lyn St. James	(United States) 9 - Johnny Unser	

Reinstated to the field by the officials after the end of time trials
Dropped out during the pace laps, and did not start the race

=== Alternates ===
- First alternate: #34 - No driver listed (Alessandro Zampedri's primary entry - bumped)

== Rain delay ==
=== Sunday May 25 ===
The race was originally scheduled for 11 a.m. EST on Sunday, May 25. Rain in the morning delayed the activities, but the skies appeared to lighten, and the cars were placed in the grid at 11:45 a.m. At 12 p.m., the skies opened up, and heavy rain began to fall. The cars were wheeled back to the garage area. At 1:30 p.m., track officials rescheduled the race for Monday.

Robby Gordon, driving for Felix Sabates' Team SABCO, had planned on driving the Indy 500/Coca-Cola 600 "Double Duty". At 1:45 p.m., Gordon left the grounds and flew to Charlotte. The Coca-Cola 600 also suffered a rain delay, but did eventually see the green flag fall. Gordon wrecked out on lap 186 and finished 41st.

=== Monday May 26 ===
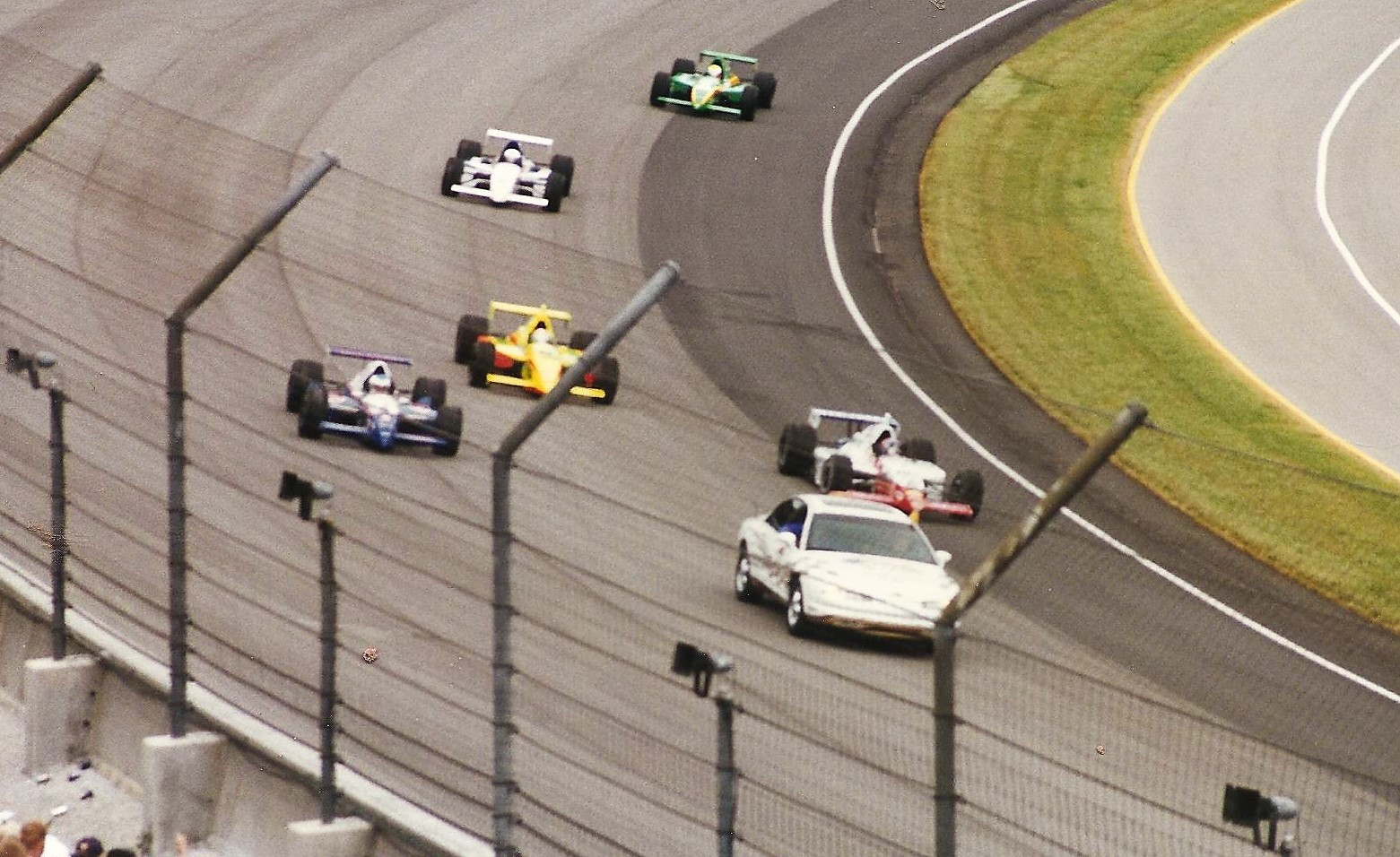
The pace cars leads the field through turn one on Monday during the parade lap.

On Memorial Day, Monday, May 26, the race was scheduled for 11 a.m. EST. Skies were partly cloudy in the morning, but there was no rain at the time. The pre-race ceremonies were held on time, but some subtle changes were made. The Purdue Band was unable to return for Monday, and therefore Florence Henderson's rendition of "The Star-Spangled Banner" was done a cappella. In addition, "Taps" was played by a local musician as a substitute. The most noteworthy change, however, was the absence of Jim Nabors. He had left the grounds Sunday night and was not present to sing the traditional "Back Home Again in Indiana". At his request, a recording from a previous year (1993) was played for the fans. Mari Hulman George followed, officially taking over the family tradition (from her mother Mary F. Hulman) of delivering the starting command. Mary F. Hulman had been inducted into the Auto Racing Hall of Fame earlier in the month, but was in declining health. Also absent was longtime Speedway public address announcer John Totten, who had fallen ill.

On the first parade lap, Dr. Jack Miller got sideways with cold tires and nearly spun in Turn 4. He continued and rejoined the field. On the final pace lap, all three cars of the fifth row, Stéphan Grégoire, Affonso Giaffone, and Kenny Bräck came together in Turn 4 and crashed out of the race. TV replays proved inconclusive to determine the cause of the accident, but a fan recording from the grandstands showed that Bräck had forced down Giaffone, whose left front tire touched Grégoire's car, turning him sideways and triggering the three-car incident. The start, therefore, was delayed by five extra pace laps. Afterwards, Robbie Groff stalled on the backstretch, and Sam Schmidt and Alessandro Zampedri ducked into the pits with mechanical trouble before the race was started. As such, only 30 of the 35 cars on the grid started the race.

Arie Luyendyk led the field to the green flag, but Tony Stewart slipstreamed past him after Turn 4 to lead the first lap. Team Menard would later register an official complaint over Luyendyk's start, after Stewart argued that Luyendyk had tried to crowd him towards the outside wall. During these first laps, Vincenzo Sospiri was overtaken by Robbie Buhl and a fast-starting Robby Gordon, who climbed eight spots in only two laps. Jim Guthrie also passed Sospiri and briefly pressured Gordon, but at the end of the sixth lap, he pulled into the pits with a sizeable water leak. Also, Eddie Cheever fell down the order after pitting because of a stuck gearbox.

On Lap 10, Claude Bourbonnais, running in 26th place, blew his engine, the three Blueprint Racing drivers having fallen by the wayside with mechanical issues after the team worked on their engines for the whole week. Moments after the caution came out, a light drizzle started falling around the track. During the caution, Guthrie's crew frantically tried to fix the leak, but he lost seven laps. On lap 15, the rain started to fall harder, and the race was red-flagged. With rain continuing to fall, the cars returned to the garage area at 12:30 p.m., and fans began to leave the grounds. The race had to go at least 101 laps to be considered official; with only fifteen laps completed, the race would have to be resumed.

After negotiations between IMS, series officials, and television executives, the decision was made at 2:15 p.m. to resume the race on Lap 16 the following day, Tuesday, May 27, at 11 a.m. The arrangement was similar to the one that occurred during the 1973 Indianapolis 500, and differed from a similar situation during the 1986 race. Many expected the conclusion of the race to be postponed until Saturday, May 31, but the officials agreed that, due to the upcoming race at Texas and the good forecast for Tuesday, it was in the best interest to finish the race as soon as possible.

=== Tuesday May 27 ===
With skies finally clearing, the race was finally able to get underway. Mari Hulman George delivered the "re-start" command at 11 a.m., and the race resumed at lap 16. Of the 35 qualifiers, 29 cars lined up single-file for the restart. The grandstands were only partially full, and it marked the first time since 1973 that the race was held mid-week. ABC-TV made a special arrangement to cover the race live as planned.

== Race running ==
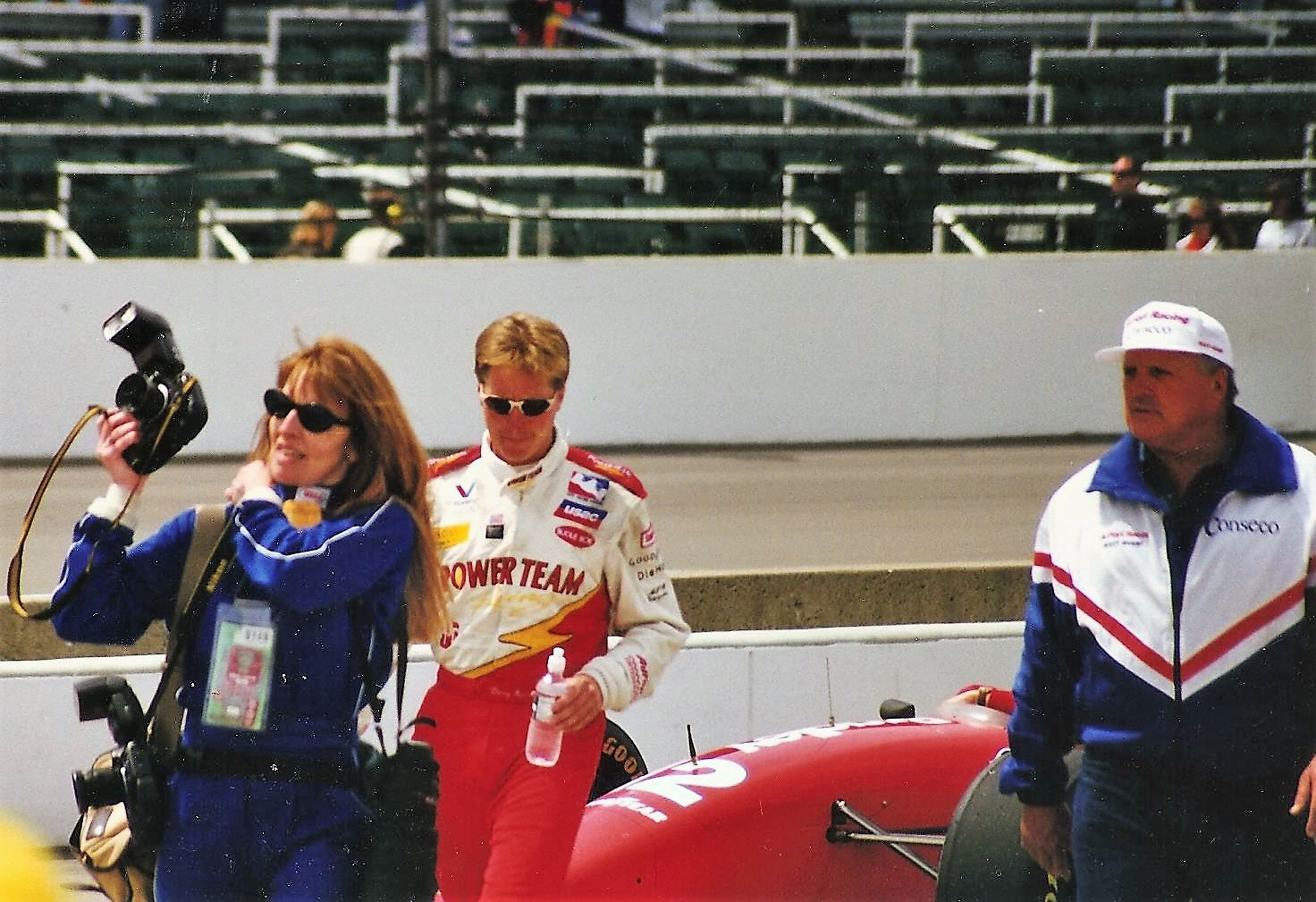
Davey Hamilton (left) and car owner A. J. Foyt (right) walk through the pit area on Tuesday after the race.

=== Re-start ===
The race picked up single-file from the pits at lap 16. The first two laps were run under caution as warm-up laps, however, they counted towards the race total. On lap 18, the green flag came out with Tony Stewart resuming the lead against a very bunched-up field. Robby Gordon was practically alongside Robbie Buhl when the green flag dropped, stripped him of the third place and rapidly closed up on Arie Luyendyk on the backstretch, but he suddenly veered to the warm-up lane in Turn 3, as his engine had caught fire. Gordon jumped out of the car, with his driver's suit burning from leaked methanol in the cockpit, and began rolling vigorously in the grass to put the fire out.

The caution came out, and the car was returned to the pits, with Gordon still willing to drive, but he had to retire from the race with first and second-degree burns on his wrists and right thigh, for which he would miss an entire month of Winston Cup competition. This would eventually lead to Gordon being released at the end of the year, after falling out of grace with Felix Sabates, who later said that his team would not be back to the Indy 500, being displeased with the attitude of the paddock and the style of Indy car racing.

As the field lined up for the restart on Lap 23, four cars tangled in Turn 4. Steve Kinser, up to tenth place, misjudged the procedure and tagged Eliseo Salazar from behind. In the ensuing avoiding measures, Mark Dismore slowed down in 13th place, only to be rear-ended by Roberto Guerrero, retiring on the spot. Salazar and Guerrero would lose laps with extensive repairs, but Kinser only had to replace his front wing. The first significant green flag racing of the week finally began at Lap 28, with Stewart leading Luyendyk and Buhl. Jeff Ward and Buddy Lazier were fourth and fifth in front of Vincenzo Sospiri and Scott Goodyear, having gained two and four positions respectively on the previous restart.

=== First half ===
Arie Luyendyk tried to pass Tony Stewart on the inside, but couldn't complete the move. The lost momentum allowed Robbie Buhl to pass him in Turn 3, and even Buddy Lazier, after passing Jeff Ward, had a chance to attack the pole-sitter. The top 4 drivers soon pulled away from their competitors, with Stewart maintaining a two-second lead and Luyendyk repassing Buhl on Lap 44. The leaders made their first pit stop around Lap 50, when Team Menard discovered they had no telemetry read from Stewart's car. On Lap 59, Jim Guthrie brought out the yellow, as his engine finally gave up. Vincenzo Sospiri had pitted earlier than anyone else, but had to make an unscheduled pit stop during the caution because of a malfunctioning fuel alarm. He rejoined in tenth place as the last car in the lead lap, behind Scott Goodyear, Buzz Calkins, a recovering Eddie Cheever and Davey Hamilton.

On the Lap 62 restart, Luyendyk jumped to the front, putting a four-second lead over Stewart in thirteen laps. Buhl and Lazier ran nose-to-tail within ten seconds of Luyendyk, while the other lead lap drivers had fallen at least twenty seconds behind. Luyendyk made his second pit stop on Lap 79, and a brief issue with the air jack put him behind Stewart, but he reclaimed the lead going around the outside in Turn 1. Buhl, hampered by a failed rear wing change, and Ward also lost places to Lazier and Goodyear, although Lazier could not join the two leaders after being held up by the lapped car of Steve Kinser. At the longest green flag run of the day at 32 laps, Davey Hamilton was lapped, Eddie Cheever had to retire with a broken timing chain, and Buzz Calkins lost two laps after running out of fuel entering the pits.

On Lap 93, a loose brake caliper forced Eliseo Salazar, who was already 23 laps down, to stop the car in Turn 2, bringing out the yellow flag. Robbie Buhl, Vincenzo Sospiri and Jeff Ward pitted for fuel and tires, but Sospiri was shown the black flag for passing Ward under caution. Sospiri served his penalty on Lap 100, but he stopped again four laps later with an electronic coil failure, and spent much of the second half of the race in the pits trying to figure out the issue. By the halfway point, thirteen cars had dropped out, and six stayed on the lead lap, with Billy Boat, Marco Greco, Paul Durant and Davey Hamilton in the top 10.

=== Second half ===
The race was restarted at the halfway mark, just one lap before the race became official. Buddy Lazier briefly pressured Tony Stewart, but the latter picked up the pace and caught Arie Luyendyk within five laps. Luyendyk made his pit stop on Lap 111, one lap before Stewart and Scott Goodyear, but he had issues again, this time on the left front tyre, and Stewart emerged in front of him after his stop. Buddy Lazier, Robbie Buhl and Jeff Ward, meanwhile, elected to stretch their stints, and their choice initially paid off when the fifth caution of the day came out on Lap 114.

From 33rd on the grid, Paul Durant had climbed up to eighth, and was close to teammate Billy Boat, both one lap down from the leaders. In Turn 3, Boat passed Billy Roe, who was two laps down in 14th place, and Durant tried to do the same, but Roe closed the gap, unaware of Durant's presence, and both collided. Roe emerged unscathed from the heavy impact on the outside wall, but Durant had to be transferred to Methodist Hospital with a fractured pelvis and a concussion. Durant became the third injured driver in Foyt's #1 car during the month of May, after Scott Sharp and Johnny O'Connell. Durant's car kept accelerating when he got knocked out, just like Sharp's two weeks before.

Ward and Lazier made their pit stop under caution, with Ward rejoining between Stewart and Luyendyk, but Lazier ran out of fuel entering the pits and lost half a minute. Surprisingly, Buhl elected not to pit despite being on the same pit sequence as the leaders and, after the '1 to go' signal prevented a late change of mind, he restarted as the race leader. Luyendyk charged again, passing Ward on the restart and Stewart on Lap 128, and inherited the race lead when Buhl pitted four laps later. Trying to navigate through traffic while losing power, Lazier had a heated argument with Marco Greco when the Brazilian held him up, waving angrily at him as he made it past.

The yellow flag was waved again on Lap 138, when Jack Miller, running four laps down, crashed out of 17th place after losing control of his car in Turn 3. Mike Groff, the IRL points leader, spun trying to avoid him, having already lost six laps. Luyendyk, Stewart and Goodyear pitted under caution, leaving Ward and Lazier in front. On the Lap 143 restart, Stewart struck back by passing Luyendyk and Lazier on one lap. Lazier kept dropping back and was swiftly passed by Luyendyk and Goodyear. Despite his great restart, Stewart suffered from a push condition and lost ground to Ward, falling seven seconds back on just five laps. Luyendyk eventually took advantage and passed him on Lap 159, with Goodyear closely behind. Six laps later, Tyce Carlson spun in Turn 2 just after being passed by Stewart. The caution ended Buhl's chances, as he had pitted just seconds before, losing a lap to the leaders.

Both Ward and Lazier pitted before anyone else on Lap 166 to gain track position, gambling on a caution-less finish. Luyendyk, Stewart and Goodyear pitted three laps later, but Stewart stalled his car and placed behind Goodyear on the Lap 170 restart. Both were able to pass Luyendyk, who also developed understeer in his car, and Lazier became vulnerable against all three of them on Lap 175. Twenty laps from the end, Stewart passed Goodyear but, five laps later, he went high on the exit of Turn 4 to avoid the slowing car of Buzz Calkins, which allowed Goodyear to regain the position. Luyendyk tried to follow his teammate, but Stewart closed the door on him in the backstretch, forcing Luyendyk to put two wheels on the grass. Goodyear was running thirteen seconds behind Ward, but had the potential race lead, as Ward needed one final splash-and-go fuel stop before the finish.

=== Controversial finish ===
With eleven laps to go, Steve Kinser crashed out of ninth place when his left rear tire touched with the front right tire of Buzz Calkins, whom he was lapping on the outside of Turn 4. Lyn St. James, coming from behind after being passed by Kinser, ran high trying to avoid him and clipped the wall, damaging her suspension. The ensuing caution flag saw leader Jeff Ward head to the pits for a splash of fuel, as well as Tony Stewart, who was two gallons short per his team. With eight laps left, Scott Goodyear and his teammate Arie Luyendyk led the order, followed by Buddy Lazier, while Ward and Stewart had a group of six lapped cars in front. They were the only five drivers on the lead lap.

The green flag came back out on Lap 194, and Luyendyk passed Goodyear on Turn 3 to take the lead. Trying to make it to the end in fifth place, Lazier lost his right-side rear-view mirror two laps later. The mirror got stranded in Turn 2, causing another caution for debris, and the green came back out at the conclusion of Lap 197, with three laps to go. As Luyendyk and Goodyear crossed the start/finish line to complete lap 198, Tony Stewart brushed the wall in turn 4, bending the right-front suspension. Although Stewart had continued, and the car was not seriously damaged, USAC immediately brought out the yellow. The pace car did not enter the track to pick up the leader, as was the normal procedure, and both teams and drivers understood the race would finish under caution, as did IMS Radio Network announcer Bob Jenkins.

As the cars came out of Turn 4, without any warning, USAC officials suddenly displayed the white and green flags simultaneously at the starter's stand. The race was back underway for the final lap. The entire field hesitated as the yellow caution lights around the track remained illuminated, unsure if the green flag was an error and if the conditions were safe to race. Luyendyk obliged the flagstand, dropped a gear, and accelerated down the front straight, getting a jump on Goodyear and the rest of the field in the process. The yellow lights continued flashing around the track, something Luyendyk noticed on his radio while entering the backstretch, and did not go off until the leaders were nearly at Turn 3. The botched procedure prevented any significant challenge by Goodyear, and Arie Luyendyk pulled away just enough in the final lap to take the victory. It was Luyendyk's second Indy 500 win, becoming the 16th driver to win from the pole position. Luyendyk was emotional in victory lane as he stated:

"I saw the green and white flag wave and I thought 'Hell, they better know what they're doing' and I will keep doing what I've been doing. This is a lot better than my first in 1990."

His teammate Scott Goodyear was satisfied but still disappointed at the outcome:

"That's the key lap of the whole race, obviously, because you want to get a draft, get the guy going and lead coming out the backstretch. I don't think Arie even expected it. Overall, a 1-2 finish for Treadway is a bonus but...disappointed that I didn't win."

After brushing the wall late, Tony Stewart limped around on the final lap with a bent suspension arm. After leading the most laps, he held on to finish in 5th place, the last car on the lead lap. It was his best Indy finish and only career top-five at the Indy 500.

== Box score ==
Pos	No.	Driver	Team	Chassis	Engine	Tire	Laps	Status	Grid	Pts.
1	5	(Netherlands) Arie Luyendyk W	Treadway Racing	G-Force	Oldsmobile	F	200	145.827 mph	1	37
2	6	(Canada) Scott Goodyear	Treadway Racing	G-Force	Oldsmobile	F	200	+0.570	5	33
3	52	(United States) Jeff Ward R	Team Cheever	G-Force	Oldsmobile	G	200	+4.081	7	32
4	91	(United States) Buddy Lazier W	Hemelgarn Racing	Dallara	Oldsmobile	F	200	+10.330	10	31
5	2	(United States) Tony Stewart	Team Menard	G-Force	Oldsmobile	F	200	+28.613	2	31
6	14	(United States) Davey Hamilton	A. J. Foyt Enterprises	G-Force	Oldsmobile	G	199	-1 lap	8	29
7	11	(United States) Billy Boat R	A. J. Foyt Enterprises	Dallara	Oldsmobile	G	199	-1 lap	22	28
8	3	(United States) Robbie Buhl	Team Menard	G-Force	Oldsmobile	F	199	-1 lap	4	27
9	30	(United States) Robbie Groff R	McCormack Motorsports	G-Force	Oldsmobile	G	197	-3 laps	21	26
10	33	(Spain) Fermín Vélez	Team Scandia	Dallara	Oldsmobile	G	195	-5 laps	29	25
11	12	(United States) Buzz Calkins	Bradley Motorsports	G-Force	Oldsmobile	G	188	Half shaft	16	24
12	10	(United States) Mike Groff	Byrd-Cunningham Racing	G-Force	Infiniti	F	188	-12 laps	18	23
13	90	(United States) Lyn St. James	Hemelgarn Racing	Dallara	Infiniti	F	186	Accident	34	22
14	44	(United States) Steve Kinser R	Sinden Racing Services	Dallara	Oldsmobile	G	185	Accident	20	21
15	54	(United States) Dennis Vitolo	Beck Motorsports	Dallara	Infiniti	F	173	-27 laps	28	20
16	22	(Brazil) Marco Greco	Team Scandia	Dallara	Oldsmobile	G	166	Gearbox	27	19
17	8	(Italy) Vincenzo Sospiri R	Team Scandia	Dallara	Oldsmobile	G	163	-37 laps	3	18
18	9	(United States) Johnny Unser	Hemelgarn Racing	Dallara	Infiniti	F	158	Oil pressure	35	17
19	18	(United States) Tyce Carlson R	PDM Racing	Dallara	Oldsmobile	G	156	Accident	26	16
20	40	(United States) Jack Miller R	Arizona Motorsports	Dallara	Infiniti	F	131	Accident	17	15
21	1	(United States) Paul Durant	A. J. Foyt Enterprises	G-Force	Oldsmobile	G	111	Accident	33	14
22	50	(United States) Billy Roe R	EuroInternational	Dallara	Oldsmobile	F	110	Accident	24	13
23	51	(United States) Eddie Cheever	Team Cheever	G-Force	Oldsmobile	G	84	Timing chain	11	12
24	7	(Chile) Eliseo Salazar	Team Scandia	Dallara	Oldsmobile	G	70	Accident	9	11
25	97	(United States) Greg Ray R	Knapp Motorsports	Dallara	Oldsmobile	F	48	Water pump	30	10
26	27	(United States) Jim Guthrie	Blueprint Racing	Dallara	Oldsmobile	F	43	Engine	6	9
27	21	(Colombia) Roberto Guerrero	Pagan Racing	Dallara	Infiniti	G	25	Steering	19	8
28	28	(United States) Mark Dismore	Kelley Racing - PDM	Dallara	Oldsmobile	G	24	Accident	25	7
29	42	(United States) Robby Gordon	Team SABCO	G-Force	Oldsmobile	G	19	Fire	12	6
30	72	(Canada) Claude Bourbonnais R	Blueprint Racing	Dallara	Oldsmobile	F	9	Engine	32	5
31	77	(France) Stéphan Grégoire	Chastain Motorsports	G-Force	Oldsmobile	G	0	Accident	13	4
32	17	(Brazil) Affonso Giaffone R	Chitwood Motorsports	Dallara	Oldsmobile	G	0	Accident	14	3
33	4	(Sweden) Kenny Bräck R	Galles Racing	G-Force	Oldsmobile	G	0	Accident	15	2
34	16	(United States) Sam Schmidt R	Blueprint Racing	Dallara	Oldsmobile	F	0	Engine	23	1
35	34	(Italy) Alessandro Zampedri	Team Scandia	Dallara	Oldsmobile	G	0	Oil leak	31	1

W Former Indianapolis 500 winner

R Indianapolis 500 Rookie

=== Race statistics ===
Lap Leaders
Laps	Leader
1–50	Tony Stewart
51	Billy Boat
52–62	Tony Stewart
63–78	Arie Luyendyk
79	Tony Stewart
80–82	Buddy Lazier
83–109	Arie Luyendyk
110–111	Tony Stewart
112–115	Buddy Lazier
116–131	Robbie Buhl
132–140	Arie Luyendyk
141	Scott Goodyear
142–166	Jeff Ward
167–168	Arie Luyendyk
169–192	Jeff Ward
193	Scott Goodyear
194–200	Arie Luyendyk

Total laps led
Driver	Laps
Tony Stewart	64
Arie Luyendyk	61
Jeff Ward	49
Robbie Buhl	16
Buddy Lazier	7
Scott Goodyear	2
Billy Boat	1

Cautions: 12 for 56 laps
Laps	Reason
Monday May 26
Pace lap	Giafonne, Bräck, Grégoire crash in turn 4
10–15	Claude Bourbonnais blown engine; Rain (red flag)
Tuesday May 27
16–18	Warm-up laps for race restart
20–28	Robby Gordon fire in turn 3
59–62	Jim Guthrie blown engine
94–99	Eliseo Salazar stalled in turn 2
114–123	Billy Roe, Paul Durant crash in turn 3
138–142	Jack Miller crash in turn 3
165–169	Tyce Carlson spin in turn 2
189–193	Steve Kinser, Lyn St. James crash in turn 4
196–197	Debris
199	Tony Stewart brushed wall in turn 4

Tire participation chart
Supplier	No. of starters
Goodyear	20
Firestone	15*
* - Denotes race winner

== Standings after the race ==
Drivers' Championship standings

Pos	Driver	Points
1	(United States) Mike Groff	148
2	(United States) Davey Hamilton	143
3	(United States) Buzz Calkins	137
4	(United States) Tony Stewart	133
5	(Brazil) Marco Greco	131

- Note: Only the top five positions are included for the standings.

== Aftermath ==
After the 25/8 qualifying controversy, rain delays, and bungling of the final lap by the officials, as well as the scrapping of the split-calendar IRL schedule, the 1997 Indy 500 represented a relative low-point for the then-fledgling IRL. The high attrition exposed growing pains for the new chassis and engine formula. The battle of the engine suppliers was completely one-sided, as Oldsmobile dominated, taking the top 11 finishing positions. Infiniti saw no cars in contention during most of the race.

The race also marked the end of the IRL's lucrative initial exclusive contract with ABC Sports, which was not renewed in its entirety. While the Indy 500 itself would remain on ABC, as well as a handful of other races, the IRL would have to complete their TV scheduling with other networks for two and a half years.

The first move to make amends was to drop the 25/8 rule permanently. Two weeks later, at Texas Motor Speedway, during the inaugural True Value 500, the increasing dissatisfaction with USAC's officiating hit the boiling point. A malfunction in the electronic scoring system scored Billy Boat as the winner of the race. Meanwhile, Indy 500 winner Arie Luyendyk stormed in victory lane, claiming he was robbed of the victory, which led to a physical altercation between him and Boat's car owner A. J. Foyt. The following day, the error was discovered, and it was another black mark on USAC's record. Two weeks later, USAC was officially relieved of the duty of sanctioning the IRL, and was replaced by an in-house effort.

On the competition side, Luyendyk became the only driver to win an Indy 500 both before and after the open wheel "split". Luyendyk had previously won the 1990 Indianapolis 500, at a time when most of the field consisted of CART series regulars. Luyendyk also had the distinction of winning the race with both a turbocharged (1990) and a normally aspirated (1997) engine, as well as winning a race with Goodyear and Firestone tires.

In just his second Indy car race, and as a one-off driver, Jeff Ward finished in a remarkable third place, winning Rookie of the Year honours. After battling with Luyendyk for most of the race, Tony Stewart could only finish the race in fifth place, behind Buddy Lazier. Indy car debutant Billy Boat and rookie Robbie Groff also finished in the top 10, with Robbie Buhl in between. Mike Groff finished as the highest Infiniti placed driver in twelfth place despite losing twelve laps and retained the IRL points lead, with a five-point advantage over Davey Hamilton, who finished sixth.

== Broadcasting ==
=== Radio ===
The race was carried live on the IMS Radio Network. Bob Jenkins served as chief announcer for the eighth year. Johnny Rutherford served as "driver expert", and at the start of the race, also drove the pace car. The race was heard on roughly 500 affiliates.

The crew for the 1997 race remained the same from 1996. The broadcast featured rain delay coverage on Sunday, live coverage of the start on Monday, and live coverage of the conclusion on Tuesday. All members of the crew participated on all three days. After serving as a guest booth analyst the previous two years, Chris Economaki spent all three days in the pits as a roving reporter. Economaki conducted interviews and offered observations at various points during the race. In the pit area, Mark Jaynes covered the north pits, Mike King began the race in the center pits, and Vince Welch began the race in the south pits. In the second half of the race, King and Welch shared duties in the south and center pits, focusing on the race leaders.

Indianapolis Motor Speedway Radio Network
Booth Announcers	Turn Reporters	Pit/garage reporters
Chief Announcer: Bob Jenkins; Driver expert: Johnny Rutherford; Statistician: Howdy Bell; Historian: Donald Davidson	Turn 1: Jerry Baker; Turn 2: Ken Double; Turn 3: Gary Lee; Turn 4: Bob Lamey	Chuck Marlowe (garages/hospital); Chris Economaki (interviews/roving reporter)
Chief Announcer: Bob Jenkins; Driver expert: Johnny Rutherford; Statistician: Howdy Bell; Historian: Donald Davidson	Turn 1: Jerry Baker; Turn 2: Ken Double; Turn 3: Gary Lee; Turn 4: Bob Lamey	Mark Jaynes (north pits); Mike King (center pits); Vince Welch (south pits)

=== Television ===
The race was carried live, flag-to-flag coverage in the United States on ABC Sports. Paul Page served as host and play-by-play announcer. Tom Sneva joined the crew and served as booth analyst. Bobby Unser (turn 2) and Danny Sullivan (turn 4) served as turn reporters, and this would be the final 500 on ABC for both Unser and Sullivan.

The race was scheduled for Sunday, May 25, but rain postponed the start. ABC stayed on as scheduled on Sunday, and the broadcast was filled with highlights, interviews, and talk. On Monday, May 26, ABC returned to broadcast the race live, preempting regularly scheduled programming. The broadcast came on-air live at 11 EDT, and featured a one-hour pre-race, mirroring the traditional Sunday broadcast format. The race started, but was halted again on lap 15 due to rain. When it was announced that the race would be postponed again, ABC signed off and returned to its regularly scheduled lineup.

On Tuesday, May 27, ABC returned once again to air the remainder of the race live. Unlike a similar situation in 1986, officials decided to resume the race on Tuesday, rather than wait until Saturday. ABC again preempted their afternoon lineup and carried the entire conclusion.

ABC Television
Booth Announcers	Pit/garage reporters
Host/Announcer: Paul Page; Color: Tom Sneva; Color/Turn 2: Bobby Unser; Color/Turn 4: Danny Sullivan	Jack Arute; Gary Gerould; Dr. Jerry Punch

Practice and time trials were carried over three networks: ABC, ESPN, and ESPN2.

- Live Daily Reports (ESPN2): Paul Page, Dave Despain, Jon Beekuis, Dr. Jerry Punch, Gary Gerould, Mike King
- Time trials (ABC): Paul Page, Tom Sneva, Jack Arute, Gary Gerould
- Time trials (ESPN): Dave Despain, Tom Sneva, Jack Arute, Dr. Jerry Punch, Gary Gerould
- Time trials (ESPN2): Paul Page, Tom Sneva, Dr. Jerry Punch, Jon Beekuis, Mike King
- Carb Day (ESPN): Dave Despain, Jon Beekuis, Dr. Jerry Punch, Mike King
- RPM2Day at Indy (ESPN2): Kenny Mayne, Marlo Klain

== Gallery ==
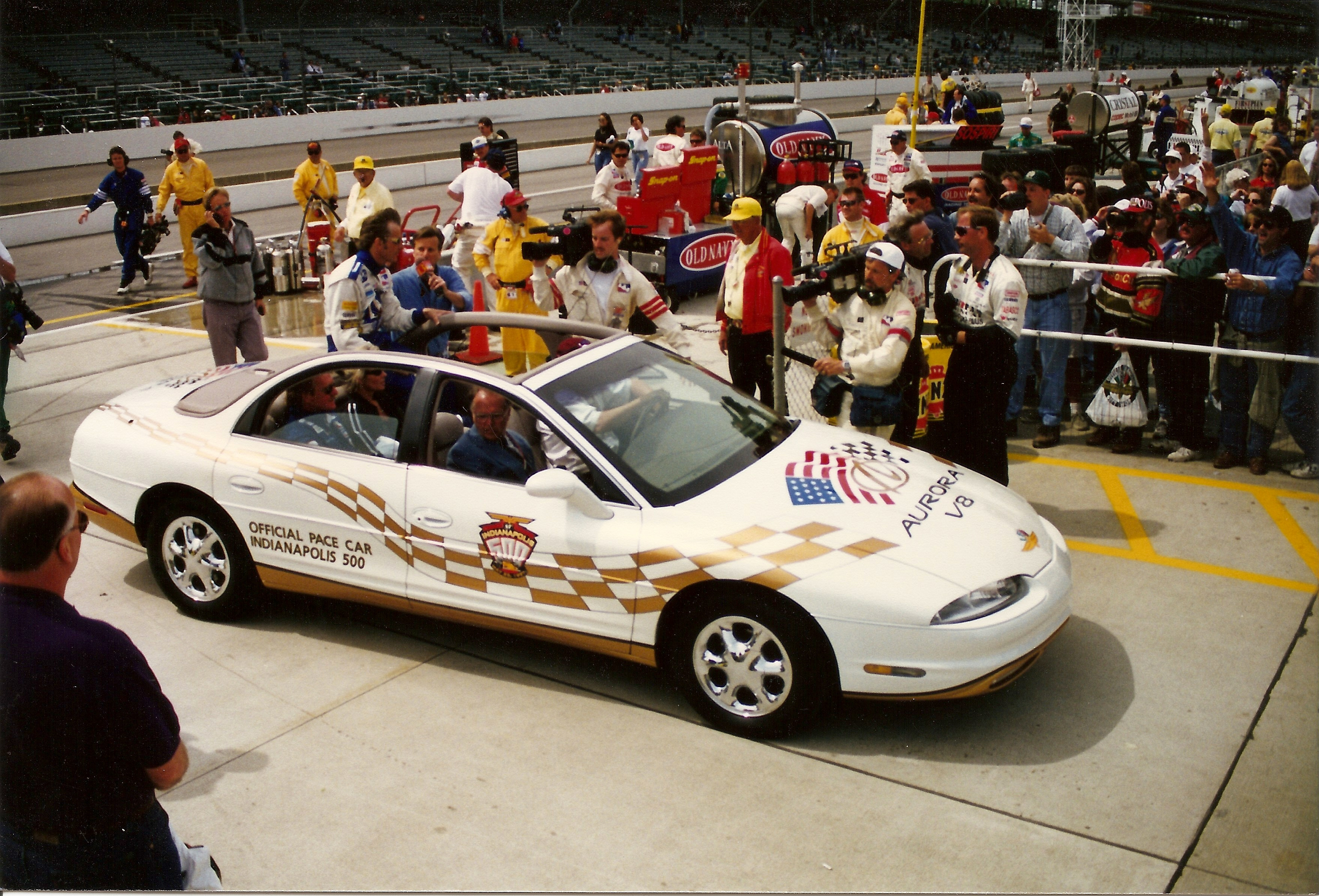
1997 Oldsmobile Aurora pace car

== Notes ==
=== Works cited ===
- 1997 Indianapolis 500 Daily Trackside Report for the Media
- Indianapolis 500 History: Race & All-Time Stats - Official Site
- 1997 Indianapolis 500 Radio Broadcast, Indianapolis Motor Speedway Radio Network

Previous race: 1997 Phoenix 200	Indy Racing League; 1996-1997 season	Next race: 1997 True Value 500
Previous race: 1996 Indianapolis 500	Indianapolis 500	Next race: 1998 Indianapolis 500
