= Conquer Paralysis Now =

Conquer Paralysis Now, formerly the Sam Schmidt Paralysis Foundation (SSPF), is a charitable organization founded in 2000 and headquartered in Pennington, New Jersey. The charity aims to find a cure for paralysis.

== History ==
In January 2000, during a practice run at Walt Disney World Speedway, Sam Schmidt's car collided with the racetrack wall at 160 mph and he sustained a C-3/4/5 spinal cord injury. Following the accident, Sam Schmidt took the passion and commitment that made him one of America's top race car drivers and focused it on creating a broader awareness of spinal cord injuries and the research necessary to find treatment and cures.

The Sam Schmidt Paralysis Foundation (SSPF) was formed later that same year to raise the necessary dollars to increase awareness of spinal cord injury/paralysis and the impact it has on the patient and family, for medical research to develop cures and effective therapeutic treatments and, most importantly, to provide newly injured patients and their families with the psychological support and resources to help them lead productive lives and to keep the family intact.

== Research ==
To cure paralysis and loss of function that spinal cord injuries cause, doctors will need a carefully orchestrated series of interventions. Treatments will begin in the emergency room and continue for months. Ever new forms of rehabilitation will be part of the therapeutic package. To speed the day when this regimen is available, SSPF supports research on a variety of fronts. Individual research grants encourage a multi-disciplinary approach to solving the complex medical problems that result from spinal cord injuries, in both the acute and chronic stages.

Perceptions about the human spinal cord have undergone a revolution in recent years. What was once considered hopeless is now showing signs of promise. SSPF funded scientists are on the cutting edge of spinal cord research, and advances are being made every day.

== Advocacy ==
Working with other national organizations and visiting congressional leaders in Washington, SSPF works to influence the legislative agenda to meet the needs of people with disabilities. By keeping SSPF constituents informed on legislation, they become self-empowered and speak out to local and state elected officials as well as lawmakers in Washington. This helps educate key influencers about the vast returns that come from national commitment to research, rehabilitation, disability rights and quality of life issues.

== Paralysis and Spinal Cord Injury facts and figures ==
Paralysis is caused by injury, stroke and disease. According to recent research, of the almost 6 million people living with paralysis in the United States alone, 1.3 million are spinal cord injured. This is about five times the number of people previously assumed, with many millions more throughout the world. Approximately 18,000 new spinal cord injuries occur in the United States every year.

According to information collected by the U.S. Census Bureau, having a disability of any kind greatly increases a person's odds of living in poverty. Over 50% of people with paralysis and over 62% of people with spinal cord injury live in poverty. Paralysis and spinal cord injuries cost the U.S. health care system billions of dollars each year. Spinal cord injury costs total roughly $40.5 billion annually. There are 50,000 wounded or injured soldiers from the wars in Iraq and Afghanistan and many have suffered spinal cord injuries. It is anticipated that these numbers will rise.
