= 1993 Atlantic Championship =

1993 Toyota Atlantic Championship season
- Player's Toyota Atlantic Championship

Season
- Races: 15
- Start date: April 3rd
- End date: October 3rd

Awards
- Drivers' champion: (Canada) David Empringham

The 1993 Toyota Atlantic Championship season was contested over 15 rounds. The Player's Toyota Atlantic Championship Drivers' Champion was David Empringham driving for Canaska Racing.

== Races ==
Rnd	Race Name	Circuit	City/Location	Date	Pole position	Winning driver
1	(United States) 1993 Phoenix	Phoenix International Raceway	Phoenix, Arizona	April 3	(United States) Jeff Barker	(United States) Stuart Crow
2	(United States) 1993 Long Beach	Streets of Long Beach	Long Beach, California	April 17	(Canada) Jacques Villeneuve	(Canada) Claude Bourbonnais
3	(United States) 1993 Road Atlanta	Road Atlanta	Braselton, Georgia	May 9	(Canada) Jacques Villeneuve	(Canada) Jacques Villeneuve
4	(United States) 1993 Milwaukee	Milwaukee Mile	West Allis, Wisconsin	June 5	(United States) Greg Ray	(Canada) Claude Bourbonnais
5	(Canada) 1993 Montréal	Circuit Gilles Villeneuve	Montreal, Quebec	June 12	(Canada) Claude Bourbonnais	(Canada) Jacques Villeneuve
6	(Canada) 1993 Mosport	Mosport International Raceway	Bowmanville, Ontario	June 20	(Canada) Claude Bourbonnais	(Canada) Claude Bourbonnais
7	(Canada) 1993 Halifax	Citadel Hill (Fort George)	Halifax Peninsula, Nova Scotia	July 11	(Canada) David Empringham	(Canada) Trevor Seibert
8	(Canada) 1993 Toronto	Exhibition Place	Toronto, Ontario	July 17	(Canada) Claude Bourbonnais	(Canada) Claude Bourbonnais
9	(United States) 1993 Loudon	New Hampshire Motor Speedway	Loudon, New Hampshire	August 8	(Canada) Jacques Villeneuve	(Canada) Claude Bourbonnais
10	(Canada) 1993 Trois-Rivières	Circuit Trois-Rivières	Trois-Rivières, Quebec	August 15	(Canada) Jacques Villeneuve	(Canada) David Empringham
11	(Canada) 1993 Vancouver	Streets of Vancouver	Vancouver, British Columbia	August 28	(Canada) Trevor Seibert	(Canada) Claude Bourbonnais
12	(United States) 1993 Mid-Ohio	Mid-Ohio Sports Car Course	Lexington, Ohio	September 11	(Canada) Jacques Villeneuve	(Canada) Jacques Villeneuve
13	(United States) 1993 Nazareth	Nazareth Speedway	Nazareth, Pennsylvania	September 18	(Canada) Claude Bourbonnais	(Canada) Claude Bourbonnais
14	(United States) 1993 Laguna Seca 1	Mazda Raceway Laguna Seca	Monterey, California	October 2	(Canada) Jacques Villeneuve	(Canada) Jacques Villeneuve
15	(United States) 1993 Laguna Seca 2	Mazda Raceway Laguna Seca	Monterey, California	October 3	(Canada) Jacques Villeneuve	(Canada) Jacques Villeneuve

Oval/Speedway
Road Course/Street Circuit

== Final driver standings (Top 12) ==
Pos	Driver	Pts
1	(Canada) David Empringham	195
2	(Canada) Claude Bourbonnais	191
3	(Canada) Jacques Villeneuve	185
4	(United States) Jeff Barker	124
5	(United States) Colin Trueman	122
6	(Canada) Trevor Seibert	101
7	(United States) Peter Faucetta	100
8	(United States) Steve O'Hara	97
9	(United States) Bert Hart	95
10	(United States) Jamie Galles	81
11	(United States) Charlie Nearburg	75
12	(United States) Mark Dismore	61

== See also ==
- 1993 IndyCar season
- 1993 Indy Lights season
