= Sam Schmidt =

American racing driver (born 1964)

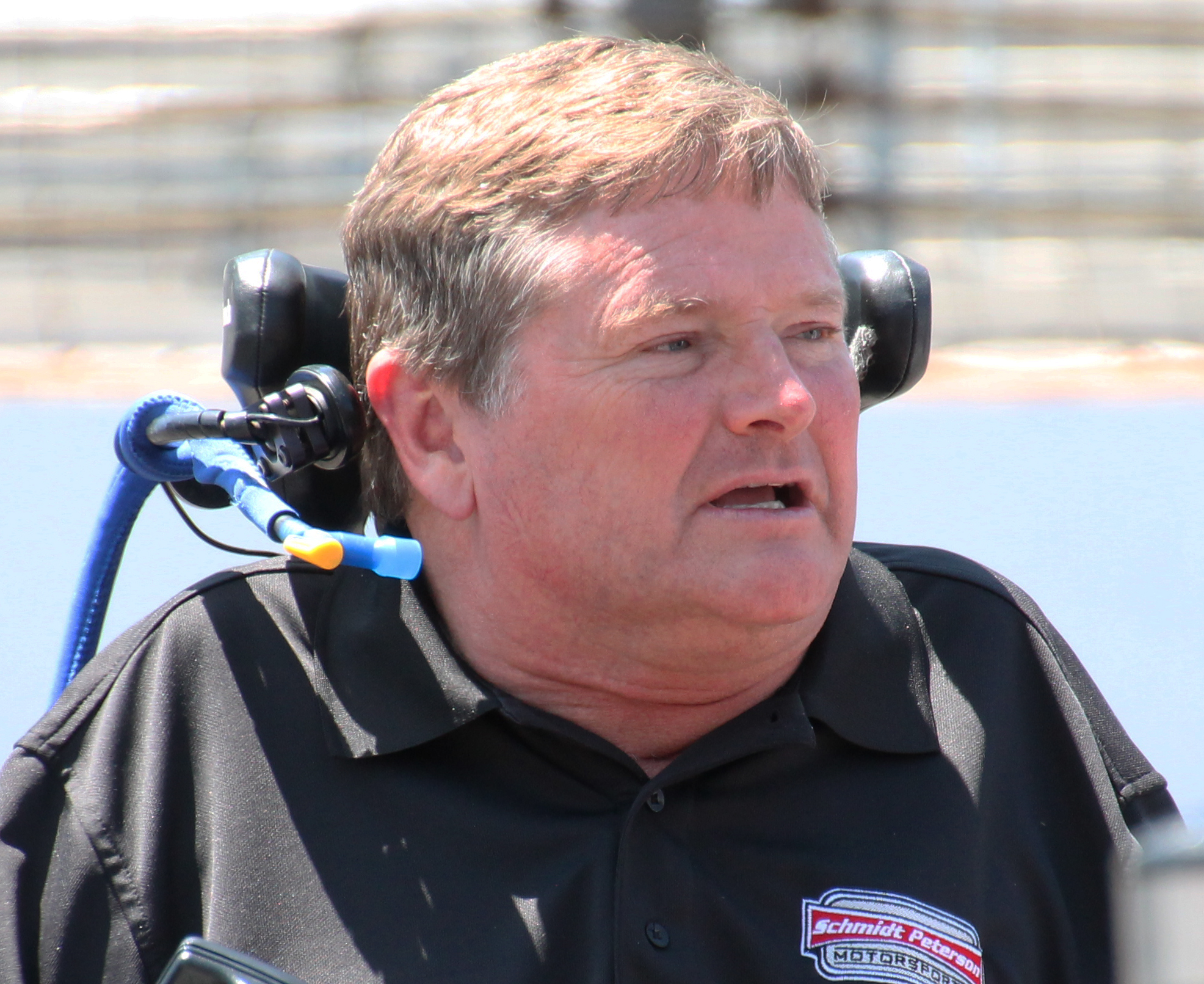
- Schmidt in 2015
- Born: August 15, 1964 (age 62) Lincoln, Nebraska, U.S.

IndyCar Series
- Years active: 1997–1999
- Teams: Blueprint Racing; LP Racing; Treadway Racing
- Starts: 26
- Wins: 1
- Poles: 1
- Best finish: 5th in 1999

Previous series
- 1995: USAR Hooters Pro Cup Series

Samuel Schmidt (born August 15, 1964) is a former Indy Racing League driver and NTT IndyCar Series and Indy Lights series team owner. Schmidt's brief IndyCar career included a win in 1999, but an accident before the 2000 season left him a quadriplegic. Schmidt was a co-owner of the Arrow McLaren IndyCar team. Schmidt also founded Conquer Paralysis Now, a charitable organization founded in 2000 with the aim of finding a cure for paralysis.

== Racing career ==
After graduating from Pepperdine University, Schmidt became a successful businessman, eventually purchasing his father's parts company in 1989 at the age of 25. He raced at a competitive amateur level, supported by his business income, but dreamed of someday driving in the Indianapolis 500. Schmidt first drove professionally in 1995 in the USAR Hooters Pro Cup Series at the age of 31, where he won Rookie of the Year honors.

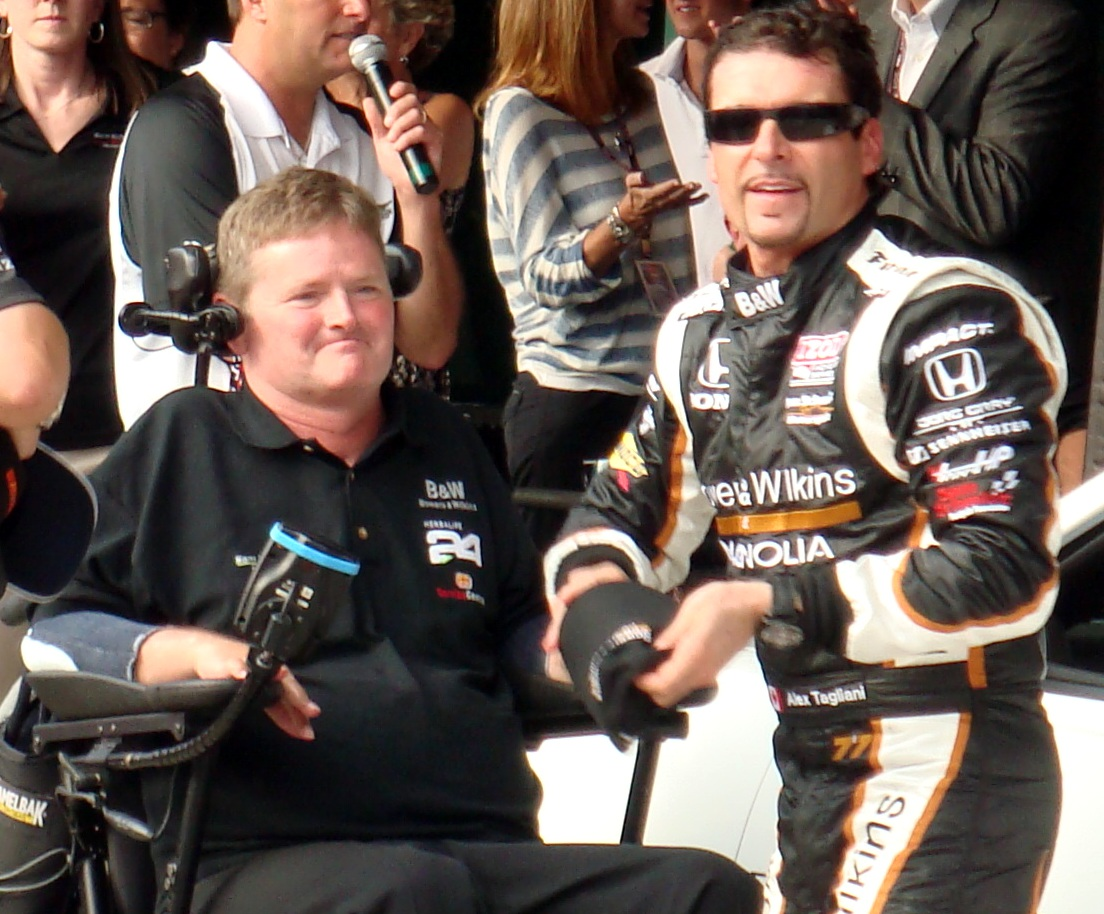
Sam Schmidt with 2011 Indianapolis 500 pole winner Alex Tagliani, who drove for Schmidt's team

In 1997, Schmidt made his first Indy Racing League start and became a rising star in the league. He raced three consecutive years at the Indianapolis 500, and earned his first race victory, from pole position, at Las Vegas in 1999. He finished fifth in series points that year. During that offseason, while testing in preparation for the 2000 season, Schmidt crashed at Walt Disney World Speedway on January 6, 2000. The accident rendered him a quadriplegic, and put him on a ventilator for six weeks.

After leaving the hospital, Schmidt, no longer able to drive a racecar, realized he needed to find a new passion and follow it. Inspired by meeting tetraplegic Formula One team owner Sir Frank Williams, he founded Sam Schmidt Motorsports, which became the most successful team in the history of the Indy Lights series, winning the 2004 series championship with Thiago Medeiros, the 2006 title with Jay Howard, and the 2007 title with Alex Lloyd. Schmidt shuttered the Indy Lights program after the 2016 season having claimed seven series championships. Sam Schmidt Motorsports was a full-time IndyCar series team in 2001 and 2002.

After acquiring the FAZZT Race Team IndyCar team in 2011, Sam Schmidt Motorsports returned full-time to the IZOD IndyCar Series, and on May 21, 2011, driver Alex Tagliani won the pole position for the Indianapolis 500, the first pole for the team. The team ultimately won the Indianapolis 500 Pole Position twice, including with driver James Hinchcliffe in 2016, secured seven victories, and finished third in the 2013 and 2021 point standings. At the end of 2024, Sam sold the team to McLaren Racing to spend more time with his family and focus on his foundation.

== Charitable Efforts ==
Shortly after his accident, Schmidt and a few close friends founded the Sam Schmidt Foundation, which was rebranded Conquer Paralysis Now Conquer Paralysis Now, in 2015. The Foundation has funded research on a global level, provided grants to organizations benefiting the disabled, and continues its nationally acclaimed Day at the Races program, which provides opportunities for individuals with disabilities.

Conquer Paralysis Now (CPN) has embarked on a major initiative to spark collaboration among researchers on an international level from various scientific fields to find cures and treatments for paralysis. In December 2018, the DRIVEN Neuro Recovery Center was opened in downtown Las Vegas as a program of CPN. The facility provides activity-based therapy, an open gym and many programs for anyone with a neurological disorder. In late 2024, CPN opened a flagship 114,000 sq ft DRIVEN center in Carmel, Indiana, with hopes of creating more facilities around the country.

== Awards ==
Schmidt has received the Gateway to a Cure Award, New Ability Award, Visionary Leadership Award from the Christopher and Dana Reeve Foundation, the Distinguished Alumni Award from Pepperdine University, the Humanitarian Award from the Las Vegas Walk of Stars Foundation and the 2013 Courage Award. Schmidt was also the commencement speaker at Pepperdine University's graduation in 2021, where he received an Honorary Doctorate. In 2017, he was inducted into the Nevada Sports Hall of Fame.

== Career results ==
=== Indy Racing League ===
(key) (Races in bold indicate pole position)

Year	Team	Chassis	No.	Engine	1	2	3	4	5	6	7	8	9	10	11	Rank	Points	Ref
1996–97	Blueprint Racing	Dallara IR7	16	Oldsmobile Aurora V8	NHM	LVS	WDW	PHX; 10	INDY; 31	TXS; 23	PPI					**27th**	**76**	
1996–97	LP Racing	Dallara IR7	99	Oldsmobile Aurora V8								CLT; 18	NH2; 22	LV2; 27		**27th**	**76**	
1998	LP Racing	Dallara IR8	99	Oldsmobile Aurora V8	WDW; 9	PHX; 7	INDY; 26	TXS; 18	NHM; 12	DOV; 17	CLT; 14	PPIR; 13	ATL; 15	TX2; 27	LVS; 2	**14th**	**186**	
1999	Treadway Racing	G-Force GF01C	99	Oldsmobile Aurora V8	WDW; 27	PHX; 9	CLT; C^{1}	INDY; 30	TXS; 3	PPI; 2	ATL; 22	DOV; 5	PP2; 5	**LVS**; 1	TX2; 22	**5th**	**233**	

^{1} The 1999 VisionAire 500K at Charlotte was cancelled after 79 laps due to spectator fatalities.

== Other ==
- Schmidt won $16,350 on Press Your Luck over the course of three episodes between January 2–4, 1985.
- He established the Sam Schmidt Paralysis Foundation to further the cause of paralysis research, treatment and quality-of-life issues.
- He partnered with Arrow Electronics in his effort to drive again by creating a 2014 Chevrolet Corvette Stingray that is controlled with head movement, voice commands, and by mouth sip/puff actions.
- Schmidt currently serves on the board of directors for BraunAbility, a leading manufacturer of wheelchair accessible vehicles and other mobility solutions.
- Schmidt is co-owner of Speed Vegas motorpark.
