= Matt Sielsky =

American racing driver

- Born: February 12, 1978 (age 48)

Previous series
- 2000-2001 1999 1998-1999 1997-1996: ASA National Tour; NASCAR Busch Series; Atlantic Championship; USF2000

Awards
- 1997: Team USA Scholarship

NASCAR O'Reilly Auto Parts Series career
- 1 race run over 1 year
- Best finish: 116th (1999)
- First race: 1999 Kroger 200 (IRP)
Wins	Top tens	Poles
0	0	0

Matt Sielsky (born 1 May 1978) is an American former racing driver. Sielsky competed in USF2000, Atlantic Championship, NASCAR O'Reilly Auto Parts Series, among other series.

== Career ==
The Chicago, Illinois based driver started his racing career in karting. In 1993 Sielsky won his first World Karting Association national championship. Sielsky won the Restricted JR and US820 Junior class championships beating other drivers such as Sam Hornish Jr. After a year without national championships in 1994, Sielsky won two out of four classes he competed in 1995. Sielsky won the Piston Port and 100cc Pro Street classes.

For 1996 Sielsky and fellow competitor Jeff Shafer landed Kool sponsorship after a talent competition. With the sponsorship deal Sielsky joined Team Green in the USF2000 for 1996 and 1997. In his debut season the young driver finished third at Watkins Glen International and scored enough points to secure tenth in the championship. For 1997 Sielsky scored four pole positions, in the streets of St. Petersburg, at Phoenix International Raceway, Pikes Peak International Raceway and Mid-Ohio Sports Car Course. Unfortunately, he failed to finish better than second during the season. The total of four podium finishes resulted in a second place in the very closely contested championship.

Sielsky remained kept the Kool sponsorship as he graduated into the Atlantic Championship for 1998 racing with D&L Racing. In the second race of the season, at Nazareth Speedway, he scored his first podium finish. Two additional podium finishes came at the Molson Indy Vancouver and Mid-Ohio. The young driver finished sixth in the series standings.

With severe limitations to cigarette sponsorship in sports, Sielsky lost his primary sponsor. Forced to look for other opportunities. In 1999, he made a single appearance in the Atlantic Championship. With BBGP Racing Sielsky substituted for John Brooks at Mid-Ohio. Sielsky finished the race in fourteenth place. Sielsky also joined Emerald Performance Group testing the teams NASCAR Busch Series car. He got the chance to race in the Busch Series with Hillin Racing. At Lucas Oil Raceway, Sielsky qualified 39th for the Kroger 200. Sielsky finished the race 31st, six laps down.

Sielsky had a partial racing season in 2000 racing in the ASA National Tour. The season was a preparation for his first full-time stock car campaign in the 2001 ASA National Tour. Fielding his own team Sielsky finished nineteenth in the season standings. His best result was a ninth-place finish at Concord Speedway, after starting 34th.

After his racing career, Sielsky, with the support of his mother, started a Chicago-style hot dog restaurant in the Charlotte, North Carolina area. Sielsky sold the restaurant, Matt's Chicago Dog, in 2010 before rejoining the restaurant as its Chief operating officer in 2016. Following that Matt has enjoyed a successful career of working with friends to help them reduce operating costs through Buyers Edge Platform.

== Motorsports results ==
=== American Open-Wheel racing results ===
(key) (Races in bold indicate pole position, races in italics indicate fastest race lap)

==== USF2000 National Championship ====
Year	Entrant	1	2	3	4	5	6	7	8	9	10	11	12	Pos	Points
1996	Team Green	WDW; DNQ	STP; 9	PIR; 23	DSC; 44	MOS; 6	IRP; 27	RIR; 22	WGI; 3	WGI; 4	MOH; 8	NHS; 7	LVS; 25	10th	???
1997	Team Green	WDW; 12	**STP**; 2	**PIR**; 25	DSC; 23	DSC; 4	SAV; 8	**PPI**; 10	CHA; 2	CHA; 26	**MOH**; 2	WGI; 3	WGI; 5	2nd	177

==== Atlantic Championship ====
Year	Team	1	2	3	4	5	6	7	8	9	10	11	12	13	Rank	Points
1998	D&L Racing	LBH; 24	NAZ; 3	GAT; 7	MIL; 4	MTL; 4	CLE; 10	TOR; 4	TRR; 8	MOH; 3	ROA; 23	VAN; 3	LS; 18	HOU; 9	6th	109
1999	BBGP Racing	LBH	NAZ	GAT	MIL	MTL	ROA	TRR	MOH; 14	CHI; 14	VAN	LS	HOU		-	-

=== NASCAR ===
(key) (Bold – Pole position awarded by qualifying time. Italics – Pole position earned by points standings or practice time. * – Most laps led.)

==== Busch Series ====
NASCAR Busch Series results
Year	Team	No.	Make	1	2	3	4	5	6	7	8	9	10	11	12	13	14	15	16	17	18	19	20	21	22	23	24	25	26	27	28	29	30	31	32	NBSC	Pts	Ref
1999	Hillin Racing	8	Chevy	DAY	CAR	LVS	ATL	DAR	TEX	NSV	BRI	TAL	CAL	NHA	RCH	NZH	CLT	DOV	SBO	GLN	MLW	MYB	PPR	GTY	IRP; 31	MCH	BRI	DAR	RCH	DOV	CLT	CAR	MEM	PHO	HOM	116th	70	
