= Lucas Oil School of Racing =

Automotive racing education program

The Lucas Oil School of Racing is a racing school located in Port Richey, Florida that launched in December 2015. In 2016, Lucas Oil School of Racing was chosen to host the finals for both the Team USA Scholarship and Mazda Road to Indy USF2000 Scholarship shootouts.

== Formula Car Education ==
Basic 2-Day programs are offered at more than a dozen race tracks in North America. A combination of classroom instruction and on-track driving teach the fundamentals of operating and driving a race car. Successful completion of a Basic 2-Day program qualifies a driver for a SCCA Regional Competition License.

Advanced Lapping is offered alongside Basic 2-Day programs, and provide drivers with seat time to build experience. Drivers are introduced to the data recorded during their on-track sessions.

The Lucas Oil Formula Car Race Series is an entry-level, arrive-and-drive formula racing series for young drivers transitioning from karting into race cars, as well as drivers interested in racing as an avocation.

Private Events are custom events executed for corporate groups, driving clubs, and other organizations looking for exclusive branding and training for their members and clients.

== The Vehicles ==
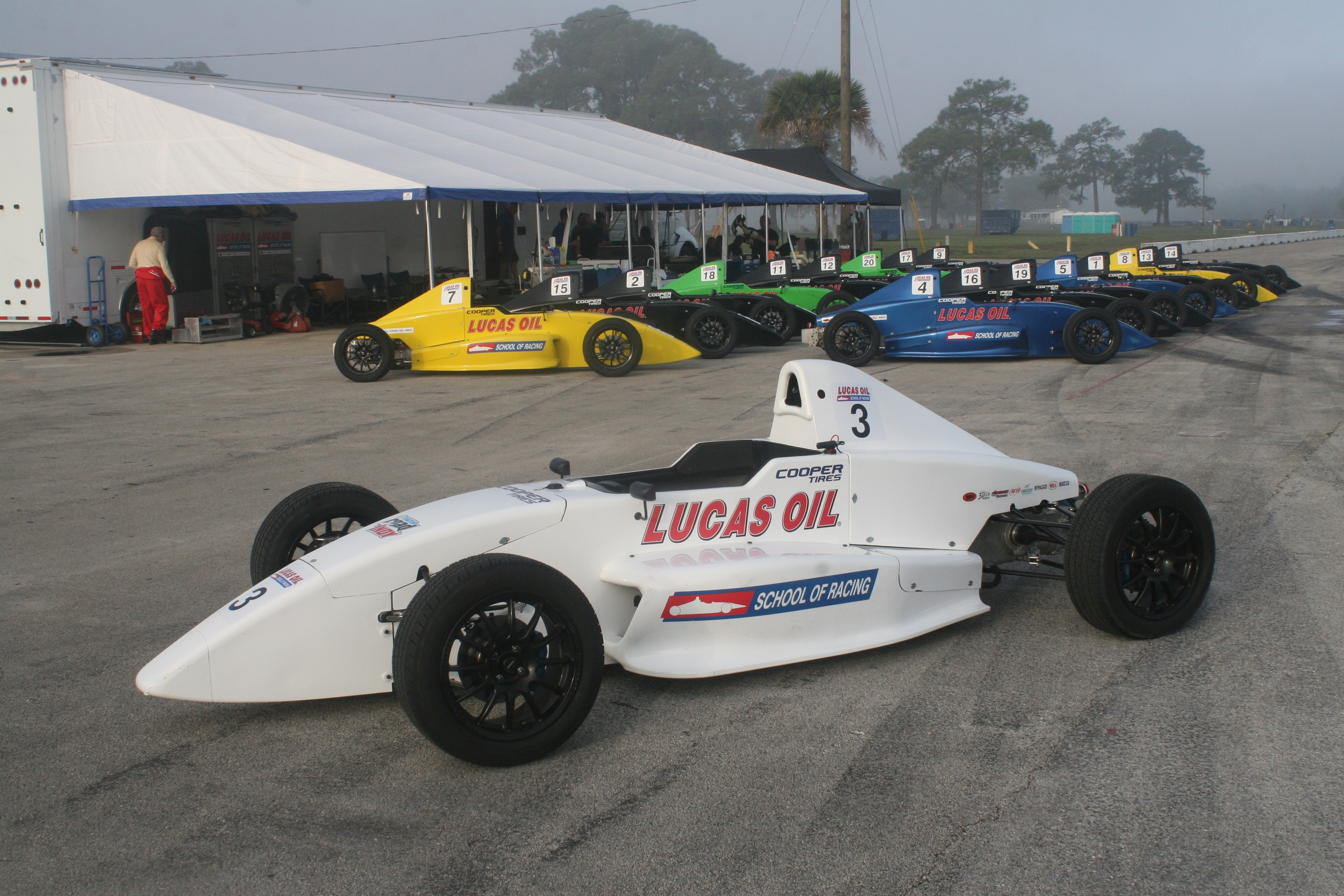
A Ray Race Cars GR-RSC

The Lucas Oil School of Racing maintains a fleet of (20) purpose built Ray Race Cars GR-RSC open-wheel formula type race cars. Each car is powered by a two-liter, normally-aspirated engine backed by a Sadev five-speed sequential transmission controlled by Pro Shift steering wheel mounted paddle shifter. Each car is equipped with AiM Sportline digital display steering wheel, data acquisition, and in-car video systems, and rides on Cooper Tires.
