= Nicolas Rondet =

- Nationality: (France) French
- Born: March 9, 1970 (age 56) Melle, Deux-Sèvres

IMSA Michelin Pilot Challenge
- Years active: 2011

Previous series
- 2011 2002 2001 1998–1999 1997–1998 1995–1996 1994–1995 1993 1992 1991: Continental Tire Sports Car Challenge; Atlantic Championship; Barber Dodge Pro Series; Atlantic Championship; Barber Dodge Pro Series; Skip Barber Western Series; French Citroën AX Cup; British Formula Ford; Formula First; French F3

Championship titles
- 2001 1996: Barber Dodge Pro Series; Skip Barber Western Series

Awards
- 1996: Skip Barber Big Scholarship

Nicolas Rondet is a former Barber Dodge Pro Series and Atlantic Championship driver from Melle, Deux-Sèvres, France.

== Career history ==
After he was born in France he grew up in Brazil and started karting. After a short career in karting and single-seaters, he switched to touring cars. He won his first season in the French Citroën AX Cup in 1993. The following season Rondet finished fifth in the series. After this success, he moved to the United States of America to race in the Skip Barber Western Series. In his second season, he won the championship and the Skip Barber Big Scholarship. The scholarship secured him a seat in the 1997 Barber Dodge Pro Series season. The season was successful as he won one race and scored another two podium finishes. The following season, he secured his seat due to his sponsors. Again he scored three podium finishes but he had to miss three races. 1998 was also the first season Rondet made his debut in the Atlantic Championship racing at Long Beach and Houston. His best finish was a seventh place at Houston. Rondet also raced a single outing in the IMSA GT Championship. At Lime Rock Park. he finished thirteenth in a Mazda RX-7. He returned for a partial Atlantic Championship season the following year. He was places eleventh in the championship scoring one podium finish. After failing to secure a seat for the 2000 season, he returned to the Barber Dodge Pro Series in 2001. This season was highly successful as he finished every race in the top-ten, winning three races. As he won the title, he won a scholarship to race in the 2002 Atlantic Championship season. This season was not so successful as he finished in the top-ten only twice.

== Complete motorsports results ==
=== American Open-Wheel racing results ===
(key) (Races in bold indicate pole position, races in italics indicate fastest race lap)

==== Barber Dodge Pro Series ====
| Year | 1 | 2 | 3 | 4 | 5 | 6 | 7 | 8 | 9 | 10 | 11 | 12 | Rank | Points |
|---|---|---|---|---|---|---|---|---|---|---|---|---|---|---|
| 1997 | STP; 28 | SEB; 4 | SAV; 10 | LRP; 4 | MOH; 8 | WGI; 9 | MIN; 1 | **MOH**; 2 | ROA; 5 | LS; 4 | REN; 4 | LS; 3 | **5th** | **125** |
| 1998 | SEB; 18 | LRP; 15 | DET; 25 | WGI; 9 | CLE; 2 | GRA; 3 | MOH; 2 | ROA; 4 | LS1 | ATL | HMS | LS2; 16 | **7th** | **67** |
| 2001 | SEB; 3 | **PIR**; 1 | LRP1; 10 | LRP2; 5 | DET; 5 | CLE; 7 | TOR; 5 | **CHI**; 1 | MOH; 1 | ROA; 3 | VAN; 2 | LS; 4 | **1st** | **155** |

==== Atlantic Championship ====
| Year | Team | 1 | 2 | 3 | 4 | 5 | 6 | 7 | 8 | 9 | 10 | 11 | 12 | 13 | Rank | Points |
|---|---|---|---|---|---|---|---|---|---|---|---|---|---|---|---|---|
| 1998 | World Speed Motorsports | LBH; 24 | NAZ | GAT | MIL | MTL | CLE | TOR | TRR | MOH | ROA | VAN | LS | HOU; 7 | **27th** | **9** |
| 1999 | World Speed Motorsports | LBH; 21 | NAZ; 7 | GAT; 5 | MIL; 4 | MTL; 26 | ROA; 25 | TRR; 3 | MOH; 25 | CHI | VAN | LS; 17 | HOU; 23 | | **11th** | **40** |
| 2002 | Condor Motorsports | MTY | LBH; 14 | MIL; 18 | LS; 10 | POR; 15 | CHI; 22 | TOR; 9 | CLE; 22 | TRR; 15 | ROA; 13 | MTL; 17 | DEN; 22 | | **20th** | **20** |

Sporting positions
| Preceded by Nilton Rossoni | Barber Dodge Pro Series Champion; 2001 | Succeeded by A. J. Allmendinger |
