= John Brooks (racing driver) =

American racing driver (born 1959)

- Nationality: (United States) American
- Born: August 7, 1959 (age 67) Tucson, Arizona, U.S.

Atlantic Championship
- Years active: 1992-1999
- Starts: 38
- Wins: 0
- Poles: 0
- Best finish: 23rd in 1992

Previous series
- 1990: American Racing Series

John Brooks (born August 7, 1959) is an American racing driver who competed in the American Racing Series, the Atlantic Championship, and attempted to qualify for one CART race in 1993.

== Motorsports career results ==
=== American Open-Wheel ===
==== American Racing Series ====
(key)

Year	Team	1	2	3	4	5	6	7	8	9	10	11	12	13	14	Rank	Points
1990	Baci Racing	PIR	LB	MIL	DET	POR	CLE	MEA	TOR	DEN; 7	VAN	MDO	ROA	NAZ	LAG	22	6

==== Atlantic Championship ====
(key)

Year	Team	1	2	3	4	5	6	7	8	9	10	11	12	13	14	15	Rank	Points
1992		MIA	PIR; 2	LB; Ret	LIM; Ret	MTL; 10	WAT; 15	TOR	TSR	VAN	MDO	MOS	NAZ	LAG1; 20	LAG2; Ret		23rd	23
1993	Port-A-Cool Racing	PIR; DNS	LB	ATL	MIL	MOS	MTL	HAL	TOR	LOU	TSR	VAN	MDO	NAZ	LAG1	LAG2	NR	0
1995		MIA	PIR; Ret	NAZ; Ret	LB	MIL	MTL	TOR	TSR1	TSR2	MDO	VAN	LAG				NR	0
1996	Port-A-Cool Racing	MIA	LB; Ret	NAZ	MIL	MTL	TOR	TSR1	TSR2	MDO	ROA	VAN	LAG				NR	0
1997	Port-A-Cool Racing	MIA	LB; Ret	NAZ; DNS	MIL; 26	MTL; Ret	CLE	TOR; 17	TSR	MDO; Ret	ROA; 18	VAN; Ret	LAG; Ret				NR	0
1998	Port-A-Cool Racing	LB; Ret	NAZ; DNS	GAT; Ret	MIL; Ret	MTL; Ret	CLE; 17	TOR; Ret	TSR; Ret	MDO; 17	ROA; Ret	VAN; Ret	LAG; Ret	HOU; 12			33rd	4
1999	Port-A-Cool Racing	LB; 14	NAZ; Ret	GAT; 13	MIL; Ret	MTL; 16	ROA; 19	TSR; Ret	MDO	CHI	VAN	LAG	HOU; Ret				27th	1

==== CART ====
(key)

Year	Team	1	2	3	4	5	6	7	8	9	10	11	12	13	14	15	16	Rank	Points	Ref
1993	Paragon Racing	SUR	PHX	LBH	INDY	MIL	DET	POR	CLE	TOR	MIC	LOU	ROA	VAN	MDO	NAZ	LAG; DNQ	NR	0	
