= Jeff Shafer =

American racing driver (born 1975)

Jeff Shafer (born February 20, 1975) is a former racing driver. Shafer competed in USF2000, Atlantic Championship among other series.

== Career ==
Shafer started his racing career in karting. Shafer won the IKF Sprint Grand National. At Iowa International Raceway in Marshalltown, Iowa, Shafer won the Yamaha KT100S Heavy class.

Shafers first experience in autosport came at the Winfield Racing School in France. A strong performance earned him a scholarship for the 1996 Skip Barber championship. At Las Vegas Motor Speedway Shafer was one of two winners of the inaugural Team Green Academy Young American Driver Development Program, the other being Matt Sielsky. With Team KOOL Green, Shafer competed in the 1997 U.S. F2000 National Championship. Racing the experimental Nemesis 97 chassis, Shafer struggled in the opening rounds. His breakthrough came round five, at Phoenix International Raceway. On the road course configuration, Shafer beat 35 other drivers winning the race. The championship rookie finished twelfth in the point championship. Teammate Sielsky finished second in the championship racing the dominant Van Diemen chassis.

For 1998, Shafer joined Duncan Dayton's Highcroft Racing. The team was also the importer of the Bowman BC5 F2000 chassis. Despite two top ten finishes, Shafer left the team after the second round. The American also ran a partial Atlantic Championship schedule. After testing with PPI Motorsports at Firebird Raceway and Buttonwillow Raceway Park, Shafer made his race debut at the Milwaukee Mile. Highlight of the season was his pole position at the Molson Indy Vancouver, in support of the 1998 Molson Indy Vancouver. During the races he was sponsored by the Derek Daly Academy. The racing school also support the driver for his Formula Palmer Audi campaign in Great Britain along with support from Jerry Forsythe. His best result was a fourth place at Mondello Park. Shafer placed 16th in the championship standings.

After his active racing career, Shafer was lead instructor and general manager of Derek Daly Academy. He also was the lead engineer at Team Bucknam Racing for Brian Selby in the 2000 Star Mazda Championship. In 2007, Shafer founded Radical Ventures, organizing American championships for Radical Sportscars.

== One Motorsports ==
=== IMSA Lites ===
In 2013, Shafer founded One Motorsports out of Las Vegas, Nevada. The team made its debut in the IMSA Lites championship in 2014. The team bought two Élan DP02 chassis, numbers 49 and 50 built. The team made its debut with John Falb and Tony Bullock. Bullock scored the first win for the team, at Kansas Speedway. Falb eventually finished highest in the standings, in fourth place. For 2015, the team finished third in the team standings as the team expanded to four cars. Gerhard Watzinger was the best performing One Motorsports driver in 2016 finishing eighth in the season standings. With the Élan DP02 being phased out after the 2018 season, One Motorsports scaled back to running two part-time entries in 2017, with drivers Dave House and Paul LaHaye. At Sebring in 2018, One Motorsports had its best results, with House finishing first in his Élan DP02, and LaHaye taking second.

=== Radical Sportscars ===
As the west-coast based dealer for the British Radical Sportscars brand, One Motorsports competed the cars at various championships. Shafer previously competed with both Radical Ventures and Factory48 Motorsports in the 25 Hours of Thunderhill. Racing a Radical SR3 the team scored class wins in 2010, 2011, 2012 and 2013. For 2014 Shafer's team competed with both a Radical SR3 and a Radical SR8. Colin Braun, Sean Rayhall and Shafer himself were among the drivers. The team finished second and third in the ESR class. Rayhall returned the following year, along with Shafer and John Falb. The team was disqualified after a breach of regulations during a pitstop. For 2016 the team finished third and fourth in the ESR class in the famous endurance race. In 2018 Shafer had two Radical SR3s entered under One Motorsports, the team finished first and third in the ESR class.

== Motorsports results ==
=== American Open-Wheel racing results ===
(key) (Races in bold indicate pole position, races in italics indicate fastest race lap)

==== USF2000 National Championship ====
Year	Entrant	1	2	3	4	5	6	7	8	9	10	11	12	13	14	Pos	Points
1997	Team KOOL Green	WDW	STP; 24	PIR; 36	DSC1; 27	DSC2; 1	**SAV**; 34	PPI; 18	CHA1; 7	CHA2; 3	MOH; 4	WGI; 14	WGI; 40			12th	102
1998	Highcroft Racing	WDW; 7	PIR; 9	HMS1	HMS2	WGI	WGI	MOH1	MIN	CHA1	CHA2	MOH2	ATL	PPI	PPI	33rd	36

==== Atlantic Championship ====
Year	Team	1	2	3	4	5	6	7	8	9	10	11	12	13	Rank	Points
1998	PPI Motorsports	LBH	NAZ	GAT	MIL; 7	MTL	CLE	TOR	TRR; 6	MOH; 4	ROA	**VAN**; 17	LS	HOU	18th	32

=== Formula Palmer Audi ===
(key)

Year	1	2	3	4	5	6	7	8	9	10	11	12	13	14	15	Rank	Points
1999	THR; 18	BRH; 15	BRH; 8	MON; 4	MON; 22	SNE; 12	SNE; 8	BRH; 23	DON; 19	DON; 17	SIL; 10	BRH; 22	BRH; 16	THR; 22	THR; 12	16th	81
