= 2016 Mazda Road to Indy Shootout =

(United States) 2016 Mazda Road to Indy Shootout
Race details
- Date: December 6 & 7, 2016
- Official name: Mazda Road to Indy Shootout
- Course: Road course 2.238 mi / 3.602 km

Pole position
- Driver: (United Kingdom) Oliver White

Podium
- First: (United States) Oliver Askew
- Second: (United Kingdom) Oliver White
- Third: (United States) Trenton Estep

The 2016 Mazda Road to Indy Shootout was the first edition of the Road to Indy Shootout. The event was held at Mazda Raceway Laguna Seca on December 6 and 7. The winner received a $200,000 scholarship to compete in the 2017 U.S. F2000 National Championship.

== Entry list ==
Driver	Age	2016 result
(United States) Ryan Norman	18	Atlantic Championship Series champion^{6}
(Australia) Will Brown	18	Australian Formula Ford highest eligible driver (2nd).^{4}
(Republic of Ireland) Niall Murray	21	BRSCC F1600 champion
(United Kingdom) Oliver White	23	Mountney Formula Ford Super Series
(United States) Peter Portante	20	F1600 Formula F Championship runner-up^{1}
(United States) John McCusker	20	F2000 Championship Series runner-up^{2} ^{6}
(United States) Jonathan Sugianto	21	Formula Car Challenge champion ^{3}
(Mexico) Axel Matus	18	Formula Panam champion
(United States) Trenton Estep	16	Formula Tour 1600 champion
(Brazil) Marcel Coletta	14	Mazda Road to Indy Brazil champion
(India) Karthik Tharani	22	MMSC 1600 Indian Championship runner-up^{5}
(New Zealand) Michael Scott	21	New Zealand Formula Ford Championship champion
(United States) Tim de Silva	20	Pacific F2000 champion
(United States) Austin Garrison	18	Rotax Max Challenge
(United States) Nigel Saurino	21	SCCA Runoffs – FC
(United States) Neil Verhagen	15	SCCA Runoffs – F1600 champion^{6}
(United States) Matt Machiko	25	SCCA Runoffs – FM
(United Kingdom) Neil MacLennan	18	Scottish Motor Racing Club Formula Ford 1600 Championship champion
(United States) Timo Reger	19	Skip Barber Race Series
(United States) Oliver Askew	19	Team USA Scholarship
(United States) Kyle Kirkwood	18	Team USA Scholarship

=== Notes ===
^1 Neil Verhagen won the 2016 F1600 Championship Series. But as he was already qualified by winning the Runoffs, runner-up Peter Portante was awarded a place to compete.

^2 McCusker finished second in the 2016 F2000 Championship Series. The championship was won by Steve Bamford, a masters class competitor, ineligible because of his age. Drivers must be between 14 and 25.

^3 Formula Car Challenge FormulaSpeed champion Sugianto won the shootout invitation over Formula Car Challenge Pro Formula Mazda champion Bruno Carneiro after a video competition.

^4 Brown finished second in the 2016 Australian Formula Ford championship. The championship was won by Leanne Tander, ineligible because of her age (36).

^5 Tharani finished second in the MRF1600 (India) championship, but champion Vikash Anand is facing indictment for drunk driving from a September crash where Anand was driving under the influence, and thereby disqualified.

^6 Verhagen, McCusker and Norman all qualified, but were unable to attend due to prior commitments clashing with the shootout date. Verhagen tested at the annual Road to Indy Chris Griffis Test at the Indianapolis Motor Speedway, scoring the fastest time in the test with Pabst Racing. Norman signed with Andretti Autosport on December 5, 2016, to participate in Indy Lights for the 2017 season.

== Mazda Road to Indy - Brasil ==
The 2016 Mazda Road to Indy - Brasil was a karting contest to qualify for the finals at Mazda Raceway Laguna Seca. The event was held at Kartódromo de Interlagos on 27 August 2016. The event was set up by former racing driver Paulo Carcasci. Eleven drivers from four different Brazilian states and the Federal District competed for a spot in the final at Laguna Seca.

=== Result ===
Rank	Driver	FP	Q	H1	H2	F	Points
1.	(São Paulo (state)) Marcel Coletta	3	9		2	1	55
2.	(São Paulo (state)) Murilo Coletta	2	8	1		2	51
3.	(São Paulo (state)) Vinicius Papareli	1	2		1	3	47
4.	(São Paulo (state)) Lucca Croce	6	4		3	4	35
5.	(São Paulo (state)) Jean Aguiar	9	1		4	5	33
6.	(Federal District (Brazil)) Pedro Cardoso	8	7	2		9	32
	(Rio de Janeiro (state)) Italo Barrilari	7	6	5		7	
	(Minas Gerais) Evandro Bambirra	4	5	4		8	
	(São Paulo (state)) Allan Croce	5	3	3		6	
	(Mato Grosso) Edgar Henrique	11	11		5	11	
	(São Paulo (state)) Erick Lutum	10	10		6	10	

== Format ==
Judges
(United States) Joel Miller	Mazda Motorsports factory driver
(United States) Spencer Pigot	Mazda Motorsports factory driver
(United States) Jonathan Bomarito	Mazda Motorsports factory driver
(United States) Andrew Carbonell	Mazda Motorsports factory driver
(Canada) Scott Goodyear	former IndyCar Series driver
(United States) Kyle Kimball	Mazda Motorsports operational manager
(United States) Jim Bowie	owner of Brandrenaline

Lucas Oil School of Racing supplied the 18 scholarship candidates with Formula Ford style cars. The Ray Race Cars GR-RSC was fitted with a 2-litre engine built by Elite Engines. All cars were shod with Cooper Tires. The Shootout started with orientation of the cars and the track on December 5. On the second day drivers were divided in four groups and took to the tracks. For the final Shootout day the group was again divided in four. After initial testing sessions the first drivers were eliminated. The remaining drivers started 30 minute qualifying sessions before the race over 30 minutes.

== Competition ==
All participants participated in a vehicle orientation and then multiple practice sessions over two days, culminating in a pre-qualification session where six finalists would be chosen. Those finalists would then participate in a 30-minute qualifying session and a 30-minute race.

Driver	Qualifying	Finale
(United States) Oliver Askew	3	1
(United Kingdom) Oliver White	1	2
(United States) Trenton Estep	4	3
(United States) Kyle Kirkwood	5	4
(Republic of Ireland) Niall Murray	6	5
(Australia) Will Brown	2	6
(Brazil) Marcel Coletta	DNQ	
(United States) Austin Garrison	DNQ	
(United States) Matt Machiko	DNQ	
(United Kingdom) Neil MacLennan	DNQ	
(Mexico) Axel Matus	DNQ	
(United States) Peter Portante	DNQ	
(United States) Timo Reger	DNQ	
(United States) Nigel Saurino	DNQ	
(New Zealand) Michael Scott	DNQ	
(United States) Tim de Silva	DNQ	
(United States) Jonathan Sugianto	DNQ	
(India) Karthik Tharani	DNQ	
(United States) John McCusker	DNA	
(United States) Ryan Norman	DNA	
(United States) Neil Verhagen	DNA	

=== Winner ===
Oliver Askew was selected as the winner of the shootout and won a scholarship to compete in the 2017 U.S. F2000 National Championship.
