= Team USA Scholarship =

(United States) Team USA Scholarship
- Founded: 1990
- Team principal(s): Jeremy Shaw; Bryan Herta; John Hildebrand; Steve Horne; Doug Mockett
- Current series: Formula Ford Festival; Walter Hayes Trophy; Mazda Road to Indy Shootout
- Former series: Formula Palmer Audi; EFDA Nations Cup; Formula 3 New Zealand Formula Ford
- Drivers' Championships: 1998 EFDA Winter Series (Edwards); 1999 Formula Palmer Audi Winter Series (Edwards); 2000 Formula Palmer Audi Winter Series (Giebler); 2006 Formula Palmer Autumn Trophy (Cameron); 2008 Formula Ford Festival (Newgarden); 2008 Walter Hayes Trophy (Daly); 2009 Walter Hayes Trophy (De Phillippi); 2012 Walter Hayes Trophy (Nunez); 2016 Mazda Road to Indy Shootout (Askew)

The Team USA Scholarship is a scholarship program which allows young American racecar drivers to compete outside of the United States. Each year, a competition is used to select the best young racecar drivers in the United States, then they are entered in highly competitive automobile racing events in an international racing environment (typically in Europe).

== History ==
=== Formula Ford Festival (part 1) ===
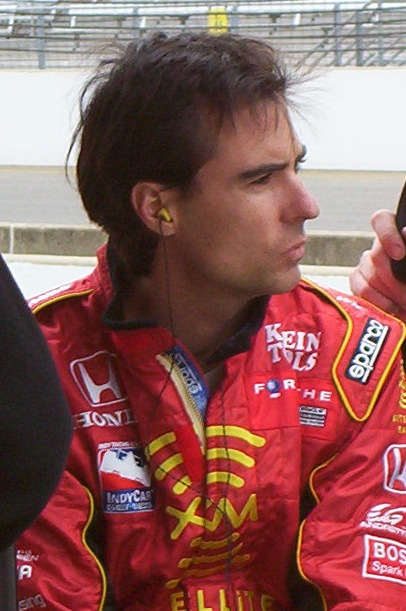
Winner of the 1991 scholarship, Bryan Herta.

The Scholarship was launched late in the 1990 racing season by the prominent automobile racing journalist Jeremy Shaw. The Scholarship was set up with initial support from IndyCar Series team owner Rick Galles, gentleman racer and business owner Jonathan Holtzman and Ford Special Vehicle Operations.

Canadian Formula Ford 2000 graduate Jimmy Vasser and USAC Sprint Car champion Jeff Gordon were selected to compete at the Formula Ford Festival. As Gordon had prior commitments in midget racing, so only Vasser made the trip to Brands Hatch. Vasser raced a Lanan 1604 chassis. The young American was involved in a crash with Steffan Nielsen in the heat race which ended is Festival. The following year the Scholarship again partnered with Lanan Racing, now racing a Reynard chassis. Herta qualified for the final race in 15th place and worked his way up to eleventh place. For 1992 two drivers were chosen to compete, Tony Ave and Ashton Lewis. The racers were selected after a test session at Snetterton. Primus Racing/John Village Automotive entered three Van Diemen RF92 chassis. Two were driven by Ave and Lewis, a third was driven by Geoff Boss as a guest driver. Boss was the fastest American driver qualifying fourth, but as his car did not pass technical inspection he had to start from the back of the grid. Lewis was the best Team USA Scholarship driver in the 1992 Formula Ford Festival finishing fifteenth. Boss was unable to advance after starting last in his heat race. Ave collided with John Oxborrow in his heat race and failed to finish. Jerry Nadeau was the sole driver selected for the Team USA Scholarship for 1993. The North Carolina native qualified on pole position for his heat race, winning the race in his year old Van Diemen RF92. He won the race with an advantage of over 26 seconds over Jan Neumann. After a second place in the semi-final race, Nadeau started the final in third. Racing with other young talents such as Craig Lowndes and Jan Erik Löfgren Nadeau had to settle for fourth place. In 1994, Mike Borkwoski and Clay Collier were selected to race in the Formula Ford Festival Zetec class. The Festival was unsuccessful for both drivers with neither progressing into the final race.

=== International F3 Trophy ===
For 1995 Team USA Scholarship had an agreement with Dick Bennetts, team owner of West Surrey Racing to field a Mugen-Honda powered Dallara F395 for a selected driver in the International Formula 3 Trophy. The race was run at Donington Park on 22 October 1995. Memo Gidley was selected and qualified the car in 16th position. Gidley finished the race in eleventh place after lengthy battles with Marc Cramer and Thomas Schwister. Owen McAuley won the race with Jason Elliott and Scott Lakin completing the podium.

=== EFDA Nations Cup ===
With Formula 3 deemed to expensive, the Team USA Scholarship returned to more affordable racing. The EFDA Nations Cup was selected, being a one-make series all drivers raced equal material. The cars were Reynard Formula Opel Lotus single seaters. Tony Renna was selected out of six finalists. Jerry Nadeau racing in the 1996 European Formula Opel Lotus championship, joined Renna in the Nations Cup event. After two races the team placed second in the overall standings of the 1996 EFDA Nations Cup, scoring the silver medal.

The team returned to the Nations Cup in 1997 with Buddy Rice and Matt Sielsky. Paul Edwards was selected as a third driver, racing in the Formula Ford Festival. Edwards started fifth in the Festival race and worked his way up to third. Unfortunately, a run in with Robert Lechner caused Edwards to retire. In the Nations Cup Rice and Sielsky struggled in qualifying with the setup and the team had to settle for fifth.

In 1998 Team USA Scholarship supported Paul Edwards in the final three rounds of the Formula Opel Euroseries and the EFDA Formula Opel Lotus Winter Series. His best finish was a fifth place at the Nürburgring with a Team USA Scholarship supported Motaworld Racing entry. In the Winter Series Edwards raced with Team Meritus. Edwards won at Donington Park and placed second at the Hockenheimring. Leading the championship into the final round, again at the Hockenheimring, Edwards won the championship by default as the final was canceled. Freezing winter conditions caused the organisation to abandon the final event. Edwards won the championship over other contenders such as Richard Lyons and Takuma Sato.

=== Formula Palmer Audi (part 1) ===
For 1999 Team USA Scholarship shifted focus to the Formula Palmer Audi Winter Series. A series set up by former Formula 1 driver Jonathan Palmer featuring one-make Van Diemen chassis powered by 1.8L Audi engines. Three drivers were selected to compete, Paul Edwards, Andy Lally and Jeff Simmons were selected to compete. Edwards won three out of four races (at Snetterton and Brands Hatch), with Paul Munn winning the fourth race. Edwards won the championship with an 8-point advantage. Lally finished fifth, Simmons eighth.

Phil Giebler and Joey Hand were selected for Team USA Scholarship for the 2000 Formula Palmer Audi Winter Series. Giebler scored three podiums and a win at Brands Hatch to claim the title. Hand scored a single podium finish, a second place at Snetterton, to settle for sixth in the championship.

=== New Zealand Formula Ford ===
In November 2001 twelve drivers were selected for a shootout style event at the Jim Russell Racing Driver School. A. J. Allmendinger and Bryan Sellers were selected for the 2001 Team USA Scholarship. Due to the relative inexperience with single seaters, Team USA Scholarship returned to Formula Ford, in New Zealand. The duo raced a partial season, with successes. Sellers won two races, both at Timaru, and placed ninth in the series championship. Sellers and Allmendinger placed second and third at the New Zealand Grand Prix, behind Fabian Coulthard. For 2003, three drivers were selected for the six race New Zealand International Formula Ford Series. Joe D'Agostino, Charlie Kimball and Ryan Millen. Millen, who is of New Zealand ancestry, is the nephew of 1980 New Zealand Grand Prix winner Steve Millen.

== Representatives (Scholarship Winners) ==
Year	Event(s)	Scholarship Winner(s)	Notes
1990	Formula Ford Festival	(California) Jimmy Vasser	
1991	Formula Ford Festival	(Michigan) Bryan Herta	
1992	Formula Ford Festival	(Virginia) Ashton Lewis (Indiana) Tony Ave	
1993	Formula Ford Festival	(North Carolina) Jerry Nadeau	
1994	Formula Ford Festival	(Florida) Mike Borkowski (Texas) Clay Collier	
1995	F3 International Trophy	(California) Memo Gidley	
1996	EFDA Nations Cup	(North Carolina) Jerry Nadeau (Florida) Tony Renna	
1997	EFDA Nations Cup	(Illinois) Matt Sielsky (Arizona) Buddy Rice	
1998	EFDA Nations Cup	(Colorado) Paul Edwards	
1999	Formula Palmer Audi Winter Series	(Colorado) Paul Edwards (Georgia (U.S. state)) Andy Lally (Connecticut) Jeff Simmons	Edwards won the 1999 Formula Palmer Audi Winter Series
2000	Formula Palmer Audi Winter Series	(California) Phil Giebler (California) Joey Hand	Giebler won the 2000 Formula Palmer Audi Winter Series
2001	New Zealand Formula Ford	(California) A. J. Allmendinger (Georgia (U.S. state)) Bryan Sellers	
2002	New Zealand Formula Ford	(California) A. J. Allmendinger (Georgia (U.S. state)) Bryan Sellers	
2003	New Zealand Formula Ford	(Florida) Joe D'Agostino (California) Charlie Kimball (California) Ryan Millen	
2004	New Zealand Formula Ford	(Oklahoma) Slade Miller	
2005	New Zealand Formula Ford	(California) J. R. Hildebrand	
2006	Formula Palmer Audi Autumn Trophy	(California) Robert Podlesni (California) Dane Cameron	Cameron won the 2006 Autumn Trophy
2007	Formula Palmer Audi Autumn Trophy	(California) Joel Miller (California) Patrick Barrett	
2008	Formula Ford Festival and Walter Hayes Trophy	(Tennessee) Josef Newgarden (Indiana) Conor Daly	Newgarden won the 2008 Formula Ford Festival (Kent class); Daly won the 2008 Walter Hayes Trophy
2009	Formula Ford Festival and Walter Hayes Trophy	(California) Brett Smrz (California) Connor De Phillippi	De Phillippi won the 2009 Walter Hayes Trophy
2010	Formula Ford Festival and Walter Hayes Trophy	(Florida) Felix Serralles (Florida) Spencer Pigot	
2011	Formula Ford Festival and Walter Hayes Trophy	(Florida) Spencer Pigot (New Jersey) Trent Hindman (California) Neil Alberico	
2012	Formula Ford Festival and Walter Hayes Trophy	(Florida) Tristan Nunez (Illinois) Jack Mitchell, Jr. (Florida) Matthew Brabham	Nunez won the 2012 Walter Hayes Trophy
2013	Formula Ford Festival and Walter Hayes Trophy	(California) Neil Alberico (Colorado) Jake Eidson (California) Joey Bickers	
2014	Formula Ford Festival and Walter Hayes Trophy	(Wisconsin) Aaron Telitz (Illinois) Michai Stephens	
2015	Formula Ford Festival and Walter Hayes Trophy	(Illinois) Michai Stephens (California) Dakota Dickerson	
2016	Formula Ford Festival Walter Hayes Trophy Mazda Road to Indy Shootout	(Florida) Oliver Askew (Florida) Kyle Kirkwood (Connecticut) Neil Verhagen	Askew won the 2016 Mazda Road to Indy Shootout
2017	Formula Ford Festival Walter Hayes Trophy Mazda Road to Indy Shootout	(Louisiana) Aaron Jeansonne (Florida) Jonathan Kotyk	
2018	Formula Ford Festival Walter Hayes Trophy Mazda Road to Indy Shootout	(California) Jake Craig (California) Colin Mullan	Braden Eves was originally chosen as a winner but was unable to compete due to a surgery.
2019	Formula Ford Festival and Walter Hayes Trophy	(New York (state)) Josh Green (California) Scott Huffaker	
2020	Formula Ford Festival and Walter Hayes Trophy	(Illinois) Bryce Aron (Indiana) Jackson Lee (Georgia (U.S. state)) Simon Sikes	
2021	Formula Ford Festival and Walter Hayes Trophy	(New York (state)) Andre Castro (New York (state)) Max Esterson	Esterson won the 2021 Walter Hayes Trophy
2022	Formula Ford Festival and Walter Hayes Trophy	(Michigan) Elliott Budzinski (California) William Ferguson (Ohio) Thomas Schrage	
2023	Formula Ford Festival and Walter Hayes Trophy	(Indiana) Ayrton Houk (Ohio) Jack Sullivan	
2024	USF2000 Championship	(Indiana) Ayrton Houk (Ohio) Thomas Schrage	

=== Representatives by state^{1} ===
No.	State
22	California
11	Florida
5	Illinois
3	Colorado; Indiana (New York (state)) New York
2	Connecticut (Georgia (U.S. state)) Georgia; Michigan; North Carolina; Ohio
1	Arizona; Louisiana; New Jersey; Oklahoma; Tennessee; Texas; Virginia; Wisconsin

==== Notes ====
^1 State as listed on the Team USA Scholarship website.

=== Other finalists ===
Year	Driver
1992	Greg Tracy
1992	Chris Simmons
1992	Geoff Boss
1992	Ernest Sikes
1996	Alex Barron
1996	Derek Hill
1996	Steve Knapp
1996	Allen May
1996	Bryan Selby
1997	Jeff Shafer
1997	Rocky Moran Jr.
1997	Chris Menninga
1997	Mikel Miller
1999	Aaron Justus
2000	Tom Dyer
2000	Ryan Hunter-Reay

- Danica Patrick and Patrick Long declined to compete for the 2000 Team USA Scholarship.
