= Indy 200 at Mid-Ohio =

IndyCar Series race

Honda Indy 200

IndyCar Series
- Venue: Mid-Ohio Sports Car Course
- Corporate sponsor: Honda
- First race: 1970
- First ICS race: 2007
- Distance: 203.22 mi (327.051 km)
- Laps: 90
- Previous names: Red Roof Inns 250k (1980); Escort Radar Warning 200 (1983–1988); Red Roof Inns 200 (1989); Red Roof Inns 200 Presented by Budweiser (1990); Pioneer Electronics 200 Presented by Budweiser (1991–1992); Pioneer Electronics 200 Presented by Miller Genuine Draft (1993); Miller Genuine Draft 200 (1994–1995); Miller 200 (1996–1997); Miller Lite 200 (1998–2001); CART Grand Prix of Mid-Ohio (2002); Champ Car Grand Prix of Mid-Ohio (2003); Honda 200 at Mid-Ohio Presented by Westfield Insurance (2007); Honda Indy Grand Prix at Mid-Ohio (2008)
- Most wins (driver): Scott Dixon (7)
- Most wins (team): Chip Ganassi Racing (13)
- Most wins (manufacturer): Chassis: Dallara (15); Engine: Honda (18)

The Honda Indy 200 at Mid-Ohio is an IndyCar Series race that is held at the Mid-Ohio Sports Car Course in Lexington, Ohio.

Pato O'Ward is the defending race winner, having won the 2026 event. Chip Ganassi Racing leads with 13 total victories for the organization, with Scott Dixon scoring seven of those wins.

Since 2007, the race has been sponsored by Honda. The sponsorship arrangement complements the track's close proximity to the manufacturer's assembly plants in Marysville, East Liberty, and Anna.

== Race history ==
Indy car racing first visited Mid-Ohio in the 1980 season. In late 1981, Truesports owner Jim Trueman purchased the Mid-Ohio facility, and early rumors had the track returning for the 1982 CART season. However, a race did not happen until 1983. CART then appeared annually through 2003. The race was well-attended, drawing fans from two major markets nearby, Columbus and Cleveland. Crowds topped 75,000-80,000 at the peak of its popularity. The race schedule usually included a large slate of support races including Indy Lights, Atlantics, and SCCA.

In mid-2003, CART president Chris Pook hinted at dropping Mid-Ohio from the CART schedule going forward, citing various issues. For many years, Mid-Ohio was on the schedule alongside the Grand Prix of Cleveland, and Pook stated it was not viable to have two races in such close proximity, and favored keeping the race at Cleveland instead. In addition, some observers felt that the powerful CART/Champ Cars had "outgrown" the narrow, winding course, citing a lack of passing and competition over the previous several years. Though the decision was generally unpopular with fans, Mid-Ohio was dropped from the Champ Car schedule for 2004.

Then in late 2006, it was announced that the race would be revived as part of the Indy Racing League. Restarting in 2007, the race would be sponsored by IRL engine supplier Honda, which has a prominent manufacturing presence in the central Ohio area.

Through much of its history, the track has been considered the hometown venue for first Truesports (1980s) and later Rahal Letterman Racing (1990s-present). Jim Trueman and the Trueman family owned the track from 1981 to 2007. Truesports scored two poles and two wins, while Rahal Letterman Racing has scored one pole and one win.

=== Race scheduling ===
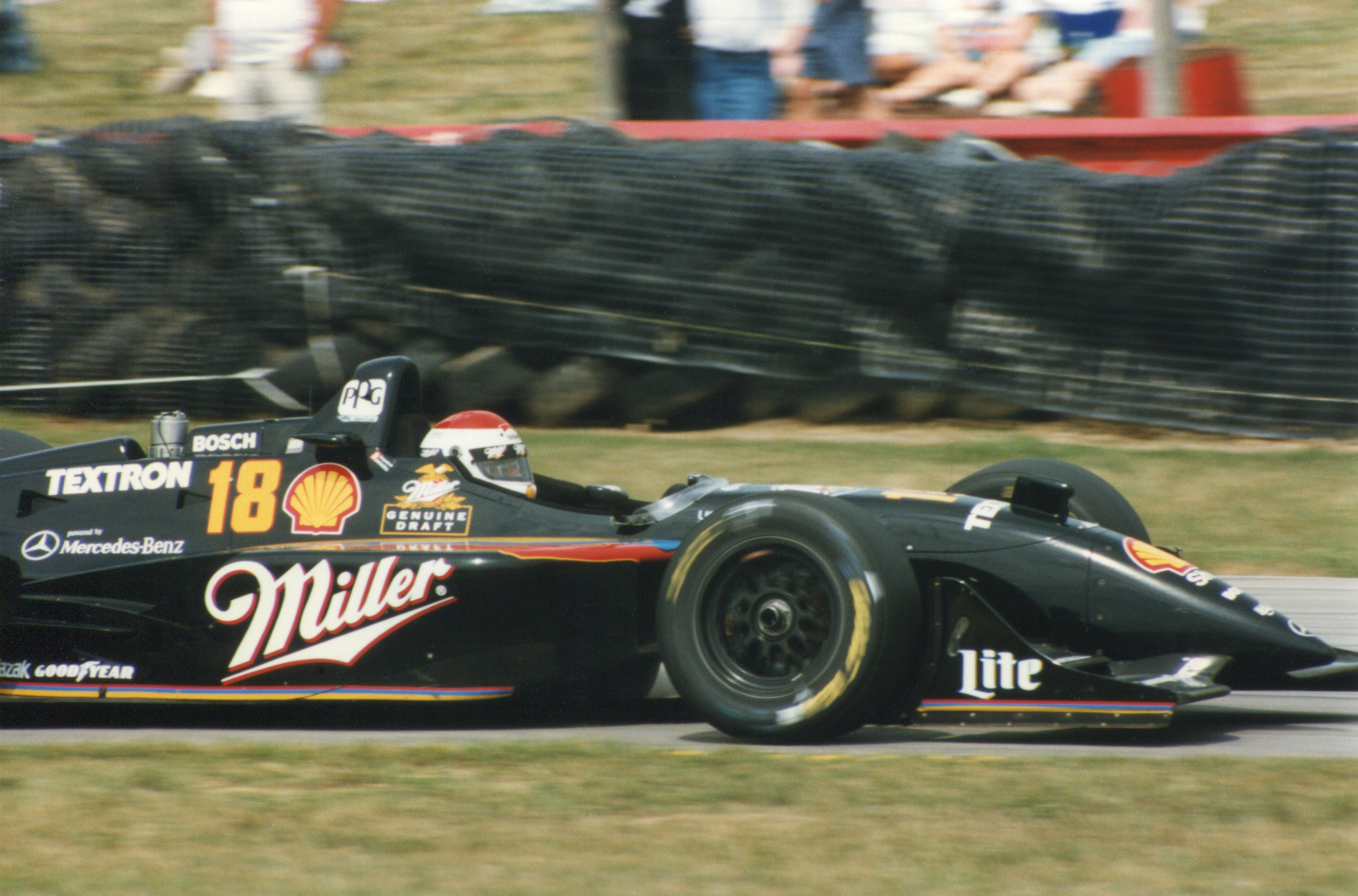
Two-time Mid-Ohio winner Bobby Rahal at the 1996 race.

In early years of the event under CART, the race was scheduled for Labor Day weekend. In 1990, it was pushed back two weeks into mid-September. Rain and cooler temperatures, however, prompted officials to move the race to the summer. For 1994, it was situated in early to mid-August, the weekend after the Brickyard 400.

When the race was revived by the Indy Racing League in 2007, it was placed in July. Carried by ABC, it was immediately followed final round coverage of the British Open. The lead-in created usually a strong television audience, but it was at the risk of the golf tournament running long due to a playoff, as it did in 2007. Starting in 2009, the race got moved back to its early August slot.

In 2020, due to the COVID-19 pandemic, the race originally scheduled for August 16 as it was moved up to the weekend of August 8–9 and was expanded to a doubleheader. It was to be the final race prior to the Indianapolis 500. Days later, however, it was postponed until a later date. Eventually, the doubleheader was rescheduled for the weekend of September 12–13. In 2021, the race was moved to July 4, and was held as a television doubleheader with the NASCAR Cup Series race at Road America.

=== Course layout ===
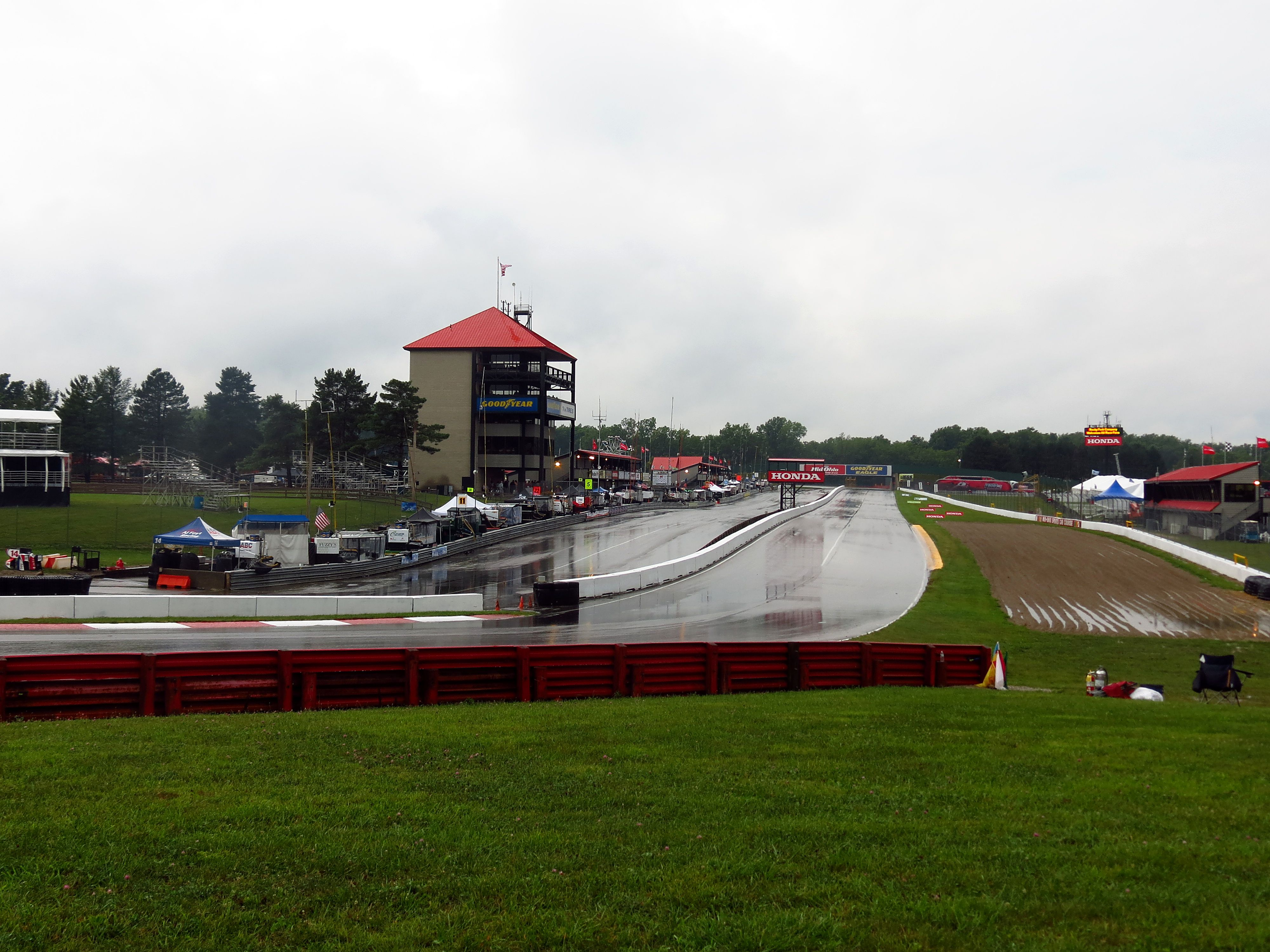
The start/finish and pit straight in preparations for the 2012 race.

Through 1989, the race utilized the original full 2.4-mile track layout, which included the chicane (turns 2 and 3) just before the keyhole (turn 4). During a track repaving project in early 1990, a straightaway segment was paved to create an alternate layout which bypasses the chicane. The alternate layout measured 2.25 miles. Since the 1990 race, the Indy cars have utilized the alternate course, bypassing the chicane and creating a passing zone going into the keyhole.

In all years except for 1980, the Indy cars have utilized the auxiliary starting line located at the midpoint of the backstretch. This allows the entire field to properly assemble into the grid formation, and start the race heading towards the best passing zone on the circuit. The pace car pulls off into the pits as normal, and allow the pole position car to pace the field all the way to the backstretch. Since the start/finish line at the pit straight is immediately proceeded by the tight and slow carousel, it does not allow for optimum racing into the first turn. The finish line and all other scoring is done at the line on the pit straight. Over the years, restarts after caution periods were previously done at the pit straight, but since 2017, sometimes those too have been moved to the auxiliary starting line.

The first lap of the race is not officially scored until the cars cross the auxiliary start line down on the backstretch. This removes approximately one mile from the first lap's distance, although teams still must factor in the distance in fuel calculations. From 1983 to 1989, the 84-lap race on the 2.4-mile circuit had an official distance of 200.25 miles. Likewise in 1990, the race distance for the 89-lap race on the 2.25 mile circuit was 199.3 miles. Though the race distance in laps has changed over the years, a similar deduction is still made in official race distance with respect to the race mileage.

== Past winners ==
Season	Date	Driver	Team	Chassis	Engine	Race Distance		Race Time	Average Speed (mph)	Report
Season	Date	Driver	Team	Chassis	Engine	Laps	Miles (km)	Race Time	Average Speed (mph)	Report
Formula A/Formula 5000 history
1970	September 27	(United States) George Follmer	O'Neil Racing	Lotus	Ford	42	100.8 (162.221)	1:03:21	95.464	Report
1971	July 5	(United States) Sam Posey	Champ Carr Inc.	Surtees	Chevrolet	60	144 (231.745)	1:31:11	94.75	Report
1972	Not held									
1973	June 3	(South Africa) Jody Scheckter	Taylor-Entin	Trojan	Chevrolet	42	100.8 (162.221)	1:02:32	96.708	Report
1974	June 2	(United Kingdom) Brian Redman	Haas Racing	Lola	Chevrolet	42	100.8 (162.221)	1:01:04	99.023	Report
1975	August 10	(United Kingdom) Brian Redman	Carl Haas/Jim Hall	Lola	Chevrolet	42	100.8 (162.221)	1:04:51	93.24	Report
1976	August 8	(United Kingdom) Brian Redman	Carl Haas/Jim Hall	Lola	Chevrolet	42	100.8 (162.221)	0:59:07	102.29	Report
1977 – 1979	Not held									
CART/Champ Car history
1980	July 13	(United States) Johnny Rutherford	Chaparral Cars	Chaparral	Cosworth	65	156 (251.057)	1:48:04	86.601	Report
1981 – 1982	Not held									
1983	September 11	(Italy) Teo Fabi	Forsythe Racing	March	Cosworth	84	201.6 (324.443)	2:01:49	98.755	Report
1984	September 3	(United States) Mario Andretti	Newman/Haas Racing	Lola	Cosworth	84	201.6 (324.443)	1:59:50	100.388	Report
1985	September 1	(United States) Bobby Rahal	TrueSports	March	Cosworth	84	201.6 (324.443)	1:52:23	107.041	Report
1986	August 31	(United States) Bobby Rahal (2)	TrueSports (2)	March	Cosworth	84	201.6 (324.443)	1:56:18	103.43	Report
1987	September 6	(Colombia) Roberto Guerrero	Andy Granatelli	March	Cosworth	84	201.6 (324.443)	1:51:58	107.431	Report
1988	September 4	(Brazil) Emerson Fittipaldi	Patrick Racing	Lola	Chevrolet-Ilmor	84	201.6 (324.443)	2:14:18	89.57	Report
1989	September 3	(Italy) Teo Fabi (2)	Porsche	March	Porsche	84	201.6 (324.443)	1:54:46	105.395	Report
1990	September 16	(United States) Michael Andretti	Newman/Haas Racing (2)	Lola	Chevrolet-Ilmor	89	200.25 (322.271)	2:19:27	85.751	Report
1991	September 15	(United States) Michael Andretti (2)	Newman/Haas Racing (3)	Lola	Chevrolet-Ilmor	89	200.25 (322.271)	1:59:49	99.789	Report
1992	September 13	(Brazil) Emerson Fittipaldi (2)	Penske Racing	Penske	Chevrolet-Ilmor	89	200.25 (322.271)	1:51:23	107.352	Report
1993	September 12	(Brazil) Emerson Fittipaldi (3)	Penske Racing (2)	Penske	Chevrolet-Ilmor	89	200.25 (322.271)	1:56:59	102.704	Report
1994	August 14	(United States) Al Unser Jr.	Penske Racing (3)	Penske	Ilmor	83	185.754 (298.942)	1:40:59	110.387	Report
1995	August 13	(United States) Al Unser Jr. (2)	Penske Racing (4)	Penske	Mercedes-Benz	83	186.75 (300.544)	1:44:04	107.11	Report
1996	August 11	(Italy) Alex Zanardi	Chip Ganassi Racing	Reynard	Honda	83	186.75 (300.544)	1:46:49	104.358	Report
1997	August 10	(Italy) Alex Zanardi (2)	Chip Ganassi Racing (2)	Reynard	Honda	83	187.414 (301.613)	1:41:16	110.456	Report
1998	August 9	(Mexico) Adrián Fernández	Patrick Racing (2)	Reynard	Ford-Cosworth	83	187.414 (301.613)	1:53:39	98.428	Report
1999	August 15	(Colombia) Juan Pablo Montoya	Chip Ganassi Racing (3)	Reynard	Honda	83	187.414 (301.613)	1:42:08	109.606	Report
2000	August 13	(Brazil) Hélio Castroneves	Penske Racing (5)	Reynard	Honda	83	187.414 (301.613)	1:44:59	106.558	Report
2001	August 12	(Brazil) Hélio Castroneves (2)	Penske Racing (6)	Reynard	Honda	83	187.414 (301.613)	1:44:54	106.627	Report
2002	August 11	(Canada) Patrick Carpentier	Forsythe Racing (2)	Reynard	Ford-Cosworth	92	207.736 (334.318)	1:56:17	106.68	Report
2003	August 10	(Canada) Paul Tracy	Forsythe Racing (3)	Lola	Ford-Cosworth	92	207.736 (334.318)	1:56:45	106.251	Report
2004 – 2006	Not held									
IRL/IndyCar Series history
2007	July 22	(New Zealand) Scott Dixon	Chip Ganassi Racing (4)	Dallara	Honda	85	191.93 (308.881)	1:47:24	107.222	Report
2008	July 20	(Australia) Ryan Briscoe	Penske Racing (7)	Dallara	Honda	85	191.93 (308.881)	2:01:23	94.873	Report
2009	August 9	(New Zealand) Scott Dixon (2)	Chip Ganassi Racing (5)	Dallara	Honda	85	191.93 (308.881)	1:46:06	108.541	Report
2010	August 8	(United Kingdom) Dario Franchitti	Chip Ganassi Racing (6)	Dallara	Honda	85	191.93 (308.881)	1:54:32	100.542	Report
2011	August 7	(New Zealand) Scott Dixon (3)	Chip Ganassi Racing (7)	Dallara	Honda	85	191.93 (308.881)	1:48:47	105.861	Report
2012	August 5	(New Zealand) Scott Dixon (4)	Chip Ganassi Racing (8)	Dallara	Honda	85	191.93 (308.881)	1:39:49	115.379	Report
2013	August 4	(United States) Charlie Kimball	Chip Ganassi Racing (9)	Dallara	Honda	90	203.22 (327.05)	1:43:29	117.825	Report
2014	August 3	(New Zealand) Scott Dixon (5)	Chip Ganassi Racing (10)	Dallara	Chevrolet	90	203.22 (327.05)	1:52:45	108.14	Report
2015	August 2	(United States) Graham Rahal	Rahal Letterman Lanigan Racing	Dallara	Honda	90	203.22 (327.05)	1:55:20	105.72	Report
2016	July 31	(France) Simon Pagenaud	Team Penske (8)	Dallara	Chevrolet	90	203.22 (327.05)	1:50:00	110.853	Report
2017	July 30	(United States) Josef Newgarden	Team Penske (9)	Dallara	Chevrolet	90	203.22 (327.05)	1:46:20	114.677	Report
2018	July 29	(United States) Alexander Rossi	Andretti Autosport	Dallara	Honda	90	203.22 (327.05)	1:44:15	116.957	Report
2019	July 28	(New Zealand) Scott Dixon (6)	Chip Ganassi Racing (11)	Dallara	Honda	90	203.22 (327.05)	1:45:15	115.837	Report
2020	September 12	(Australia) Will Power	Team Penske (10)	Dallara	Chevrolet	75	169.35 (272.54)	1:29:08	113.978	Report
2020	September 13	(United States) Colton Herta	Andretti Harding Steinbrenner Autosport (2)	Dallara	Honda	75	169.35 (272.54)	1:34:17	107.763	Report
2021	July 4	(United States) Josef Newgarden (2)	Team Penske (11)	Dallara	Chevrolet	80	180.64 (290.71)	1:39:58	108.405	Report
2022	July 3	(New Zealand) Scott McLaughlin	Team Penske (12)	Dallara	Chevrolet	80	180.64 (290.71)	1:46:43	101.557	Report
2023	July 2	(Spain) Álex Palou	Chip Ganassi Racing (12)	Dallara	Honda	80	180.64 (290.71)	1:37:31	111.125	Report
2024	July 7	(Mexico) Pato O'Ward	Arrow McLaren	Dallara	Chevrolet	80	180.64 (290.71)	1:33:22	116.071	Report
2025	July 6	(New Zealand) Scott Dixon (7)	Chip Ganassi Racing (13)	Dallara	Honda	90	203.22 (327.05)	1:49:41	111.166	Report
2026	July 5	(Mexico) Pato O'Ward (2)	Arrow McLaren (2)	Dallara	Chevrolet	90	203.22 (327.05)	1:43:23	117.932	Report

- 2020: Race postponed and it was made into a doubleheader (75 laps for each) due to the COVID-19 pandemic.

== Support race winners ==
USAC Mini-Indy series
Season	Date	Winning driver
1980	July 13	(New Zealand) Dave McMillan
American Racing Series
1986	August 31	(New Zealand) Steve Millen
1987	September 6	(Argentina) Juan Manuel Fangio II
1988	September 4	(Switzerland) Jon Beekhuis
1989	September 3	(United States) P. J. Jones
1990	September 16	(Canada) Paul Tracy
CART Indy Lights series
1991	September 15	(United States) Brian Till
1992	September 13	(United States) Robbie Groff
1993	September 12	(United States) Bryan Herta
1994	August 14	(Brazil) André Ribeiro
2000	September 13	(United States) Townsend Bell
2001	September 12	(United States) Townsend Bell
Indy Pro/Indy Lights series
2007	July 22	(United States) Richard Antinucci
2008	July 19	(Brazil) Raphael Matos
2008	July 20	(Australia) James Davison
2009	August 9	(Australia) James Davison
2010	August 8	(United Kingdom) Martin Plowman
2013	August 4	(Colombia) Gabby Chaves
2014	August 2	(United Kingdom) Jack Harvey
2014	August 3	(United Kingdom) Jack Harvey
2015	August 1	(United States) R.C. Enerson
2015	August 2	(United States) Sean Rayhall
2016	July 30	(Uruguay) Santiago Urrutia
2016	July 31	(Uruguay) Santiago Urrutia
2017	July 29	(Uruguay) Santiago Urrutia
2017	July 30	(France) Nico Jamin
2018	July 28	(Mexico) Patricio O'Ward
2018	July 29	(Mexico) Patricio O'Ward
2019	July 27	(United States) Oliver Askew
2019	July 28	(United States) Oliver Askew
2021	July 3	(United States) Kyle Kirkwood
2021	July 4	(United States) Kyle Kirkwood
2021	October 2	(United States) Kyle Kirkwood
2021	October 3	(Sweden) Linus Lundqvist
2022	July 3	(New Zealand) Hunter McElrea
Indy NXT
2023	July 2	(United Kingdom) Louis Foster
2024	July 7	(Brazil) Caio Collet
2025	July 6	(Norway) Dennis Hauger
2026	July 4	(Brazil) Enzo Fittipaldi
2026	July 5	(Brazil) Enzo Fittipaldi

Formula Ford 2000
Season	Date	Winning driver
1993	June 12	(United States) Chris Simmons
1995	August 12	(United States) Memo Gidley
1995	October 8	(United States) Jeret Schroeder
1996	August 10	(United States) Steve Knapp
1997	August 9	(Brazil) Zak Morioka
1998	June 14	(Australia) David Besnard
1998	August 8	(Australia) David Besnard
1999	June 5	(United Kingdom) Dan Wheldon
1999	August 14	(United States) Jeff Wright
2001	June 9	(Estonia) Tõnis Kasemets
2001	June 10	(United Kingdom) Doug Bell
2001	June 11	(United States) Jason LaPoint
Formula Ford Zetec
2002	June 30	(Estonia) Tõnis Kasemets
2002	August 10	(United States) Bryan Sellers
2002	August 11	(United States) Ross Fonferko
2003	June 28	(Estonia) Tõnis Kasemets
2003	June 29	(United Kingdom) Westley Barber
2003	August 9	(United States) Jonathan Bomarito
2003	August 10	(United States) Jonathan Bomarito
2004	June 26	(United States) Andrew Prendeville
2004	June 27	(United States) Adam Pecorari
2004	August 7	(United States) Adam Pecorari
2004	August 8	(United States) Adam Pecorari
U.S. F2000 National Championship
2011	August 6	(Finland) Petri Suvanto
2011	August 7	(Finland) Petri Suvanto
2012	August 4	(United States) Spencer Pigot
2012	August 5	(United States) Scott Anderson
2013	August 3	(United States) Neil Alberico
2013	August 3	(United States) Neil Alberico
2013	August 4	(Canada) Garett Grist
2014	August 1	(United States) R. C. Enerson
2014	August 2	(United States) Jake Eidson
2014	August 3	(France) Florian Latorre
2015	August 1	(France) Nico Jamin
2015	August 2	(France) Nico Jamin
2015	August 2	(France) Nico Jamin
2016	July 29	(Australia) Anthony Martin
2016	July 30	(Australia) Anthony Martin
2016	July 31	(Australia) Anthony Martin
2017	July 28	(United States) Oliver Askew
2017	July 29	(Canada) Parker Thompson
2018	July 27	(United States) Kyle Kirkwood
2018	July 28	(United States) Kyle Kirkwood
2018	July 29	(United States) Kyle Kirkwood
2019	July 27	(Denmark) Christian Rasmussen
2019	July 28	(New Zealand) Hunter McElrea
2020*	July 29	(Denmark) Christian Rasmussen
2020*	July 30	(Denmark) Christian Rasmussen
2020*	July 30	(Denmark) Christian Rasmussen
2020*	September 12	(United States) Michael d'Orlando
2020*	September 12	(United States) Reece Gold
2020*	September 13	(Denmark) Christian Rasmussen
2021	July 3	(United States) Michael d'Orlando
2021	July 3	(Brazil) Kiko Porto
2021	July 4	(United States) Michael d'Orlando
2021	October 3	(United States) Yuven Sundaramoorthy
2021	October 4	(United States) Josh Green
2022	July 1	(United States) Myles Rowe
2022	July 2	(United States) Myles Rowe
2022	July 2	(United States) Michael d'Orlando
2023	June 30	(Cyprus) Evagoras Papasavvas
2023	July 1	(Canada) Mac Clark
2023	July 1	(United States) Simon Sikes
2024	July 5	(United States) Max Taylor
2024	July 6	(Cyprus) Evagoras Papasavvas
2024	July 6	(United States) Max Taylor
2025	July 4	(United States) Caleb Gafrarar
2025	July 5	(United States) Jack Jeffers
2025	July 5	(United States) Jack Jeffers
2026	July 3	(Australia) Eddie Beswick
2026	July 4	(Canada) Anthony Martella

Formula Atlantic/Atlantic Championship
Season	Date	Winning driver
1986	September 27	(Canada) Scott Goodyear
1987	September 6	(United Kingdom) Calvin Fish
1988	September 4	(United States) Steve Shelton
1988	September 24	(United States) Steve Shelton
1989	June 4	(United States) Jocko Cunningham
1989	July 16	(United States) Colin Trueman
1991	September 14	(United States) Jimmy Vasser
1992	September 14	(United States) Stuart Crow
1993	September 11	(Canada) Jacques Villeneuve
1994	August 14	(United States) Colin Trueman
1995	August 13	(United States) Richie Hearn
1996	August 10	(Canada) Patrick Carpentier
1997	August 10	(United States) Alex Barron
1998	August 9	(Canada) Lee Bentham
1999	August 15	(Canada) Kenny Wilden
2003	August 17	(Canada) Michael Valiante
2009	August 8	(United States) Jonathan Summerton

Pro Mazda Championship
Season	Date	Winning driver
2013	August 3	(Australia) Matthew Brabham
2013	August 4	(Australia) Matthew Brabham
2014	August 2	(Brazil) Nicolas Costa
2014	August 3	(Canada) Garett Grist
2015	August 1	(Uruguay) Santiago Urrutia
2015	August 2	(United States) Neil Alberico
2016	July 30	(France) Nico Jamin
2016	July 30	(France) Nico Jamin
2017	July 28	(Australia) Anthony Martin
2017	July 29	(Brazil) Victor Franzoni
2017	July 30	(Australia) Anthony Martin
2018	July 28	(Netherlands) Rinus VeeKay
2018	July 29	(Netherlands) Rinus VeeKay
Indy Pro 2000 Championship
2019	July 27	(United States) Kyle Kirkwood
2019	July 28	(United States) Kyle Kirkwood
2020*	July 29	(United States) Braden Eves
2020*	July 30	(Russia) Artem Petrov
2020*	July 30	(United States) Sting Ray Robb
2020*	September 12	(Mexico) Manuel Sulaimán
2020*	September 13	(United States) Sting Ray Robb
2021	July 3	(Denmark) Christian Rasmussen
2021	July 4	(New Zealand) Hunter McElrea
2021	October 2	(Denmark) Christian Rasmussen
2021	October 3	(Republic of Ireland) James Roe Jr.
2022	July 2	(United Kingdom) Louis Foster
2022	July 3	(Brazil) Kiko Porto
USF Pro 2000 Championship
2023	July 1	(United States) Michael d'Orlando
2023	July 2	(United States) Myles Rowe
2024	July 5	(United States) Nikita Johnson
2024	July 6	(United States) Nikita Johnson
2025	July 4	(United States) Max Garcia
2025	July 5	(United States) Max Garcia
2026	July 3	(Brazil) Leonardo Escorpioni
2026	July 4	(Brazil) Leonardo Escorpioni
(Brazil) Leonardo Escorpioni	July 4	

Stadium Super Trucks
Season	Date	Winning driver	Ref
2019	July 27	(United States) Cole Potts	
2019	July 28	(United States) Gavin Harlien	
2021	July 3	(Australia) Matthew Brabham	
2021	July 4	(Australia) Matthew Brabham	
2022	July 2	(United States) Gavin Harlien	
2022	July 3	(United States) Max Gordon	

- Indy Pro 2000 and U.S. F2000 ran two weekends at the track in 2020 and to make up for races canceled by the COVID-19 pandemic. The first weekend was run as a standalone event on the originally scheduled IndyCar race weekend, while the second was run in support of the IndyCar Series on their rescheduled date. The two series, and Indy Lights, ran two weekends at the track in 2021. The first weekend was on the IndyCar Series weekend, and the second in October was run to replace the Toronto races cancelled by Ontario restrictions.

== Race summaries ==
=== Formula 5000 ===
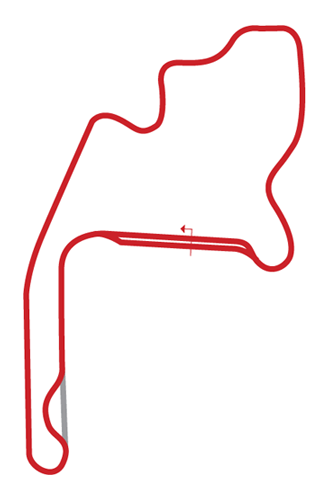
Mid-Ohio course layout (red) used through 1989.

- 1970: The first major open wheel race at Mid-Ohio saw the SCCA Continental Championship, contested with Formula A machines. George Follmer took the lead at the start and led all 42 laps. Follmer, driving the only Ford in the field, beat second place John Cannon by nearly one minute. Mark Donohue, who crashed his car in practice on Friday, charged from last place to 3rd at the finish.
- 1971: The event, part of the 1971 SCCA L&M Continental 5000 Championship, was run in two 30-lap heats on Monday, the day after Independence Day. In the first heat, Sam Posey started on the pole position and led the first 28 laps. David Hobbs passed Posey on lap 29 and held on to win the first heat by 0.2 seconds. In the second heat, Posey dominated, leading 28 laps. He beat Hobbs to the finish by 18 seconds, and by virtue of the larger margin of victory, was declared the overall winner. Hobbs was caught up in a battle for second with Eppie Wietzes. Hobbs made the pass for second place with two laps to go, but was too far behind to catch Posey for the win.
- 1973: Jody Scheckter held off Brian Redman to win the 100-mile Formula 5000 L&M Championship race. Scheckter pulled out to a 29-second advantage at one point, but his lead shrunk after rain showers entered the area. He found himself stuck behind several slow backmarker cars, and Redman charged to close the gap. Suffering from brake problems, and a brief miscommunication with his crew, Scheckter was even seen shaking his first angrily at the lapped cars blocking him. Redman and Schekter touched wheels when Redman tried to take the lead, but he put two wheels off the track, and Scheckter held the position. At the checkered flag, Scheckter won by 0.791 seconds over Redman, with Mark Donohue coming home third.
- 1974: Brian Redman and Mario Andretti were locked in an exciting, wheel-to-wheel duel for the first 23 laps. Andretti held off the challenge until his Lola T332 started developing a vibration. Redman took the lead on lap 24, and drove to victory in the 42-lap, 100 mile event. Andretti's ultimately car suffered a suspension problem, and lost an exhaust header. Brent Lunger finished second, 45 seconds behind Redman. David Hobbs charged from the 11th row on the starting grid, ran as high as third, and came home fourth.
- 1975: Brian Redman won the 42-lap, 100-mile, Buckeye Cup Formula 5000 race, his second consecutive victory in the event. Redman took the lead on lap 31 after Mario Andretti's car broke down. Redman won by 27.22 seconds over Al Unser. The race was marred by a first lap crash involving B.J. Swanson. At the start, going into turn one, Swanson suffered a stuck throttle, and crashed head-on into a guardrail and bridge. Swanson died from head injuries three days later.
- 1976: Brian Redman made it three in row at Mid-Ohio, winning the 42-lap, 100-mile, Buckeye Cup Formula 5000 race in dominating fashion. Redman started on the pole and at the start, beat Al Unser into turn one. Redman led all 42 laps, stretching out to a 28-second margin of victory. Unser ran second until he spun off the track on lap 31. Jackie Oliver moved into second, while Unser recovered to finish 5th.

=== CART PPG Indy Car World Series ===
- 1980: The Indy cars visited Mid-Ohio for the first time in 1980, under the USAC/CART CRL banner. Brothers Al and Bobby Unser started on the front row, but both would drop out early with mechanical problems. A rather disjointed start saw the ragged field come out of the carousel and be met with a yellow flag at the starter's stand. The field checked up, and Al Unser went spinning into the grass in turn one. It took a few laps to reassemble the field, and the race finally was started. Rick Mears took the lead for the first time on lap 13, with Johnny Rutherford close behind in second. The two cars battled for the lead over many laps, with Mears holding off Rutherford's challenges. Late in the race, Rutherford made his final pit stop, leaving Mears in the lead by about 20 seconds. Mears, however, was suffering from the heat, which caused him to spin out in turn 12. Mears lost a lap, handing the lead to Rutherford in the Chaparral 2K. Moments later, Mears tangled with the spinning car of Rick Muther, and he was out of the race. Johnny Rutherford cruised to victory over the final 19 laps, beating Gordon Johncock by 23.07 seconds. Only seven cars were running at the finish.
- 1983: The Indy cars returned to Mid-Ohio for the second time, as part of the CART PPG Indy Car World Series. Polesitter and hometown favorite Bobby Rahal led the first 18 laps, but was forced to pit with a fuel pickup problem. Teo Fabi assumed the lead on lap 27, and never relinquished it. Contenders John Paul Jr. and Al Unser Jr. both fell by the wayside, while second place Mario Andretti was never able to mount a strong challenge on Fabi. Fabi stretched out to a 45-second lead at one point, and made his final pit stop without losing the lead. Fabi won by 25 seconds over Andretti. Despite two unscheduled pit stops, Bobby Rahal still managed to come home in third.
- 1984: The race was moved to Labor Day weekend beginning in 1984. On a hot, 90° day, Mario Andretti dominated the race, leading 76 of the 84 laps. He lapped all but second place Bobby Rahal, who finished 37.9 seconds behind. The hot conditions took a toll on the field, with numerous drivers, including Andretti, complaining of exhaustion and heat-related fatigue. No driver was able to mount any sort of challenge for the win, and Andretti only relinquished the lead during pit stops. Rahal gave up the chase with about 14 laps to go, and third place Danny Sullivan was more than a lap down, allowing Andretti to cruise to victory.

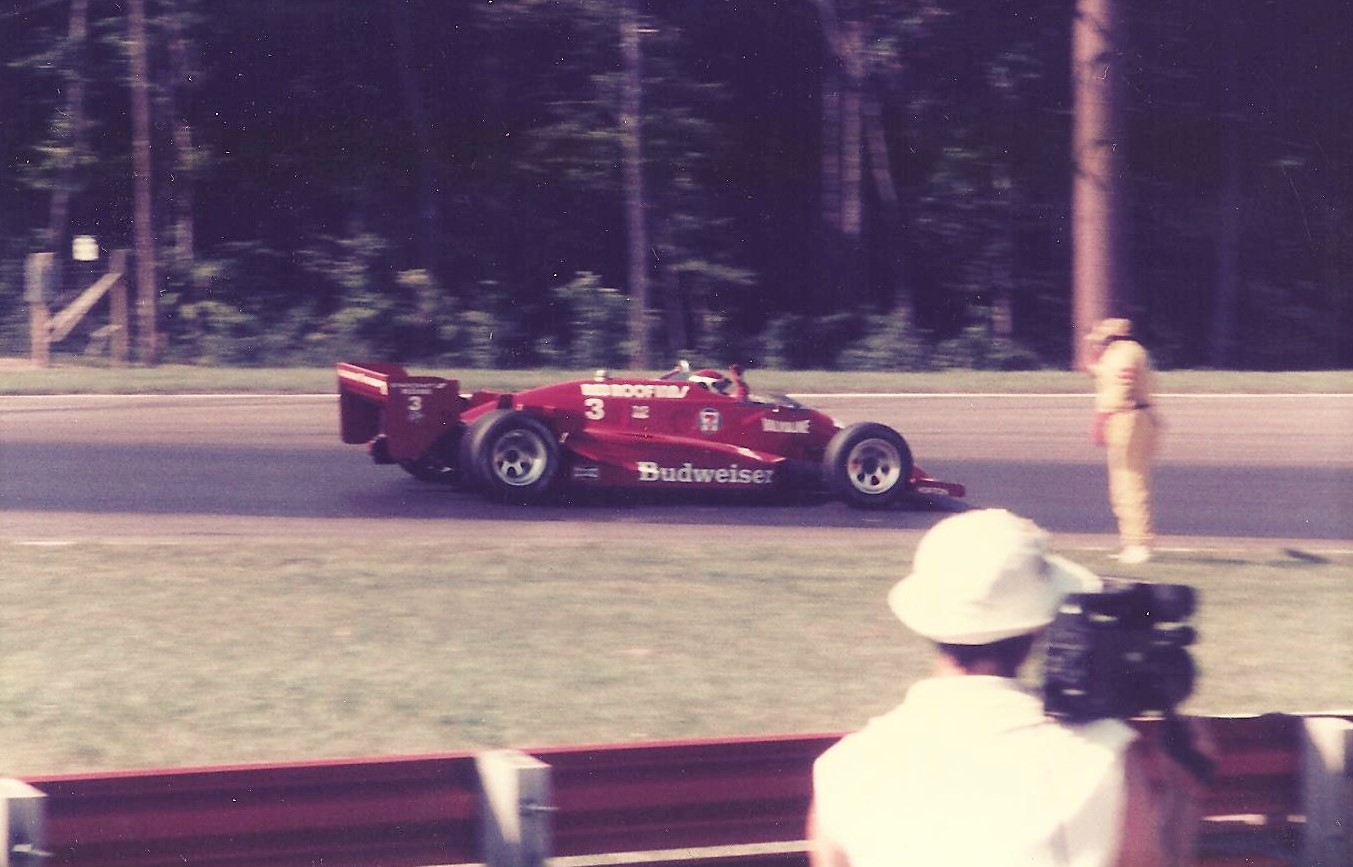
Bobby Rahal celebrates victory in the 1985 race.

- 1985: Hometown favorite Bobby Rahal won the pole position with a new track record (114.791 mph), and led 83 of the 84 laps, en route to a dominating victory. It was Rahal's first Indy car win at Mid-Ohio, in his third attempt. Mario Andretti was running second with just over one lap to go when he blew a tire down the backstretch and skidded to a halt in the grass. Andretti dropped to seventh at the finish, while Danny Sullivan came home in second place.
- 1986: Bobby Rahal was victorious again, winning one of the more exciting races thus far at Mid-Ohio. Mario Andretti started from the pole position and led the first 12 laps until he dropped out with exhaust problems. Danny Sullivan led 60 of the next 61 laps, with Rahal close behind. The two cars battled for the lead most of the day, with Sullivan able to hold off Rahal. Coming out of the keyhole with nine laps to go, Sullivan's car shockingly began to sputter and Rahal blew by to take the lead on the backstretch. Sullivan pitted for fuel, and wound up third. Rahal now held a seven-second lead over Roberto Guerrero, but it quickly evaporated when Rahal became mired in traffic. Guerrero was right on the back bumper of Rahal with six laps to go at the start/finish line. But as the leaders exited turn one, Josele Garza touched wheels with Randy Lewis just behind them. Garza's car flipped into the guardrail, catapulted into the crossover bridge, and tumbled back onto the track near turn one. Garza suffered a broken leg, but was not critically injured in the horrendous crash. The race finished under caution, with Rahal becoming the first back-to-back winner at Mid-Ohio.
- 1987: Bobby Rahal was looking to win his third-consecutive Indy car race at Mid-Ohio - and fifth race overall (he had won in IROC and IMSA) - but with 11 laps to go, a collision took away the chance for victory. Rahal led 66 laps, and was ahead by half a lap when he was working through traffic on lap 74. Rahal tangled with the lapped car of Rick Miaskiewicz, forcing him to pit with a punctured tire. Roberto Guerrero blew by the limping car of Rahal to take the lead, and pulled away for the victory. Rahal climbed back up to second, and avoided a major blow when Michael Andretti - his closest competitor in the points championship - blew his engine in the closing laps. Four days later, Guerrero would be injured during a tire test at Indianapolis. He was struck in the head by a tire, leaving him in a coma, and sidelined for the remainder of the season.
- 1988: The race started in rain, with Danny Sullivan on the pole. On lap 3, Michael Andretti tapped Sullivan at the end of the backstretch, sending the two cars, along with Al Unser Jr., spinning into the grass. Andretti dropped out, but Unser and Sullivan were able to continue. Emerson Fittipaldi started 7th, but was quickly up the lead by lap 7. Fittipaldi led 62 laps, stretching out to a 31-second margin at one point. After the final sequence of pit stops, Fittipaldi took the lead for good on lap 70, and won his first race at Mid-Ohio.
- 1989: Teo Fabi started from the pole position and won the race, the first and only victory for the Porsche Indy Car program. Fabi took the lead at the start, and led 45 of the first 47 laps, with Al Unser Jr. in pursuit. Unser caught and passed Fabi for the lead on lap 48. After the second round of pit stops, Fabi was back in the lead pulling out to a sizable margin. Fabi's crew, however, had not been able to fill the car with fuel on the second stop, and Fabi would be forced to make a third splash-and-go pit stop to make it to the finish. With the light fuel load, Fabi pulled out to a 21-second advantage, allowing him to pit for fuel with nine laps to go and still hold the lead. Fabi became the second two-time winner at Mid-Ohio, and this would be the final Indy car race held on the original 2.4-mile layout.
- 1990: During the offseason, a new straightaway segment was paved to bypass the chicane (turns 2–3), and the track layout now measured 2.25 miles. Heavy rain in the morning made for a damp track at the start. Michael Andretti led the first 45 laps. During his first scheduled pit stop, Andretti's crew insisted he stay on wet tires, while his father Mario Andretti switched to slicks. Two laps later, Michael Andretti slid off-course in the keyhole, allowing Mario to take the lead. Michael dropped to third, with Eddie Cheever now up to second. On lap 57, Michael tried to pass Cheever for second at the end of the backstretch, but lost control and clipped Cheever's tire. Cheever's tire was punctured, and Michael's front wing was damaged. Moments later, a downpour put the race under caution, and the entire field pitted for wets. When the green came out, Michael quickly reeled in his father Mario, and took the lead for good on lap 71. Michael Andretti led the rest of the way and cruised to victory, with Mario finishing second.
- 1991: Michael Andretti dominated the race, leading 88 of the 89 laps, and held on for a crucial victory, his second-consecutive win at Mid-Ohio. Andretti started from the pole and led most of the day with ease, giving up the lead only during a pit stop. But late in the race, his tires started to go away. On lap 66, Emerson Fittipaldi passed Bobby Rahal for second place and began charging to catch Andretti. Fittipaldi closed to within one second with five laps to go. Andretti and Fittipaldi encountered lapped traffic on lap 86, and Andretti was able to get by cleanly. Fittipaldi, however, got caught behind the slower cars and could not get by. Andretti held on to win the race, taking the points lead as a result. It was a critical win that helped Andretti on the way to winning the 1991 CART championship.

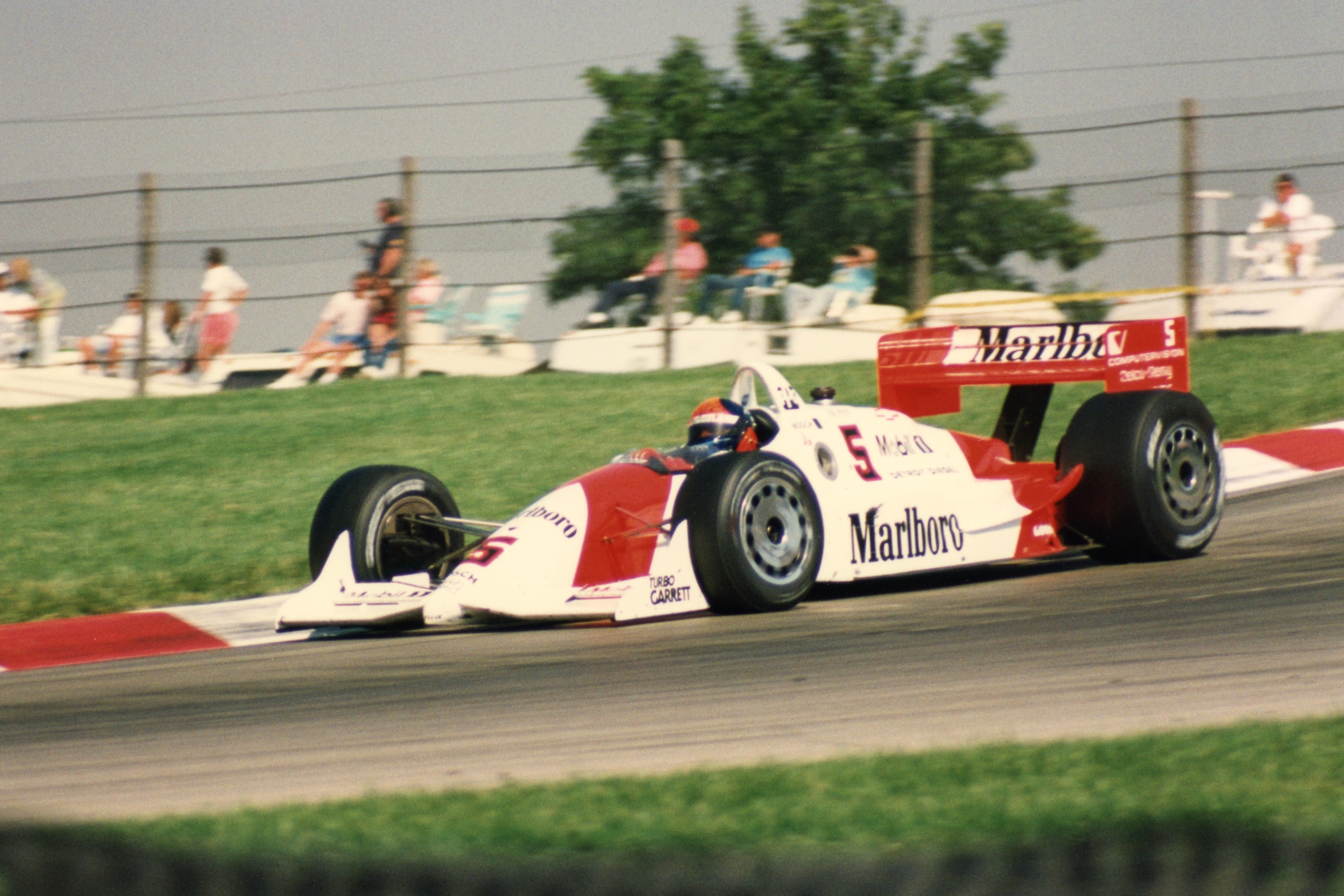
Emerson Fittipaldi navigates the Keyhole section of the course in a Penske Racing IndyCar in 1992

- 1992: Michael Andretti led 50 of the first 51 laps, ahead of Penske teammates Emerson Fittipaldi and Paul Tracy, who were in close pursuit. Andretti, going for three in a row at Mid-Ohio, however, dropped out with low oil pressure. Fittipaldi took over the lead and won the race, with Tracy coming home second. Hometown favorite Bobby Rahal, two-time Mid-Ohio winner, and the series points leader going into the race, had an embarrassing crash in turn one on the third lap. Battling poor handling, he hit the concrete curbing, lost control, and spun into the barrier.
- 1993: Series points leader Nigel Mansell started from the pole position. At the start, Paul Tracy from the outside of the front row, clipped Mansell's car, breaking the front wing, and forcing Mansell to the pits for repairs. Tracy took the lead, and pulled out to a 21-second advantage. On lap 21, however, he locked up the brakes attempting to lap the car of Scott Pruett, and slid off the track head-on into a tire barrier. Later in the race, Emerson Fittipaldi battled with Scott Goodyear and Al Unser Jr. for the race lead. On lap 31, Unser tried to pass Fittipaldi for the lead in the esses, but ran out of room and slid off into the grass. Unser veered back onto the pavement, clipping Goodyear in the right rear. Unser's nosecone broke off, sending him to the pits and out of contention for the win. Fittipaldi became the third driver to win at Mid-Ohio in consecutive seasons, and the second in a row to do so. Nigel Mansell charged from two laps down to come home 12th.
- 1994: Beginning in 1994, the race was moved to mid-August. On lap 53, Paul Tracy was leading, just ahead of Al Unser Jr., when Teo Fabi spun out in the Keyhole. A local yellow was put out as a safety truck was dispatched to tow Fabi out of the sandtrap. Tracy came upon the car of Robby Gordon coming out of turn one. In the keyhole, Gordon went too hot into the corner, and the back end nearly came around. The car slid high out of the groove, and he avoided contact with the safety truck. Tracy locked up the brakes, and ducked underneath Gordon to get by. Moments later, CART officials put out the black flag and issued Tracy a stop-and-go penalty for passing under the yellow. The penalty cost Tracy the lead. Despite the controversial penalty, Penske teammates Unser, Tracy, and Emerson Fittipaldi swept the podium, finishing 1-2-3.
- 1995: After an up-and-down day, Al Unser Jr. was victorious, becoming the third driver in a row to win back-to-back races at Mid-Ohio (and fourth overall). During the pace lap, Unser was forced to pit with a punctured tire. He pitted out of sequence with the leaders, which necessitated a late-race pit stop for a splash of fuel. Unser inherited the lead after Michael Andretti blew an engine with four laps to go.
- 1996: Ganassi teammates Alex Zanardi and Jimmy Vasser finished 1st-2nd, with Zanardi leading 79 of the 83 laps. Zanardi held a comfortable lead most of the race, but two late yellows bunched the field for Vasser. Zanardi was able to withstand the two late restarts. Two crashes on the final lap took out four cars. Greg Moore made contact with André Ribeiro in the keyhole, while Al Unser Jr. tangled with Parker Johnstone at the end of the backstretch. Unser, who entered the race second in points, was running 10th, but fell out of the points.
- 1997: Alex Zanardi became the fourth driver in a row to win consecutive races at Mid-Ohio, and the fifth overall. Zanardi took the lead for the first time on lap 19 after polesitter Bryan Herta blew a tire. Zanardi pulled out to a large lead over Greg Moore. Late in the race, the Ganassi team determined that Zanardi was one lap short of making the distance on fuel. The team encouraged Zanardi to speed up and put some distance between himself and second place. On lap 70, he had pulled out to a 30-second lead when a yellow came out. He ducked into the pits for a splash-and-go stop for fuel, and came out still holding the lead. Zanardi cruised to the win, and Moore finished second 4.8 seconds behind. Bobby Rahal charged from 16th starting position to finish third.

=== CART FedEx Championship Series ===
- 1998: Much of the attention for the day focused on Bobby Rahal, who was making his final start at Mid-Ohio before his retirement at the end of the season. Rahal would finish a strong third. In a race full of crashes, Adrián Fernández led the final 26 laps, holding off teammate Scott Pruett for the victory. A crash on the first lap took out Bryan Herta, Dario Franchitti, and Jimmy Vasser. Greg Moore, who led 23 laps, dropped out after contact in the pits damaged his suspension. The most serious crash of the day occurred on lap 58. P. J. Jones ran over a piece of debris from JJ Lehto's car, locking up his steering at the end of the backstretch. Michael Andretti and Mark Blundell came upon the scene, and Andretti, attempting to pass, touched wheels with Jones. Andretti's car was sent barrel-rolling off the end of the backstretch at 190 mph, landing upright in a sand trap. Later in the race, Alex Zanardi was fined $50,000 for contact with Hélio Castroneves.
- 1999: Juan Pablo Montoya started 8th, and after a fast pit stop on lap 30, came out in third place. Trailing race leader Dario Franchitti by 17 seconds, Montoya began charging and over the next twenty laps, closed to within two seconds of the lead. Franchitti made his second pit stop a few laps early due to a punctured tire, handing the lead to Paul Tracy. The lead was short-lived, as Montoya passed Tracy one lap later. On a restart with 18 laps to go, Montoya was able to get a jump, and set a stunning pace over the final stint. Montoya cruised to victory by a margin of 10.9 seconds over Tracy. Franchitti came home third.
- 2000: Penske Racing teammates Hélio Castroneves and Gil de Ferran dominated the weekend. The duo swept the front row in qualifying, and led all 83 laps en route to a 1-2 finish. At the start, de Ferran took the lead from the pole position, and led the first 28 laps. He made his first pit stop on lap 29, handing the lead to Castroneves. One lap later, Castroneves pitted, and with a faster stop came out ahead of de Ferran. Castroneves led the final 55 laps to win.
- 2001: For the second consecutive year, Hélio Castroneves and Gil de Ferran finished 1-2 for Penske. In a near-repeat of the 2000 race, de Ferran started from the pole position, and led until the first round of pit stops. On lap 29, de Ferran pitted, but was mired in traffic after he exited the pit area. Castroneves pitted one lap later, and with a clear track maintained the lead after his stop. Moments later, Rahal teammates Kenny Bräck and Max Papis tangled in the Esses dropping both from contention. Early contenders Jimmy Vasser and Dario Franchitti both dropped out, while Michael Andretti blew his engine back on lap 6. Castroneves led 44 of the final 55 laps to win, and became the sixth different driver to win at Mid-Ohio in consecutive seasons.
- 2002: Patrick Carpentier started from the pole position and led 89 of the 92 laps on his way to victory. Cristiano da Matta was in close pursuit of Carpentier much of the race, and closed to within a car length on lap 70. Going down the backstretch, da Matta tucked in behind, and ducked low looking to make a pass for the lead going into turn 5. Carpentier turned in, and da Matta's car got caught in dirty air, locked the rear brakes, and spun into the gravel trap.
- 2003: The final CART series race at Mid-Ohio was won by Paul Tracy. Tracy won an Indy/Champ car race at Mid-Ohio for the first time in eleven tries, and it was his first win on the course since an Indy Lights victory in 1990. Tracy led 69 of the 92 laps, and finished 0.51 seconds ahead of second place Patrick Carpentier.

=== Indy Racing League / IndyCar Series ===
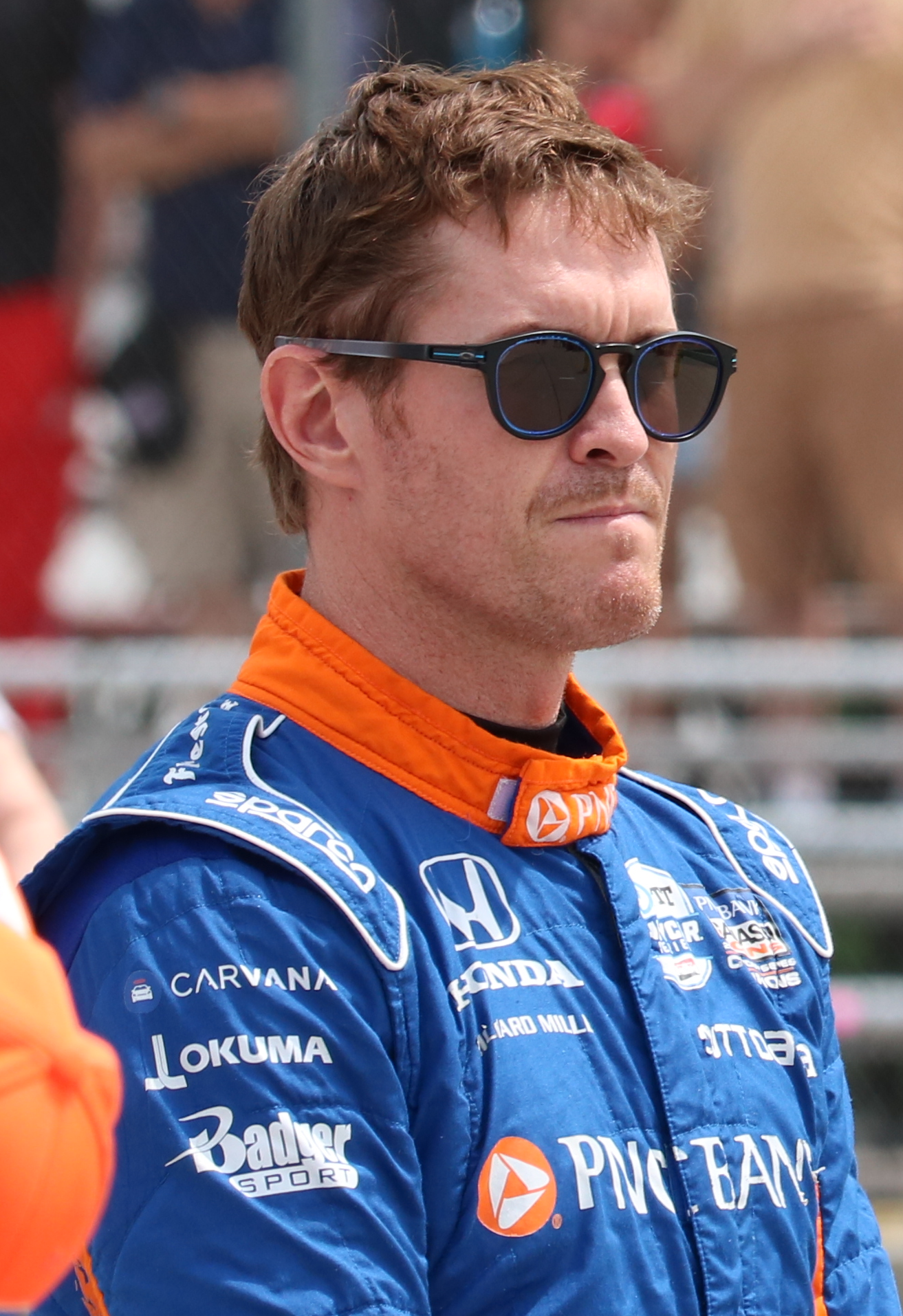
Scott Dixon has won a record seven times at Mid-Ohio.

- 2007: Indy car racing made a popular return to Mid-Ohio after a three-year absence. Helio Castroneves won the pole position, hs sixth pole of the year, tying Billy Boat's record for most poles in a season, set in 1998. On the first lap, Andretti Green teammates Danica Patrick, Tony Kanaan, and Marco Andretti tangled, resulting in Andretti's car flipping over Kanaan's rear tire and landing upside-down. Andretti was uninjured. On the final fuel stop, Scott Dixon's Chip Ganassi Racing crew was able to short-fill and get him out ahead of rivals Dario Franchitti and Castroneves. Dixon won by 2.6917 seconds, his first of multiple wins at Mid-Ohio.
- 2008: A pre-race rain shower prompted teams to start the race on rain tires. But once the race started, the track began to dry quickly, and teams were faced with a decision as to when to switch to slicks. Ryan Briscoe started second, but quickly dropped to sixth. He was among the last of the leaders to pit for slicks (on lap 7), and lost considerable track position in doing so, falling as low as 17th. Pitting off-sequence for the rest of the race, however, allowed Briscoe to move to the front owing to two fortuitous caution periods. Briscoe was able to run full throttle to the finish, while others were running fuel conservation strategies.
- 2009: Scott Dixon earns his 20th Indy Racing League IndyCar Series victory, making him the most successful driver in series history.
- 2010: A full-course caution came out for a spin by Francesco Dracone, setting up a restart with 13 laps to go. Dario Franchitti led Will Power and Helio Castroneves. With two laps to go, Power was right on the tail of Franchitti. The two cars were nose-to-tail on the final lap, with Franchitti holding off Power by 0.5234 seconds.
- 2011: Scott Dixon edged teammate Dario Franchitti down the backstretch on a restart on lap 61, and held on to win at Mid-Ohio for the third time in five seasons. Will Power dropped to 14th after getting caught out under a full-course caution during a sequence of pit stops.
- 2012: Will Power won the pole position, followed by Dario Franchitti, Simon Pagenaud and Scott Dixon. Dixon picks up his second win of the season, leading the final 16 laps, and fourth win overall at Mid-Ohio. Power, who led the first 57 laps, came home second.
- 2013: Charlie Kimball led a race-high 46 laps, and earned his first victory in Indy car competition. In a race that went caution-free, Kimball set an all-time Mid-Ohio record with an average speed of 117.825 mph. Kimball took the lead for good on lap 73 of 90, and won even after crashing his primary car earlier in the weekend. Some drivers in the field were attempting to execute a two-stop strategy, but in doing so, fuel-saving measures were needed. Kimball's team elected a three-stop run, which allowed a much faster pace, and he pulled away to a commanding victory.
- 2014: Scott Dixon won at Mid-Ohio for the fifth time in eight seasons. Polesitter Sébastien Bourdais led the early stages of the race, and Dixon, who started last after spinning out during qualifying, worked his way to the front off-sequence in pit stops from the other leaders. Dixon capitalized on an error by Josef Newgarden during his final pit stop. Newgarden ran over an air hose, tripping a crew member, and was penalized for hitting pit equipment. Series points leader Hélio Castroneves suffered throttle problems on the grid, and joined the race four laps down, and finished a lowly 19th.
- 2015: Hometown favorite Graham Rahal won the race, thirty years after his father Bobby Rahal won at Mid-Ohio. On lap 66, Rahal made his final pit stop, just as the yellow came out for a controversial spin by Sage Karam at the end of the backstretch. Rahal led the rest of the way, holding off Justin Wilson on a restart with 6 laps to go. It was Wilson's final career podium finish. Wilson would be fatally injured at the next race at Pocono just three weeks later.
- 2016: Simon Pagenaud started from the pole position, and took the lead at the start, with Will Power and Josef Newgarden running 2nd-3rd. Several teams attempted alternate pit strategies in the first half of the race, shuffling the standings often. After a restart on lap 19, Power clipped the rear bumper pod on Newgarden's car, forcing Newgarden to pit for a rear wing assembly change. Later, Mikhail Aleshin emerged as the leader, and began to pull away to a sizable margin. On lap 61, the second caution of the race occurred when Jack Hawksworth went wide on entry to turn one, causing him to lose control and hit the wall. All of the leaders headed to the pits for their final stops. Race leader Aleshin was released directly into the path of Newgarden, causing the two to make contact and ending Aleshin's day. Conor Daly elected to stay out, and took over the lead, while Will Power emerged in second, and Pagenaud third. Daly would be unable to make it to the finish on fuel, meaning the battle for the lead would ultimately be between Power and Pagenaud. On lap 66, Pagenaud began to put heavy pressure on Power and in turn 12 was able to get by. This would prove to be the winning move of the race, as Pagenaud would take the lead on lap 84 and win by 4.1620 seconds.
- 2017: Josef Newgarden was leading the race by 12 seconds when the final sequence of pit stops began on lap 62. Newgaren emerged as the leader, but on lap 67 the first and only caution of the race came out when Ed Jones spun in turn 9. On the restart on lap 71, the lapped car of Esteban Gutiérrez was wedged between Newgarden and second place Will Power. This allowed Newgarden to easily pull away score his third win of the season.
- 2018: Alexander Rossi started from the pole and led 66 of the 90 laps to victory. Rossi's team gambled by executing a two pit stop strategy, while all of the other leaders made three pit stops. Rossi was able to make mileage in his first stint, and made his second and final pit stop on lap 59. Robert Wickens pitted on lap 65, handing the lead to Rossi, who stretched out to a 12.8285 second margin at the finish.
- 2019: Scott Dixon won his record sixth Mid-Ohio Indy car race, but not before one of the best last-lap battles in Mid-Ohio history. The race went caution-free, and the leaders cycled through their final pit stops by lap 66. Scott Dixon held a commanding 9-second lead over teammate Felix Rosenqvist. Ryan Hunter-Reay was running third, an additional 11 seconds back. Rosenqvist steadily began trimming the deficit, as was Hunter-Reay, and it was becoming evident that Dixon's tires were starting to go away. Dixon was on the alternate red tires, while Rosenqvist and Hunter-Reay were on the primary blacks. With Dixon backing off, nursing his car to the finish, Rosenqvist was charging, and worked his way past the lapped cars between himself and Dixon. On the final lap, Rosenqvist made a move for the lead in the Keyhole, but clipped the inside curb and Dixon maintained the position. At the finish line, Dixon held off Rosenqvist by 0.0934 seconds, the closest finish in Mid-Ohio history, and third-closest road course finish in Indy car history.

2020

- 2020 (Saturday): The first race of the 2020 doubleheader weekend was held on Saturday September 12. The race was shortened from its normal 90-lap distance to 75 laps. Will Power won the pole position, his milestone 60th career pole. Power took the lead at the start and led 66 laps, en route to a dominating victory. With the shorter distance, the pit strategy was altered slightly, as every car would be able to make it to the finish with only two stops. Power employed an all-out, fast-paced strategy, and did not worry about fuel-saving measures. In a race that went without a caution, Power's hard-charging effort put him out in front after both rounds of pit stops. Power won by 7.4523 seconds over Penske teammate Josef Newgarden, with storm clouds approaching over the final few laps. Alexander Rossi came home third, executing first an "overcut", and later an "undercut" strategy, which helped move him gain two positions. Points leader Scott Dixon started way down in 17th, and finished only 10th.
- 2020 (Sunday): The second race of the 2020 doubleheader weekend was held Sunday September 13. Colton Herta won the race, leading a 1st-2nd-3rd sweep of the podium by Andretti Autosport. Herta started from the pole position and led 57 laps, but was not without incident. At the start, Herta and Santino Ferrucci started on the front row. Going side by side into turn 4, Herta did not give much room on the outside, forcing Ferrucci into the grass. Ferrucci's car came back onto the track and collided with his Dale Coyne Racing teammate Álex Palou and Felix Rosenqvist. Both Palou and Rosenqvist were eliminated, while Ferrucci was penalized for avoidable contact. Later in the race, Dalton Kellett, Scott Dixon, and Marco Andretti each went off-course in turn one in separate incidents. All were able to continue, but Dixon for the second day in a row, managed only a 10th-place finish. After the final round of pit stops, Herta held off Alexander Rossi by 1.3826 second, with Ryan Hunter-Reay close behind in third.
- 2021: The race was scheduled for 80 laps for 2021. In addition, it was moved to July 4 weekend. Josef Newgarden took his third consecutive pole position ahead of Colton Herta, Alex Palou, and Scott Dixon. Newgarden dominated the race leading 73 of the 80 laps. Newgarden made his final pit stop on lap 53, and emerged with about a 6-7 second lead over Marcus Ericsson. In the closing laps, however, Ericsson started using push-to-pass, while Newgarden encountered slower traffic. The lead shrunk to less than 2 seconds with two laps to go. On the final lap, the two cars were nose-tail, but Newgarden held off Ericsson by 0.879 seconds. It was the first race win of the season for Penske Racing, and came on the 50th anniversary of Penske's first Indy car win. Álex Palou rounded out the podium.
- 2022: Pato O'Ward qualified for the pole position. O'Ward and Scott McLaughlin traded the lead during the first half until O'Ward's car started losing power. On lap 54, the car finally quit exiting the pits, and his day was finished. McLaughlin took the lead for the first time on lap 31, and led 45 of the final 52 laps. McLaughlin held off Álex Palou and Will Power - who charged from 21st starting position (and a half-spin on the opening lap), to finish third. The story of the race, however, was an uncharacteristic six yellows for multiple spins and contact. On lap 59, teammates Romain Grosjean and Alexander Rossi tangled going side-by-side in the keyhole, drawing the ire of the team. In total, three avoidable contact penalties were handed out during the race. Colton Herta experienced bad luck on two occasions. On lap 54, his crew neglected to call him in for a pit stop as a caution was about to come out. Seconds later, he wound up trapped out on the track, the only car not having pit yet. Then with 17 laps to go, he too tangled with Grosjean, going briefly off-course in the keyhole.
- 2023: Alex Palou, the winner at Detroit and Road America, made it three victories in a row by winning at Mid-Ohio. Colton Herta and Graham Rahal started 1st-2nd, respectively, and the led the early segment of the race. On their first pit stops, Herta and Rahal both took on primary "black" tires, while Palou took on alternate "reds". Palou charged into the lead, and pulled out to an 8-second advantage. On the second and final sequence of pit stops, both Herta and Rahal experienced trouble. Herta broke the pit road speed limit while exiting, then Rahal's crew had difficulty with the left rear tire. That left Palou with a comfortable lead, and he cruised to victory. Marcus Ericsson, who entered the race second in the points standings, crashed on the opening lap. He ran over teammate Felix Rosenqvist, and finished last. Ericsson slipped to fourth in the season standings, while Palou stretched his championship lead to a staggering 110 points. During practice on Saturday, Simon Pagenaud suffered a spectacular barrel-roll crash at the end of the backstretch. He suffered a concussion and sat out the race, and ultimately the remainder of the 2023 season, as well as the 2024 season with lingering brain injuries.
- 2024: The 2024 event was a milestone race for the IndyCar Series, as it was the first Indy car race to feature the new supercapacitor based hybrid ERS system. Alex Palou qualified for the pole position. On the pace lap Scott Dixon's car suffered a powertrain failure, though he managed to get back into the race. When the race started, Palou - on primary black tires - took a quick lead and jumped out ahead of Pato O'Ward for the majority of the race. During the final round of pit stops, O'Ward came in first on lap 54 (of 80), executing an undercut strategy. One lap later, Palou came in, but his car hesitated while exiting the pits. O'Ward passed Palou for the lead, as he managed a faster out-lap on than Palou's in-lap. Over the final 24 laps, O'Ward and Palou were essentially nose-to-tail. O'Ward held onto the lead through lapped traffic from Kyffin Simpson and Agustin Canapino, with Palou pushing hard and making multiple mistakes to try to get past O'Ward. With two laps to go, Romain Grosjean spun but managed to get back onto the track, which stacked up the lapped traffic. O'Ward pulled away in the final lap for his earned win in a year and a half. Palou finished second while Scott McLaughlin rounded out the podium in third.
- 2025: Scott Dixon won for the seventh time at Mid-Ohio, in improbable fashion. Points leader Alex Palou started on the pole position, and executed the three pit stop strategy. Dixon started ninth, and his crew elected to execute a fuel-saving, two-stop strategy instead. Palou led 75 of the first 84 laps (of 90). The race was expected to come down to the final round of pits stops, and who would come out ahead. Dixon made his final stop on lap 61. Palou pushed hard, trying to built up a big gap before he came in on lap 72. Palou emerged with the lead, with Dixon second. Palou pulled out to a 1.8-second lead, and appeared to be cruising to his 7th race victory of the season. With five laps to go, however, Palou bobbled and went off track and into the dirt in turn 9. Dixon slipped by to take the lead. Palou charged over the final four laps, but came up short. Dixon held him off by 0.4201 seconds.
- 2026: Pato O'Ward won for the second time at Mid-Ohio, over teammate Christian Lundgaard in an Arrow McLaren 1–2 since qualifying. O'Ward passed Lundgarrd on Lap 42 (of 90) and held off the others by 1.0858 seconds.

== See also ==
- Sports Car Challenge at Mid-Ohio

Preceded by Grand Prix of Road America	IndyCar Series; Indy 200 at Mid-Ohio	Succeeded by Music City Grand Prix
