= 1997 U.S. F2000 National Championship =

Car racing competition

The 1997 U.S. F2000 National Championship was won by Zak Morioka.

== Race calendar and results ==
Round	Circuit	Location	Date	Pole position	Fastest lap	Winner
1	Walt Disney World Speedway	(United States) Bay Lake, Florida	January 24	(United States) Buddy Rice	(Australia) David Besnard	(Brazil) Urubatan Helou, Jr.
2	Grand Prix of St. Petersburg	(United States) St. Petersburg, Florida	February 23	(United States) Matt Sielsky	(United States) Matt Sielsky	(Italy) Rino Mastronardi
3	Phoenix International Raceway	(United States) Avondale, Arizona	March 23	(United States) Matt Sielsky	(United States) Duncan Dayton	(United States) Buddy Rice
4	Phoenix International Raceway	(United States) Avondale, Arizona	April 19	(United States) Buddy Rice	(United States) Duncan Dayton	(United States) Duncan Dayton
5	Phoenix International Raceway	(United States) Avondale, Arizona	April 20	(United States) Duncan Dayton	(United States) Buddy Rice	(United States) Jeff Shafer
6	Grand Prize of America Road Course	(United States) Savannah, Georgia	May 18	(United States) Jeff Shafer	(Brazil) Luciano Zangirolami	(Brazil) Luciano Zangirolami
7	Pikes Peak International Raceway	(United States) Fountain, Colorado	June 29	(United States) Matt Sielsky	(United States) Robby McGehee	(Brazil) Zak Morioka
8	Charlotte Motor Speedway	(United States) Concord, North Carolina	July 25	(Italy) Andrea de Lorenzi	(Italy) Andrea de Lorenzi	(United States) Ryan Hampton
9	Charlotte Motor Speedway	(United States) Concord, North Carolina	July 26	(Italy) Andrea de Lorenzi	(United States) Matt Sielsky	(Italy) Andrea de Lorenzi
10	Mid-Ohio Sports Car Course	(United States) Lexington, Ohio	August 9	(United States) Matt Sielsky	(Brazil) Zak Morioka	(Brazil) Zak Morioka
11	Watkins Glen International	(United States) Watkins Glen, New York	August 23	(Brazil) Zak Morioka	(Canada) David Rutledge	(Italy) Andrea de Lorenzi
12	Watkins Glen International	(United States) Watkins Glen, New York	August 24	(Brazil) Zak Morioka	(Italy) Andrea de Lorenzi	(Italy) Andrea de Lorenzi

== Drivers' Championship ==
Color	Result
Gold	Winner
Silver	2nd place
Bronze	3rd place
Green	4th & 5th place
Light Blue	6th–10th place
Dark Blue	11th place or lower
Purple	Did not finish
Red	Did not qualify (DNQ)
Brown	Withdrawn (Wth)
Black	Disqualified (DSQ)
White	Did not start (DNS)
Blank	Did not participate (DNP)
Blank	Driver replacement (Rpl)
Blank	Injured (Inj)
Blank	No race held (NH)

Pos	Driver	WDW	STP	PHO	PIR		SAV	PPR	CHA		MOH	WGI		Points
1	(Brazil) Zak Morioka	7	8	3	29	17	2	1	3	DNS	1	4	4	205
2	(United States) Matt Sielsky	12	2	25	23	4	8	10	2	26	2	3	5	177
3	(United States) Duncan Dayton	4	12	2	1	5	36	29	20	9	5	17	3	162
4	(United States) Buddy Rice	2	3	1	18	26	3	2	37	33	13	11	37	153
5	(United States) Andy Lally	24	5	10	9	10	5	4	10	6	6	7	34	147
6	(United States) Ryan Hampton			15	5	3	10	16	1	2	9	34	28	133
7	(United States) Robby McGehee	3	29	4	32	11	32	7	4	10	44	6	8	129
8	(United States) J. Michael Johnson		11	14	4	6	31	12	8	8	8	9	7	127
9	(Brazil) Luciano Zangirolami	8	30	6	8	8	1	9	17	12	21			112
10	(United States) Seth Taylor	16	32	16	13	7	7	13	5	28	10	26	2	110
11	(United States) Jeff Horne	11	28	26	3	9	4	3	19	25	23	8	20	106
12	(United States) Jeff Shafer		24	36	27	1	35	18	7	3	4	14	40	102
13	(United States) Augie Pabst III	21	6	17	7	14	13	27	13	7	14	12	10	98
14	(Canada) David Rutledge	4	41	30	10	23	6	6	36	15	42	2	30	97
15	(Brazil) Urubatan Helou, Jr.	1	30	32	2	31	28	5	34	32	12	21	27	89
16	(United States) Tim Duit	14	10	8	31	15	9	19	32	5	18	10	33	84
17	(United States) Ollie Besinger	15	13	13	6	32	33		24	20	7	13	36	64
18	(United States) Ric Rushton	10	15	5	16	20	11					37	19	53
19	(Australia) David Besnard	6	14	35	28	2								51
20	(United States) David Webb		4				19		12	18	16	15	29	46
21	(United States) Owen Trinkler	32	19		33	13	12				15	30	9	40
22	(United States) Sam Hornish Jr.	27	20	24	24	12	11		11		46	31	39	36
23	(United States) Mike Williams		22	29	25	28	30	23	22	13	11	19	15	32
24	(Canada) Tom Wood	23	15	11	15	34	22	22	30	19	39	29	32	30
24	(United States) Greg LeMond	20	39	28	22	21	DNS	17	16	11	40	18	17	30
26	(United States) Don Burgoon	19	9	31	30	Wth			35	31	24	36	14	27
27	(South Africa) Grant Van Schalkwyk		33		Wth	16	29		14	14		24	24	23
28	(Australia) Joey Scarallo			12	11	24								20
29	(United States) Michael Fitzgerald	18	DNS	27							43	20	12	15
30	(United States) Bryan Selby			7										14
31	(United States) Tony Renna	9												12
32	(Brazil) Giuliano Losacco	33	21	21	21	Wth	14	DNS						11
32	(Canada) James Yott		37	33	19	19	20	24			20	40	21	11
34	(United States) Jeff Smith		18	19	20	27			25	22	30			10
35	(United States) Cory Witherill	25	27					32	18	34	25	22	35	9
35	(Canada) Jean-Francois Veilleux	13	25											9
35	(United States) John Miller	30	36	20	26	22	21				27	38	38	9
38	(United States) K.W. Scott III							15						6
39	(United States) John Ross				17	30								5
39	(United States) Scott Dick			22				21	33	23	26			5
41	(United States) Ken Dromm	22	35									32	22	4
41	(United States) Jonathan Newberg		17											4
41	(United States) Bob Lisey						26				32	39	26	4
41	(United States) Jon Groom	34	26									35	31	4
41	(United States) Joe Foster						17							4
46	(Venezuela) Alejandro Garcia	DNQ					24		28	29				3
47	(United States) Jerry Petersen	29					25				29			2
47	(United States) David Bleke								29	35				2
47	(United States) Dana LaLiberte										19			2
50	(United States) John McMurray		34											1
50	(United States) Ed Dasso	31												1
50	(United States) Peter Barron										36			1
	(United States) Jason Bach										35	28	25	
	(United States) Ennis Bragg								26	24				
	(United States) Jim Bryant				12	25								
	(United Kingdom) Jonathan Clues				Wth	29								
	(Italy) Andrea De Lorenzi						34	20	9	1	3	1	1	
	(United States) Mark Dickens										47			
	(United States) Richard Fairbanks										DNS			
	(United States) Nick Fanelli						23							
	(United States) Jerry Foyt							14	15	16				
	(United States) Larry Foyt	36	18	34				28	21	21				
	(United States) Kevin Frisbie		23											
	(United States) John Fujii				14	18								
	(United States) Divina Galica	28												
	(Canada) Rick Hayward						18				48			
	(United States) Jon Herb								31	DNS	41	27	23	
	(United States) Bob Hollander										33	16	13	
	(United States) John Hollansworth Jr.	17		9				25						
	(United States) Nick Lombardi							31						
	(United States) Bob Lutz										28	33	16	
	(Italy) Rino Mastronardi		1											
	(United States) Allen May							8	6	4				
	(United States) Brian McCarthy										38			
	(Brazil) Juiliano Moro		7											
	(United States) Henry Najem		38					33						
	(United States) Bobby Oergel								23	17				
	(United States) Dean Oppermann										34	DNS	DNS	
	(United States) Billy Puterbaugh, Jr.							26						
	(United States) Ken Reinders										DNS			
	(United States) Steve Rikert										17	23	11	
	(United States) George Scheiderer										31			
	(United States) Scott Schubot						16							
	(United States) Jeff Simmons										45	5	6	
	(United States) Lance Spragins			23				30	38	DNS				
	(United States) Joe Tesone										37			
	(United States) Michael Varacins						15							
	(United States) Larry Vatri	35	31						27	30	22			
	(United States) Vince Vilasi	26												
	(United States) Jim Withney				Wth	33								
	(United States) Jason Workman						27							
	(United States) Bob Wright											25	18	
