= 1998 Atlantic Championship =

1998 Toyota Atlantic Championship season
- KOOL Toyota Atlantic Championship

Season
- Races: 12
- Start date: April 4th
- End date: October 4th

Awards
- Drivers' champion: (Canada) Lee Bentham

The 1998 Toyota Atlantic Championship season was contested over 13 rounds. All teams had to use Toyota engines. The KOOL Toyota Atlantic Championship Drivers' Champion was Lee Bentham driving for Forsythe Racing.

== Calendar ==
Race No	Track	State	Date	Laps	Lap Distance (km)	Total Distance (km)	Time	Speed	Winner	Pole position	Most leading laps	Fastest race lap
1	Long Beach	California	April 4, 1998	38	2.533	96.595	0'58:34.554	98.943 km/h	Memo Gidley	Buddy Rice	Memo Gidley	Andrew Bordin
2	Nazareth	Pennsylvania	April 25, 1998	60	1.5223978	91.343868	0'27:27.352	199.616 km/h	Buddy Rice	Buddy Rice	Buddy Rice	Buddy Rice
3	Madison	Illinois	May 22, 1998	27	2.011625	54.313875	0'28:19.198	115.072 km/h	Memo Gidley	Anthony Lazzaro	Anthony Lazzaro	Anthony Lazzaro
4	Milwaukee	Wisconsin	May 30, 1998	60	1.6607976	99.647856	0'32:29.552	184.008 km/h	Memo Gidley	Memo Gidley	Memo Gidley	Derek Hill
5	Montréal	Canada	June 6, 1998	27	4.4207471	119.3601717	0'44:32.839	160.764 km/h	Lee Bentham	Lee Bentham	Alexandre Tagliani	Lee Bentham
6	Cleveland	Ohio	July 11, 1998	22	3.3891858	74.5620876	0'31:54.902	140.176 km/h	Kenny Wilden	Memo Gidley	Memo Gidley	Kenny Wilden
7	Toronto	Canada	July 18, 1998	39	2.7696053	108.0146067	0'59:04.390	109.709 km/h	Alexandre Tagliani	Lee Bentham	Alexandre Tagliani	Lee Bentham
8	Trois-Rivières	Canada	August 2, 1998	45	2.4477453	110.1485385	0'49:23.054	133.826 km/h	Alexandre Tagliani	Alexandre Tagliani	Alexandre Tagliani	Alexandre Tagliani
9	Lexington	Ohio	August 9, 1998	25	3.6337994	90.844985	0'33:03.166	164.909 km/h	Lee Bentham	Alexandre Tagliani	Lee Bentham	Anthony Lazzaro
10	Elkhart Lake	Wisconsin	August 16, 1998	15	6.4372	96.558	0'37:07.249	156.071 km/h	Anthony Lazzaro	Anthony Lazzaro	Anthony Lazzaro	Andrew Bordin
11	Vancouver	Canada	September 5, 1998	38	2.8999586	110.1984268	1'00:59.908	108.395 km/h	Andrew Bordin	Jeff Shafer	Matt Sielsky	Rino Mastronardi
12	Monterey	California	September 12, 1998	28	3.6016134	100.8451752	0'44:11.726	136.908 km/h	Anthony Lazzaro	Lee Bentham	Lee Bentham	Alexandre Tagliani
13	Houston	Texas	October 4, 1998	30	2.4574011	73.722033	0'41:26.827	106.722 km/h	Anthony Lazzaro	Alexandre Tagliani	Anthony Lazzaro	David Rutledge

Note:

Race 3 stopped earlier due to rain, originally scheduled over 50 laps.

== Final points standings ==
=== Driver ===
For every race the points were awarded: 20 points to the winner, 16 for runner-up, 14 for third place, 12 for fourth place, 11 for fifth place, winding down to 1 point for 15th place. Lower placed drivers did not award points. Additional points were awarded to the pole winner (1 point) and to the driver leading the most laps (1 point). C2-class drivers were not able to score points in the main class.

Place	Name	Country	Team	Chassis	Total points	(United States)	(United States)	(United States)	(United States)	(Canada)	(United States)	(Canada)	(Canada)	(United States)	(United States)	(Canada)	(United States)	(United States)
1	Lee Bentham	Canada	Forsythe Racing	Ralt	163	-	10	11
1	Lee Bentham	Canada	Forsythe Racing	Swift	163				16	21	11	17	14	21	-	10	18	14
2	Andrew Bordin	Canada	BDJS	Ralt	139	16	16	16	11	11		6	11
2	Andrew Bordin	Canada	BDJS	Swift	139						-			11	-	20	9	12
3	Memo Gidley	United States	Lynx Racing	Ralt	134	21	12	20	21	-
3	Memo Gidley	United States	Lynx Racing	Swift	134						2	10	12	-	16	9	-	11
4	Anthony Lazzaro	United States	PPI Motorsports	Swift	133	-	-	15	10	6	16	-	16	7	22	-	20	21
5	Alexandre Tagliani	Canada	Forsythe Racing	Ralt	130	6
5	Alexandre Tagliani	Canada	Forsythe Racing	Swift	130		-	6	14	17	12	21	22	1	2	-	12	17
6	Matt Sielsky	United States	D&L Racing	Ralt	109	-	14	9	12	12
6	Matt Sielsky	United States	D&L Racing	Swift	109						6	12	8	14	-	15	-	7
7	Buddy Rice	United States	Lynx Racing	Ralt	108	3	22	12	5	14
7	Buddy Rice	United States	Lynx Racing	Swift	108						14	-	-	16	-	11	11	-
8	Kenny Wilden	Canada	Shank Racing	Swift	92	8	-	-	-	10	20	14	9	-	14	3	14	-
9	David Rutledge	Canada	Binder Racing	Ralt	70	-	11
9	David Rutledge	Canada	Binder Racing	Swift	70			7	8	4	2	5	3	4	8	-	8	10
10	Rob MacDonald	Canada	P-1 Racing	Swift	62	3	-	-	7	8	-	9	2	9	9	12	3	-
11	Rino Mastronardi	Italy	Condor Motorsports	Swift	56	-	-	-	-	-	-	11	7	12	-	16	10	-
12	David Pook	United States	Hylton Motorsports	Swift	51	-	9	10	-	-	9	-	6	10	7	-	-	-
13	Derek Hill	United States	P-1 Racing	Swift	47	12	-	-	6	-	7	4	-	6	11	1	-	-
14	Mike Conte	United States	World Speed Motorsports	Swift	41	-					3	-	-	-	10	6	7	-
14	Mike Conte	United States	World Speed Motorsports	Ralt	41		8	5	2	-
15	Case Montgomery	United States	Condor Motorsports	Swift	39	5	5	8	4	-	10	-	1	-	-	-	-	6
16	Michael David	United States	PDR Enterprises	Ralt	37	10	6	-	-	9	-	-	5	2	-	5	-	-
17	Andrea Delorenzi	Italy	RDS Motorsports	Ralt	35	14	1	-	1	5	-	-	-	-
17	Andrea Delorenzi	Italy	RDS Motorsports	Swift	35										4	8	2	-
18	Jeff Shafer	United States	PPI Motorsports	Swift	32	-	-	-	9	-	-	-	10	-	12	1	-	-
19	Masaoki Nagashima	Japan	PPI Motorsports	Swift	31	-	-	3	-	7	8	-	-	8	-	-	5	-
20	Eric Lang	United States	D&L Racing	Swift	29	9								-	6	-	4	3
20	Eric Lang	United States	D&L Racing	Ralt	29		2	-	-	-	5	-	-
21	John Rutherford	United States	Shank Racing	Swift	21	4	3	2	-	-	-	-	-	5	-	7	-	-
22	Robert Sollenskog	Sweden	BRS Motorsports	Swift	21	-	-	-	3	3	-	7	-	3	5	-	-	-
23	Jean-François Dumoulin	Canada	Team Scalzo	Ralt	12	-	-	-	-	-	-	8	4	-	-	-	-	-
24	Steve Imhoff	United States	Hammerhead Racing	Ralt	11	11	-	-	-	-	-	-	-	-	-	-	-	-
25	Mark Tague	United States	World Speed Motorsports	Ralt	11	-	7	4	-	-	-	-	-	-	-	-	-	-
26	Cam Binder	Canada	Binder Racing	Swift	11	-	-	-	-	-	-	-	-	-	-	-	6	5
27	Nicolas Rondet	France	World Speed Motorsports	Swift	9	-	-	-	-	-	-	-	-	-	-	-	-	9
28	Ted Sahley	United States	Olsson Engineering	Ralt	9	-	4	1	-	-	4	-	-	-	-	-	-	-
29	Steve Cameron	New Zealand	Lynx Racing	Swift	8	-	-	-	-	-	-	-	-	-	-	-	-	8
30	Bob Siska	United States	RJS Motorsport	Ralt	7	7	-	-	-	-	-	-	-	-	-	-	-	-
31	Joe Sposato	United States	Sposato Motor Racing	Ralt	6	-	-	-	-	2	-	-	-	1	-	-	1	2
32	Luc Lesage	Canada	?	Ralt	5	-	-	-	-	-	-	3	-	-	-	2	-	-
33	Rennie Clayton	United States	RPS Motorsport	Ralt	4	-	-	-	-	-	-	-	-	-	-	4	-	-
	John Brooks	United States	BBGP Racing	Ralt	4	-	-	-	-	-	-	-	-	-	-	-	-	4
35	Steve Forrer	United States	Forrer Racing	Ralt	3	-	-	-	-	-	-	-	-	-	3	-	-	-
36	Sergi Szortyka	United States	J&J Racing	Ralt	2	-	-	-	-	-	-	2	-	-	-	-	-	-
37	Zak Brown	United States	Active Motorsports	Swift	2	-	-	-	-	1	-	-	-	-	1	-	-	-
38	Dan Vosloo	United States	Danvo Racing	Ralt	1	1	-	-	-	-	-	-	-	-	-	-	-	-
	Bob Thomas	United States	Olsson Engineering	Ralt	1	-	-	-	-	-	1	-	-	-	-	-	-	-
	Frank Allers	Canada	Johnston Engineering	Reynard	1	-	-	-	-	-	-	1	-	-	-	-	-	-
	Scott Wood	United States	RDS Motorsports	Ralt	1	-	-	-	-	-	-	-	-	-	-	-	-	1

Note:

Race 3 only one additional point awarded to Anthony Lazzaro, maybe because the race was abandoned.

Race 4 no additional point for the qualifying was awarded, because no session was held due to repair work on the track, starting lineup based on Friday morning practice times.

== See also ==
- 1998 CART season
- 1998 Indy Lights season
- 1998 Indy Racing League season
