= 1999 Atlantic Championship =

1999 Toyota Atlantic Championship season
- KOOL Toyota Atlantic Championship

Season
- Races: 12
- Start date: April 17th
- End date: September 26th

Awards
- Drivers' champion: (United States) Anthony Lazzaro

The 1999 Toyota Atlantic Championship season was contested over 12 rounds. The KOOL Toyota Atlantic Championship Drivers' Champion was Anthony Lazzaro driving for PPI Motorsports. 19 different teams and 44 different drivers competed. In this one-make formula all drivers had to utilize Swift chassis and Toyota engines. This season also saw a C2-class running older Ralt chassis and Toyota engines. In C2-class seven different drivers competed, but none of them for the whole season.

== Calendar ==
Rnd	Track	Location	Date	Laps	Distance	Time	Speed	Winning driver	Pole position	Most Laps Lead	Fastest lap
1	Long Beach	California	April 17, 1999	37	2.9353632=108.6084384 km	0'55:00.743	118.455 km/h	Alexandre Tagliani	Kenny Wilden	Alexandre Tagliani	Nicolas Rondet
2	Nazareth	Pennsylvania	May 1, 1999	60	1.5223978=91.343868 km	0'30:28.459	179.844 km/h	Anthony Lazzaro	Anthony Lazzaro	Anthony Lazzaro	Anthony Lazzaro
3	Madison	Illinois	May 29, 1999	50	2.011625=100.58125 km	0'32:53.296	183.496 km/h	Anthony Lazzaro	Anthony Lazzaro	Anthony Lazzaro	Anthony Lazzaro; David Rutledge
4	Milwaukee	Wisconsin	June 5, 1999	60	1.6607976=99.647856 km	0'44:32.396	134.236 km/h	Lee Bentham	Anthony Lazzaro	Lee Bentham	David Rutledge
5	Montréal	Canada	June 12, 1999	27	4.4207471=119.3601717 km	0'44:15.779	161.797 km/h	Alexandre Tagliani	Alexandre Tagliani	Alexandre Tagliani	Buddy Rice
6	Elkhart Lake	Wisconsin	July 11, 1999	17	6.4372=109.4324 km	0'35:37.944	184.269 km/h	Andrew Bordin	Alexandre Tagliani	Andrew Bordin	Buddy Rice
7	Trois-Rivières	Canada	August 1, 1999	45	2.4477453=110.1485385 km	0'53:56.942	122.503 km/h	Anthony Lazzaro	Anthony Lazzaro	Anthony Lazzaro	Anthony Lazzaro
8	Lexington	Ohio	August 8, 1999	30	3.6337994=109.013982 km	0'40:13.032	162.638 km/h	Kenny Wilden	Kenny Wilden	Anthony Lazzaro	Kenny Wilden
9	Cicero	Illinois	August 21, 1999	60	1.6559697=99.358182 km	0'32:37.958	182.685 km/h	Sam Hornish Jr.	Andrew Bordin	Andrew Bordin	Sam Hornish Jr.
10	Vancouver	Canada	September 5, 1999	33	2.8661633=94.5833889 km	0'57:35.599	98.536 km/h	Will Langhorne	Alexandre Tagliani	Will Langhorne	Alexandre Tagliani
11	Monterey	California	September 11, 1999	30	3.6016134=108.048402 km	0'43:34.707	148.764 km/h	Anthony Lazzaro	Anthony Lazzaro	Anthony Lazzaro	Andrew Bordin
12	Houston	Texas	September 26, 1999	43	2.4574011=105.6682473 km	0'57:57.000	109.406 km/h	Andrew Bordin	Buddy Rice	Anthony Lazzaro	Buddy Rice

== Final points standings ==
=== Driver ===
==== Main championship ====
For every race the points were awarded: 20 points to the winner, 16 for runner-up, 14 for third place, 12 for fourth place, 10 for fifth place, 8 for sixth place, 6 seventh place, winding down to 1 point for 12th place. Lower placed drivers did not award points. Additional points were awarded to the pole winner (1 point) and to the driver leading the most laps (1 point). C2-class drivers were not able to score points in the main class.

Place	Name	Country	Team	Total points	(United States)	(United States)	(United States)	(United States)	(Canada)	(United States)	(Canada)	(United States)	(United States)	(Canada)	(United States)	(United States)
1	Anthony Lazzaro	United States	PPI Motorsports	197	16	22	22	11	14	12	22	15	16	8	22	17
2	Kenny Wilden	Canada	Shank Racing	150	1	16	4	16	12	10	16	21	14	16	12	12
3	Andrew Bordin	Canada	PPI Motorsports	121	-	14	6	-	-	21	10	12	10	14	14	20
4	Alexandre Tagliani	Canada	Forsythe Racing	118	21	-	14	-	22	15	12	16	5	3	-	10
5	Buddy Rice	United States	Lynx Racing	113	12	8	8	14	16	16	-	-	10	12	16	1
6	Lee Bentham	Canada	Forsythe Racing	71	14	4	-	21	5	5	-	-	12	-	10	-
7	Sam Hornish Jr.	United States	Shank Racing	67	5	-	12	5	1	4	-	6	20	3	8	3
8	Will Langhorne	United States	Active Motorsports	60	4	-	-	-	-	3	8	10	-	21	-	14
9	David Rutledge	Canada	Forsythe Racing	58	-	12	16	3	8	6	-	4	4	-	-
9	David Rutledge	Canada	Binder Racing	58												5
10	Jean-Francois Veilleux	Canada	P-1 Racing	49	6	10	1	6	3	-	5	5	-	10	3	-
11	Nicolas Rondet	France	World Speed Motorsports	40	-	6	10	12	-	-	14	-2	-	-	-	-
12	Alex Gurney	United States	P-1 Racing	38	-	5	2	-	10	-	6	1	-	-	6	8
	Mike Conte	United States	Lynx Racing	38	-	3	5	8	4	-	-	3	1	5	5	4
14	Rocky Moran Jr.	United States	P-1 Racing	18	-	-	-	-	-	-	-	8	6	4	-	-
15	David Besnard	Australia	Hylton Motorsports	16	8	2	-	-	6	-	-	-	-	-	-	-
	Masaoki Nagashima	Japan	Shank Racing	16	3	-	-	-	2	1	4	-	2	-	4	-
17	Cam Binder	Canada	Binder Racing	11	-	-	3	1	-	2	-	-	3	-	2	-
18	Elton Julian	United States	PDR Enterprises	10	10	-	-	-	-	-	-	-	-	-	-	-
19	Tony Ave	United States	Olsson Engineering	9	-	1	-	-	-	8	-	-	-	-	-	-
	Jean-François Dumoulin	Canada	Condor Motorsports	9	-	-	-	-	-	-	3	-	-	6	-	-
21	Rino Mastronardi	Italy	Condor Motorsports	6	-	-	-	-	-	-	-	-	-	-	-	6
	Bob Perona	United States	MediaOne Racing	6	2	-	-	-	-	-	2	-	-	-	-	2
23	Imran Husain	India	Condor Motorsports	4	-	-	-	4	-	-	-	-	-	-	-	-
	Tom Wieringa	United States	Olsson Engineering	4	-	-	-	2	-	-	1	-	-	1	-	-
25	Mauro Fartuszek	Argentina	Condor Motorsports	3	-	-	-	-	-	-	-	2	-	-	1	-
26	John Brooks	United States	BBGP Racing	1	1	-	-	-	-	-	-	-	-	-	-	-
	Jim Lovett	United States	Active Motorsports	1	-	-	-	-	-	-	-	-	-	-	-	1

Note:

Race 8 Nicolas Rondet had 2 points deduction due to taking unjustifiable risk.

==== C2-Class championship ====
Points system see above. But additional points only awarded for the fastest qualifier. No additional point awarded to the driver leading the most laps.

Place	Name	Country	Team	Total points	(United States)	(United States)	(United States)	(United States)	(Canada)	(United States)	(Canada)	(United States)	(United States)	(Canada)	(United States)	(United States)
1	Bob Siska	United States	RJS Motorsport	109	14	-	-	-	12	14	21	-	-	16	12	20
2	Brian Westerlund	Canada	Empire Racing	80	-	-	-	-	16	16	16	-	-	15	16	1
3	Joe Sposato	United States	Sposato MotorRacing	63	-	-	-	-	21	21	-	-	-	-	21	-
4	Joe Asturi	United States	Sage Motorsport	56	12	-	-	-	11
4	Joe Asturi	United States	Velex Racing	56						12	-	21	-	-	-	-
5	Tom Jagerman	United States	Olsson Engineering	34	-	-	-	-	-	-	-	-	-	20	14	-
6	Steve Forrer	United States	Forrer Racing	30	16	-	-	-	14	-	-	-	-	-	-	-
7	Romeo Kapudija	United States	Olsson Engineering	21	21	-	-	-	-	-	-	-	-	-	-	-

Note:

No more competitors in C2-class. Four races without a single entry.

== Complete overview ==
first column of every race	10	= grid position

second column of every race	10	= race result

R22=retired, but classified NS=did not start

Place	Name	Country	Team	(United States)		(United States)		(United States)		(United States)		(Canada)		(United States)		(Canada)		(United States)		(United States)		(Canada)		(United States)		(United States)
1	Anthony Lazzaro	United States	PPI Motorsports	3	2	1	1	1	1	1	5	2	3	4	4	1	1	3	3	3	2	3	6	1	1	2	2
2	Kenny Wilden	Canada	Shank Racing	1	18	6	2	10	9	3	2	5	4	10	5	3	2	1	1	5	3	4	2	11	4	5	4
3	Andrew Bordin	Canada	PPI Motorsports	4	R22	4	3	2	7	4	R19	4	15	2	1	8	5	2	4	1	6	8	3	3	3	3	1
4	Alexandre Tagliani	Canada	Forsythe Racing	2	1	2	R16	3	3	2	R18	1	1	1	3	2	4	5	2	9	8	1	11	2	R23	6	5
5	Buddy Rice	United States	Lynx Racing	5	4	8	6	4	6	10	3	6	2	3	2	4	R21	7	R16	7	5	2	4	5	2	1	16
6	Lee Bentham	Canada	Forsythe Racing	6	3	13	9	-	-	8	1	14	8	6	8	5	R25	6	18	10	4	7	R24	10	5	10	13
7	Sam Hornish Jr.	United States	Shank Racing	13	8	5	R18	7	4	7	8	17	12	13	9	13	R19	10	7	2	1	15	10	6	6	13	10
8	Will Langhorne	United States	Active Motorsports	16	9	-	-	-	-	-	-	3	R22	9	10	6	6	11	5	-	-	5	1	4	R25	4	3
9	David Rutledge	Canada	Forsythe Racing	14	17	3	4	6	2	6	10	9	6	8	7	15	R24	12	9	13	9	9	21	-	-
9	David Rutledge	Canada	Binder Racing																							9	8
10	Jean-Francois Veilleux	Canada	P-1 Racing	12	7	7	5	11	12	16	7	16	10	14	R27	14	8	13	8	16	R17	10	5	16	10	14	R20
11	Nicolas Rondet	France	World Speed Motorsports	7	R21	11	7	5	5	5	4	8	R26	5	R25	7	3	4	R25	-	-	-	-	9	17	8	R23
12	Alex Gurney	United States	Team Green	8	R25	9	8	8	11	11	R13	11	5	11	R26	11	7	8	12	6	13	6	R17	8	7	7	6
	Mike Conte	United States	Lynx Racing	15	R24	15	10	16	8	9	6	12	9	15	14	9	17	17	10	15	12	13	8	14	8	15	9
14	Rocky Moran Jr.	United States	P-1 Racing	-	-	-	-	-	-	-	-	-	-	-	-	12	R18	9	6	4	7	19	9	7	R21	17	R18
15	David Besnard	Australia	Hylton Motorsports	9	6	19	11	-	-	-	-	7	7	-	-	-	-	-	-	-	-	-	-	-	-	-	-
	Masaoki Nagashima	Japan	Shank Racing	17	10	14	15	9	R14	14	15	29	11	16	12	17	9	14	15	8	11	17	R20	12	9	18	R21
17	Cam Binder	Canada	Binder Racing	11	19	17	14	12	10	12	R12	15	18	12	11	10	13	15	13	12	10	12	16	15	11	16	R17
18	Elton Julian	United States	PDR Enterprises	10	5	-	-	-	-	-	-	10	R29	-	-	-	-	-	-	-	-	-	-	-	-	-	-
19	Tony Ave	United States	Olsson Engineering	-	-	12	12	-	-	-	-	-	-	7	6	-	-	-	-	-	-	-	-	-	-	-	-
	Jean-François Dumoulin	Canada	Condor Motorsports	-	-	-	-	-	-	-	-	-	-	-	-	18	10	20	17	-	-	14	7	23	15	-	-
21	Rino Mastronardi	Italy	Condor Motorsports	-	-	-	-	-	-	-	-	-	-	-	-	-	-	-	-	-	-	-	-	-	-	12	7
	Bob Perona	United States	MediaOne Racing	18	12	18	R19	13	R16	15	R17	18	23	19	13	16	11	18	R22	11	R15	20	R18	21	R20	22	11
23	Imran Husain	India	Condor Motorsports	27	R28	-	-	-	-	17	9	26	R27	-	-	-	-	-	-	-	-	-	-	-	-	-	-
	Tom Wieringa	United States	Olsson Engineering	25	20	-	-	-	-	18	11	27	20	27	22	23	12	24	R23	17	R16	25	13	-	-	27	R26
25	Mauro Fartuszek	Argentina	Condor Motorsports	-	-	-	-	-	-	-	-	-	-	-	-	-	-	21	11	-	-	11	R23	17	13	11	R22
26	John Brooks	United States	BBGP Racing	24	14	16	R17	15	13	19	R16	21	16	22	19	25	R22	-	-	-	-	-	-	-	-	24	R24
	Jim Lovett	United States	Active Motorsports	-	-	-	-	-	-	-	-	-	-	-	-	-	-	-	-	-	-	21	19	24	19	21	12
-	Dave Cutler	United States	P-1 Racing	23	R26	10	13	14	R15	13	R14	24	21	20	18	-	-	-	-	-	-
-	Dave Cutler	United States	BBGP Racing																			22	14	18	R22
-	Dave Cutler	United States	Light House Racing																							25	14
-	Christophe Beauvais	Canada	Super-Tec Racing	-	-	-	-	-	-	-	-	19	R28	17	16	19	14	19	19	-	-	-	-	20	14	-	-
-	Matt Sielsky	United States	BBGP Racing	-	-	-	-	-	-	-	-	-	-	-	-	-	-	25	14	14	R14	-	-	-	-	-	-
-	Sergei Szortkya	United States	J&J Racing	-	-	-	-	-	-	-	-	20	14	-	-	-	-	-	-	-	-	-	-	-	-	-	-
-	Eric Jensen	Canada	Jensen Motorsports	22	15	-	-	-	-	-	-	23	17	-	-	24	16	-	-	-	-	-	-	-	-	-	-
-	Peter MacLeod	United States	Hylton Motorsports	-	-	-	-	-	-	-	-	-	-	18	15	20	R23	16	R24	-	-	16	R25	13	R26	19	R25
-	Marcello Gaffoglio	Brazil	Condor Motorsports	20	16	-	-	-	-	-	-	-	-	-	-	-	-	-	-	-	-	-	-	-	-	-	-
-	Scott Wood	United States	Hylton Motorsports	-	-	-	-	-	-	-	-	-	-	-	-	-	-	-	-	-	-	-	-	-	-	23	R19
-	Stephen Sardelli	United States	J&J Racing	-	-	-	-	-	-	-	-	-	-	25	23	-	-	23	21	-	-	-	-	-	-	-	-
-	Gary Peterson	United States	Intercar Motorsport	29	R27	-	-	-	-	-	-	-	-	-	-	-	-	-	-	-	-	-	-	-	-	-	-
C2-Class				(United States)		(United States)		(United States)		(United States)		(Canada)		(United States)		(Canada)		(United States)		(United States)		(Canada)		(United States)		(United States)
1	Bob Siska	United States	RJS Motorsport	26	R23	-	-	-	-	-	-	25	R25	23	21	21	15	-	-	-	-	23	15	22	R24	26	15
2	Brian Westerlund	Canada	Empire Racing	-	-	-	-	-	-	-	-	30	19	24	20	22	R20	-	-	-	-	18	R22	25	16	20	NS
3	Joe Sposato	United States	Sposato Motor Racing	-	-	-	-	-	-	-	-	13	13	21	17	-	-	-	-	-	-	-	-	19	12	-	-
4	Joe Asturi	United States	Sage Motorsport	28	R29	-	-	-	-	-	-	28	R30
4	Joe Asturi	United States	Velex Racing											26	24	-	-	22	20	-	-	-	-	-	-	-	-
5	Tom Jagerman	United States	Olsson Engineering	-	-	-	-	-	-	-	-	-	-	-	-	-	-	-	-	-	-	24	12	26	18	-	-
6	Steve Forrer	United States	Forrer Racing	21	13	-	-	-	-	-	-	22	R24	-	-	-	-	-	-	-	-	-	-	-	-	-	-
7	Romeo Kapudija	United States	Olsson Engineering	19	11	-	-	-	-	-	-	-	-	-	-	-	-	-	-	-	-	-	-	-	-	-	-

== See also ==
- 1999 CART season
- 1999 Indy Lights season
- 1999 Indy Racing League season
