= Zak Morioka =

Brazilian racing driver

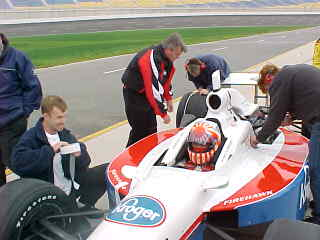
Zak Morioka Kentucky Speedway

Zaqueu "Zak" Morioka (born November 6, 1978) is a racecar driver from São Paulo, Brazil. He won the USAC Formula Ford 2000 Championship in 1997. In 2000, he competed in one Indy Racing League contest for Revista Motors/Tri Star Motorsports. He finished in fifteenth position in the race.

== IRL IndyCar Series ==
Year	Team	Chassis	No.	Engine	1	2	3	4	5	6	7	8	9	Rank	Points	Ref
2000	Tri-Star Motorsports	Dallara	21	Oldsmobile	WDW	PHX	LSV	INDY	TEX	PIK	ATL	KTY	TEX; 15	36th	15	
