= List of IndyCar Series drivers =

The IndyCar Series is the premier open-wheel car racing series in the United States.

A total of 247 different drivers have competed in at least one race. The New Zealander Scott Dixon is the driver with the most races contested, 437 in total, with the most championships won, with six titles, and with the most victories, with 59; and the Australian Will Power is the driver with the most poles, with 65.

In 2008, the IRL was reunified with Champ Car. From Champ Car, three races were added to the calendar: Long Beach, Edmonton and Surfers Paradise. The race in Edmonton took place as scheduled in August; however, the Long Beach event ended up coinciding with the date of the Japan race, and the races were held on the same weekend (the Champ Car teams raced in Long Beach, and the remaining teams in Japan), with points awarded normally, except for the drivers who competed only in the Long Beach race during the 2008 season. The Surfers Paradise round took place in October; however, it was a non-championship event and did not count points toward the competition.

The list includes all drivers who have participated in at least one race in the series, including those who competed only in the Indianapolis 500 and the 2008 Toyota Grand Prix of Long Beach. Drivers who competed in the most recent race are highlighted in blue; drivers who have been champions and competed in the most recent race are highlighted in blue; drivers who have been champions and did not compete in the most recent race are highlighted in orange; and other drivers who competed in the most recent race and were not champions are highlighted in green. The list is updated through the 2026 Mission Foods Grand Prix of Monterey.

The results of the 2008 Nikon Indy 300, in Surfers Paradise, a non-championship event, were not included in the list. The results of two races canceled during the race weekend, the 1999 VisionAire 500K and the 2011 IZOD IndyCar World Championship, were also disregarded.

== Drivers ==
Key
Symbol	Meaning
~	Driver has competed in 2026 and has won a championship
*	Driver has competed in 2026 and has not won a championship
^	Driver has won a championship and has not competed in 2026

Name	Country	Seasons	Championships	Starts	Poles	Wins	Podiums	Laps lead	Ref.
Jacob Abel*	United States	2025–2026	0	17	0	0	0	7	
Michele Alboreto	Italy	1996–1997	0	5	0	0	1	0	
Mikhail Aleshin	Russia	2014–2017	0	46	1	0	2	125	
Jean Alesi	France	2012	0	1	0	0	0	0	
A. J. Allmendinger	United States	2013	0	6	0	0	0	23	
Fernando Alonso	Spain	2017, 2019–2020	0	2	0	0	0	27	
Didier André	France	2001	0	12	0	0	0	27	
John Andretti	United States	2007–2011	0	10	0	0	0	0	
Marco Andretti	United States	2006–2025	0	253	6	2	20	1,035	
Michael Andretti	United States	2001–2003, 2006–2007	0	8	0	0	5	85	
Juho Annala	Finland	2008	0	1	0	0	0	0	
Richard Antinucci	United States	2009	0	5	0	0	0	0	
Marcus Armstrong*	New Zealand	2023–2026	0	59	0	0	2	77	
Oliver Askew	United States	2020–2021	0	17	0	0	1	19	
Bertrand Baguette	Belgium	2010–2011	0	16	0	0	0	11	
Stanton Barrett	United States	2009	0	4	0	0	0	0	
Rubens Barrichello	Brazil	2012	0	14	0	0	0	3	
Alex Barron	United States	2001–2005, 2007	0	62	0	2	5	87	
Dillon Battistini	Great Britain	2011	0	1	0	0	0	0	
Ana Beatriz	Brazil	2010–2013	0	29	0	0	0	0	
Donnie Beechler	United States	1998–2001	0	36	0	0	2	48	
Townsend Bell	United States	2004–2006, 2008–2016	0	28	0	0	0	13	
Enrique Bernoldi	Brazil	2008	0	15	0	0	0	3	
René Binder	Austria	2018	0	6	0	0	0	0	
Tom Blomqvist	Great Britain	2023–2024	0	8	0	0	0	0	
Billy Boat	United States	1997–2003	0	63	9	1	7	324	
Raul Boesel	Brazil	1998–2000, 2002	0	27	0	0	0	59	
Claude Bourbonnais	Canada	1997	0	1	0	0	0	0	
Sébastien Bourdais	France	2005, 2011–2021	0	151	3	6	13	577	
Matthew Brabham	Australia	2016	0	2	0	0	0	0	
Kenny Bräck^	Sweden	1997–1999, 2002–2003, 2005	1 (1998)	46	0	4	9	459	
Colin Braun	United States	2024	0	1	0	0	0	0	
Scott Brayton	United States	1996	0	2	0	0	0	0	
Butch Brickell	United States	1996	0	0	0	0	0	0	
Ryan Briscoe	Australia	2005–2015	0	135	13	7	27	1,446	
Jeff Bucknum	United States	2005–2006	0	11	0	0	0	0	
Robbie Buhl	United States	1996–2004	0	78	0	2	9	285	
Jim Buick	United States	1996	0	0	0	0	0	0	
Kurt Busch	United States	2014	0	1	0	0	0	0	
Tatiana Calderón	Colombia	2022	0	7	0	0	0	1	
Buzz Calkins^	United States	1996–2001	1 (1996)	53	0	1	3	148	
Jaime Camara	Brazil	2008	0	14	0	0	0	44	
Agustín Canapino	Argentina	2023–2024	0	28	0	0	0	3	
Juan Carlos Carbonell	Chile	1997	0	1	0	0	0	0	
Tyce Carlson	United States	1997–2002	0	29	0	0	0	4	
Ed Carpenter*	United States	2003–2026	0	208	4	3	9	393	
Patrick Carpentier	Canada	2005, 2011	0	17	0	0	2	30	
Adam Carroll	Great Britain	2010	0	2	0	0	0	0	
Hélio Castroneves*	Brazil	2001–2026	0	317	48	25	84	5,128	
Alfonso Celis Jr.	Mexico	2018	0	2	0	0	0	0	
Gabby Chaves	Colombia	2015–2018	0	39	0	0	0	31	
Eddie Cheever Jr.	United States	1996–2002, 2006	0	77	1	5	9	611	
P. J. Chesson	United States	2006–2007	0	5	0	0	0	0	
Max Chilton	Great Britain	2016–2021	0	83	0	0	0	83	
Zachary Claman DeMelo	Canada	2017–2018	0	10	0	0	0	7	
Bryan Clauson	United States	2012, 2015–2016	0	3	0	0	0	3	
Caio Collet*	Brazil	2026	0	18	0	0	0	7	
Stefano Coletti	Monaco	2015	0	16	0	0	0	0	
Mike Conway	Great Britain	2009–2014	0	72	1	4	7	0	
Wade Cunningham	New Zealand	2011–2012	0	5	0	0	0	0	
Conor Daly*	United States	2013, 2015–2026	0	133	1	0	2	213	
Paul Dana	United States	2005–2006	0	3	0	0	0	0	
Airton Daré	Brazil	2000–2003, 2006	0	39	0	1	3	37	
James Davison	Australia	2013–2015, 2017–2020	0	8	0	0	0	2	
Devlin DeFrancesco	United States	2022–2023, 2025	0	51	0	0	0	27	
Gil de Ferran	Brazil	2001–2003	0	31	5	5	16	1,036	
João Paulo de Oliveira	Brazil	2011	0	1	0	0	0	0	
Simona de Silvestro	Switzerland	2010–2013, 2015, 2021–2022	0	73	0	0	1	5	
John de Vries	Australia	2002	0	4	0	0	0	0	
Rick DeLorto	United States	1996	0	0	0	0	0	0	
Doug Didero	Canada	1999–2000	0	6	0	0	0	0	
Mark Dismore	United States	1996–2002	0	58	4	1	4	483	
Scott Dixon~	New Zealand	2003–2026	6 (2003, 08, 13, 15, 18, 20)	437	32	59	144	6,917	
Mario Domínguez	Mexico	2008	0	7	0	0	1	0	
Robert Doornbos	Netherlands	2009	0	17	0	0	0	2	
Francesco Dracone	Italy	2010, 2015	0	7	0	0	0	0	
Dan Drinan	United States	1996, 1998, 2000	0	0	0	0	0	0	
Milka Duno	Venezuela	2007–2010	0	43	0	0	0	5	
Paul Durant	United States	1996–1998	0	5	0	0	0	0	
RC Enerson	United States	2016, 2019, 2021, 2023	0	6	0	0	0	0	
Tomáš Enge	Czech Republic	2004–2006	0	17	0	0	0	20	
Marcus Ericsson*	Sweden	2019–2026	0	127	1	4	13	294	
Brandon Erwin	United States	2001	0	4	0	0	0	0	
Wim Eyckmans	Belgium	1999	0	1	0	0	0	0	
Adrian Fernández	Mexico	2004–2005	0	16	0	3	4	173	
Santino Ferrucci*	United States	2018–2026	0	109	1	0	3	172	
Alex Figge	United States	2008	0	1	0	0	0	0	
Luca Filippi	Italy	2013–2016	0	23	0	0	1	2	
Sarah Fisher	United States	1999–2004, 2006–2010	0	83	1	0	2	49	
Pietro Fittipaldi	Brazil	2018, 2021–2024	0	26	0	0	0	2	
Louis Foster*	Great Britain	2025–2026	0	31	2	0	0	17	
Larry Foyt	United States	2004–2006	0	3	0	0	0	0	
A. J. Foyt IV	United States	2003–2010	0	84	0	0	1	19	
Dario Franchitti^	Great Britain	2002–2007, 2009–2013	4 (2007, 09, 10, 11)	151	23	21	59	3,663	
Racin Gardner	United States	1996	0	1	0	0	0	0	
Luca Ghiotto	Italy	2024	0	4	0	0	0	0	
Affonso Giaffone	Brazil	1997–1998	0	8	0	0	0	29	
Felipe Giaffone	Brazil	2001–2006	0	61	0	1	8	290	
Memo Gidley	Mexico	2000–2002	0	1	0	0	0	0	
Phil Giebler	United States	2007–2008	0	1	0	0	0	0	
Rodolfo González	Venezuela	2015	0	6	0	0	0	5	
Scott Goodyear	Canada	1997–2001	0	39	1	3	12	653	
Robby Gordon	United States	1997, 1999–2004	0	8	0	0	0	110	
Joe Gosek	United States	1996–1998	0	2	0	0	0	0	
Marco Greco	Brazil	1996–1999	0	23	1	0	1	37	
Stéphan Grégoire	France	1996–2001, 2006	0	46	0	0	1	89	
Mike Groff	United States	1996–1999	0	12	0	0	3	0	
Robbie Groff	United States	1997–1998	0	7	0	0	0	3	
Romain Grosjean*	France	2021–2024, 2026	0	77	3	0	7	155	
Roberto Guerrero	Colombia	1996–2001	0	25	0	0	0	101	
Jim Guthrie	United States	1996–1999, 2001	0	15	0	1	1	89	
Esteban Gutiérrez	Mexico	2017	0	7	0	0	0	0	
Davey Hamilton	United States	1996–2001, 2007–2011	0	56	0	0	8	76	
Ben Hanley	Great Britain	2019–2020	0	4	0	0	0	0	
Scott Harrington	United States	1996–2000, 2002	0	13	0	0	0	1	
Jack Harvey*	Great Britain	2017–2026	0	95	0	0	1	10	
Shigeaki Hattori	Japan	2000–2003	0	26	0	0	0	28	
Dennis Hauger*	Norway	2026	0	18	0	0	0	0	
Jack Hawksworth	Great Britain	2014–2016	0	49	0	0	1	48	
Richie Hearn	United States	1996–1997, 2000–2005, 2007	0	25	2	1	2	140	
Jon Herb	United States	2000–2002, 2006–2007	0	16	0	0	0	0	
Bryan Herta	United States	2003–2006	0	58	3	2	7	355	
Colton Herta	United States	2018–2025	0	116	16	9	20	1,171	
Jack Hewitt	United States	1998	0	2	0	0	0	0	
J. R. Hildebrand	United States	2010–2020	0	68	0	0	3	123	
Andy Hillenburg	United States	2000	0	1	0	0	0	0	
James Hinchcliffe	Canada	2011–2021	0	161	1	6	18	781	
John Hollansworth Jr.	United States	1999–2001	0	12	0	0	0	0	
Sam Hornish Jr.^	United States	2000–2007	3 (2001, 02, 06)	116	12	19	47	3,427	
Jay Howard	Great Britain	2008, 2010–2011, 2017–2018	0	14	0	0	0	0	
Carlos Huertas	Colombia	2014–2015	0	21	0	1	1	7	
Ryan Hunter-Reay~	United States	2007–2021, 2023–2026	1 (2012)	253	6	16	44	1,345	
Callum Ilott	Great Britain	2021–2025	0	55	0	0	0	18	
James Jakes	Great Britain	2011–2013, 2015	0	66	0	0	2	28	
Ronnie Johncox	United States	1999–2000	0	8	0	0	0	0	
Jimmie Johnson	United States	2021–2022	0	29	0	0	0	21	
Davy Jones	United States	1996, 2000	0	1	0	0	1	46	
Ed Jones	United Arab Emirates	2017–2019, 2021	0	63	0	0	3	5	
P. J. Jones	United States	2002, 2004, 2006–2007	0	2	0	0	0	0	
Niclas Jönsson	Sweden	1999–2000	0	3	0	0	0	0	
Michel Jourdain Jr.	Mexico	1996–1997, 2012–2013	0	4	0	0	1	0	
Bruno Junqueira	Brazil	2001–2002, 2004–2005, 2008, 2010, 2012	0	22	1	0	0	62	
Kyle Kaiser	United States	2018–2019	0	6	0	0	0	2	
Tony Kanaan^	Brazil	2002–2023	1 (2004)	296	11	16	73	3,653	
Sage Karam	United States	2014–2022	0	25	0	0	1	16	
Dalton Kellett	Canada	2020–2022	0	41	0	0	0	0	
Charlie Kimball	United States	2011–2021	0	157	1	1	6	163	
Jordan King	Great Britain	2018–2019	0	12	0	0	0	11	
Steve Kinser	United States	1997	0	1	0	0	0	0	
Kyle Kirkwood*	United States	2022–2026	0	86	4	7	12	420	
Jimmy Kite	United States	1997–2003, 2005, 2007	0	34	0	0	4	27	
Steve Knapp	United States	1998–2001	0	13	0	0	1	0	
Cory Kruseman	United States	2002	0	1	0	0	0	0	
David Kudrave	United States	1996–1997	0	3	0	0	0	0	
Will Langhorne	United States	2002	0	3	0	0	0	9	
Kyle Larson	United States	2024–2025	0	2	0	0	0	0	
Buddy Lazier^	United States	1996–2009, 2013–2017	1 (2000)	104	2	8	18	1,019	
Jaques Lazier	United States	1999–2007, 2009–2010	0	56	2	1	3	246	
Anthony Lazzaro	United States	2001–2002	0	6	0	0	0	0	
Jason Leffler	United States	1999–2000	0	3	0	0	0	0	
Katherine Legge	Great Britain	2012–2013, 2023–2024, 2026	0	20	0	0	0	2	
Matheus Leist	Brazil	2018–2019	0	34	0	0	0	0	
Alex Lloyd	Great Britain	2008–2011	0	27	0	0	0	3	
Lucas Luhr	Germany	2013	0	1	0	0	0	0	
Christian Lundgaard*	Denmark	2024–2026	0	87	4	3	16	274	
Linus Lundqvist	Sweden	2023–2024	0	20	1	0	2	37	
Arie Luyendyk	Netherlands	1996–1999, 2001–2003	0	28	4	4	5	427	
Arie Luyendyk Jr.	Netherlands	2005–2006	0	1	0	0	0	0	
George Mack	United States	2002	0	15	0	0	0	0	
Kevin Magnussen	Denmark	2021	0	1	0	0	0	6	
David Malukas*	United States	2022–2026	0	78	1	0	9	317	
Nolan Siegel*	United States	2024–2026	0	37	0	0	0	0	
Pippa Mann	Great Britain	2011, 2013–2019	0	17	0	0	0	0	
Darren Manning	Great Britain	2004–2005, 2007–2009	0	60	0	0	1	26	
David Martínez	Mexico	2008	0	1	0	0	0	0	
Raphael Matos	Brazil	2009–2011	0	38	0	0	0	20	
Hideshi Matsuda	Japan	1996, 1998–2000	0	2	0	0	0	0	
Kosuke Matsuura	Japan	2004–2007, 2009	0	65	0	0	0	31	
Allen May	United States	1997	0	1	0	0	0	0	
Scott Mayer	United States	2003, 2005	0	3	0	0	0	0	
Robby McGehee	United States	1999–2004	0	38	0	0	1	73	
Hunter McElrea	New Zealand	2024	0	1	0	0	0	0	
Scott McLaughlin*	New Zealand	2020–2026	0	103	13	8	26	1,439	
Casey Mears	United States	2001	0	3	0	0	0	0	
Thiago Medeiros	Brazil	2005–2006	0	1	0	0	0	0	
Vitor Meira	Brazil	2002–2011	0	131	2	0	15	483	
Chris Menninga	United States	2001	0	3	0	0	0	0	
Andy Michner	United States	1996, 1998–2000	0	7	0	0	0	9	
Jack Miller	United States	1997–2001	0	22	0	0	0	0	
Nicolas Minassian	France	2001	0	1	0	0	0	0	
Franck Montagny	France	2008–2009, 2014	0	3	0	0	1	0	
Juan Pablo Montoya	Colombia	2000, 2014–2017, 2021–2022	0	57	3	5	13	603	
Mario Moraes	Brazil	2008–2010	0	49	0	0	1	5	
Roberto Moreno	Brazil	1999, 2006–2008	0	5	0	0	0	1	
Zak Morioka	Brazil	2000	0	1	0	0	0	0	
Carlos Muñoz	Colombia	2013–2018	0	73	1	1	7	91	
Brad Murphey	Australia	1996–1997	0	3	0	0	0	0	
Hideki Mutoh	Japan	2007–2011	0	53	0	0	2	75	
Shinji Nakano	Japan	2003	0	2	0	0	0	0	
Josef Newgarden~	United States	2012–2026	2 (2017, 19)	244	20	34	64	4,668	
Hideki Noda	Japan	2002	0	6	0	0	0	0	
Ryan Norman	United States	2021	0	1	0	0	0	0	
Johnny O'Connell	United States	1996–1997	0	4	0	0	0	3	
Danny Ongais	United States	1996–1998	0	2	0	0	0	0	
Patricio O'Ward*	Mexico	2018–2026	0	123	8	12	35	1,050	
Simon Pagenaud^	France	2011–2023	1 (2016)	193	13	15	38	1,294	
Álex Palou*	Spain	2020–2026	5 (2021, 23, 24, 25, 26)	115	20	25	51	2,229	
Giorgio Pantano	Italy	2005, 2011–2012	0	6	0	0	0	0	
Massimiliano Papis	Italy	2002, 2006, 2008	0	3	0	0	0	0	
Johnny Parsons	United States	1996–1997	0	4	0	0	0	0	
Danica Patrick	United States	2005–2011, 2018	0	116	3	1	7	124	
John Paul Jr.	United States	1996–1999, 2001	0	24	0	1	1	101	
Benjamin Pedersen	Denmark	2023	0	17	0	0	0	0	
Franck Perera	France	2008	0	4	0	0	0	0	
Nelson Philippe	France	2008–2009	0	2	0	0	0	0	
Spencer Pigot	United States	2016–2020	0	58	0	0	1	17	
Antônio Pizzonia	Brazil	2008	0	1	0	0	0	0	
Martin Plowman	Great Britain	2011, 2014	0	5	0	0	0	0	
Théo Pourchaire	France	2024	0	6	0	0	0	0	
Will Power~	Australia	2008–2026	2 (2014, 22)	304	65	43	107	5,422	
Graham Rahal*	United States	2008–2026	0	307	5	6	32	620	
Christian Rasmussen*	Denmark	2024–2026	0	43	1	1	3	123	
Greg Ray^	United States	1997–2004	1 (1999)	73	14	5	8	1,193	
Laurent Rédon	France	2001–2002	0	17	0	0	1	39	
Stevie Reeves	United States	1998, 2000	0	4	0	0	0	0	
Bobby Regester	United States	1999–2000	0	2	0	0	0	0	
Tony Renna	United States	2002–2003	0	7	0	0	0	38	
Willy T. Ribbs	United States	1999	0	1	0	0	0	0	
Buddy Rice	United States	2002–2008, 2011	0	99	5	3	8	466	
Sting Ray Robb*	United States	2023–2026	0	66	0	0	0	44	
Billy Roe	United States	1997–1998, 2000–2002	0	16	0	0	0	0	
Mario Romancini	Brazil	2010	0	11	0	0	0	0	
Felix Rosenqvist*	Sweden	2019–2026	0	126	8	2	11	302	
Alexander Rossi*	United States	2016–2026	0	182	7	8	31	1,023	
Marty Roth	Canada	2004–2008	0	21	0	0	0	0	
Sebastián Saavedra	Colombia	2010–2015, 2017	0	65	1	0	0	26	
Eliseo Salazar	Chile	1996–2002	0	53	0	1	4	232	
Gualter Salles	Brazil	1999	0	1	0	0	0	0	
Takuma Sato*	Japan	2010–2026	0	223	10	6	14	989	
Tomas Scheckter	South Africa	2002–2011	0	118	8	2	6	1,368	
Sam Schmidt	United States	1997–1999	0	27	1	1	4	208	
Mick Schumacher*	Germany	2026	0	18	0	0	0	0	
Jeret Schroeder	United States	1997, 1999–2002	0	20	0	0	0	0	
Oriol Servià	Spain	2002, 2008–2009, 2011–2019	0	79	0	0	3	63	
Mike Shank	United States	1997	0	1	0	0	0	0	
Scott Sharp^	United States	1996–2007, 2009	1 (1996)	146	6	9	18	1,067	
Robert Shwartzman	Israel	2025	0	17	1	0	0	8	
Jeff Simmons	United States	2004, 2006–2008	0	26	0	0	0	8	
Kyffin Simpson*	Cayman Islands	2024–2026	0	46	0	0	1	10	
Vincenzo Sospiri	Italy	1997, 1999	0	6	0	0	1	1	
Toby Sowery	Great Britain	2024	0	3	0	0	0	0	
Lyn St. James	United States	1996–2000	0	5	0	0	0	0	
Dave Steele	United States	1997–1999	0	3	0	0	0	0	
Tony Stewart^	United States	1996–1999, 2001	1 (1997)	26	8	3	7	1,515	
Alex Tagliani	Canada	2008–2016	0	74	3	0	0	228	
Tora Takagi	Japan	2003–2004	0	32	0	0	1	27	
Mark Taylor	Great Britain	2004	0	15	0	0	0	4	
Bill Tempero	United States	1996	0	0	0	0	0	0	
Paul Tracy	Canada	2002, 2008–2011	0	20	0	0	1	18	
Rick Treadway	United States	2001–2002	0	11	0	0	0	0	
Ho-Pin Tung	China	2011	0	1	0	0	0	0	
Brian Tyler	United States	1998–1999	0	10	0	0	0	0	
Johnny Unser	United States	1996–2000	0	15	0	0	0	0	
Robby Unser	United States	1998–2000	0	21	0	0	2	45	
Al Unser Jr.	United States	2000–2004, 2006–2007	0	56	0	3	8	599	
Jimmy Vasser	United States	2000–2003, 2008	0	6	0	0	0	6	
Tristan Vautier	France	2013, 2015, 2017, 2025	0	32	0	0	0	27	
Zach Veach	United States	2017–2020	0	47	0	0	0	23	
Rinus VeeKay*	Netherlands	2020–2026	0	115	2	1	6	239	
Fermín Vélez	Spain	1996–1997	0	6	0	0	0	0	
Jacques Villeneuve	Canada	2014	0	1	0	0	0	0	
Jüri Vips	Estonia	2023–2024	0	3	0	0	0	0	
E. J. Viso	Venezuela	2008–2013	0	100	1	0	1	67	
Dennis Vitolo	United States	1997	0	1	0	0	0	0	
Jeff Ward	United States	1997–2002, 2005	0	61	2	1	8	519	
Cody Ware	United States	2021	0	3	0	0	0	0	
Stan Wattles	United States	1996–2001	0	17	0	0	0	2	
Dan Wheldon^	Great Britain	2002–2011	1 (2005)	133	5	16	43	2,865	
Robert Wickens	Canada	2018	0	14	1	0	2	187	
Justin Wilson	Great Britain	2008–2015	0	120	2	3	12	302	
Stefan Wilson	Great Britain	2013, 2016, 2018, 2021–2023	0	5	0	0	0	3	
Cory Witherill	United States	2001	0	2	0	0	0	0	
Roger Yasukawa	United States	2003–2010	0	40	0	0	0	6	
J. J. Yeley	United States	1998, 2000	0	8	0	0	0	0	
Alessandro Zampedri	Italy	1996–1997	0	3	0	0	0	20	

== By country ==
In total, 32 countries have been represented in the IndyCar Series since 1996. The United States is the country with the most drivers in the history of the category, with 117 drivers, followed by Brazil with 25. In first race of the competition at the Walt Disney World Speedway in 1996, six countries were represented.

Drivers who are currently racing are highlighted in green.

Country	Number of drivers	Champion drivers	Championships	Number of drivers currently	Current drivers / Last driver (2026)
Argentina	1	0	0	0	Agustín Canapino 2024
Australia	6	1 Will Power [2x]	2; 2014; 2022	1	Will Power*
Austria	1	0	0	0	René Binder 2018
Belgium	2	0	0	0	Bertrand Baguette 2010
Brazil	25	1 Tony Kanaan	1; 2004	1	Hélio Castroneves*
Canada	12	0	0	0	Devlin DeFrancesco 2025
Cayman Islands	1	0	0	1	Kyffin Simpson*
Chile	2	0	0	0	Eliseo Salazar 2002
China	1	0	0	0	Ho-Pin Tung 2011
Colombia	6	0	0	0	Juan Pablo Montoya 2022
Czech Republic	1	0	0	0	Tomáš Enge 2006
Denmark	3	0	0	2	Christian Lundgaard*; Christian Rasmussen*
Estonia	1	0	0	0	Jüri Vips 2024
Finland	1	0	0	0	Juho Annala 2008
France	11	1 Simon Pagenaud	1; 2016	1	Romain Grosjean*
Germany	2	0	0	1	Mick Schumacher*
Great Britain	20	2 Dario Franchitti [4x] Dan Wheldon	5; 2005; 2007; 2009; 2010; 2011	3	Louis Foster*; Jack Harvey*; Katherine Legge*
Israel	1	0	0	0	Robert Shwartzman 2025
Italy	7	0	0	0	Luca Ghiotto 2024
Japan	8	0	0	1	Takuma Sato*
Mexico	8	0	0	1	Patricio O'Ward*
Monaco	1	0	0	0	Stefano Coletti 2015
Netherlands	4	0	0	1	Rinus VeeKay*
New Zealand	3	1 Scott Dixon [6x]	6; 2003; 2008; 2013; 2015; 2018; 2020	2	Marcus Armstrong*; Scott Dixon*; Scott McLaughlin*
Russia	1	0	0	0	Mikhail Aleshin 2017
South Africa	1	0	0	0	Tomas Scheckter 2011
Spain	4	1 Álex Palou [5x]	5; 2021; 2023; 2024; 2025; 2026	1	Álex Palou*
Sweden	4	1 Kenny Bräck	1; 1998	2	Marcus Ericsson*; Felix Rosenqvist*
Switzerland	1	0	0	0	Simona de Silvestro 2022
United Arab Emirates	1	0	0	0	Ed Jones 2021
United States	117	8 Buzz Calkins; Sam Hornish Jr. [3x] Ryan Hunter-Reay; Buddy Lazier; Josef Newgarden [2x] Greg Ray; Scott Sharp; Tony Stewart	10; 1996; 1997; 1999; 2000; 2001; 2002; 2006; 2012; 2017; 2019	12	Conor Daly*; Santino Ferrucci*; Ryan Hunter-Reay*; Josef Newgarden*; Graham Rahal*; Sting Ray Robb*; Alexander Rossi*; Nolan Siegel*; Jacob Abel*; Kyle Kirkwood*; Ed Carpenter*; David Malukas*
Venezuela	3	0	0	0	Rodolfo González 2015

== See also ==
- List of Indycar races
- List of IndyCar Series racetracks
- List of IndyCar Series teams

== Notes ==
- The drivers Scott Sharp and Buzz Calkins finished tied for first place in the 1996
