= 1996 Barber Dodge Pro Series =

1996 Barber Dodge Pro Series season

Seasons
- ← 1995 1997 →

The 1996 Barber Dodge Pro Series season was the eleventh season of the series. All drivers used Dodge powered Goodyear shod Mondiale chassis. Derek Hill and Tony Renna were named co-Rookies of the Year and were awarded a paid half-season of the 1997 Barber Dodge Pro Series.

== Race calendar and results ==
Round	Circuit	Location	Date	Pole position	Fastest lap	Winning driver
1	St. Petersburg Street Circuit	(United States) St. Petersburg, Florida	February 25	(Argentina) Mauro Fartuszek	(Italy) Rino Mastronardi	(Argentina) Mauro Fartuszek
2	Sebring International Raceway	(United States) Sebring, Florida	March 16	(United States) Tony Renna	(United States) Tony Renna	(United States) Tim Moser
3	Phoenix International Raceway	(United States) Phoenix, Arizona	April 21	(United States) Tony Renna	(United States) Tony Renna	(Sweden) Fredrik Larsson
4	Texas World Speedway	(United States) College Station, Texas	May 5	(Colombia) Andres Gomez	(United States) Tim Moser	(Sweden) Fredrik Larsson
5	Nazareth Speedway	(United States) Lehigh Valley, Pennsylvania	May 18	(Sweden) Fredrik Larsson	not awarded	(Sweden) Fredrik Larsson
6	Watkins Glen International	(United States) Watkins Glen, New York	June 30	(Sweden) Fredrik Larsson	(United States) Geoff Boss	(United States) Geoff Boss
7	Sonoma Raceway	(United States) Sonoma, California	July 14	(Sweden) Fredrik Larsson	(Sweden) Fredrik Larsson	(Sweden) Fredrik Larsson
8	Mid-Ohio Sports Car Course	(United States) Lexington, Ohio	August 4	(Sweden) Fredrik Larsson	(United States) Tim Moser	(Sweden) Fredrik Larsson
9	Road America	(United States) Elkhart Lake, Wisconsin	August 18	(United States) Tony Renna	(United States) Tim Moser	(Norway) Thomas Schie
10	Mazda Raceway Laguna Seca	(United States) Monterey County, California	September 7	(Norway) Thomas Schie	(Norway) Thomas Schie	(Norway) Thomas Schie
11	Reno Grand Prix	(United States) Reno, Nevada	September 22	(Italy) Rino Mastronardi	(United States) Geoff Boss	(United States) Geoff Boss
12	Lime Rock Park	(United States) Lime Rock, Connecticut	October 11	(United States) Derek Hill	(United States) Derek Hill	(United States) Derek Hill

== Final standings ==
Color	Result
Gold	Winner
Silver	2nd place
Bronze	3rd place
Green	4th & 5th place
Light Blue	6th–10th place
Dark Blue	11th place or lower
Purple	Did not finish
Red	Did not qualify (DNQ)
Brown	Withdrawn (Wth)
Black	Disqualified (DSQ)
White	Did not start (DNS)
Blank	Did not participate (DNP)
Blank	Driver replacement (Rpl)
Blank	Injured (Inj)
Blank	No race held (NH)

Rank	Driver	(United States) STP	(United States) SEB	(United States) PIR	(United States) TWS	(United States) NAZ	(United States) WGI	(United States) SON	(United States) MOH	(United States) LAG	(United States) LAG	(United States) REN	(United States) LRP	Points
1	(Sweden) Fredrik Larsson	2	26		1	1	21	1	1	4	24	3	2	163
2	(Norway) Thomas Schie		7		5	2	3	7	3	1	1	2	7	139
3	(United States) Derek Hill	4	14		27	3	6	3	13	3	8	4	1	124
4	(Italy) Rino Mastronardi	3	17		3	7	4	5	9	2	4	5		121
5	(United States) Tim Moser	26	1		2	4	8	8	5	5	5	6	6	117
6	(United States) Geoff Boss	24	28		14	15	1	2	4	8	2	1	5	116
7	(United States) Tony Renna	6	3		28	8	18	4	2	11	3	22	4	105
8	(United States) Jeff Bucknum	16	5		7	5	19	23	17	9	14		3	65
9	(United States) Chris Menninga	14	12		12	12	26	9	6	7	11	7	8	62
10	(United States) Rocky Moran Jr.	20	15		25	13	2	13	12	12	6	8	9	61
11	(Colombia) Andres Gomez	11	6		9	22	24	6	23	6	10	23		49
12	(United States) Memo Gidley	12	11		10	11	25	10	7	10				49
13	(United States) Steven Rikert	7	21		13	17	5	11	11	17	26	9	10	48
14	(United States) Bryan Selby		4		6	9	16	26			9			45
15	(Japan) Seiji Ara	5	8		17	6	23	14	26	13	27	13		41
	(South Africa) Steve Bitzos								27					
	(Brazil) Carlos Bonetti				22	25	12	19	14	19	23	16	12	
	(United States) Jarrett Boon	21	25		21	18	14	20		26	17	11	21	
	(United States) Austin Cameron							15						
	(United States) Cary Capparelli									25		21		
	(United States) Art Coia						27	22	25					
	(United States) Patsy DiFilippo						15	20	24		22	20	22	
	(United States) Jason Engel								16	14				
	(United States) Tim Enoch	23	20											
	(Argentina) Mauro Fartuszek	1	27		4									
	(United States) Sean Patrick Flanery											17	17	
	(United States) Jon Fogarty								10		7		11	
	(United States) E. Kym Fontana				19	20	22							
	(United Kingdom) Divina Galica								18					
	(United States) Micky Gilbert										21			
	(United States) Gary Glanger	18	18											
	(United States) Mark-Paul Gosselaar											10	16	
	(Lebanon) Samer Hindi							25				14		
	(Germany) Michael Kratz						13							
	(Brazil) Leandro Larossa	15	19		11	16	7	24						
	(United States) Steve Lorenzen							21		23	20		23	
	(United States) Will Langhorne										25			
	(United States) Scott Mayer									24				
	(Canada) John McCaig				18	23	20	17	15	27		24		
	(United States) Brian McCarthy		22		26				8	18				
	(United States) G.J. Mennen	13	10		20	19	10	18			19	15	15	
	(United States) Nick O'Sullivan	17	23		15	14	17	27	19	28	13			
	(United States) Brian Pelke									15	16	12		
	(United States) Steve Pelke									22		18		
	(United States) Alfonso Ribeiro											19	14	
	(United States) Matt Robinson								21					
	(France) Nicolas Rondet	22	2		16									
	(United States) Stephen Sardelli									21			18	
	(United States) Jeff Shafer										15			
	(United States) Wes Short	27												
	(United States) Grant Show												20	
	(Switzerland) Phillippe Siffert						9	16					13	
	(United States) Skip Streets	10	13		23	10	11	12			12			
	(United States) John Spangler								22					
	(Denmark) Jakob Sund	9	16											
	(United States) Jerry Tack												19	
	(United States) Joe Vantreese	19	24		24	24				20	18			
	(United States) Jeff Willoughby	25	9		8	21				16				
