= 1997 Barber Dodge Pro Series =

1997 Barber Dodge Pro Series season

Seasons
- ← 1996 1998 →

The 1997 Barber Dodge Pro Series season was the twelfth season of the series. All drivers used Dodge powered Goodyear shod Mondiale chassis. This was the final season the series used the Mondiale chassis and Goodyear tires.

== Race calendar and results ==
Round	Circuit	Location	Date	Pole position	Fastest lap	Winning driver
1	St. Petersburg Street Circuit	(United States) St. Petersburg, Florida	February 23	(Italy) Rino Mastronardi	(Puerto Rico) Victor Gonzalez Jr.	(Italy) Rino Mastronardi
2	Sebring International Raceway	(United States) Sebring, Florida	March 15	(United States) Tony Renna	(United States) Tony Renna	(United States) Derek Hill
3	Hutchinson Island	(United States) Savannah, Georgia	May 18	(United States) Derek Hill	(United States) Rocky Moran Jr.	(United States) Derek Hill
4	Lime Rock Park	(United States) Lime Rock, Connecticut	May 26	(United States) Derek Hill	(Norway) Jarle Gasland	(Italy) Rino Mastronardi
5	Mid-Ohio Sports Car Course	(United States) Lexington, Ohio	June 15	(United States) Derek Hill	(United States) Derek Hill	(United States) Derek Hill
6	Watkins Glen International	(United States) Watkins Glen, New York	June 29	(Italy) Rino Mastronardi	(United States) Derek Hill	(Italy) Rino Mastronardi
7	Grand Prix of Minnesota	(United States) Minneapolis, Minnesota	July 6	(Norway) Jarle Gasland	(United States) Derek Hill	(France) Nicolas Rondet
8	Mid-Ohio Sports Car Course	(United States) Lexington, Ohio	August 10	(France) Nicolas Rondet	(France) Nicolas Rondet	(United States) Andy Boss
9	Road America	(United States) Elkhart Lake, Wisconsin	August 17	(Italy) Rino Mastronardi	(United States) Rocky Moran Jr.	(Italy) Rino Mastronardi
10	Mazda Raceway Laguna Seca	(United States) Monterey County, California	September 7	(United States) Chris Menninga	(United States) Chris Menninga	(Italy) Rino Mastronardi
11	Reno Grand Prix	(United States) Reno, Nevada	October 19	(Italy) Rino Mastronardi	(Italy) Rino Mastronardi	(United States) Derek Hill
12	Mazda Raceway Laguna Seca	(United States) Monterey County, California	October 26	(Italy) Rino Mastronardi	(France) Nicolas Rondet	(United States) Chris Menninga

== Final standings ==
Color	Result
Gold	Winner
Silver	2nd place
Bronze	3rd place
Green	4th & 5th place
Light Blue	6th–10th place
Dark Blue	11th place or lower
Purple	Did not finish
Red	Did not qualify (DNQ)
Brown	Withdrawn (Wth)
Black	Disqualified (DSQ)
White	Did not start (DNS)
Blank	Did not participate (DNP)
Blank	Driver replacement (Rpl)
Blank	Injured (Inj)
Blank	No race held (NH)

Rank	Driver	(United States) STP	(United States) SEB	(United States) SAV	(United States) LRP	(United States) MOH	(United States) WGI	(United States) MIN	(United States) MOH	(United States) ROA	(United States) LAG	(United States) REN	(United States) LAG	Points
1	(United States) Derek Hill	25	1	1	2	1	3	7	3	26	3	1	9	157
2	(Italy) Rino Mastronardi	1	3	2	1	4	1	17	26	1	1	18	27	147
3	(United States) Andy Boss	3	9	22	3	5	25	2	1	2	5	2	6	135
4	(United States) Chris Menninga	6	7	20	5	3	2	6	5	4	2	22	1	130
5	(France) Nicolas Rondet	28	4	10	4	8	9	1	2	5	4	4	3	125
6	(United States) Rocky Moran Jr.	7	5	3	27	7	8	5	25	3	8	23	2	100
7	(Norway) Martin Stenshorne	29	8	4	23	28	5	25	4	27	6	3	23	67
8	(United States) Will Langhorne	18	12	8	6	27	7	19	10	7	24	8	12	58
9	(Lebanon) Samer Hindi	5	19	12	11	14	26	16	15	8	11	5	8	55
10	(United States) Tony Renna	27	2	7	24	2	4	18					22	54
11	(United States) G. J. Mennen	2	13	9	8	21	11	13	8	12	17			54
12	(Puerto Rico) Victor Gonzalez Jr.	4	29	6	18	15	13	24	6	28	12	6	15	51
13	(Italy) Giovanni Gulinelli			5	10	12	12	3	23	9				46
14	(United States) Scott Brunk	10	11	28	9	17	27	24	11		9	9	14	38
15	(United States) Eric Tresslar	14	16	13	13	19	17	10	11	10	10	10	24	38
	(Sweden) Mattias Anderson	16	10	23	12	10								
	(United States) Barry Atkins			18	22	24								
	(United States) Townsend Bell									18			4	
	(Portugal) Bruno Correia										28	21		
	(United States) Jarrett Boon	8	15	11	14	13	15	20	22	13	27	11	16	
	(United States) Randy Bryan								19					
	(France) Sebastien Carcone			26	20	22								
	(Peru) Jose Antonio Costa								7	6	14	7	11	
	(United States) Patsy DiFilippo	19	27	25	23	24	26	20		23	23	16	20	
	(United States) Mike Durand				17	20	28							
	(United States) Sean Patrick Flanery			29					17		18			
	(United States) Jon Fogarty								12	14	16	20	7	
	(United States) Matt Fowler	17	25	16	16									
	(Norway) Jarle Gåsland	21	28	21	25	6	6	23						
	(United States) Tim Goetze											15	17	
	(United States) Mark-Paul Gosselaar						22	12	16					
	(United States) Kip Gulseth									19				
	(Norway) Andre Hansen	22	20											
	(United States) Randy Harris										13			
	(United States) Ryan Jones												18	
	(United States) Denis Lay	20	18	17	19			22			20			
	(United States) Scott Mayer									25	25			
	(Canada) John McCaig	15	21	14	26	11	18	4		20	26	17	25	
	(United States) Jamie Menninga					16				17			13	
	(United States) Jared O'Malley											12		
	(United States) Nick O'Sullivan	13	14											
	(Argentina) Jose Luis Di Palma								14	16				
	(Brazil) Gustavo Pasetto	12	24											
	(Brazil) William Peetz							21	21		19			
	(United States) Steve Pelke									22				
	(Monaco) Gian-Maria Regazzoni	11	17											
	(United States) Joshua Rehm					26	19							
	(United States) Alfonso Ribeiro					18	14	8				19		
	(United States) Steven Rikert	26	6	24	7	9	16							
	(United States) Matt Robinson							15	9	15	22			
	(Mexico) Memo Rojas										15			
	(Brazil) Nilton Rossoni												26	
	(United States) Charlie Schaitberger							14						
	(United States) Jeff Shafer												5	
	(United States) Jeff Simmons			27			10				7			
	(United States) Craig Sletten		26						27	24				
	(United States) Bill Tichenor	24	22	15	15	25	21	9	13			13	19	
	(United States) Owen Trinkler												10	
	(United States) Keith Watts	9												
	(United States) Charles Willis	23	23	19	21	20	23	11		21	21	14	21	
