= 1995 Barber Dodge Pro Series =

1995 Barber Dodge Pro Series season

Seasons
- ← 1994 1996 →

The 1995 Barber Dodge Pro Series season was the eleventh season of the series. Dodge replaced Saab as the series engine provider. 1995 was also the first season the series was sanctioned by SCCA Pro Racing. All drivers used Dodge powered Goodyear shod Mondiale chassis. South African Jaki Scheckter won the championship.

== Race calendar and results ==
Round	Circuit	Location	Date	Winner
1	Bicentennial Park	(United States) Miami, Florida	March 3	(United States) Geoff Boss
2	Sebring International Raceway	(United States) Sebring, Florida	March 18	(United States) Barry Waddell
3	Phoenix International Raceway	(United States) Phoenix, Arizona	May 6	(United States) Geoff Boss
4	Lime Rock Park	(United States) Lime Rock, Connecticut	May 29	(United States) Barry Waddell
5	Watkins Glen International	(United States) Watkins Glen, New York	June 25	(South Africa) Jaki Scheckter
6	Road America	(United States) Elkhart Lake, Wisconsin	July 8	(South Africa) Jaki Scheckter
7	Road America	(United States) Elkhart Lake, Wisconsin	July 9	(South Africa) Jaki Scheckter
8	Sonoma Raceway	(United States) Sonoma, California	July 16	(United States) Geoff Boss
9	Mid-Ohio Sports Car Course	(United States) Lexington, Ohio	August 13	(United States) Jeff Bucknum
10	New Hampshire Motor Speedway	(United States) Loudon, New Hampshire	August 20	(United States) Jerry Nadeau
11	Texas World Speedway^{1}	(United States) College Station, Texas	September 10	(Sweden) Fredrik Larsson
12	New Orleans street circuit	(United States) New Orleans, Louisiana	October 8	(United States) Jerry Nadeau

=== Notes ===
^1 The Barber Dodge Pro Series would support the Trans-Am Series at the Dallas Grand Prix. But SCCA Pro Racing canceled the 1995 running of the Grand Prix. The Barber Dodge Pro Series race was moved to Texas World Speedway to support the IMSA GT Championship.

== Final standings ==
Color	Result
Gold	Winner
Silver	2nd place
Bronze	3rd place
Green	4th & 5th place
Light Blue	6th–10th place
Dark Blue	11th place or lower
Purple	Did not finish
Red	Did not qualify (DNQ)
Brown	Withdrawn (Wth)
Black	Disqualified (DSQ)
White	Did not start (DNS)
Blank	Did not participate (DNP)
Blank	Driver replacement (Rpl)
Blank	Injured (Inj)
Blank	No race held (NH)

Rank	Driver	(United States) BIC	(United States) SEB	(United States) PIR	(United States) LRP	(United States) WGI	(United States) ROA1	(United States) ROA2	(United States) SON	(United States) MOH	(United States) NHS	(United States) TWS	(United States) NOR	Points
1	(South Africa) Jaki Scheckter	2	3	2		1	1	1	7	15	3	7	2	154
2	(United States) Geoff Boss	1	5	1	2	3	18		1	3	4	8	11	147
3	(United States) Barry Waddell	3	1	3	1	4	4		3	3	7	5	8	141
4	(United States) Tim Moser	6	13	18		5	3		2	2	2	10	21	112
5	(Sweden) Fredrik Larsson	21	9	14	3	2	2		16	6	8	1	7	105
6	(Sweden) Mattias Andersson	11	6	6	5	16	8		8	9	12	2	5	99
7	(Norway) Thomas Schie	22	24	10		22	7		5	4	7	3	3	91
8	(United States) Jeff Willoughby	8	2	8		10	5		11	12	5			82
9	(United States) Chris Menninga	16	16	9		6	6		4	8	6	4	19	74
10	(United States) Jeff Bucknum			4		21	10		6	1	10			63
11	(Colombia) Andres Gomez	10	21	12		11	21		9	19	15	6	4	61
12	(United States) Skip Streets	14	26	11		23	12		10	10	11	11	6	46
13	(United States) Jerry Nadeau										1		1	42
14	(Argentina) Leandro Larossa	13	14	17		8	22		13	16	13	9	10	39
15	(Brazil) Albert Spinola	7	4	23	4	19	23							32
	(United States) Barry Atkins					17						14		
	(United States) Mark Baker	18	17	21		13	13		18	13	14			
	(United States) Andy Boss	5	27	15										
	(United States) Cary Capparelli												15	
	(United States) Jarrett Boon												14	
	(United States) Greg Borland		12											
	(South Africa) Richard Brunt			25										
	(United States) Tom Cormack		7				14							
	(Portugal) Mike De Jesus					15								
	(United States) Patsy DeFillipo												18	
	(United States) Joaquin DeSoto	17												
	(Paraguay) Diego Dominguez	24	19	7		7	19							
	(United States) Richard Doty			20										
	(Switzerland) Christian Fisher	27	25	26										
	(United States) George Frazier												13	
	(United Kingdom) Divina Galica									14				
	(United Kingdom) Nigel Greensall	12												
	(Italy) Giovanni Gulinelli			13			11		12				9	
	(Colombia) Nessim Kassem	15	20	27										
	(United States) Nick Kunewalder	25												
	(United States) Mike Lee					18								
	(United States) Peter MacLeod	19	10											
	(Canada) Chris McDougall			5			9							
	(United States) G.J. Mennen										16			
	(United States) Will Pace	28				12	15						12	
	(United States) Leo Parente						20							
	(United States) David Pendergraph										21	13		
	(United States) Jon Purdy											12		
	(Colombia) Hernando Ramirez	9	8	16										
	(United States) Tony Renna		15			20							17	
	(United States) Frank Sabatine										22			
	(United States) Ted Sahley									18				
	(Portugal) Francisco Sande e Castro										18			
	(United States) Stephen Sardelli	26	23	19		14	17		14		17			
	(United States) Craig Sletten						16							
	(United Kingdom) Jamie Spence	4	22											
	(United States) Curtis Spicer	23	18											
	(United States) Jerry Tack										20			
	(United States) Joe Vantreese								15	17	19	16		
	(United States) Larry Vollum			22										
	(United States) John Walzinger												16	
	(United States) Pete Wise									11				
	(El Salvador) Edgar Zamora	20	11	24		9								
	(United States) Luis Zervignon								17	5		15	20	
