= 2000 Indy Lights season =

- Dayton Indy Lights Championship

Season
- Races: 12
- Start date: April 16
- End date: October 29

Awards
- Drivers' champion: (New Zealand) Scott Dixon

The 2000 Indy Lights season (more commonly known as the 2000 CART Dayton Indy Lights Championship) was the 15th season of Indy Lights. The season consisted of 12 races with all of the races being supporter races for the 2000 CART season. The season would be dominated by Kiwi driver, Scott Dixon who captured six race victories to win the championship by nine points over American driver, Townsend Bell with Casey Mears coming in third.

All teams used the Lola T97/20-Buick spec car.

The scoring system was 20-16-14-12-10-8-6-5-4-3-2-1 points awarded to the first 12 (twelve) finishers, with 1 (one) extra point given to the driver who took pole-position, and another extra point given to the driver who led most laps in the race.

== Team and driver chart ==
The following drivers and teams competed in the series:

Team	No.	Drivers	Round(s)
Brian Stewart Racing	8	(France) Soheil Ayari	1
Brian Stewart Racing	9	(United States) Todd Snyder	1–6
Brian Stewart Racing	10	(Mexico) Rodolfo Lavín	All
Conquest Racing	11	(United States) Chris Menninga	All
Conquest Racing	21	(Brazil) Felipe Giaffone	All
Conquest Racing	40	(Mexico) Rolando Quintanilla	All
Dorricott Racing	1	(United States) Townsend Bell	All
Dorricott Racing	2	(United States) Casey Mears	All
Dorricott Racing	3	(Australia) Jason Bright	All
Dorricott Racing	3	(Republic of Ireland) Derek Higgins	6
Genoa Racing	36	(Argentina) Waldemar Coronas	9
Genoa Racing	61	(United States) Cory Witherill	1–6, 10, 12
Lucas Motorsports	4	(United States) Geoff Boss	All
Lucas Motorsports	5	(United States) Andy Boss	All
Mexpro Racing	15	(Mexico) Rudy Junco Jr.	All
Mexpro Racing	16	(Republic of Ireland) Derek Higgins	7–9, 11–12
PacWest Lights	17	(New Zealand) Scott Dixon	All
PacWest Lights	18	(United States) Tony Renna	All
Team KOOL Green	26	(United States) Jeff Simmons	All
Team KOOL Green	27	(United Kingdom) Jonny Kane	All
Team México Quaker Herdez	7	(Mexico) Mario Domínguez	All
Team México Quaker Herdez	78	(Mexico) Luis Díaz	1–9, 11–12

== Schedule ==
Rd.	Date	Track	Location
1	April 16	R Long Beach Street Circuit	Long Beach, California
2	June 5	O Milwaukee Mile	West Allis, Wisconsin
3	June 18	R The Raceway at Belle Isle Park	Detroit, Michigan
4	June 25	R Portland International Raceway	Portland, Oregon
5	July 22	O Michigan International Speedway	Brooklyn, Michigan
6	July 30	O Chicago Motor Speedway	Cicero, Illinois
7	August 13	R Mid-Ohio Sports Car Course	Lexington, Ohio
8	September 3	R Concord Pacific Place	Vancouver, British Columbia
9	September 10	R Laguna Seca Raceway	Monterey, California
10	September 17	O Gateway International Raceway	Madison, Illinois
11	October 1	R George R. Brown Convention Center	Houston, Texas
12	October 29	O California Speedway	Fontana, California

== Race results ==
Round	Circuit	Pole position	Fastest lap	Most laps led	Race Winner	
Round	Circuit	Pole position	Fastest lap	Most laps led	Driver	Team
1	(United States) Long Beach Street Circuit	(United Kingdom) Jonny Kane	(United Kingdom) Jonny Kane	(United Kingdom) Jonny Kane	(New Zealand) Scott Dixon	PacWest Lights
2	(United States) Milwaukee Mile	(New Zealand) Scott Dixon	(New Zealand) Scott Dixon	(New Zealand) Scott Dixon	(New Zealand) Scott Dixon	PacWest Lights
3	(United States) The Raceway at Belle Isle Park	(United Kingdom) Jonny Kane	(United Kingdom) Jonny Kane	(United Kingdom) Jonny Kane	(United Kingdom) Jonny Kane	Team KOOL Green
4	(United States) Portland International Raceway	(United States) Townsend Bell	(New Zealand) Scott Dixon	(Australia) Jason Bright	(Australia) Jason Bright	Dorricott Racing
5	(United States) Michigan International Speedway	(Brazil) Felipe Giaffone	(Australia) Jason Bright	(Brazil) Felipe Giaffone	(Brazil) Felipe Giaffone	Conquest Racing
6	(United States) Chicago Motor Speedway	(United States) Chris Menninga	(New Zealand) Scott Dixon	(New Zealand) Scott Dixon	(New Zealand) Scott Dixon	PacWest Lights
7	(United States) Mid-Ohio Sports Car Course	(Australia) Jason Bright	(United States) Casey Mears	(United States) Townsend Bell	(United States) Townsend Bell	Dorricott Racing
8	(Canada) Concord Pacific Place	(Brazil) Felipe Giaffone	(New Zealand) Scott Dixon	(Brazil) Felipe Giaffone	(New Zealand) Scott Dixon	PacWest Lights
9	(United States) Laguna Seca Raceway	(United States) Casey Mears	(New Zealand) Scott Dixon	(New Zealand) Scott Dixon	(New Zealand) Scott Dixon	PacWest Lights
10	(United States) Gateway International Raceway	(United States) Townsend Bell	(United States) Townsend Bell	(United States) Townsend Bell	(United States) Townsend Bell	Dorricott Racing
11	(United States) George R. Brown Convention Center	(United States) Casey Mears	(United States) Casey Mears	(United States) Casey Mears	(United States) Casey Mears	Dorricott Racing
12	(United States) California Speedway	(Brazil) Felipe Giaffone	(United States) Cory Witherill	(New Zealand) Scott Dixon	(New Zealand) Scott Dixon	PacWest Lights

== Race summaries ==
=== Long Beach race ===
Held April 16 at Long Beach, California Street Course. Jonny Kane won the pole.

Top Five Results

1. 17- Scott Dixon
2. 3- Jason Bright
3. 21- Felipe Giaffone
4. 26- Jeff Simmons
5. 2- Casey Mears

=== Milwaukee race ===
Held June 5 at The Milwaukee Mile. Scott Dixon won the pole.

Top Five Results

1. 17- Scott Dixon
2. 3- Jason Bright
3. 7- Mario Domínguez
4. 11- Chris Menninga
5. 2- Casey Mears

=== Detroit race ===
Held June 18 at Belle Isle Raceway. Jonny Kane won the pole.

Top Five Results

1. 27- Jonny Kane
2. 21- Felipe Giaffone
3. 2- Casey Mears
4. 17- Scott Dixon
5. 7- Mario Domínguez

=== Portland race ===
Held June 25 at Portland International Raceway. Townsend Bell won the pole.

Top Five Results

1. 3- Jason Bright
2. 1- Townsend Bell
3. 26- Jeff Simmons
4. 18- Tony Renna
5. 11- Chris Menninga

=== Michigan race ===
Held July 22 at Michigan International Speedway. Felipe Giaffone won the pole.

Top Five Results

1. 21- Felipe Giaffone
2. 2- Casey Mears
3. 18- Tony Renna
4. 1- Townsend Bell
5. 9- Todd Snyder

=== Chicago race ===
Held July 30 at The Chicago Motor Speedway. Chris Menninga won the pole.

Top Five Results

1. 17- Scott Dixon
2. 1- Townsend Bell
3. 18- Tony Renna
4. 21- Felipe Giaffone
5. 10- Rodolfo Lavín, Jr.

=== Mid-Ohio race ===
Held August 13 at The Mid-Ohio Sports Car Course. Jason Bright won the pole.

Top Five Results

1. 1- Townsend Bell
2. 17- Scott Dixon
3. 3- Jason Bright
4. 18- Tony Renna
5. 2- Casey Mears

=== Vancouver race ===
Held September 3 at Pacific Place. Felipe Giaffone won the pole.

Top Five Results

1. 17- Scott Dixon
2. 21- Felipe Giaffone
3. 26- Jeff Simmons
4. 1- Townsend Bell
5. 7- Mario Domínguez

=== Laguna Seca race ===
Held September 10 at Mazda Raceway Laguna Seca. Casey Mears won the pole.

Top Five Results

1. 17- Scott Dixon
2. 1- Casey Mears
3. 26- Jeff Simmons
4. 18- Tony Renna
5. 27- Jonny Kane

=== Gateway race ===
Held September 17 at The Gateway International Raceway. Townsend Bell won the pole.

Top Five Results

1. 1- Townsend Bell
2. 2- Casey Mears
3. 3- Jason Bright
4. 18- Tony Renna
5. 11- Chris Menninga

=== Houston race ===
Held October 1 at The Houston Street Circuit. Casey Mears won the pole.

Top Five Results

1. 2- Casey Mears
2. 1- Townsend Bell
3. 21- Felipe Giaffone
4. 4- Geoff Boss
5. 11- Chris Menninga

=== Fontana race ===
Held October 29 at The California Speedway. Felipe Giaffone won the pole.

Top Five Results

1. 17- Scott Dixon
2. 1- Townsend Bell
3. 18- Tony Renna
4. 2- Casey Mears
5. 10- Rodolfo Lavín, Jr.

== Championship standings ==
=== Drivers' championship ===
Scoring system

Position	**1st**	**2nd**	**3rd**	**4th**	**5th**	**6th**	**7th**	**8th**	**9th**	**10th**	**11th**	**12th**
Points	20	16	14	12	10	8	6	5	4	3	2	1

- The driver who qualifies on pole is awarded one additional point.
- An additional point is awarded to the driver who leads the most laps in a race.

Pos	Driver	LBH (United States)	MIL (United States)	DET (United States)	POR (United States)	MIC (United States)	CHI (United States)	MOH (United States)	VAN (Canada)	LAG (United States)	GAT (United States)	HOU (United States)	FON (United States)	Points
1	(New Zealand) Scott Dixon	1	**1***	4	11	14	1*	2	1	1*	15	15	1*	155
2	(United States) Townsend Bell	17	6	7	**2**	4	2	1*	4	18	**1***	2	2	146
3	(United States) Casey Mears	5	5	3	7	2	10	5	8	**2**	2	**1***	4	141
4	(Brazil) Felipe Giaffone	3	12	2	14	**1***	4	13	**2***	6	7	3	**7**	118
5	(United States) Tony Renna	9	17	17	4	3	3	4	6	4	4	10	3	105
6	(Australia) Jason Bright	2	2	18	1*	9	Wth	**3**	14	8	3	16	14	90
7	(United States) Jeff Simmons	4	7	9	3	15	7	6	3	3	14	11	6	88
8	(Mexico) Mario Domínguez	10	3	5	6	7	11	11	5	10	6	12	16	67
9	(United States) Chris Menninga	11	4	6	5	18	**9**	14	17	13	5	5	9	61
10	(United Kingdom) Jonny Kane	**6***	16	**1***	17	17	DNS	10	15	5	9	13	10	52
11	(Mexico) Rodolfo Lavín	7	8	13	12	16	5	17	10	16	8	6	5	48
12	(United States) Geoff Boss	8	11	11	9	6	12	8	11	12	12	4	DNS	43
13	(Mexico) Luis Díaz	12	10	14	8	12	6	16	12	7		7	15	31
14	(Mexico) Rudy Junco Jr.	18	9	12	10	13	8	15	9	11	11	17	8	26
15	(United States) Andy Boss	13	14	10	13	10	15	9	16	9	13	9	12	20
16	(Mexico) Rolando Quintanilla	14	Wth	16	16	8	17	12	13	17	10	8	11	16
17	(United States) Todd Snyder	15	15	8	18	5	16							15
18	(Republic of Ireland) Derek Higgins						13	7	7	14		14	17	12
19	(United States) Cory Witherill	19	13	15	15	11	14				DNS		13	2
20	(Argentina) Waldemar Coronas									15				0
21	(France) Soheil Ayari	16												0
Pos	Driver	LBH (United States)	MIL (United States)	DET (United States)	POR (United States)	MIC (United States)	CHI (United States)	MOH (United States)	VAN (Canada)	LAG (United States)	GAT (United States)	HOU (United States)	FON (United States)	Points

Color	Result
Gold	Winner
Silver	2nd place
Bronze	3rd place
Green	4th & 5th place
Light Blue	6th–10th place
Dark Blue	Finished (Outside Top 10)
Purple	Did not finish
Red	Did not qualify (DNQ)
Brown	Withdrawn (Wth)
Black	Disqualified (DSQ)
White	Did not start (DNS)
Blank	Did not participate (DNP)
Blank	Not competing

**In-line notation**
**Bold**	Pole position (1 point)
Italics	Ran fastest race lap
*	Led most race laps (1 point)
^{1}	Qualifying cancelled no bonus point awarded

- Ties in points broken by number of wins, or best finishes.
