= List of IndyCar Series teams =

The following is a list of the teams that currently compete or used to compete in the NTT IndyCar Series.

== Current full-time teams ==
Team	No.	Primary Sponsor	Driver(s)	Listed Owner(s)	Engine
A. J. Foyt Racing	4	TBA	(United States) Josh Pierson	(United States) A. J. Foyt	Chevrolet
A. J. Foyt Racing	14	TBA	(Norway) Dennis Hauger	(United States) A. J. Foyt	Chevrolet
Andretti Global	26	zone	(Australia) Will Power	(United States) Dan Towriss (United States) Mark Walter	Honda
Andretti Global	27	JM Bullion; Sam's Club	(United States) Kyle Kirkwood	(United States) Dan Towriss (United States) Mark Walter	Honda
Andretti Global	28	Delaware Life	(Sweden) Marcus Ericsson	(United States) Dan Towriss (United States) Mark Walter	Honda
Arrow McLaren	5	Arrow Electronics; Velo	(Mexico) Patricio O'Ward	(United Kingdom) McLaren (United States) Sam Schmidt (Canada) Ric Peterson	Chevrolet
Arrow McLaren	6	Arrow Electronics; NTT Data	(New Zealand) Scott Dixon	(United Kingdom) McLaren (United States) Sam Schmidt (Canada) Ric Peterson	Chevrolet
Arrow McLaren	7	Arrow Electronics; Velo	(Sweden) Felix Rosenqvist	(United Kingdom) McLaren (United States) Sam Schmidt (Canada) Ric Peterson	Chevrolet
Arrow McLaren	31	PrizePicks	(United States) Ryan Hunter-Reay 1	(United Kingdom) McLaren (United States) Sam Schmidt (Canada) Ric Peterson	Chevrolet
Chip Ganassi Racing	8	Sunoco	(Cayman Islands) Kyffin Simpson	(United States) Chip Ganassi	Honda
Chip Ganassi Racing	9	PNC Bank	(Denmark) Christian Lundgaard	(United States) Chip Ganassi	Honda
Chip Ganassi Racing	10	OpenAI	(Spain) Álex Palou	(United States) Chip Ganassi	Honda
Dale Coyne Racing	18	TBA	TBA	(United States) Dale Coyne	Honda
Dale Coyne Racing	19	TBA	(United States) Nikita Johnson	(United States) Dale Coyne	Honda
Dreyer & Reinbold Racing	24	Kingspan; ARCO	(United States) Conor Daly	Vacant	Honda
Ed Carpenter Racing	20	Java House	(United States) Alexander Rossi	(United States) Ed Carpenter (United States) Ted Gelov	Chevrolet
Ed Carpenter Racing	21	Splenda	(Denmark) Christian Rasmussen	(United States) Ed Carpenter (United States) Ted Gelov	Chevrolet
Ed Carpenter Racing	33	SlimFast	(United States) Ed Carpenter 1	(United States) Ed Carpenter (United States) Ted Gelov	Chevrolet
Juncos Hollinger Racing	76	TBA	TBA	(Argentina) Ricardo Juncos (United States) Brad Hollinger	Chevrolet
Juncos Hollinger Racing	77	TBA	TBA	(Argentina) Ricardo Juncos (United States) Brad Hollinger	Chevrolet
Meyer Shank Racing	06	Cliffs	(Brazil) Hélio Castroneves 1	(United States) Mike Shank (United States) Jim Meyer (United States) Liberty Media (Brazil) Hélio Castroneves	Honda
Meyer Shank Racing	60	SiriusXM	(New Zealand) Marcus Armstrong	(United States) Mike Shank (United States) Jim Meyer (United States) Liberty Media (Brazil) Hélio Castroneves	Honda
Meyer Shank Racing	66	Root	(Germany) Mick Schumacher	(United States) Mike Shank (United States) Jim Meyer (United States) Liberty Media (Brazil) Hélio Castroneves	Honda
Rahal Letterman Lanigan Racing	15	United Rentals; Fifth Third Bank	(United States) Graham Rahal	(United States) Bobby Rahal (United States) David Letterman (United States) Mike Lanigan	Honda
Rahal Letterman Lanigan Racing	45	Droplight	(United Kingdom) Louis Foster	(United States) Bobby Rahal (United States) David Letterman (United States) Mike Lanigan	Honda
Team Penske	2	Shell; Astemo; PPG	(United States) Josef Newgarden	(United States) Roger Penske	Chevrolet
Team Penske	3	Pennzoil; Odyssey Battery	(New Zealand) Scott McLaughlin	(United States) Roger Penske	Chevrolet
Team Penske	12	Verizon	(United States) David Malukas	(United States) Roger Penske	Chevrolet

== Current part-time teams ==
Team	No.	Primary Sponsor	Driver(s)	Listed Owner(s)	Engine
Abel Motorsports	51	Texas Roadhouse	(United States) Jacob Abel 1	(United States) Bill Abel	Chevrolet
HMD Motorsports w/ A. J. Foyt Racing	11	e.l.f.	(United Kingdom) Katherine Legge 1	(Lithuania) Henry Malukas	Chevrolet

== List of defunct IndyCar teams (1996–present) ==
Key: Races Entered = Number of individual races entered; Races Started = Number of individual races started; Drivers = Number of drivers; Total Entries = Total number of race entries; Wins = Number of races won; Poles = Number of pole positions; Podiums. = Number of podium finishes

Team	Seasons	RE	RS	D	TE	W	Pol	Pod	Best Indy 500 Result	First race	First win	Last win	Last race	Successor
Access Motorsports	2003-2004	29	28	2	29	0	0	0	8th (2003)	2003 Indianapolis 500	n/a	n/a	2004 Texas 2	None
American Dream Motorsports	2005-2008	4	3	4	7	0	0	0	16th (Multiple)	2005 Indianapolis 500	n/a	n/a	2008 Indianapolis 500	None
Beck Motorsports	1996-1996/97; 1999-2009 (Note: 2001, 2004-2009: In conjunction with Curb Agajanian Performance Group; 2006: In conjunction with Team Leader Motorsports.)	63	58	13	67	0	1	2	8th (1996)	1996 Walt Disney World	n/a	n/a	2009 Homestead	None
Bradley Motorsports	1996-2002	67	67	2	67	1	0	3	10th (1998)	1996 Walt Disney World			2002 Texas 2	None
Bryan Herta Autosport	2010-2015	69	68	7	69	1	1	2	1st (2011)	2010 Indianapolis 500	2011 Indianapolis 500		2015 Sonoma	Andretti Autosport
Cahill Racing	1998-2002	32	31	3	34	0	0	1	11th (2001)	1998 Indianapolis 500	n/a	n/a	2002 Indianapolis 500	None
Carlin	2018-2021	99	97	6	99	0	1	0	17th (2020)	2018 St. Petersburg	n/a	n/a	2021 Long Beach	None (Sold assets to Juncos Hollinger Racing)
CFH Racing	2015	16	16	4	34	2	1	5	8th (2015)	2015 St. Petersburg	2015 Barber	2015 Toronto	2015 Sonoma	Ed Carpenter Racing
Chastain Motorsports	1996/97-1998; 2007	21	21	2	22	0	0	1	17th (1998)	1996 New Hampshire	n/a	n/a	2007 Indianapolis 500	None
Cheever Racing	1996/97-2006	125	125	14	187	6	4	17	1st (1998)	1996 New Hampshire	1997 Walt Disney World	2002 Michigan	2006 Kansas	None
Citrone/Buhl Autosport	2020	2	2	1	2	0	0	0	24th (2020) (as co-owners)	2020 IndyCar Grand Prix	n/a	n/a	2020 Indianapolis 500	None
Conquest Racing	2002; 2008–2011	75	74	17	111	0	0	1	11th (2009)	2002 Homestead	n/a	n/a	2011 Kentucky	None
Clauson-Marshall Racing	2019	1	1	1	1	0	0	0	16th (2019)	2019 Indianapolis 500	n/a	n/a	2019 Indianapolis 500	None
Cusick Motorsports	2021-2022; 2024-2025 (Note: In each year of its existence, Cusick would partner with another team. 2021: Andretti Autosport; 2022: DragonSpeed; 2024-2025: Dreyer & Reinbold Racing.)	4	4	4	6	0	0	0	10th (2024)	2021 Indianapolis 500	n/a	n/a	2025 Indianapolis 500	None
Curb Agajanian Performance Group	2001-2011; 2016 (Note: In each year of its existence, CAPG would partner with another team. 2001 and 2004-2009: Beck Motorsports; 2002: Billy Boat; 2003: Sam Schmidt Motorsports; 2006: Team Leader Motorsports; 2010: KV Racing Technology; 2011: Bryan Herta Autosport; 2016: Andretti Autosport.)	47	44	11	51	2	1	3	1st (Twice as co-owners)	2001 Phoenix	2011 Indianapolis 500 (As co-owner)	2016 Indianapolis 500 (As co-owner)		Andretti Autosport
Della Penna Motorsports	1996-1996/97	5	5	2	6	1	1	2	3rd (1996)	1996 Walt Disney World	1996 Las Vegas			Blair Racing
DragonSpeed	2019-2020, 2022	5	5	2	5	0	0	0	23rd (2020)	2019 St. Petersburg	n/a	n/a	2022 Indianapolis 500	None (Sold assets to Meyer Shank Racing)
Dragon Racing	2007-2013	82	81	11	94	0	0	3	5th (2007)	2007 Indianapolis 500	n/a	n/a	2013 Fontana	None
EuroInternational	1996/97	3	2	1	3	0	0	0	22nd (1997)	1997 Phoenix	n/a	n/a	1997 Texas	None
Fan Force United	2012	1	1	1	1	0	0	0	33rd (2012)	2012 Indianapolis 500	n/a	n/a	2012 Indianapolis 500	Lazier Partners Racing
FAZZT Race Team	2010	17	17	2	18	0	0	0	10th (2010)	2010 São Paulo	n/a	n/a	2010 Homestead	Sam Schmidt Motorsports
Fernández Racing	2004-2006	47	47	3	94	4	0	6	7th (Multiple)	2004 Homestead	2004 Kentucky	2005 Kentucky	2006 Chicagoland	None
Galles Racing	1996-2001	42	42	8	61	2	1	7	2nd (1996)	1996 Indianapolis 500	2000 Las Vegas	2001 Gateway	2001 Texas 2	None
Hemelgarn Racing	1996-2009	108	107	13	133	8	2	18	1st (1996)	1996 Walt Disney World	1996 Indianapolis 500	2001 Kentucky	2009 Indianapolis 500	None
HVM Racing	2008-2012	66	64	6	74	0	0	0	14th (2010)	2008 Homestead	n/a	n/a	2012 Fontana	None
Indy Regency Racing	2000-2002	6	6	3	6	0	0	0	19th (2001)	2000 Indianapolis 500	n/a	n/a	2002 Texas II	None
ISM Racing	1996/97-1998	21	20	5	27	0	0	6	3rd (Multiple)	1997 Walt Disney World	n/a	n/a	1999 Atlanta	None
Jonathan Byrd's Racing	1996-2001; 2005; 2015-2016 (Note: 1996: Ran in conjunction with both Cunningham Racing and Treadway Racing. 1996/97-1999: Ran as Byrd-Cunningham Racing. 2000: In conjunction with McCormack Motorsports. 2001: In conjunction with Team Xtreme Racing. 2005: In conjunction with Panther Racing. 2015: With support from KV Racing Technology. 2016: With support from Dale Coyne Racing.)	42	40	14	51	2	1	4	5th (2005)	1996 Walt Disney World	1996 Phoenix	1998 Texas 2	2016 Indianapolis 500	None
Kelley Racing	1996/97-2004	96	96	5	176	9	8	19	7th (2003)	1997 Indianapolis 500	1998 Phoenix	2003 Texas 1	2004 Texas 2	Vision Racing
KV Racing Technology	2008-2016	153	153	16	336	6	3	19	1st (2013)	2008 Homestead	2008 Long Beach	2016 Detroit 1	2016 Sonoma	Juncos Racing
Lazier Partners Racing	2013-2017	5	5	1	5	0	0	0	29th (2017)	2013 Indianapolis 500	n/a	n/a	2017 Indianapolis 500	Top Gun Racing
Luyendyk Racing	2006	1	1	1	1	0	0	0	28th (2006)	2006 Indianapolis 500	n/a	n/a	2006 Indianapolis 500	None
McCormack Motorsports	1996-1999; 2001; 2000 (Note: In conjunction with Jonathan Byrd's Racing.)	47	44	14	50	0	0	0	9th (1997)	1996 Indianapolis 500	n/a	n/a	2001 Texas 1	None
Team Menard	1996-2003	86	84	13	115	10	21	20	4th (1999)	1996 Walt Disney World	1997 Pikes Peak	2001 Chicagoland	2003 Texas 2	Panther Racing
Mo Nunn Racing	2002-2004	37	37	6	67	2	0	9	3rd (2002)	2002 Homestead	2002 Kentucky	2003 Michigan	2004 Texas 2	None
Newman/Haas Racing	2004-2011	71	71	9	127	2	1	8	5th (2004)	2004 Indianapolis 500	2008 St. Petersburg	2008 Detroit	2011 Kentucky	Fan Force United
Pacific Coast Motorsports	2008	8	7	2	9	0	0	1	DNQ	2008 Long Beach	n/a	n/a	2008 Sonoma	None
Pagan Racing	1996-2000	28	28	5	30	0	0	2	2nd (1999)	1996 Walt Disney World	n/a	n/a	2000 Indianapolis 500	None
Panther Racing	1998-2013	241	241	22	314	15	7	49	2nd (2008, 2009, 2010, 2011)	1998 Walt Disney World	1999 Phoenix	2005 Texas	2013 Fontana	KV Racing Technology
Paretta Autosport	2021-2022	5	5	1	5	0	0	0	31st (2021)	2021 Indianapolis 500	n/a	n/a	2022 Monterey Grand Prix	None
Patrick Racing	2004	13	13	4	13	0	0	0	17th (2004)	2004 Indianapolis 500	n/a	n/a	2004 Texas 2	None
PDM Racing	1996-2007	50	47	16	53	0	0	1	12th (1998)	1996 Walt Disney World	n/a	n/a	2007 Indianapolis 500	None
Team Pelfrey	1998-2000	21	20	8	25	0	0	2	8th (Multiple)	1998 Indianapolis 500	n/a	n/a	2000 Texas 2	None
Pirtek Team Murray	2016	2	2	1	2	0	0	0	22nd (2016)	2016 Indy GP	n/a	n/a	2016 Indianapolis 500	None
Prema Racing	2025	17	17	2	34	0	1	0	26th (2025)	2025 St. Petersburg	n/a	n/a	2025 Nashville Superspeedway	None
Project Indy	1996-1996/97	4	3	2	5	0	0	0	33rd (1996)	1996 Phoenix	n/a	n/a	1996 Las Vegas 500K	None
Racing Professionals	2002; 2007	13	11	1	13	0	0	0	32nd (2007)	2001 Chicagoland	n/a	n/a	2007 Michigan	None
Robby Gordon Motorsports	2004	1	1	2	1	0	0	0	32nd (2004)	2004 Indianapolis 500	n/a	n/a	2004	None
Roth Racing	2004-2008	27	25	4	37	0	0	0	16th (2008)	2004 Indianapolis 500	n/a	n/a	2008 Chicagoland	FAZZT Race Team
SAMAX Motorsport	2007	7	7	1	7	0	0	0	31st (2007)	2007 Kansas	n/a	n/a	2007 Chicagoland	None
Sarah Fisher Hartman Racing	2008-2014	76	76	11	90	1	0	3	11th (2011)	2008 Indianapolis 500	2011 Kentucky		2014 Fontana	CFH Racing
Team Scandia	1996-1999	18	17	15	55	1	0	4	4th (1996)	1996 Walt Disney World	1997 Las Vegas		1999 Indianapolis 500	None
Team Leader Motorsports	2006 (Note: In conjunction with Curb-Agajanian-Beck Motorsports.); 2007	2	1	2	3	0	0	0	19th (1996)	2006 Indianapolis 500	n/a	n/a	2007 Indianapolis 500	None
Top Gun Racing	2021	2	1	1	2	0	0	0	DNQ (2021)	2021 Indianapolis 500	n/a	n/a	2021 Indy Road Course	Abel Motorsports
Treadway Racing	1996-2002	69	69	11	90	5	5	14	1st (1997)	1996 Walt Disney World	1996 Phoenix	1999 Las Vegas	2002 Texas 2	None
Vision Racing	2005-2009	83	83	9	159	0	0	4	5th (2008)	2005 Homestead	n/a	n/a	2009 Homestead	None
Walker Racing	1996; 2000–2001; 2008	24	24	4	24	0	0	2	20th (1996)	1996 Indianapolis 500	n/a	n/a	2008 Edmonton	Ed Carpenter Racing
Team Xtreme	1999-2001	33	33	5	45	0	0	1	8th (2001)	1999 Walt Disney World	n/a	n/a	2001 Texas 2	None
Team Coulson	1998-2002									1998 Indianapolis 500			2002 Indianapolis 500	Coulson/skyship Racing
Team	Seasons	RE	RS	D	TE	W	Pol	Pod	Best Indy 500 Result	First race	First win	Last win	Last race	Successor

== See also ==
- List of Champ Car teams
- List of IndyCar Series drivers
- List of Indycar races
- List of IndyCar Series racetracks
