= Tatuus =

Italian chassis manufacturer

Coordinates: 45.567207°N 9.046844°E

Tatuus Racing s.r.l.
- Type: Private
- Industry: Automotive
- Founded: 1980; 46 years ago
- Founder: Artico Sandonà
- Headquarters: Lainate, Italy
- Key people: Giovanni Delfino, CEO Gianfranco De Bellis, President
- Owner: TEC Racing
- Parent: Korus
- Website: http://www.tatuus.it/

Tatuus is an Italian chassis manufacturer founded in 1980. The company is specialized in formula cars, most notably Formula Renault, Formula Regional and Formula 4 chassis, but has also produced sports prototypes.

== History ==
Tatuus Racing SpA was founded in 1980 by Artico Sandonà, headquartered in Concorezzo. The company operated independently for 37 years, with Gianfranco De Bellis joining as a co-owner.

On 16 February 2017 De Bellis and Sandonà sold a majority of the shares to Wisequity IV, a closed-ended fund managed by private equity firm Wise Sgr S.p.A.

Under the ownership of Wise Sgr Tatuus expanded its operations. In November 2017 Tatuus purchased racing engine producer ATM-Autotecnica Motori. Autotecnica Motori founder Giovanni Delfino retained his role as CEO of the company and also moved into a role in senior management at Tatuus, later becoming CEO of the whole group. Another purchase was made in November 2018, when Tatuus bought a 75% stake in Breda Racing, a producer of autosport related equipment.

In May 2023, ownership of the group was acquired by the TEC Racing investment fund, with no changes in the senior management team. One year later, in the summer of 2024, the group completed the acquisition of YCOM. In 2025, the group further expanded with the addition of Next Solution Technologies, Birelart, IAME and Kart Republic, marking a major milestone in the history of the brands involved and a significant moment for the Italian motorsport landscape. Simultaneously, the holding company officially adopted the name Korus.

== Racecars ==
- Founded: 1980
- Former series: Formula Monza (1982-1989); Italian Formula 3 (1989-1995); Formula Renault Eurocup (1995-1999); French Formula Renault Championship (1995-1997); USF2000 (1997-1998)
- Noted drivers: (Italy) Fabrizio Bettini (1989-1990) (Italy) Rosario Parasiliti (1989) (Brazil) Niko Palhares (1991-1992) (Italy) Gianantonio Pacchioni (1993-1994) (Italy) Simone Rebai (1994) (Brazil) Tony Kanaan (1995) (Brazil) Enrique Bernoldi (1995-1996) (Italy) Rino Mastronardi (1995) (Norway) Tommy Rustad (1995) (Belgium) Jeffrey van Hooydonk (1997) (Italy) Max Busnelli (1997) (France) Bruno Besson (1998) (Brazil) Hoover Orsi (1998) (Brazil) Giuliano Losacco (1997-1998) (Italy) Gianmaria Bruni (1999) (Italy) Andrea de Lorenzi (1998) (United States) Steven Rikert (1998) (Brazil) Thiago Bezerra (1998) (France) Lucas Lasserre (1996-1998-1999) (United States) Ryan Walker (1999) (United States) Ryan Hampton (1998) (Brazil) Rodrigo Hanashiro (1998) (Italy) Davide Rigon (2012) (Italy) Raffaele Giammaria (2012) (France) Brandon Maïsano (2012-2013) (Ecuador) Sebastián Merchán (2012-2013)
- Drivers' Championships: 1983 Formula Panda Monza; 1985 Formula Panda Monza; 1986 Formula Panda Monza; 1996 Eurocup Formula Renault; 1997 Eurocup Formula Renault; 1998 Eurocup Formula Renault; 1999 Eurocup Formula Renault

The first Tatuus cars were manufactured for the 500cc and 1000cc Formula Monza championship. Founder Sandona was one of the drivers in this championship. Luca Melgrati won the first championship for Tatuus in 1983 in the Formula Panda Monza championship. Sandona achieved a second place in the championship. Tatuus were the team and chassis to beat. Melgrati won the championship again in 1985 and 1986. For the 1988 season the Italian manufacturer was contracted to build the cars for the new Formula König. The car was a tube-framed, wings and slicks racecar. The first season was won by future seven-time Formula 1 champion Michael Schumacher.

=== Formula 3 team ===
Although not a Formula 3 constructor, Tatuus entered the Italian Formula Three championship as a team in 1989. Driver Fabrizio Bettini took the rookie of the year title in his inaugural season. Bettini drove an Alfa Romeo powered Dallara 389 chassis and achieved two podium finishes in seven races. Niko Palhares represented Tatuus in their 1991 campaign. Palhares scored one pole position and one podium finish. Tatuus entered the Monaco Grand Prix Formula Three support race for the first time. Palhares achieved a 16th place, he was the last running driver. Their 1992 campaign ended in a second place in the championship for Brazilian driver Niko Palhares. Palhares had less luck in the annual Monaco F3 Grand Prix, failing to finish. Tatuus made their first appearance in the Masters of Formula 3. Palhares finished in 14th place during the second edition of this Formula 3 classic. The following year Fiat appointed Tatuus as their official factory team. The team had little success in the Italian championship (Gianantonio Pacchioni finishing seventh). But Pacchioni achieved a win at the prestigious Monaco Grand Prix Formula Three support race. At the Masters of Formula 3 at Circuit Park Zandvoort, local Formula Ford 1600 driver Tom Coronel joined the team. Pacchioni scored a seventh-place finish while Coronel finished in 20th place. The team improved for the following season, fielding Pacchioni, who was considered one of the favorites, and rookie Simone Rebai. Pacchioni didn't take the title but managed to finish third in the standings. For the Masters of Formula 3, Rebai was replaced by Roberto Colciago. Coming over from RC Motorsport Colciago managed to beat regular driver Pachioni by placing seventh compared to Pachioni's 25th place. After winning the Formula Alfa Boxer championship with a Tatuus chassis, Tony Kanaan joined the Tatuus Formula 3 team. Kanaan scored one win and was the best foreign driver in the Italian championship, finishing fifth in the final standings. After this season, Tatuus focused on Formula Renault.

=== Formula Renault era ===
In 1993 Gianfranco De Bellis became co-proprietor. Tatuus then-on focused on producing Formula Renault cars. The Tatuus RC95 was the first Formula Renault car made by Tatuus. The Tatuus factory team fielded three drivers, Italian Rino Mastronardi, Norwegian Tommy Rustad and Brazilian Enrique Bernoldi. The team competed in the Eurocup Formula Renault, Tommy Rustad won three races during the inaugural season for the team. The first title for the Tatuus factory team and chassis came in 1996. Enrique Bernoldi won six out of ten races and took the title. Teammate Danilo Cascio was places seventh. David Cook entered a Tatuus customer car in the British Formula Renault championship. In this very competitive championship Cook beat Darren Turner to the 1996 title. Other customer Tatuus chassis were entered in the French Formula Renault, Antoine Brousseau achieved a second place in the championship. A Tatuus chassis also took the title in the German Formula Renault with driver Alexander Müller. 1997 was a highly successful for the team and the chassis. The team scored a one-two finish in the European championship. Jeffrey van Hooydonk and Max Busnelli were a class on their own securing the first and second place in the championship. The top ten were seven Tatuus and three Martini cars. Three Tatuus customer entries filled the podium in the German championship. Robert Lechner won the title in front of Thomas Mutsch and Michael Schröter. Marc Hynes, driving a customer Tatuus, won the British title. The French championship, however, was a different story. France, home of Mygale, Martini and Renault, had the most competitive Formula Renault championship. Benoît Tréluyer driving a Tatuus was placed sixth in the championship standings, scoring one win and four podium finishes out of 17 races. Tatuus again was the chassis to beat in the European, British and German championships. Lucas Lasserre managed to achieve a third place in the French championship, behind two factory entered Mygales. Tatuus again dominated the British championship in 1999 with Tatuus chassis winning 12 out of 13 races, Antônio Pizzonia took the title. Tatuus customer entries also won the European and German championships. Lucas Lasserre now took the title in the prestigious French championship. In heavy competition between Mygale, Martini and Tatuus, Tatuus prevailed winning 14 out of 21 races.

=== USF2000 ===
For the 1997 racing season Tatuus made its debut in the USF2000, fielding a factory team. Rino Mastronardi won the second race of the season in the streets of St. Petersburg. Starting third, Mastronardi managed to finish in front of Matt Sielsky and Buddy Rice. This, however, was the only outing of Mastronardi. The rest of the season the team fielded Steven Rikert and Giuliano Losacco. Tatuus finished second in the manufacturer standings scoring 40 points, behind Van Diemen who scored 93 points. For the following season Tatuus supplied other teams with race cars as well as running the factory team. Factory driver Ryan Hampton finished second in the standings. Robby McGehee was the best placed customer Tatuus, fielded by RM Racing finished he third in the season standings. For the 1999 season Tatuus didn't field a factory team. Although some teams chose to run a Tatuus chassis, among them A. J. Foyt Enterprises fielding Larry Foyt. There were no full-time Tatuus entries, thus Tatuus could not compete for the title. Various Tatuus RC98 chassis are still being raced in the SCCA Formula Continental class. The car achieved various successes in the club racing scene. The cars were also entered in SCCA's most prestigious races the SCCA National Championship Runoffs and the June Sprints.

Tatuus was selected by the series promoter as the new spec chassis for the U.S. F2000 National Championship beginning in 2017. A derivative of the same chassis but with more power, downforce, and adjustments will be the spec chassis for the Pro Mazda Championship beginning in 2018.

=== Formula Ford Zetec ===
In 1998 Tatuus entered the Formula Ford Zetec market. In 1999 their chassis achieved success with German driver Timo Bernhard driving for Jenzer Motorsport. The German driver achieved four podium finishes and a third place in the German Formula Ford championship. After 1999 Tatuus did not update their Formula Ford Zetec chassis. In the current French Formula Ford Zetec championship, the Tatuus chassis achieved various wins and championships.

=== Formula Renault and the evolution from to a Race Car Manufacturer ===
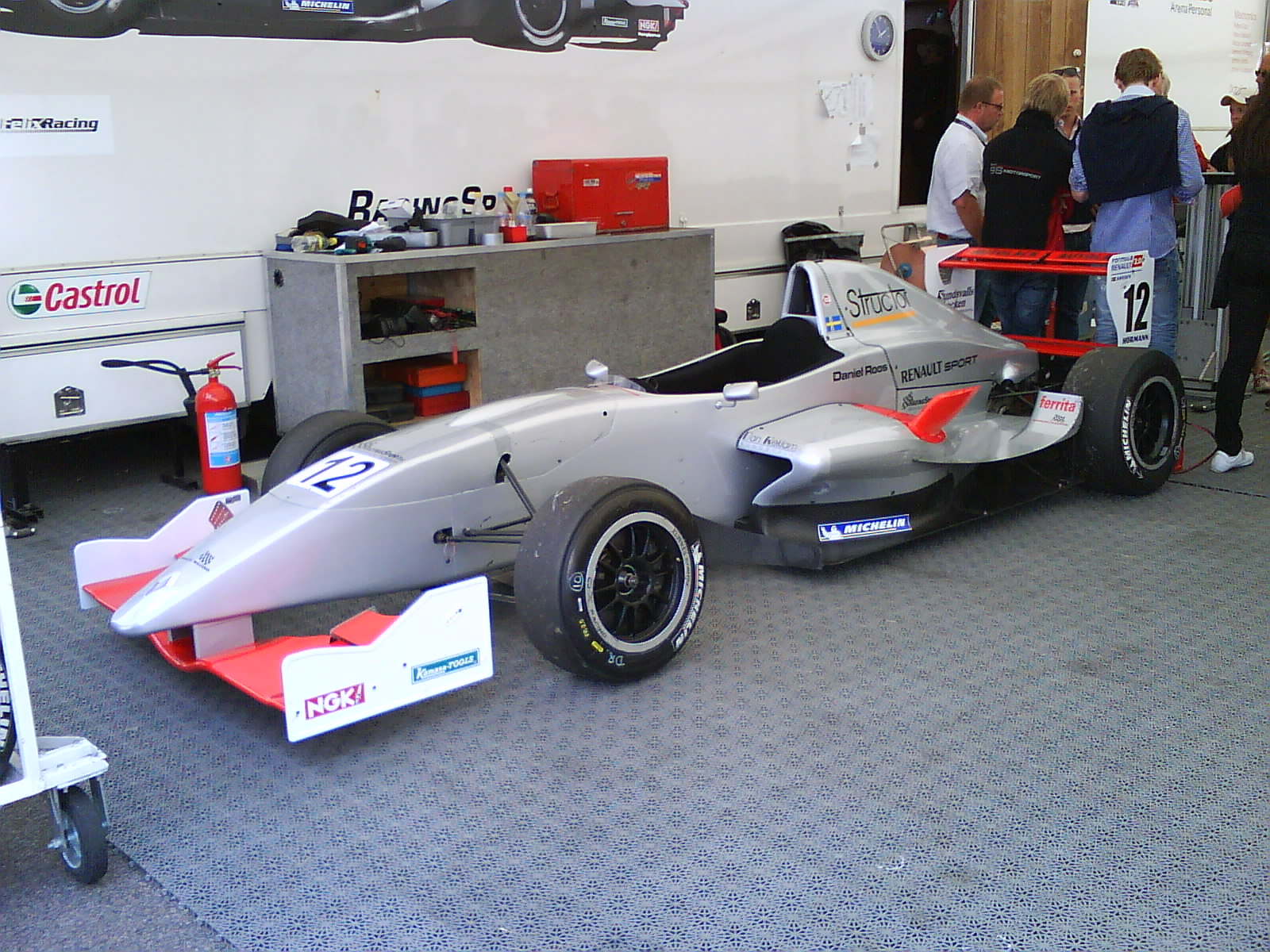
Tatuus FR2000 driven by Daniel Roos in the 2009 Formula Renault 2.0 Sweden.

Tatuus was contracted to design and manufacture the new specification Formula Renault cars. The Tatuus FR2000 debuted in 2000 in various Formula Renault championships. This racecar was used until 2010 when it was replaced by Barazi-Epsilon. In 2002 the Tatuus FR1600 was introduced to run in the Formula Renault 1.6. With the introduction of the spec formula classes, the racing team ceased to exist and the brand turned into a proper Race Car Manufacturer. For the 2003 Formula Renault V6 Eurocup season, the Tatuus FRV6 was introduced. After the European championship folded, the car was raced in the Formula V6 Asia between 2006 and 2009.

=== Toyota Racing Series ===
Tatuus was contracted by Toyota New Zealand to design the new Formula Toyota racing car. The Toyota FT40 was introduced in the Toyota Racing Series in 2005. After ten seasons the car was retired at the end of the 2014 Toyota Racing Series season. The cars last race, the New Zealand Grand Prix, was won by Nick Cassidy. For the 2015 Toyota Racing Series the Tatuus-built Toyota FT50 was introduced. On 20 July 2014 the FT50 was tested by former series champion Nick Cassidy at Adria International Raceway. The car featured the same engine as its predecessor but the gearbox was to be different. The five speed Sadev gearbox was upgraded to a six speed gearbox.

=== 2006 - 2012: more racing series ===
For 2006 Tatuus introduced the Tatuus FC106 for the Formula Challenge Japan. The car was used during the entire running of the series between 2006 and 2013.

Another junior formula car designed and manufactured by Tatuus is the Tatuus N.T07. This car was the sole car for the 2007, 2008 and 2009 International Formula Master seasons.

Italian racing class Formula Abarth introduced the Tatuus FA010 powered by a 1.4L Fiat-FPT engine. The car was later introduced in the Formula Masters China (2011), Panam GP Series (2012), Formula Russia (2013). Starting in 2014 the Florida Winter Series, set up by the Ferrari Driver Academy, used an updated version of the Tatuus FA010.

=== Group CN ===
In 2012 Tatuus announced their first Group CN sports car. The car competed in the Italian Prototype Championship, V de V Proto Endurance and the Speed Euro Series, fielded by the revived factory team. Factory driver Davide Rigon drove the car to a second place during the Speed Euro Series round at Imola. Raffaele Giammaria achieved three podium finishes and a fifth place in the Italian Prototype championship. For the 2013 season the Tatuus PY012 was entered by various teams in various racing series. The factory team ran partial schedule in the V de V Proto Endurance. Brandon Maïsano and Sebastián Merchán won the 6 hour race at Magny-Cours.

=== 2014: Formula 4 ===
For 2014 Tatuus was contracted to build all the cars for the Formula 4 Italian Championship, a new class under the rules of the FIA Formula 4. The Tatuus F4-T014 was powered by a detuned Formula Abarth engine, limited to 160hp. In 2015, the new ADAC Formula 4 adopted the Tatuus car. The BRDC Formula 4 Championship announced in September 2014 that it would use a Tatuus chassis from the 2015 BRDC Formula 4 Autumn Trophy.

Over the years, the global Formula 4 scene has steadily expanded, alongside the growing presence of Tatuus worldwide, supplying championships such as Spanish F4, F4 UAE, British F4, F4 Brasil, F4 SEA, F4 CEZ, the Formula Winter Series, F4 Saudi Arabia, F4 NACAM and several other equivalent series.

=== Road to Indy & MSV ===
Starting in 2016, Tatuus cars also became a key part of the first steps on the Road to Indy, the development pathway leading to the IndyCar Series. All three levels of the USF Pro Championships today feature Tatuus machinery: USF Juniors, USF 2000 and USF Pro 2000.

In the same period, the partnership with MotorSport Vision (MSV) was also established, leading over the years to the introduction of Tatuus cars in the BRDC British Formula 3 Championship, as well as in the GB3 and GB4 Championships.

=== Formula Regional ===
The launch of the Formula Regional category led, in 2018, to the introduction of the Tatuus T-318. Over the years, the car has been used across Formula Regional championships in Asia, Europe, Oceania, the Middle East and Australia.

=== W Series ===
The inaugural 2019 season of the all-female W Series championship used Alfa Romeo powered F3-specification T-318s, all operated by Hitech Racing.

=== 2023–2024: New Tatuus HQ and new cars ===
In January 2023, Tatuus relocated its operational headquarters from Concorezzo to the new, purpose-built Tatuus HQ in Lainate.

In the summer of 2024, Tatuus announced two new cars: the MSV-GB3-025 and the MSV-GB4-025. Both developed in collaboration with MotorSport Vision, the cars have been competing since 2025 in the GB3 and GB4 Championships respectively.

=== 2025: Tatuus T-326 opens the new generations of Formula Regional ===
2025 marked the debut of the T-326, the second-generation Formula Regional car designed by Tatuus. The car first hit the track in August 2025 and was officially unveiled in Monza in October, when the FIA Formula Regional European Championship announced its adoption starting from the 2026 season. The T-326 then made its competitive debut in January 2026 at the Yas Marina Circuit during the Formula Regional Middle East Trophy.

=== Timeline ===
Year	Racing car	Image	Engine	Units produced	Racing Series	Region
1982	Tatuus ??		Fiat 875cc I2	15	Formula Monza	Italy
1984	Tatuus ??		Fiat 903cc I4	70	Formula Panda	Italy
1988	Tatuus Formula König		Volkswagen 1.4 L I4	50	Formula König	Germany
???	Tatuus ??		SEAT 903cc I4	25	Formula Marbella	Spain
1993	Tatuus Formula Alfa Boxer		Alfa Romeo 1.7 L flat-four	25	Formula Alfa Boxer	Europe
1995	Tatuus RC95		Renault F3R 2.0 L		Formula Renault 2.0	Europe
1996	Tatuus RC96		Renault F3R 2.0 L		Formula Renault 2.0	Europe
1997	Tatuus RC97		Renault F3R 2.0 L		Formula Renault 2.0	Europe
1998	Tatuus RC98		Ford Zetec 2.0 L	15	USF2000	United States
1998	Tatuus RC98		Renault F3R 2.0 L		Formula Renault 2.0	Europe
1998	Tatuus RC98		Ford Zetec 1.8 L	10	Formula Ford 1800	Europe
1999	Tatuus RC99		Renault F3R 2.0 L		Formula Renault 2.0	Europe
2000	Tatuus FR2000		Renault F4R 2.0 L	930	Formula Renault 2.0	Worldwide
2002	Tatuus FR1600		Renault K4M 1.6 L	130	Formula Renault 1.6	Worldwide
2003	Tatuus FRV6		Renault V4Y RS 3.5 L V6	30	Formula Renault V6	Europe
2003	Tatuus FRV6		Renault V4Y RS 3.5 L V6	30	Formula V6 Asia	Asia
2005	Toyota FT40		Toyota 2ZZ-GE; 1.8 L	40	Toyota Racing Series	New Zealand
2006	Tatuus FC106		Nismo Renault F4R 2.0 L	30	Formula Challenge Japan	Japan
2007	Tatuus N.T07		Honda K20A 2.0 L	50	International Formula Master	Europe
2007	Tatuus N.T07		Honda K20A 2.0 L	50	Formula Master Italia	Spain
2010	Tatuus FA010		FPT 414TF 1.4 L	120	Formula Abarth	Italy
2010	Tatuus FA010		FPT 414TF 1.4 L	120	Panam GP Series	Central America
2010	Tatuus FA010		FPT 414TF 1.4 L	120	Formula Pilota China	China
2010	Tatuus FA010		FPT 414TF 1.4 L	120	Formula Masters Russia	Russia
2010	Tatuus FA010		FPT 414TF 1.4 L	120	Formula 3 Tatarstan Championship	Russia
2010	Tatuus FA010		FPT 414TF 1.4 L	120	Florida Winter Series	Florida
2012	Tatuus PY012		Honda K20A 2.0 L	20	Group CN	Worldwide
2013	Tatuus FR2.0/13		Renault F4R 2.0 L	185	Formula Renault 2.0	Worldwide
2014	Tatuus F4-T014		Abarth 1.4 L	290	Italian F4 Championship	Italy
2014	Tatuus F4-T014		Abarth 1.4 L	290	ADAC Formula 4	Germany
2014	Tatuus F4-T014		Abarth 1.4 L	290	F4 Spanish Championship	Spain; Portugal
2014	Tatuus F4-T014		Abarth 1.4 L	290	SMP F4 Championship	Estonia; Finland; Russia
2014	Tatuus F4-T014		Abarth 1.4 L	290	Formula 4 UAE Championship	United Arab Emirates
2015	Toyota FT-50		Toyota 2ZZ-GE 1.8 L	26	Toyota Racing Series	New Zealand
2016	Tatuus MSV F3-016		Cosworth 2.0 L	30	BRDC British Formula 3 Championship	United Kingdom
2017	Tatuus USF-17		Mazda MZR 2.0 L	40	USF2000	United States
2018	Tatuus PM-18		Mazda MZR 2.0 L	40	Pro Mazda	United States
2018	Tatuus F3 T-318		Alfa Romeo 1.8 L I4 turbocharged	290	Formula Regional Asian Championship	Asia
2018	Tatuus F3 T-318		Alfa Romeo 1.8 L I4 turbocharged	290	W Series	Worldwide
2018	Tatuus F3 T-318		Alfa Romeo 1.8 L I4 turbocharged	290	Formula Regional Middle East Championship	Middle East
2018	Tatuus FR-19		Renault Sport 1.8 L I4	290	Formula Renault Eurocup	Europe
2018	Tatuus FR-19		Renault Sport 1.8 L I4	290	Formula Regional European Championship	Europe
2018	Tatuus FT-60		Toyota 8AR-FTS; 2.0 L I4	290	Toyota Racing Series	New Zealand
2020	Tatuus BF-020		Cosworth 2.0 L		BRDC British Formula 3 Championship	United Kingdom
2021	Tatuus F4-T421		Abarth 1.4 L	500	UAE4 Series	United Arab Emirates
2021	Tatuus F4-T421		Abarth 1.4 L	500	ADAC Formula 4	Germany
2021	Tatuus F4-T421		Abarth 1.4 L	500	F4 British Championship	United Kingdom
2021	Tatuus F4-T421		Abarth 1.4 L	500	F4 Spanish Championship	Spain
2021	Tatuus F4-T421		Abarth 1.4 L	500	Italian F4 Championship	Italy
2021	Tatuus F4-T421		Abarth 1.4 L	500	F4 Brazilian Championship	Brazil
2021	Tatuus F4-T421		Abarth 1.4 L	500	Formula 4 CEZ Championship	Hungary; Czech Republic; Austria; Slovakia
2021	Tatuus F4-T421		Abarth 1.4 L	500	F1 Academy	Worldwide
2021	Tatuus F4-T421		Abarth 1.4 L	500	E4 Championship	Europe
2021	Tatuus F4-T421		Abarth 1.4 L	500	Formula 4 South East Asia Championship	Asia
2021	Tatuus F4-T421		Abarth 1.4 L	500	F4 Saudi Arabian Championship	Saudi Arabia
2021	Tatuus F4-T421		Abarth 1.4 L	500	NACAM Formula 4 Championship	Mexico
2021	Tatuus F4-T421		Abarth 1.4 L	500	AU4 Championship	Australia
2021	Tatuus F4-T421		Abarth 1.4 L	500	SMP F4 Championship	Russia
2022	Tatuus USF-22		Mazda MZR 2.0 L	70	USF2000 Championship	United States
2022	Tatuus IP-22		Mazda MZR 2.0 L	50	USF Pro 2000 Championship	United States
2022	Tatuus MSV-022		Mountune 2.0 L	45	GB3 Championship	United Kingdom
2023	Tatuus JR-23		Mazda MZR 2.0 L	60	USF Juniors	United States
2025	Tatuus MSV GB3-025		Mountune 2.0 L	35	GB3 Championship	United Kingdom
2025	Tatuus MSV GB4-025		Mountune 2.0 L	30	GB4 Championship	United Kingdom
2026	Tatuus T-326		Autotecnica ATM163T 1.6 L	35	Formula Regional Middle East Trophy	Middle East
2026	Tatuus T-326		Autotecnica ATM163T 1.6 L	35	Formula Regional European Championship	Europe
