= Steve Rikert =

- Nationality: (United States) American
- Born: August 5, 1969 (age 57) Rhinebeck, New York

USF2000
- Years active: 1997-1999
- Teams: Tatuus; Richard Morgan Racing
- Starts: 29
- Wins: 1
- Poles: 1
- Best finish: 3rd in 1999

Previous series
- 1997-1999 1994-1997: USF2000; Barber Dodge Pro Series; Skip Barber Eastern Series

Steve Rikert (born August 5, 1969, in Rhinebeck, New York) is a former racing driver who competed in the Barber Dodge Pro Series and the USF2000.

== Career ==
After racing in the regional Skip Barber Eastern Series, Rikert moved to the Barber Saab Pro Series in 1994. He finished outside the top ten in the 1994 Barber Saab Pro Series season. The Skip Barber Racing School graduate had a decent run in the 1996 Barber Dodge Pro Series season. Rikert finished fifth at Watkins Glen International. He earned points on several occasions finishing thirteenth in final standings. Rikert ran only six Barber Dodge Pro Series races in 1997.

Rikert first made his USF2000 debut at Mid-Ohio Sports Car Course in Lexington, Ohio. In a field of fifty drivers, Rikert finished seventeenth. He also participated in the season finale at Watkins Glen. For 1998, Rikert signed with the factory Tatuus team in the USF2000. He finished tenth in the standings, best of the factory entered Tatuus chassis. For 1999, Rikert made the switch to the dominant Van Diemen chassis. The American won one race at Atlanta Motor Speedway from start to finish. The race was marred by a red flag after a heavy crash involving Larry Foyt and five other drivers. The Richard Morgan Racing driver scored another two podium finishes. He eventually finished third in the championship standings, behind Marc-Antoine Camirand and series champion Dan Wheldon.

Rikert previously owned an automobile repair shop in his native town of Rhinebeck. The business was acquired by Northside Auto Body, an auto shop based in Poughkeepsie, NY, in 2023.

== Complete motorsports results ==
=== American Open-Wheel racing results ===
(key) (Races in bold indicate pole position, races in italics indicate fastest race lap)

==== Complete USF2000 National Championship results ====
Year	Entrant	1	2	3	4	5	6	7	8	9	10	11	12	13	14	Pos	Points
1997		WDW	STP	PIR	DSC1	DSC2	SAV	PPI	CHA1	CHA2	MID; 17	WGI; 23	WGI; 11			**N.C.**	**N.C.**
1998	Tatuus	WDW	PIR	HMS1; 10	HMS2; 6	WGI; 6	WGI; 8	MID1; 26	MIN; 5	CHA1; 5	CHA2; 6	MID2; 45	ATL; 17	PPI; 32	PPI; 7	**10th**	**167**
1999	Richard Morgan Racing	PIR; 3	CHA1; 9	CHA2; 7	MOS; 5	MOS; 4	MID; 3	**ATL**; 1	ROA1; 8	ROA2; 7	CTR; 16	MID; 6	PPI; 11	SEB1; 10	SEB2; 14	**3rd**	**201**
