= Tony Renna =

American racing driver

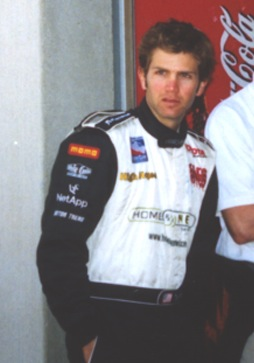
- Renna at the Indianapolis Motor Speedway in May 2003
- Born: Anthony James Renna; November 23, 1976 Victorville, California, U.S.
- Died: October 22, 2003 (aged 26) Speedway, Indiana, U.S.
- Debut season: 2002
- Former teams: Chip Ganassi Racing; Kelley Racing
- Starts: 7
- Wins: 0
- Poles: 0
- Fastest laps: 0
- Best finish: 24th in 2002

Awards
- 1996: Team USA Scholarship

Anthony James Renna (November 23, 1976 – October 22, 2003) was an American racing driver who competed in Indy Lights and the Indy Racing League (IRL) from 1998 to 2003. Renna began competitive racing at the age of six, winning 252 races and two national quarter-midget championships before the age of fifteen. Renna progressed to car racing at sixteen, competing for three years in the Barber Dodge Pro Series and partnering with stock car driver Jerry Nadeau to finish second for the United States team at the 1996 EFDA Nations Cup. He progressed to Championship Auto Racing Teams' developmental series Indy Lights, winning one race during his three seasons in the championship from 1998 to 2000.

In 2002, Renna signed with Kelley Racing to be its test driver in the IRL, and was the driving coach and spotter to actor and Infiniti Pro Series participant Jason Priestley. Renna competed in seven races for Kelley Racing before signing a contract to drive for Chip Ganassi Racing in the 2004 IndyCar Series. During an October 2003 tire test at Indianapolis Motor Speedway, Renna was killed instantly in a collision with a retaining fence. He was the first driver to be killed in an accident in the IRL since Scott Brayton died during practice for the 1996 Indianapolis 500. As a consequence of Renna's death, car speeds and horsepower were reduced through a reduction in engine sizes and aerodynamics were altered in a bid to prevent cars becoming airborne. A memorial fund and IRL award were named after him.

== Early and personal life ==
Renna was born in Victorville, California, on November 23, 1976, to jockey and meat-company owner Joe Renna and his wife Mary. He had two sisters; he was a cousin of George Steinbrenner IV, co-owner of Harding Steinbrenner Racing. The family moved to Apple Valley, California, from Tampa, Florida, in 1975 and Renna's parents subsequently divorced. His family later moved to the Orlando neighborhood of College Park before residing in DeLand.

Renna was educated at Bishop Moore High School and Father Lopez Catholic High School, graduating from the latter in 1995. As a child, he was a batboy for the New York Yankees baseball team, and played American football, basketball and baseball. He was engaged at the time of his death, and was due to marry in Hawaii on November 22, 2003.

== Junior career ==
=== Karting and sprint cars ===
Renna began go-kart racing in Orlando at age six. He spent his Friday nights at Horsemen's Park in Ocoee, refined his driving ability at circuits in Barberville, Bithlo and New Smyrna Beach, and was taught by former driver Ralph Liguori. Renna focused full-time on racing after deeming himself inadequate at Little League Baseball. He told his father of his choice of career, and was asked, "Do you know what you're asking for? Do you know you are asking for the brass ring and the Olympic gold medal?"

Renna began focusing on an opportunity in open-wheel racing, idolizing drivers Rick Mears, and Al Unser Jr., and wanted to drive for Team Penske. Renna went on to drive a quarter-midget, a mini sprint, a motocross bike, and a micro-sprint. He won 252 races, and two national quarter-midget championships before the age of fifteen. His mechanically inclined father constructed and maintained the machinery that Renna drove, and acted as his crew chief. Renna's mother was his timekeeper, and one of his sisters acted as a tire changer. (Note: Both of Renna's sisters raced before they took up different pursuits.)

=== Early car racing career ===
At the age of sixteen, Renna progressed to car racing, competing in the Skip Barber Formula Ford Racing Series in 1993, in a bid to become a road course ringer. He took one win and seven top-three finishes for tenth in the final points standings. His form improved the following year, when he won eight races and achieved three-second-place finishes to win the series championship.

In 1995, Jim O'Bryan, an employee of American driver development organization Racing for America, asked if Renna was interested in driving in Europe; Renna said he was but his father was unsure because the family budget was strained through entering selected rounds of the 1995 Barber Dodge Pro Series. O'Bryan met the Renna family again in mid-1995 at Mid-Ohio Sports Car Course and agreed to compete in Formula Three. Renna tested a Mark Bailey Racing-owned Ralt Formula Three car. Team owner Mark Bailey was complimentary towards Renna, whose father signed him to drive for Murray Taylor Racing until he pulled out due to budget concerns. In the UK, Renna drove six races in a Dallara F394-Vauxhall car for West Surrey Racing in the 1995 British Formula Three Class B Championship. He secured a category win at Pembrey Circuit that was later nullified because of an infraction, three pole positions, and three podiums.

In 1996, Renna returned to the United States with a depleted budget. He competed in a Dodge-powered Mondiale car in the 1996 Barber Dodge Pro Series, finishing seventh in the Drivers' Championship with 105 points from three podium finishes and two pole positions. He was named the 1996 Barber Dodge Pro Series Rookie of the Year, and won a Skip Barber Racing School Big Scholarship. Renna won the Team USA Scholarship over six other candidates and participated at the 1996 EFDA Nations Cup at Donington Park. He partnered with stock-car driver Jerry Nadeau in a Formula Opel Lotus car, finishing second to win the silver medal. Renna was selected as a finalist for the Team Green Academy as one of the top-five of 25 competitors, and was nominated for the Lynx Racing Scholarship.

=== Later junior career ===
Renna made one appearance in the U.S. F2000 National Championship for DSTP Motorsports in its No. 23 Van Diemen-Ford car at Walt Disney World Speedway in January 1997, finishing ninth. He continued to race in the Barber Dodge Pro Series, entering eight races and claiming three podium finishes and two pole positions to score 54 points and place tenth in the championship. In September 1997, Mattco Raceworks founder and owner Matt Cohen hired Renna to drive for its Indy Lights (at the time Championship Auto Racing Teams (CART)'s feeder series) team for the 1998 season. Renna moved from DeLand to a studio in New York City later that year to be closer to the team. He visited Mattco's headquarters in Englewood Cliffs, New Jersey four days per week to acquaint himself with the team. Driving the No. 77 Lola-Buick car, (Note: He did not start the season-opening race at Homestead-Miami Speedway, and missed the Molson Indy Vancouver round due to a clavicle fracture that he sustained in a go-karting crash.) he won at Michigan International Speedway, took two pole positions, and had six top ten finishes to place eighth in the drivers' championship with 68 points.

In April 1999, CART imposed a one-year suspension on Mattco Raceworks from its racing series for illegal engine modifications in the car of Renna's teammate Mark Hotchkis. Renna, still contracted to Mattco, sought employment in either NASCAR's Busch Series (now Xfinity Series) or the Truck Series. Motor-racing journalist Jeremy Shaw and the Team USA Scholarship made the PacWest Racing team aware of Renna's potential. He drove a partial 1999 Indy Lights schedule for PacWest, and was the test and development driver for its CART team. Renna drove the No. 17 vehicle, gaining two top-ten finishes and a sixteenth-place finish in the drivers' championship with 22 points.

Having signed a five-year contract in late October 1999, Renna returned to PacWest Racing for the 2000 Indy Lights, and continued as its test and development driver. He undertook a two-day test session at Firebird Raceway in December 1999 as preparation for the season. Renna changed his car number to 18; he attained top-ten finishes in every round during the season except for two due to consecutive retirements: a mechanical failure at Milwaukee Mile and an accident in Detroit. Renna finished fifth in the drivers' championship with 105 points.

Before the 2001 racing season, an agreement for Renna to drive for PacWest's CART team fell through, and he was released from its Indy Lights operation. Renna was less active in professional car racing during the year, making one appearance in the SpeedVision World Challenge at Mosport International Raceway in May, driving the No. 12 SSC Parts/TC Kline BMW M3. He finished 17th and was 54th in the final standings with nine points. He spent much of the year seeking employment with race teams, visiting garages, writing letters to them, and networking within the Indy Racing League (IRL). Renna was employed as a driving instructor at Las Vegas Motor Speedway's Derek Daly Performance Driving Academy, and competed in NASCAR late model stock car events for Dick Cobb on a weekly basis at the track.

== IndyCar Series career ==
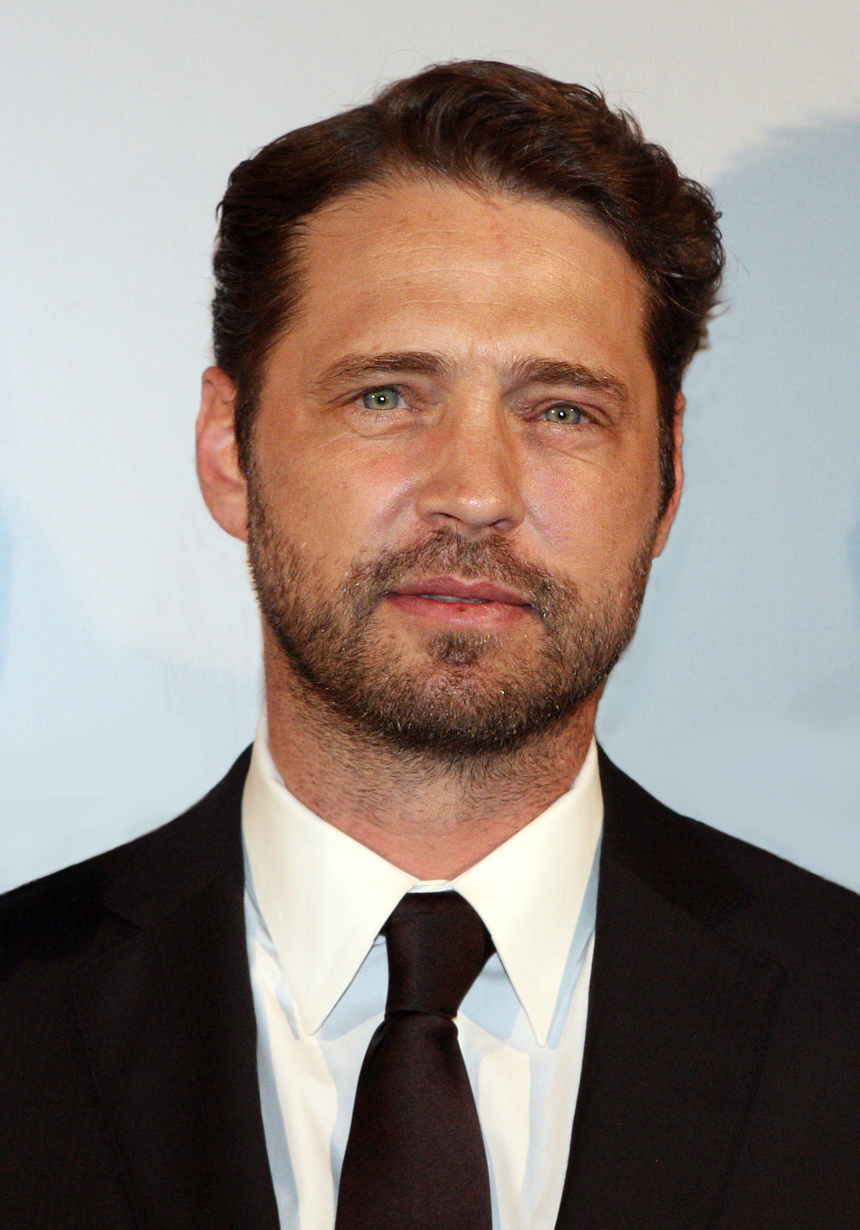
Jason Priestley (pictured in 2012), an actor whom Renna coached while the latter drove in the developmental Infiniti Pro Series

Kelley Racing team owner Tom Kelley and general manager Jim Freudenberg were introduced to Renna in 2000. The three became acquainted; Renna inquired about employment at the team, and signed a contract in May 2002. In mid-2002, Renna and his business manager suggested he should coach actor Jason Priestley, who raced in the developmental Infiniti Pro Series that year; Kelley Racing was enthusiastic about the idea and agreed. Renna also served as Priestley's spotter, (Note: Former Barber Dodge Pro Series driver Sara Senske took over from Renna as Priestley's spotter when the former competed in the Indy Racing League.) and the two became friends. He was employed as Kelley Racing's IRL test driver, curtailing his stock car driving to focus on the job. Renna listened to radio communication from Kelley Racing driver Al Unser Jr. during races, learning patience, and acted as his spotter. When Unser went into an alcohol rehabilitation center in Connecticut in July 2002, Kelley Racing searched for a replacement driver for two events and asked Renna to fill in for Unser because he demonstrated enthusiasm.

Under the observation of three-time Indianapolis 500 winner Johnny Rutherford, Renna passed an IRL-sanctioned, four-phase, rookie test at Texas Motor Speedway that allowed him to compete. In his first two races driving Kelley Racing's No. 7 Dallara-Chevrolet vehicle in the 2002 Indy Racing League, Renna took consecutive top-ten finishes at Nashville Superspeedway and Michigan International Speedway. After Unser returned from rehabilitation, the team expanded its roster to three cars because they were impressed with Renna's performance and obtained sponsorship to allow him to continue driving. Renna switched his car number from 7 to 78, and took two more top-ten finishes for 24th overall with 121 points.

After the season concluded, a budget decrease led Kelley Racing to reduce its roster from three to two cars, leaving Renna without a race seat; he remained an employee of the team. Renna continued to work as Unser's spotter and drove go-karts to maintain his fitness. The difficulty in finding sponsorship to compete in races restricted Renna primarily to being a test driver, but he made a single race appearance in the 2003 IndyCar Series, the Indianapolis 500. Starting from eighth place, Renna finished in seventh. In Indianapolis, Chip Ganassi Racing (CGR) managing director Mike Hull told team owner Chip Ganassi that Renna was a driver to take notice of. In October 2003, Ganassi offered Renna a driving role in his team for the 2004 IndyCar Series in place of Tomas Scheckter— who moved to Panther Racing—and to partner 2003 IndyCar Series champion Scott Dixon. Renna accepted the role; Tom Kelley allowed him to leave on October 1 and join CGR, because he could not guarantee Renna would drive for Kelley Racing in 2004.

== Death ==
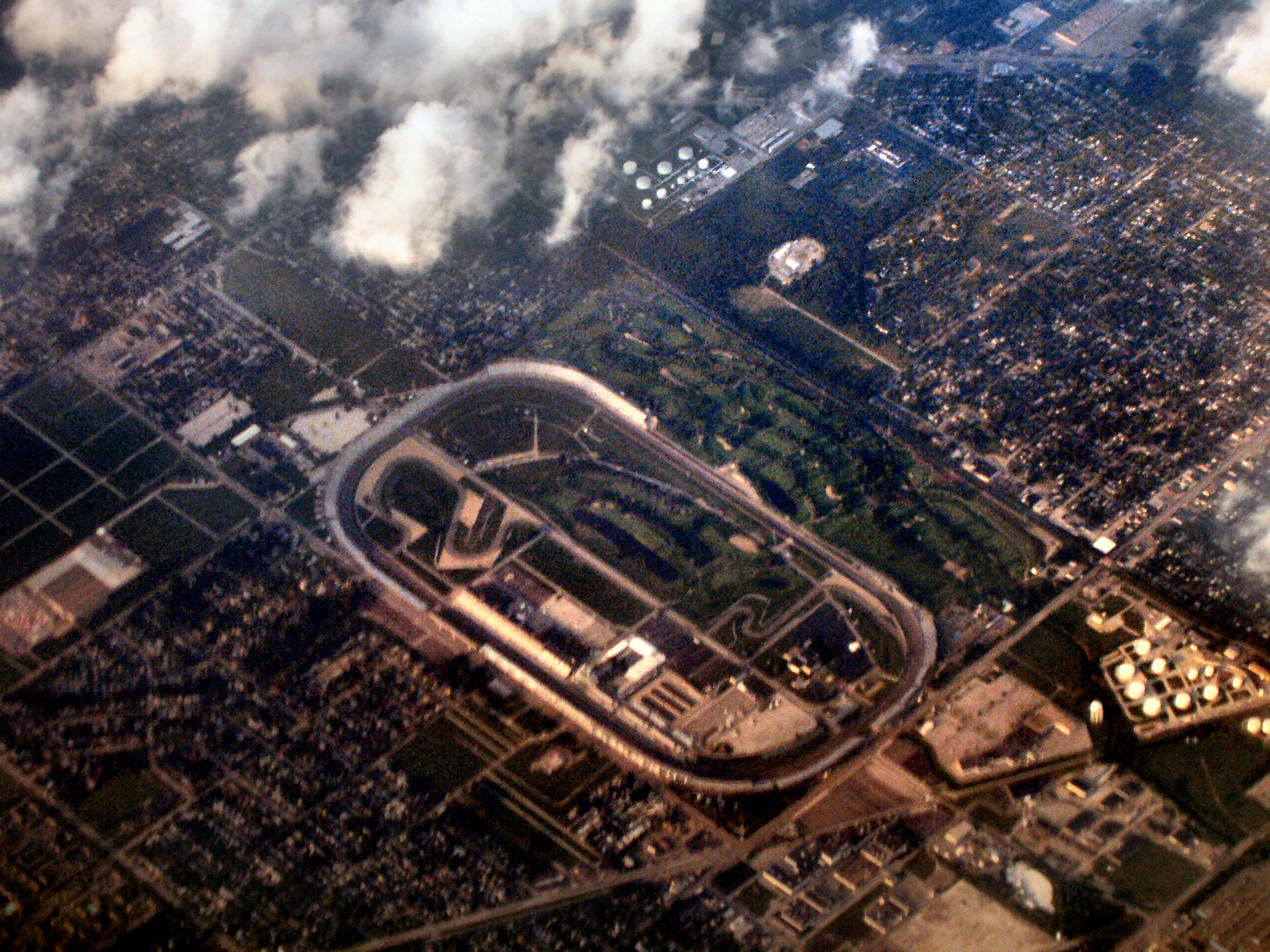
Indianapolis Motor Speedway (pictured in 2005), where Renna was killed in a post-season test session accident while driving for Chip Ganassi Racing

Renna made his first on-track appearance for CGR in a private Firestone tire-test session at Indianapolis Motor Speedway on October 22. The track and the tires on his car were cold. At 9:20 am Eastern Daylight Time (UTC−05:00), while on his fourth lap driving the No. 10 G-Force-Toyota car, (Note: Renna's teammate Scott Dixon drove the car on October 21 as the No. 1 car and reported no issues.) Renna entered turn three below the normal racing line at 227 mph (365 km/h). He lost control of the vehicle, without having made any prior collision with the trackside SAFER barriers, which did not appear to have suffered a mechanical fault. Renna's car spun sideways, just after the turn's apex and rotated 90 degrees to the left into the infield grass. Air penetrated the vehicle's bottom, causing it to lift as it skipped over the grass. While travelling airborne, the car turned about another 30 degrees to the left.

The bottom of Renna's car struck the outside retaining fence above the 4 ft (1.2 m) SAFER barrier at the exit to turn three, causing a deceleration of more than 100 g_{0} (980 m/s^{2}), a force that the human body is unable to withstand. This destroyed the car, splitting it into two, throwing its gearbox into the nearby grandstand, snapping the fence posts, and scattering debris over the track and grandstand walkway. The first layer of grandstand in the track's north section was lacerated. Renna, who was equipped with a HANS device, was killed instantly by massive internal trauma. No-one else was injured. The cockpit tub that holds the driver inside the car was ensnared in the fence and dangled there with Renna still in it. IRL medical personnel arrived at the scene and were unable to restart Renna's heart. He was transported by ambulance to Indiana University Health Methodist Hospital, about a six-minute drive away, where he was pronounced dead on arrival at 9:43 local time.

=== Aftermath and investigation ===
Renna was the first fatality in the IRL since Scott Brayton was killed during practice for the 1996 Indianapolis 500, and the first in American open-wheel racing since Greg Moore died in a major accident during a CART race at California Speedway in 1999. (Note: There have been two other deaths at Indianapolis Motor Speedway since then, a security worker at the 2004 Brickyard 400 and a motorcycle racer at the 2010 Indianapolis motorcycle Grand Prix.) An autopsy was conducted by Marion County Coroner John McGoff, who determined Renna died instantaneously after sustaining fatal, blunt-force head and chest injuries from the high force of the impact. On the afternoon of October 27, Renna was given a memorial service at St. John the Evangelist Catholic Church; another took place four days later at St. Peter's Catholic Church in Deland, Florida, and was attended by 400 people. Darren Manning took Renna's seat at CGR.

The week after Renna's death, the IRL began an investigation, involving officials from Indianapolis Motor Speedway, CGR and Firestone. (Note: The Occupational Safety & Health Administration did not investigate the accident because Indianapolis Motor Speedway is a privately owned facility.) Because Renna's crash occurred during a private test session, with the media and public not allowed to enter the speedway, there were no eyewitnesses, photographs or video footage of the accident. The car was impounded at the track; the connectors on its black box were severely damaged, rendering officials unable to download the on-board electronic data it contained. The black box was sent to its manufacturer in the United Kingdom, where data stored in the car's accident data recorder was downloaded to determine whether a mechanical failure contributed to Renna's crash.

The results of the investigation into Renna's death were released to the public on December 19, 2003; the investigation was prolonged because the incident happened during a private test session. According to the report, the data provided to the IRL "did not produce a 100 percent conclusion as to why the tragic accident occurred. There are many unknown possibilities that could have contributed to the cause of the accident." The report focused on the way the car lifted into the air and the events surrounding Renna's death. The IRL concluded the spectator fences worked as designed and the speed at which Renna was traveling was similar to those monitored in accidents at the circuit in recent years. (Note: The amount of g-forces absorbed by Renna and the car, the cold weather, the time of day at which the crash occurred, and the role of a dead, gull-sized bird found lying on the entry to the third turn were absent from the report.)

== Personality and legacy ==
Renna was called "a rising star in motor racing" by Nilima Fox of The Independent, and was described by Reggie Yates of The News-Sentinel as "a driver open-wheel fans wanted to see succeed". He was well-liked; Renna was described as quiet, tender-hearted, benevolent, a man who adored his family, energetic, enthusiastic, and vibrant.

As a consequence of his fatal accident and major crashes involving drivers Kenny Bräck, Hélio Castroneves, Gil de Ferran and Mario Andretti in 2003, the IRL mandated rule changes from the 2004 Indianapolis 500 onward with the intention of reducing power by ten percent—approximately 100 hp (75 kW)—and reduced speeds of around 10 mph (16 km/h). Accordingly, car engine sizes were reduced from 3.5 L to 3.0 L and aerodynamics were altered in a bid to prevent cars becoming airborne.

The Tony Renna Memorial Fund was established in Michigan to continue the driver's work, which was based on his "approach to life of caring about others". The fund supports Autism Speaks, the Team USA Scholarship and the Surfrider Foundation through public donations. In January 2004, Father Lopez Catholic School renamed its annual golf tournament after Renna to raise funds for the memorial foundation. The same year, the IRL renamed its Rising Star Award after Renna. The award is given to "an up-and-coming IndyCar Series driver who embodies the qualities of the late Renna". At the season-ending Lime Rock Rolex Sports Car Series race and the 2013 Petit Le Mans of the American Le Mans Series, sports car driver and Renna's protégé Patrick Long sported a helmet livery similar to Renna in celebration of his mentor's career on the tenth anniversary of his death.

== Motorsports career results ==
=== Career summary ===
Season	Series	Team	No.	Races	Wins	Poles	F/Laps	Points	Position
1995	British Formula Three Championship – Class B	West Surrey Racing	70	6	0	2	N/A	63	8th
1996	Barber Dodge Pro Series	N/A	N/A	12	0	2	N/A	105	7th
1996	EDFA Nations Cup	United States	N/A	1	0	0	0	N/A	2nd
1997	Barber Dodge Pro Series	N/A	N/A	8	0	2	0	54	10th
1997	U.S. F2000 National Championship	DSTP Motorsports	N/A	1	0	0	0	12	31st
1998	Indy Lights	Mattco Raceworks	77	12	1	2	0	68	8th
1999	Indy Lights	PacWest Lights	17	5	0	0	1	22	16th
2000	Indy Lights	PacWest Lights	18	12	0	0	0	105	5th
2001	SpeedVision World Challenge	SSF Parts/TC Kline	12	1	0	0	0	9	54th
2002	Indy Racing League	Kelley Racing	7 & 78	6	0	0	0	121	24th
2003	IndyCar Series	Kelley Racing	32	1	0	0	0	26	30th

=== American open-wheel racing results ===
(key) (Races in bold indicate pole position) (Races in italics indicate fastest lap) (Small number denotes finishing position)

==== Complete USF2000 National Championship results ====
Year	Entrant	1	2	3	4	5	6	7	8	9	10	11	12	Pos	Points	Ref
1997	DSTP Motorsports	WDW; 9	STP	PIR	DSC1	DSC2	SAV	PPI	CHA1	CHA2	MOH	WGI	WGI	**31st**	**12**	

==== Indy Lights ====
Year	Team	1	2	3	4	5	6	7	8	9	10	11	12	13	14	Rank	Points	Ref
1998	Mattco Raceworks	MIA; DNS	LBH; 12	NAZ; 10	STL; 22	MIL; 5	DET; 15	POR; 12	CLE; 5	TOR; 21	**MIS**; 1	TRO; 20	VAN	LS; 8	**FON**; 3	**8th**	**68**	
1999	PacWest Lights	MIA	LBH	NAZ	MIL; 3	POR; 14	CLE; 19	TOR; 14	MIS; WD	DET	CHI	LS	FON; 6			**16th**	**22**	
2000	PacWest Lights	LBH; 9	MIL; 17	DET; 17	POR; 4	MIS; 3	CHI; 3	MOH; 4	VAN; 6	LS; 4	STL; 4	HOU; 10	FON; 3			**5th**	**105**	

==== IndyCar ====
Year	Team	No.	Chassis	Engine	1	2	3	4	5	6	7	8	9	10	11	12	13	14	15	16	Rank	Points	Ref
2002	Kelley Racing	7	Dallara	Chevrolet	HMS	PHX	FON	NZR	INDY	TXS	PPIR	RIR	KAN	NSH; 10	MIS; 4						24th	121	
2002	Kelley Racing	78	Dallara	Chevrolet												KTY; 7	STL; 24	CHI; 15	TX2; 9		24th	121	
2003	Kelley Racing	32	Dallara	Chevrolet	HMS	PHX	MOT	INDY; 7	TXS	PPIR	RIR	KAN	NSH	MIS	STL	KTY	NZR	CHI	FON	TX2	30th	26	

Years	Teams	Races	Poles	Wins	Podiums (Non-win)	Top 10s (Non-podium)	Indianapolis 500 Wins	Championships	Ref
2	1	7	0	0	0	5	0	0	

===== Indianapolis 500 results =====
Year	Chassis	Engine	Start	Finish	Team	Ref
2003	Dallara	Toyota	8	7	Kelley Racing	

== See also ==
- List of fatalities at the Indianapolis Motor Speedway

== Notes ==
Preceded by Greg Moore	Fatalities in Champ Car/IndyCar; 2003	Succeeded by Paul Dana
