= Derek Hill (racing driver) =

American racing driver (born 1975)

- Nationality: American
- Born: March 28, 1975 (age 51) Santa Monica, California, U.S.
- Relatives: Phil Hill (father)
- Categorisation: FIA Silver

Previous series
- 1995 1995 1995–1996 1996–1997 1997 1998 1999 2000 2001–2003 2002 2004: 348 Ferrari Challenge; Ferrari Challenge International; Formula Dodge; Barber Dodge Pro Series; American Le Mans Series; Toyota Atlantic Series; Formula Palmer Audi; Italian Formula 3000; International Formula 3000; Grand Am Sportscar; American Le Mans Series

Championship titles
- 1995 1996 1997: Ferrari Challenge International; Formula Dodge West Coast; Barber Dodge Pro Series Drivers' Champion

Awards
- 1996 1997 1999: Barber Pro Series Rookie of the Year; AARWBA All America Team; Goodwood Revival Driver of the Weekend

Derek John Hill (born March 28, 1975) is an American racing driver. He is the son of 1961 Formula One World Champion Phil Hill.

== Career ==
=== Early career ===
Hill initially raced karts in California and Ferrari sports cars (his father won his F1 title with the team). Winning three of three races in the championship runoffs in Italy at the Mugello circuit in the Ferrari 355, Hill attracted the attention of the Alfa Romeo Factory DTM team and was invited to test the DTM car at Mugello in November 1995.

=== Barber Dodge Pro Series ===
Hill competed in the US-based Barber Dodge Pro Series in 1996, finishing third overall, taking Rookie-of-the-Year honors. In 1997, he took the championship title, winning four races in the process.

=== Professional Sports Car / IMSA ===
Also in 1997, Hill raced the Factory BMW M3 for the Prototype Technology Group in GTS3 Class. He won the GTS3 class at the Daytona 24 Hours and the Sebring 12 Hours as well as scoring two other wins with teammate, Javier Quiros.

=== Formula Toyota Atlantic ===
Hill moved up to Formula Toyota Atlantic for 1998, finishing 13th in the championship.

=== Formula Palmer Audi ===
Hill moved into European racing in 1999 by taking part in the second season of the Formula Palmer Audi series, organised by former F1 driver Jonathan Palmer. He finished 19th in that year's championship.

=== Formula 3000 ===
For 2000, Hill competed in six races of the Italian Formula 3000 series, failing to score any points. The following year, he moved up to the more prestigious FIA-backed series with the DAMS team with teammate, Sébastien Bourdais, and remained there in 2002 (a part-season with Durango, replacing Alexander Müller) and 2003 (with Super Nova). In three years, he scored a total of four points and was dropped midway through 2003 in favour of Nicolas Kiesa, who had been left without a drive due to the withdrawal of the Super Nova-run Den Blå Avis outfit.

Nonetheless, Hill was often the most prominent American driver competing in Europe at this time. During this period he also entered into a management contract with Anthony Haas and Brigitte Hill – daughter and sister of Formula 1 champion namesakes Graham and Damon respectively – to act as his managers. He is currently involved in historic racing and working as a racing instructor after moving back to the United States to help look after his elderly father, who died in August 2008.

=== Other career highlights ===
In 1996, Hill competed in the 1996 24 Hours of Daytona in a Bugatti EB110 Competizione in the GT1 category, setting fastest lap in the Daytona Test Days. Leading the class in the seventh hour, the car experienced mechanical failure. This was the last time a Bugatti raced professionally in the United States.

In 2002, Hill raced in the Grand Am, Fontana Four-Hour California Grand Prix, in the Saleen S7. He won the category and finished fourth overall.

== Racing record ==
=== Career summary ===
Season	Series	Team name	Races	Poles	Wins	Points	Final Placing
1995	348 Ferrari Challenge North America	Ferrari of Beverly Hills	9	1	3	585	2nd
1995	Ferrari Challenge International	Team Fitti	3	3	3		1st
1995	Formula Dodge	N/A	14	?	11	?	1st
1996	Barber Dodge Pro Series	N/A	?	4	5	?	3rd
1997	Barber Dodge Pro Series	N/A	12	3	4	157	1st
1997	American Le Mans Series	BMW Prototype Technology Group	?	?	4	?	2nd
1998	Toyota Atlantic Championship	P1 Racing	11	0	0	47	13th
1999	Goodwood Revival/TT	Shelby	1	1	0		2nd
2000	Italian Formula 3000	Da Vinci Team	6	0	0	0	NC
2001	International Formula 3000	DAMS	12	0	0	0	NC
2002	International Formula 3000	Durango Formula	7	0	0	0	NC
2003	International Formula 3000	Super Nova Racing	6	0	0	4	16th
2006	Goodwood Revival/Freddie March Cup	N/A	1	1	1		1st

=== Complete Italian Formula 3000 results ===
(key) (Races in bold indicate pole position; races in italics indicate fastest lap)

Year	Entrant	1	2	3	4	5	6	7	8	DC	Points
2000	Da Vinci Team	VLL; Ret	MUG; 13	IMO; 8	MNZ; Ret	VLL; 11	DON; 8	PER	MIS	NC	0

=== Complete International Formula 3000 results ===
Year	Entrant	1	2	3	4	5	6	7	8	9	10	11	12	DC	Points
2001	DAMS	INT; 14	IMO; Ret	CAT; 16	A1R; 13	MON; Ret	NÜR; 15	MAG; 16	SIL; Ret	HOC; Ret	HUN; 12	SPA; 9	MNZ; 12	NC	0
2002	Durango Formula	INT	IMO	CAT	A1R	MON	NÜR; 7	SIL; Ret	MAG; Ret	HOC; 9	HUN; Ret	SPA; 7	MNZ; Ret	NC	0
2003	Super Nova Racing	IMO; 15	CAT; 11	A1R; Ret	MON; DSQ	NÜR; 5	MAG; 10	SIL	HOC	HUN	MNZ			16th	4

Sporting positions
Preceded by Fredrick Larsson	Barber Dodge Pro Series Champion; 1997	Succeeded by Jeff Simmons
