= Jacob Abel =

Jacob Abel may refer to:

- Jake Abel (born 1987), American actor
- Jake Abel (rugby union) (born 1997), Australian rugby union player
- Jacob Friedrich von Abel (1751–1829), German philosopher
- Jacob Abel (racing driver) (born 2001), American racing driver

== See also ==
- Jacob Abels (1803–1866), Dutch painter
- John Jacob Abel (1857–1938), American biochemist and pharmacologist
