= Reno Grand Prix =

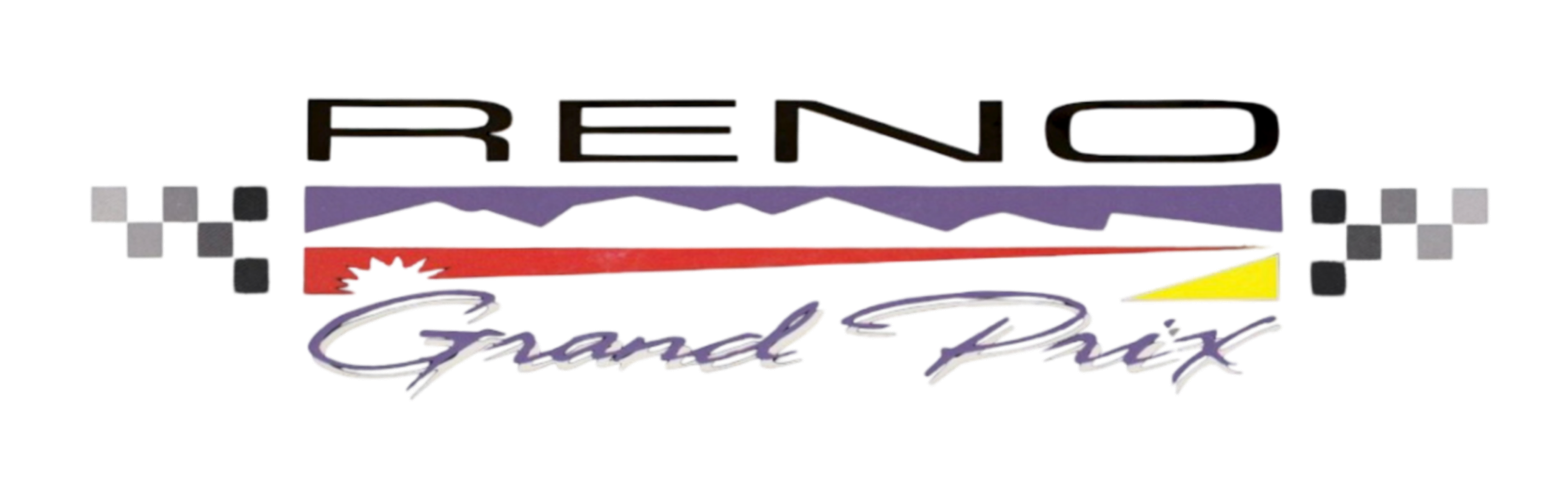

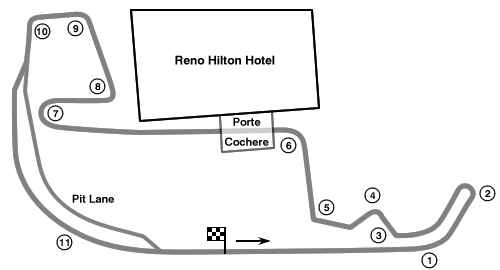

SCCA Trans Am Series
- Location: Reno, Nevada, USA; 39.522854°N 119.779226°W
- First race: 1996
- Last race: 1997
- Distance: 95.25 mi (153.29 km)
- Laps: 75

Circuit information
- Length: 1.27 mi (2.04 km)
- Turns: 11
- Lap record: 1:00.953 (USA Tom Kendall, Ford Mustang, 1997, Trans-Am)

The Reno Grand Prix (officially named the Reno Grand Prix Presented by IGT Megabucks due to sponsorship reasons) was a SCCA Trans-Am Series event that was held on a temporary street circuit set up in the parking lot of the Reno Hilton hotel and casino, (now known as the Grand Sierra Resort), in Reno, Nevada.
