= Chris Menninga =

American racecar driver (born 1974)

Chris Menninga (born October 21, 1974, in Austin, Texas) is a retired racecar driver who has raced in open wheel racing.

Menninga started in the Barber Dodge Pro Series where he raced from 1995 to 1997, winning a race and finishing fourth in points his final year. He then moved to Indy Lights driving for Conquest Racing in 1999 finishing fourteenth in points. He returned to the team and series in 2000 and finished ninth in points with a best finish of fourth at the Milwaukee Mile. In 2001, he competed in three late-season IRL IndyCar Series races for Hemelgarn Racing, dropping out of two before the finish and finishing sixteenth at Chicagoland Speedway. In 2005, he competed in one Toyota Atlantic race at Road America for ArmsUp Motorsports.

Menninga was later a spotter for Conquest Racing in the Champ Car series.

Menninga lives in Des Moines, Iowa.

== Complete American open-wheel racing results ==
(key)

=== Indy Lights ===
Year	Team	1	2	3	4	5	6	7	8	9	10	11	12	Rank	Points
1999	Conquest Racing	MIA; 9	LBH; 8	NAZ; 6	MIL; 12	POR; 7	CLE; 10	TOR; 10	MIS; 13	DET; 19	CHI; 10	LAG; 6	FON; 7	14th	47
2000	Conquest Racing	LBH; 11	MIL; 4	DET; 6	POR; 5	MIS; 18	CHI; 9	MDO; 14	VAN; 17	LS; 13	STL; 5	HOU; 5	FON; 9	9th	67

=== Atlantic Championship ===
Year	Team	1	2	3	4	5	6	7	8	9	10	11	12	Rank	Points
2005	Armsup Motorsport	(United States); LBH	(Mexico); MTY	(United States); POR1	(United States); POR2	(United States); CLE1	(United States); CLE2	(Canada); TOR	(Canada); EDM	(United States); SJO	(United States); DEN	(United States); ROA; 9	(Canada); MTL	22nd	13

=== IRL IndyCar Series ===
Year	Team	Chassis	No.	Engine	1	2	3	4	5	6	7	8	9	10	11	12	13	Rank	Points
2001	Hemelgarn Racing	Dallara	92	Oldsmobile	PHX	HOM	ATL	INDY	TEX	PIK	RIR	KAN	NSH	KTY	GAT; 19	CHI; 16	TEX; 19	33rd	36
