= Ronnie Johncox =

Racecar driver (born 1969)

Ronnie Johncox (born February 13, 1969, in Jackson, Michigan), is a professional racecar driver with over two-hundred wins. He is a former driver in the Indy Racing League. He raced in the 1999-2000 seasons with eight career starts.

Johncox's best career IRL finish was in eleventh position in his first contest, the Longhorn 500 at Texas Motor Speedway. In 2002–2003, he stepped down to the Indy Pro Series, where he raced ten times with one pole, three top-five finishes and eight top-tens. His last professional race was in the 2003 Freedom 100 at Indianapolis Motor Speedway.

Johncox currently owns and operates Technique, Inc. which is a prototype metal stamping and laser cutting company based in Jackson, Michigan and Technique Engineered Chassis Components in Mooresville, NC that most notably produces "kits" to assemble the racing chassis of the NASCAR Car of Tomorrow. Many of the top teams in NASCAR use Technique Engineered Chassis Components.

Johncox is a graduate of Michigan State University.

== Motorsports career results ==
=== American open-wheel racing results ===
(key)

==== IndyCar Series ====
Year	Team	Chassis	No.	Engine	1	2	3	4	5	6	7	8	9	10	11	Rank	Points	Ref
1999	Tri-Star Motorsports	Dallara IR9	22	Oldsmobile Aurora V8	WDW	PHX	CLT	INDY	TEX; 11	PIK	ATL; 25	DOV; 20	PIK; 24			26th	59	
1999	Tri-Star Motorsports	Dallara IR9	17	Oldsmobile Aurora V8										LSV; 15	TEX; 26	26th	59	
2000	Byrd-McCormack Racing	G-Force	30	Oldsmobile	WDW	PHX; 14	LSV; 13	INDY; Wth	TEX	PIK	ATL	KTY	TEX			27th	33	

==== Indy Pro Series ====
Year	Team	1	2	3	4	5	6	7	8	9	10	11	12	Rank	Points
2002	REV 1 Racing	KAN; 9	NSH; 12	MIS; 5	KTY; 4	STL; 8	CHI; 5	TXS; 8						6th	180
2003	REV 1 Racing	HMS; 10	PHX; 12	INDY; 8	PPIR	KAN	NSH	MIS	STL	KTY	CHI	FON	TXS	17th	62
