= Cory Witherill =

Navajo race car driver

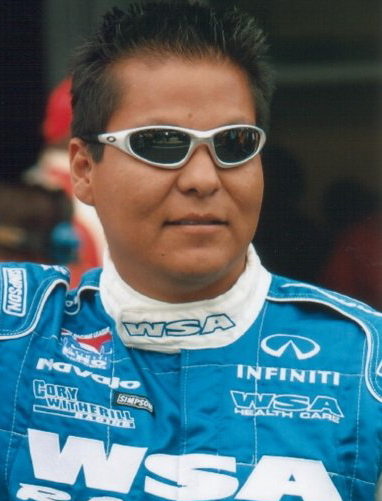
- Witherill at Indianapolis Motor Speedway in 2003
- Born: December 17, 1971 (age 54) Santa Monica, California, U.S.

Cory Witherill (born December 17, 1971) is an American race car driver from Los Angeles who competed in the Indy Racing League, Infiniti Pro Series, Indy Lights, and ARCA series. He made an incredible bump day run on a brand new engine to qualify for the 2001 Indianapolis 500, becoming the only full-blooded Native American to race in the Indy 500. He finished nineteenth. In 2002 and 2003, with the collapse of the IRL team he drove for, he went to the Infiniti Pro Series driving for Ron Hemelgarn Racing. In 2002, he had eight podium finishes and one win at Nashville Superspeedway. He attempted to become the first full-blooded Native American in NASCAR.

== Personal life ==
Witherill currently lives in Santa Monica, with his wife Jennifer Khasnabis (former reporter for MotorWeek TV). Their first child, Graham Liston Witherill, was born in September 2009. In late 2017, the couple announced they were separating, and subsequently filed for divorce.

== Racing record ==
=== American open–wheel racing results ===
(key) (Races in bold indicate pole position)

==== CART Indy Lights / Infiniti Pro Series ====
Year	Team	1	2	3	4	5	6	7	8	9	10	11	12	13	14	Rank	Points
1998	Genoa Racing	HMS	LBH	NAZ	GAT	MIL; 13	DET	POR	CLE	TOR	MIS	TRO	VAN; 15	LAG; 12	FON; 4	23rd	13
1999	Genoa Racing	HMS; 15	LBH; 14	NAZ; 14	MIL; 17	POR; 19	CLE; 16	TOR; 11	MIS; 17	DET; 12	CMS; 15	LAG; 11	FON; 4			18th	17
2000	Genoa Racing	LBH; 19	MIL; 13	DET; 15	POR; 15	MIS; 11	CMS; 14	MOH	VAN	LAG	GAT; DNS	HOU	FON; 13			19th	2
2001	Indy Regency Racing	MTY; 9	LBH; 7	TXS	MIL; 11	POR; 7	KAN; 6	TOR; 11	MOH; 8	GAT; 10	ATL; 10	LAG; 11	FON; 10			12th	44
2002	Hemelgarn 91/Johnson Motorsports	KAN; 3	NSH; 1*	MIS; DNS	KTY; 3	GAT; 11	CHI; 13	TXS; 2								4th	213
2003	Hemelgarn 91/Johnson Motorsports	HMS; 12	PHX; 9	INDY; 2	PPR; 12	KAN; 5	NSH; 6	MIS; 15	GAT; 2	KTY; 2	CHI; 6	FON; 9	TXS; 3			5th	336
2004	Hemelgarn Racing	HMS	PHX	INDY; 7	KAN	NSH	MIL	MIS	KTY	PPR	CHI; 15	FON	TXS			21st	41

==== IndyCar Series ====
(key)

Year	Team	Chassis	No.	Engine	1	2	3	4	5	6	7	8	9	10	11	12	13	Rank	Points	Ref
2001	Indy Regency Racing	G-Force	16	Oldsmobile	PHX	HMS	ATL; 22	INDY; 19	TXS	PPIR	RIR	KAN	NSH	KTY	GTW	CHI	TXS	40th	19	

==== Indianapolis 500 ====
Year	Chassis	Engine	Start	Finish	Team
2001	G-Force	Oldsmobile	31	19	Indy Regency Racing
