= Dave Steele =

American racing driver

David Steele
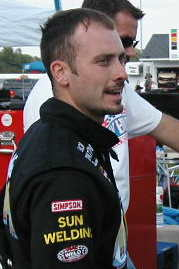
- Steele in 2003
- Born: May 7, 1974; Tampa, Florida, U.S.
- Died: March 25, 2017 (aged 42); Bradenton, Florida, U.S.
- Cause of death: Racecar crash
- Occupations: Racecar driver, Business Owner
- Awards: USAC Silver Crown Champion, 2004 and 2005; National Sprint Car Hall of Fame, 2018; United States Auto Club Hall of Fame, 2019

David MacFarland Steele (May 7, 1974 – March 25, 2017) was an American professional racing driver who won numerous sprint car racing championships and also competed in IndyCar and NASCAR races. Steele last drove a winged sprint car in the Southern Sprintcar Shootout Series, where he won the first five races in series history. Steele was killed in a crash at Desoto Speedway on March 25, 2017.

Steele was posthumously inducted into the National Sprint Car Hall of Fame on the first eligible ballot in 2018.

== Racing career ==
=== Sprint Cars, Midgets, and Silver Crown ===
==== Championships ====
Steele won three Tampa Bay Area Racing Association (TBARA) championships.

Steele claimed sixty wins in USAC sprint car (26), midget (eighteen), and Silver Crown (sixteen) races between 1996 and 2007.

Steele claimed the USAC Silver Crown Series championship in 2004 and 2005, putting him in the company of drivers such as Mario Andretti, A. J. Foyt, Al Unser, Jeff Gordon, and Tony Stewart.

==== Race Wins ====
Steele won the 2001 and 2003 Turkey Night Grand Prix midget car race. Other notable Turkey Night winners include A. J. Foyt, Tony Stewart, and Billy Boat.

Steele was also a two-time winner of the Little 500, held annually at Anderson Speedway. Throughout his sixteen starts in that race, he was a five-time pole-sitter and finished in the top-five ten times.

Steele won the Copper Classic at Phoenix International Raceway eight times. He won the Silver Crown portion five times and Midget race three times. In 1998, he won the Night Before the 500 race.

=== IndyCar and NASCAR ===
Steele attempted to make his Indy Racing League IndyCar Series debut in 1996 at the Las Vegas Motor Speedway for ABF Motorsports but failed to qualify. He made his first start in 1998 at Phoenix International Raceway, the second race of the season, driving for RSM Marko, then drove in the final two races of the year for Panther Racing. He failed to finish all three races. He was entered in a Panther car for the 1999 Indianapolis 500 but crashed in practice.

Steele drove in the first two races of the 2000 NASCAR Busch Series for Felix Sabates. After finishes of 23rd and 34th, he failed to qualify for the next three races and Steele and the team parted ways.

Steele also competed in four ARCA Racing Series races in 1999 and 2000 and two Infiniti Pro Series races (one each in 2002 and 2003). In 2002, Steele raced for Bowes Seal Fast Racing at Michigan finishing eighth in the Infiniti Pro Series.

=== Death ===
Steele was killed in a racing accident during a Southern Sprintcar Shootout Series race at Desoto Speedway in Bradenton, Florida, on March 25, 2017. His car's front wheel struck and overrode the rear wheel of another car during the event, sending him into the wall; he was pronounced dead at the scene.

== Honors ==
- The Carb Night Classic at Lucas Oil Raceway, starting in 2018, is now known as the Dave Steele Classic.
- He was elected to the National Sprint Car Hall of Fame on the first ballot in 2018 under the six month rule.
- He was elected to the United States Auto Club Hall of Fame in 2019.

== Motorsports career results ==
=== American open–wheel racing results ===
(key) (Races in bold indicate pole position)

==== Indy Racing League ====
Indy Racing League results
Year	Team	Chassis	No.	Engine	1	2	3	4	5	6	7	8	9	10	11	Rank	Pts	Ref
1996-97	ABF Motorsports	Lola	96	Buick	NHA	LVS; DNQ	WDW	PHX	INDY	TXS	PPIR	CLT	NHA2	LSV2		NC	0	
1998	RSM Marko	Riley & Scott	22	Oldsmobile	WDW	PHX; 22	INDY	TXS	NHA	DOV	CLT	PPIR	ATL			36th	17	
1998	Panther Racing	Riley & Scott	43	Oldsmobile										TXS; 24	LVS; 27	36th	17	
1999	Panther Racing	G-Force	43	Oldsmobile	WDW	PHX	INDY; DNQ	TXS	PPIR	ATL	DOV	PPIR	LVS	TXS		NC	0	

==== Indianapolis 500 ====
Year	Chassis	Engine	Start	Finish	Team	Ref
1999	G-Force	Oldsmobile	DNQ		Panther Racing	

==== Indy Pro Series ====
Year	Team	1	2	3	4	5	6	7	8	9	10	11	12	Rank	Points
2002	Bowes Seal Fast Racing	KAN	NSH	MIS; 8	KTY	STL	CHI	TXS						**19th**	**24**
2003	Brian Stewart Racing	HMS	PHX	INDY	PPIR	KAN	NSH; 11	MIS	STL	KTY	CHI	FON	TXS	**25th**	**19**

=== NASCAR ===
(key) (Bold – Pole position awarded by qualifying time. Italics – Pole position earned by points standings or practice time. * – Most laps led.)

==== Busch Series ====
NASCAR Busch Series results
Year	Team	No.	Make	1	2	3	4	5	6	7	8	9	10	11	12	13	14	15	16	17	18	19	20	21	22	23	24	25	26	27	28	29	30	31	32	NBSC	Pts	Ref
1999	Team SABCO	82	Chevy	DAY	CAR	LVS	ATL	DAR	TEX	NSV	BRI	TAL	CAL	NHA	RCH	NZH	CLT	DOV	SBO	GLN	MLW	MYB	PPR	GTY	IRP	MCH	BRI	DAR	RCH	DOV	CLT	CAR	MEM	PHO; DNQ	HOM	NA	-	
2000	Team SABCO	82	Chevy	DAY; 23	CAR; 34	LVS; DNQ	ATL; DNQ	DAR; DNQ	BRI	TEX	NSV	TAL	CAL	RCH	NHA	CLT	DOV	SBO	MYB	GLN	MLW	NZH	PPR	GTY	IRP	MCH	BRI	DAR	RCH	DOV	CLT	CAR	MEM	PHO	HOM	88th	155	

=== ARCA Bondo/Mar-Hyde Series ===
(key) (Bold – Pole position awarded by qualifying time. Italics – Pole position earned by points standings or practice time. * – Most laps led.)

ARCA Bondo/Mar-Hyde Series results
Year	Team	No.	Make	1	2	3	4	5	6	7	8	9	10	11	12	13	14	15	16	17	18	19	20	21	ABMSC	Pts	Ref
1999	Team SABCO	01	Chevy	DAY	ATL	SLM	AND	CLT	MCH	POC	TOL	SBS	BLN	POC	KIL	FRS	FLM	ISF	WIN	DSF	SLM	CLT; 16	TAL; 11		68th	355	
1999	Team SABCO	02	Chevy																					ATL; 40	68th	355	
2000	Team SABCO	01	Chevy	DAY; 11	SLM	AND	CLT	KIL	FRS	MCH	POC	TOL	KEN	BLN	POC	WIN	ISF	KEN	DSF	SLM	CLT	TAL	ATL		98th	175	
