= Aaron Fike =

American racing driver

- Born: November 24, 1982 (age 43); Galesburg, Illinois, U.S.
- Awards: 2002, 2003 United States Auto Club National Midget Driver of the Year

NASCAR O'Reilly Auto Parts Series career
- 52 races run over 3 years
- Best finish: 28th (2005)
- First race: 2004 Goody's Headache Powder 200 (Rockingham)
- Last race: 2006 New England 200 (New Hampshire)
Wins	Top tens	Poles
0	1	0

NASCAR FedEx Freight Truck Series career
- 12 races run over 1 year
- Best finish: 25th (2007)
- First race: 2007 Chevy Silverado HD 250 (Daytona)
- Last race: 2007 O'Reilly 200 (Memphis)
Wins	Top tens	Poles
0	4	0
- Statistics up to date as of August 21, 2012.

Aaron Fike (born November 24, 1982) is an American racing driver, a former competitor in NASCAR and USAC. The younger brother of A. J. Fike, he was suspended from NASCAR competition from 2007 to 2012 due to a drug-related arrest.

== Open-wheel career ==
Fike began racing in 2001 in the USAC Silver Crown Series, where he became the youngest driver to win a Silver Crown race (breaking Jeff Gordon's record). He finished tenth in points, earning him the Rookie of the Year award.

In 2002, he won seven midget feature races in addition to winning the Badger Midget Auto Racing Association championship. He also raced in the IRL Infiniti Pro Series for Hemelgarn Racing, finishing fifth with a win at Chicagoland.

In 2003, Fike won the World Championship Midget Feature in Auckland, New Zealand, and the USAC Night Before the 500 race. He competed in the full Infiniti Pro Series schedule, with a win at Pikes Peak on route to a sixth-place finish.

== NASCAR career ==
Fike made his stock car debut towards the end of 2003 in an ARCA RE/MAX Series race at South Boston Speedway, where he finished ninth.

He began racing part-time in the Busch Series in 2004 in the No. 43 Curb Agajanian Performance Group car, and for GIC-Mixon Motorsports. His best finish that year came at the Stacker 200 Presented by YJ Stinger, where he finished 17th.

For 2005, Fike signed a driver development contract with Brewco Motorsports, and split time in their No. 66 Duraflame Ford Taurus with Greg Biffle. He recorded his first top-ten finish at the Salute to the Troops 250 Presented by Dodge, where he finished eighth. He also ran 17 races with the No. 43, his best finish in that car being a 14th at Homestead. At the end of the year, he was released from his contract at Brewco.

Fike started 2006 driving the No. 43 for Curb, but soon signed with Kevin Harvick Incorporated for a limited schedule. He was released after two races.

Fike drove for Red Horse Racing in the Craftsman Truck Series in 2007, where he had four top-ten finishes. He was arrested in the parking lot of Kings Island in July 2007, and subsequently suspended by NASCAR and released from his contract.

== Legal troubles ==
In March 2003, Fike was arrested for driving under the influence in his hometown of Galesburg, Illinois and was eventually released.

On July 7, 2007, Fike and his long-time girlfriend and fiancée, Red Horse crew member Cassandra "Casi" Davidson, were arrested in the parking lot of Kings Island in Mason, Ohio. Fike attempted to evade police when asked to exit his truck, striking an officer with the mirror of the vehicle; upon being stopped and searched, syringes containing brown liquid, which Fike admitted were heroin, were found within the vehicle. Davidson stated that both she and Fike used the heroin. Both were arrested on charges of possession of heroin and drug paraphernalia.

On July 11, 2007, Fike (as well as Davidson) was suspended indefinitely by NASCAR for violating Section 12-4-A (actions detrimental to stock car racing) of the 2007 NASCAR Rule Book. Red Horse Racing released Fike from his contract the following day. On August 29, the misdemeanor possession of drug abuse instruments charge was dropped by prosecutors.

Though he initially pleaded not guilty, in November 2007, Fike pleaded guilty to possession of a drug abuse instrument and a reduced charge of attempted possession of heroin, both misdemeanors. He admitted that he had spent four months in treatment for the addiction, and publicly stated that the habit almost killed him at least once. He was sentenced to two years of probation after agreeing to establish a non-profit anti-drug group, Racing Against Drugs.

In an April 2008 interview for ESPN, Fike admitted to years of painkiller abuse, as well as heroin use on race days.

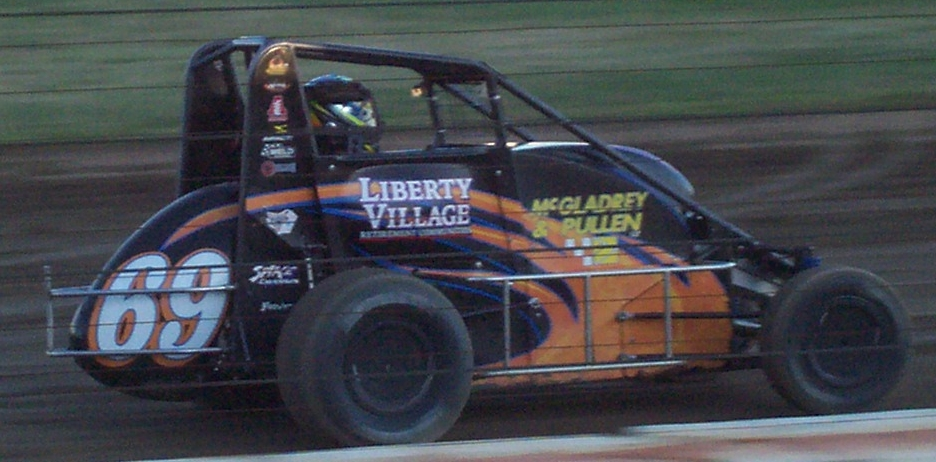
2008 midget car

Fike returned to racing midget cars at Angell Park Speedway and the USAC national tour after his NASCAR suspension; he was tested upon arrival at the track for every race.

Fike was reinstated by NASCAR on August 21, 2012, upon his successful completion of NASCAR's Substance Abuse Policy Road to Recovery Program. Fike has not competed in NASCAR since.

== Motorsports career results ==
=== American Open-Wheel racing results ===
(key)

=== Infiniti Pro Series ===
Year	Team	1	2	3	4	5	6	7	8	9	10	11	12	Rank	Points
2002	Hemelgarn Racing	KAN; 11	NSH; 3	MIS; 4	KTY; 14	STL; 14	CHI; 1	TXS; 12						**5th**	**186**
2003	Hemelgarn Racing	HMS; 8	PHX	INDY; 6	PPR; 1*	KAN; 4	NSH; 14	MIS; 4	GAT; 6	KTY; 6	CHI; 5	FON; 6	TXS; 5	**6th**	**328**

=== NASCAR ===
(key) (Bold – Pole position awarded by qualifying time. Italics – Pole position earned by points standings or practice time. * – Most laps led.)

==== Busch Series ====
NASCAR Busch Series results
Year	Team	No.	Make	1	2	3	4	5	6	7	8	9	10	11	12	13	14	15	16	17	18	19	20	21	22	23	24	25	26	27	28	29	30	31	32	33	34	35	NBSC	Pts	Ref
2004	Curb Racing	43	Dodge	DAY	CAR; 35	LVS	DAR	BRI	TEX	NSH; 39	TAL	CAL	GTY	RCH	NZH; 30	CLT	DOV								IRP; 23	MCH	BRI	CAL	RCH; 43	DOV; 17	KAN; 39	CLT; 33	MEM; 35	ATL	PHO; 34	DAR; 42	HOM; 33		46th	802	
2004	GIC–Mixon Motorsports	24	Chevy															NSH; 36	KEN	MLW	DAY	CHI	NHA	PPR															46th	802	
2005	Curb Racing	43	Dodge	DAY	CAL	MXC	LVS; 27	ATL; DNQ			TEX; DNQ	PHO	TAL; 22	DAR							DAY; 38	CHI; 42						MCH; 34	BRI	CAL; 37						TEX; 29			27th	2010	
2005	Brewco Motorsports	66	Ford						NSH; 35	BRI								NSH; 38		MLW; 20				PPR; 8	GTY; 31	IRP; 19	GLN								MEM; 35				27th	2010	
2005	Curb Racing	43	Ford												RCH; 30	CLT	DOV; 26		KEN; 18				NHA; 24								RCH; 23	DOV; 23	KAN; 26	CLT; 14			PHO; 20	HOM; 16	27th	2010	
2006	Curb Racing	43	Dodge	DAY; 43	CAL; 36	MXC; 28	LVS; 40	ATL; 26	BRI; 18	TEX; 31	NSH; 15	PHO; 31	TAL; 23	RCH; 35	DAR; 43	CLT; DNQ	DOV																						43rd	1004	
2006	Kevin Harvick Incorporated	33	Chevy															NSH; 42	KEN; 31	MLW	DAY	CHI	NHA; 30	MAR	GTY	IRP	GLN	MCH	BRI	CAL	RCH	DOV	KAN	CLT	MEM	TEX	PHO	HOM	43rd	1004	

==== Craftsman Truck Series ====
NASCAR Craftsman Truck Truck Series results
Year	Team	No.	Make	1	2	3	4	5	6	7	8	9	10	11	12	13	14	15	16	17	18	19	20	21	22	23	24	25	NCTSC	Pts	Ref
2007	Red Horse Racing	1	Toyota	DAY; 16	CAL; 18	ATL; 12	MAR; 7	KAN; 8	CLT; 14	MFD; 24	DOV; 10	TEX; 11	MCH; 17	MLW; 21	MEM; 5	KEN	IRP	NSH	BRI	GTW	NHA	LVS	TAL	MAR	ATL	TEX	PHO	HOM	25th	1487	

==== Busch East Series ====
NASCAR Busch East Series results
Year	Team	No.	Make	1	2	3	4	5	6	7	8	9	10	11	NBESC	Pts	Ref
2006	Pritchard Motorsports	41	Chevy	GRE	STA	HOL	TMP	ERI	NHA; 29	ADI	WFD	NHA	DOV	LRP	65th	76	

=== ARCA Re/Max Series ===
(key) (Bold – Pole position awarded by qualifying time. Italics – Pole position earned by points standings or practice time. * – Most laps led.)

ARCA Re/Max Series results
Year	Team	No.	Make	1	2	3	4	5	6	7	8	9	10	11	12	13	14	15	16	17	18	19	20	21	22	ARSC	Pts	Ref
2003	Ray Montgomery Racing	27	Dodge	DAY	ATL	NSH	SLM	TOL	KEN	CLT	BLN	KAN	MCH	LER	POC	POC	NSH	ISF	WIN	DSF	CHI	SLM	TAL	CLT; 16	SBO; 9	54th	585	
