= Michigan 500 =

Indy car race at Michigan

IndyCar Series
- Venue: Michigan International Speedway
- First race: 1968
- Last race: 2007
- Distance: 500 miles (644 km)
- Laps: 250
- Previous names: Norton Michigan 500 (1981–1983); Michigan 500 (1984–1986); Marlboro 500 (1987–1996); U.S. 500 Presented by Toyota (1997–1999); Michigan 500 Presented by Toyota (2000); Harrah's 500 Presented by Toyota (2001)

The Michigan 500 was an IndyCar Series race held at Michigan International Speedway in Brooklyn, Michigan. Held from 1981 to 2001, the event was held in high prestige, constituting part of Indy car racing's 500-mile "Triple Crown".

Between 1968 and 2007, Michigan International Speedway hosted a total of 55 Indy car races, across USAC, CART, and Indy Racing League sanctioning. The first event was a 250-mile USAC race won by Ronnie Bucknum. Throughout the 1970s and into the 1980s, the facility typically hosted two events per season, one race during the summer, and one race during the fall. In 1981, the summer race was expanded to 500 miles, and the Inaugural Michigan 500 was won by Pancho Carter. A total of twenty-two 500-mile Indy car races were held at Michigan, including 21 annual editions of the Michigan 500, plus the 1996 U.S. 500.

After 1986, the fall race was dropped. In 2002, the lone summer race switched to the Indy Racing League, and the distance was shortened to 400 miles. The final Indy car race (as of 2025) was held in 2007. The races at Michigan gained a reputation for high speeds, being rough on equipment, high attrition, and for devastating crashes. The 1990 race, won by Al Unser Jr. (189.727 mph) was the fastest 500-mile race in history at the time, a record that stood until 2002. Two drivers (Michael Andretti and Scott Goodyear) won the Michigan 500 twice, while Tony Kanaan won a 500-mile race and a 400-mile race. In addition, the track has produced many surprise winners, owing much to the frequently high attrition. Twelve drivers have scored their first – and in some cases only – Indy car race win at Michigan.

== Race history ==
=== USAC ===
In 1968, American open wheel racing debuted at the circuit with a 200-mile (320 km) USAC Championship Car event. In 1970, USAC returned with what would become a traditional July race date. Indy car owner and promoter Roger Penske purchased the track in 1972, and it became a mainstay on the Indy/Championship Car calendar.

In 1973, a second race was added to the USAC Championship Car schedule, a fall race usually held in September. Through 1980, all events were either 200 or 250 miles in length, with some events consisting of twin 125-mile races. On multiple occasions, the USAC Championship Car races at Michigan were held as part of a doubleheader with the USAC Stock Car series.

=== CART ===
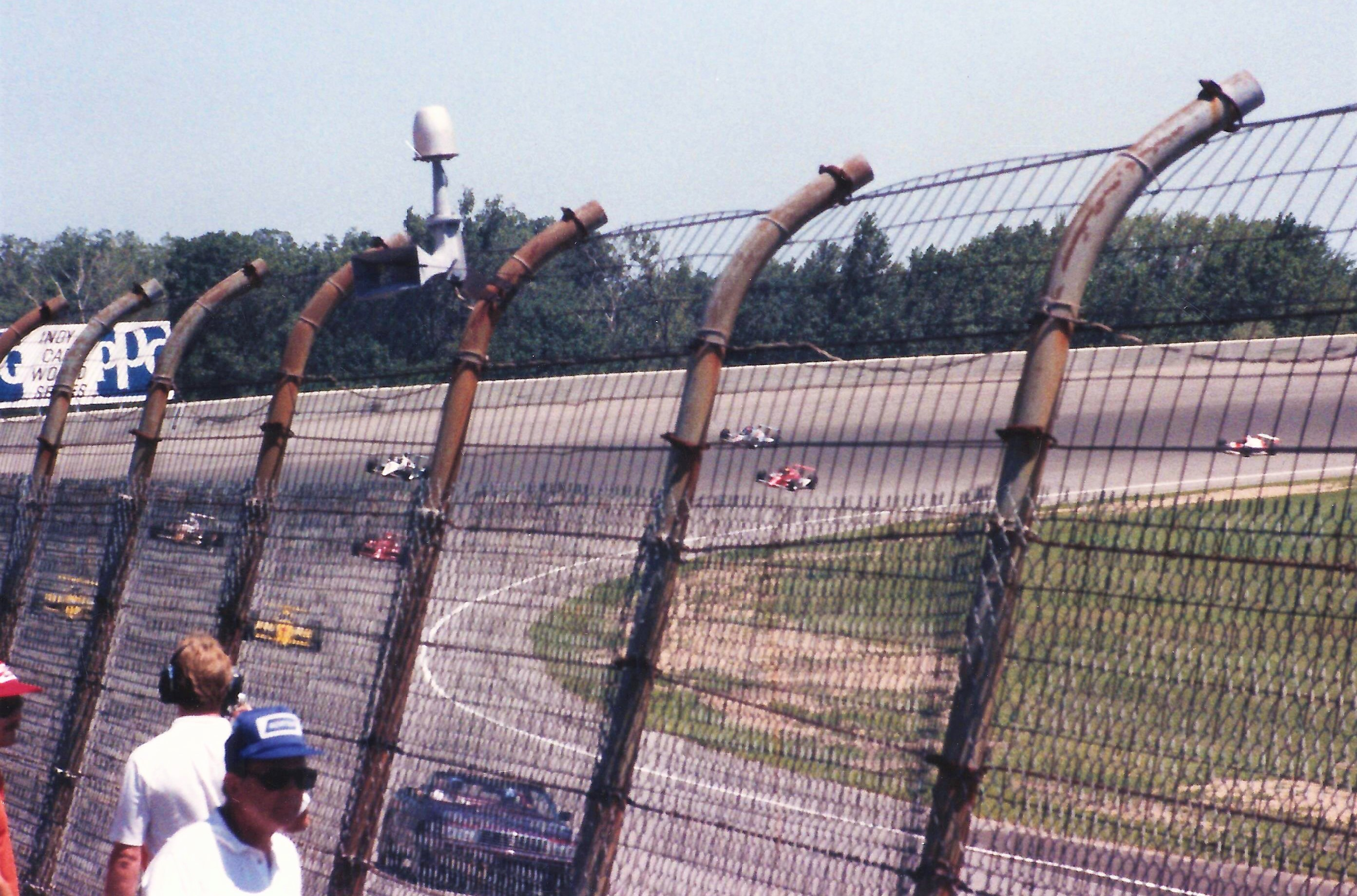
The pace car leads the field to the start of the 1988 Michigan 500.

In 1979, both the summer race and the fall race at Michigan switched to CART sanctioning.

At the end of the 1980 season, Ontario Motor Speedway closed. As a result, Indy car racing's "triple crown" (Indianapolis, Pocono, Ontario) lost one of its prestigious 500-mile races. For 1981, the summer race at Michigan was expanded to 500 miles, effectively replacing Ontario. NBC agreed to broadcast the race live, making it the first 500-mile Indy car race to be broadcast live.

During a private test session in November 1986, Rick Mears set an Indy car closed-course speed record driving a March 86C/Ilmor-Chevrolet with a lap of 233.934 mph. The lap was an Indy car speed record that would stand for a decade.

In 1987, the Michigan 500 secured the sponsorship of Marlboro and became known as the Marlboro 500. On network television, however due to tobacco regulations, the race was still advertised as the "Michigan 500." From 1988 to 1991 the race was part of the Marlboro Million, a cash prize awarded to any driver who won the Marlboro Grand Prix, the Marlboro 500, and the Marlboro Challenge All-Star event in the same year. The prize was never won.

During the 1980s and early 1990s, the Michigan 500 was traditionally held in late-July or early-August. The race was bookended by NASCAR races in mid-June and mid-August.

In 1994, the Brickyard 400 was scheduled for the first weekend in August, creating a conflict. The Michigan 500 was shifted to the last weekend in July for 1994 and beyond.

In several seasons (1987–1995, 1997), IROC was held as a support race to the Michigan 500. The Indy Lights series initially did not race at Michigan, but eventually made its first appearance in 1996.

Roger Penske sold the track to International Speedway Corporation in 1999. Over the next couple of seasons, attendance sharply declined for the CART-sanctioned race. In addition, the fast speeds were again raising safety concerns. The track had expanded its seating capacity (namely for its two NASCAR races) and the typical CART crowds of 50,000 spectators looked visibly unspectacular. Despite some of the most competitive CART events in the track's history, largely due to the use of the Hanford Device, fans continued to stay away. Series officials and track management were able to put together a deal to hold the 2001 race, but talks ceased and the contract was not renewed for 2002.

=== Indy Racing League / IndyCar ===
Starting in 2002, the race became an Indy Racing League/IndyCar Series event. In addition, the race distance was reduced from 500 miles to 400 miles. The race featured wheel-to-wheel racing, albeit at slower speeds than the CART-sanctioned events. In 2002, Sarah Fisher became the first female driver to pass for the lead under green flag conditions in an Indy-style race.

In 2007, the race had to switch dates once again. The Brickyard 400 was moved by ESPN up one week. The scheduling shuffle saw the Michigan race placed on the first weekend in August. The race was hampered by rain, and suffered a huge pileup. There were now three races in close proximity (Mid-Ohio, Michigan, and Detroit) within six weeks of each other. Citing low attendance, and an undesirable date, track management removed the race from the schedule in 2008 and beyond. In addition, a twin 200-mile race format was requested, which was rejected by the series officials. As of 2023, the race has not been revived.

== Second race ==
=== Fall race ===
From 1973 to 1986, Michigan International Speedway hosted two Indy car races annually. A fall/autumn race was held usually in mid-to-late September, about two months after the summer race. The length of the fall race varied over the years, but was always shorter that the more prominent 500-mile race held during the summer. The final running (1986) was scheduled for 125 laps/250 miles.

Following the 1986 CART season, the fall race was dropped from the schedule. That left the Michigan 500 (in either late-July or early-August) as the track's lone Indy car event.

=== U.S. 500 ===
In 1996, as a protest to the formation of the rival IRL (and specifically the reservation of starting spots in the 1996 Indianapolis 500 to IRL-based entries), the CART series scheduled a competing race on the same day as the Indy 500. Dubbed the U.S. 500, it was held at Michigan International Speedway on May 26, 1996.

It marked the first and only time that two 500-mile races were held at Michigan in the same season. Jimmy Vasser won the 1996 edition, but it was discontinued after only one running. The U.S. 500 moniker, however, would be reused for a few years - used for the traditional July 500-mile race. The name "Marlboro 500" subsequently was switched to the new 500-mile race at Fontana.

== Safety concerns ==
Safety was always a concern at Michigan, primarily due to the high speeds and Armco barriers. The steep banking and rough pavement was treacherous on equipment, leading to frequent suspension failures, tire failures, blown engines, and crashes, many severe. Attrition in races at Michigan was always high, particularly in the 500-mile events. Crashes at Michigan ended – or effectively led to the end of – the driving careers of Chip Ganassi, Emerson Fittipaldi, Héctor Rebaque and Danny Sullivan. Likewise Merle Bettenhausen, Derek Daly, A. J. Foyt, Al Unser Jr., Al Unser Sr., Gordon Johncock, Mario Andretti and Bobby Rahal, among others, all suffered injuries from crashes. After a horrendous crash in 1980 which split his car in two, Tim Richmond soon after quit Indy car racing and switched to the NASCAR circuit.

In 1987, a dogleg chicane was hastily built in the middle of the backstretch to slow the cars down, but it was never used in competition. After a couple of practice runs, it was deemed unsuitable, partially due to fear of gearbox failure, being too abrupt, and not necessarily serving its intended purpose. But it was also scrapped due to concern over fans' negative reactions. Instead, officials decided to reduce turbocharger boost for the race.

Despite the numerous serious crashes, no Indy car drivers have ever been killed as a result of crashes at Michigan. In the late 1980s and early 1990, safety upgrades were made the facility. The remaining Armco barriers were replaced with concrete walls, and the track was repaved in 1995. Though the track was still hard on equipment, the number of serious injuries to drivers noticeably declined. In the mid-2000s, SAFER Barriers were installed in the turns.

In addition to crashes that damaged or ended the careers of drivers, three spectators were killed in a 1998 CART racing incident. The 1998 U.S. 500 Presented by Toyota was marred by a crash on lap 175. Adrián Fernández slammed into the outside wall in the fourth turn. His right front wheel was torn off and hurled over the fence into the stands, killing three spectators (Kenneth Fox, Sheryl Laster, and Michael Tautkus) and injuring six others. Despite improvements made to the catch fencing, subsequent attendance declined greatly over the next few years.

== First wins and best-career results ==
Due to the demanding nature of the course and high attrition, particularly in the 500-mile races, Michigan produced numerous surprise winners and was the site of several first-time winners on the Indy car circuit. During the USAC era, Michigan was site of the only championship car wins for Ronnie Bucknum and Bill Vukovich II, as well as the first career wins for Tom Sneva and Danny Ongais. In the CART era, the Michigan 500 was the site of the first career wins for Pancho Carter (only career win), John Paul Jr., Emerson Fittipaldi, Scott Goodyear, Scott Pruett, Tony Kanaan, and Patrick Carpentier. Tomas Scheckter notched his first career IndyCar win while the race was under IRL sanctioning.

Other "surprise" wins included Johnny Rutherford's 1986 Michigan 500 triumph – his final career victory, and Scott Goodyear's 1994 win, the lone win for King Racing in Indy car racing. Along with the first-time winners, a number of other drivers on the Indy car circuit achieved their career-best finishes at Michigan. Examples include Josele Garza (2nd in 1986), Phil Krueger (5th in 1988) and Dominic Dobson, Mark Smith, and Hiro Matsushita, who finished 3rd, 5th, and 6th, respectively in the 1994 race. Derek Daly, who suffered a devastating crash at Michigan in 1984, scored his final career top five at Michigan in 1989.

Two-time Indy 500 winner Arie Luyendyk finished second twice at the Michigan 500 (1991, 1994). Notably, both instances were with fledgling teams. His second place in the 1994 race marked the best finish ever achieved by the Indy Regency Racing team. The two drivers that won the Michigan 500 twice in their careers (Michael Andretti and Scott Goodyear), have a similar footnote in that neither ever won the Indianapolis 500. Goodyear finished second twice at Indy, and likewise Andretti's best finish was only second place.

== Past winners ==
=== 500-mile race / Summer race ===
| Season | Date | Race Name | Driver | Team | Chassis | Engine | Race Distance | | Race Time | Average Speed (mph) | Report |
| Season | Date | Race Name | Driver | Team | Chassis | Engine | Laps | Miles (km) | Race Time | Average Speed (mph) | Report |
USAC Championship Car
| 1970 | July 4 | Michigan Twin 200s | (United States) Gary Bettenhausen | Bettenhausen Racing | Gerhardt | Offy | 100 | 200 (321.868) | 1:25:20 | 138.67 | Report |
| 1971 | July 18 | Michigan 200 | (United States) Mark Donohue | Penske Racing | McLaren | Offy | 100 | 200 (321.868) | 1:22:09 | 144.898 | Report |
| 1972 | July 16 | Michigan 200 | (United States) Joe Leonard | Vel's Parnelli Jones Racing | Parnelli | Offy | 100 | 200 (321.868) | | 140.685 | Report |
| 1973 | July 15 | Michigan 200 | (United States) Roger McCluskey | Lindsey Hopkins Racing | McLaren | Offy | 100 | 200 (321.868) | 1:14:28 | 161.146 | Report |
| 1974 | July 21 | Michigan 200 | (United States) Bobby Unser | All American Racers | Eagle | Offy | 100 | 200 (321.868) | 1:14:41 | 160.695 | Report |
| 1975 | July 20 | Michigan 150 | (United States) A. J. Foyt | A. J. Foyt Enterprises | Coyote | Foyt | 100 | 200 (321.868) | 1:15:31 | 158.907 | Report |
| 1976 | July 18 | Norton Twin 200s | (United States) Gordon Johncock | Patrick Racing | Wildcat | DGS | 100 | 200 (321.868) | 1:12:43 | 1:12:43 | Report |
| 1977 | July 17 | Norton 200 | (United States) Danny Ongais | Interscope Racing | Parnelli | Cosworth | 100 | 200 (321.868) | 1:20:27 | 149.152 | Report |
| 1978 | July 16 | Norton Twin 200 | (United States) Johnny Rutherford | Bruce McLaren Motor Racing | McLaren | Cosworth | 100 | 200 (321.868) | 1:15:02 | 159.941 | Report |
CART Championship Car
| 1979 | July 15 | Norton Twin 125s | (United States) Gordon Johncock | Patrick Racing | Penske | Cosworth | 63 | 126 (202.777) | 0:44:13 | 170.796 | Report |
| 1979 | July 15 | Norton Twin 125s | (United States) Bobby Unser | Penske Racing | Penske | Cosworth | 63 | 126 (202.777) | 0:48:40 | 155.342 | Report |
| 1980 | July 20 | Norton 200 | (United States) Johnny Rutherford | Chaparral Cars | Chaparral | Cosworth | 100 | 200 (321.868) | 1:20:48 | 148.515 | Report |
| 1981 | July 25 | Norton Michigan 500 | (United States) Pancho Carter | Alex Morales Autosport | Penske | Cosworth | 250 | 500 (804.672) | 3:45:45 | 132.89 | Report |
| 1982 | July 18 | Norton Michigan 500 | (United States) Gordon Johncock | Patrick Racing | Wildcat | Cosworth | 250 | 500 (804.672) | 3:14:54 | 153.925 | Report |
| 1983 | July 17 | Norton Michigan 500 | (United States) John Paul Jr. | VDS | Penske | Cosworth | 250 | 500 (804.672) | 3:42:27 | 134.862 | Report |
| 1984 | July 22 | Michigan 500 | (United States) Mario Andretti | Newman/Haas Racing | Lola | Cosworth | 250 | 500 (804.672) | 3:44:45 | 133.482 | Report |
| 1985 | July 28 | Michigan 500 | (Brazil) Emerson Fittipaldi | Patrick Racing | March | Cosworth | 250 | 500 (804.672) | 3:53:58 | 128.22 | Report |
| 1986 | August 2 | Michigan 500 | (United States) Johnny Rutherford | Alex Morales Autosport | March | Cosworth | 250 | 500 (804.672) | 3:38:45 | 137.139 | Report |
| 1987 | August 2 | Marlboro 500 | (United States) Michael Andretti | Kraco Racing | March | Cosworth | 250 | 500 (804.672) | 2:54:56 | 171.493 | Report |
| 1988 | August 7 | Marlboro 500 | (United States) Danny Sullivan | Penske Racing | Penske | Chevrolet | 250 | 500 (804.672) | 2:46:03 | 180.654 | Report |
| 1989 | August 6 | Marlboro 500 | (United States) Michael Andretti | Newman/Haas Racing | Lola | Chevrolet | 250 | 500 (804.672) | 3:07:15 | 160.21 | Report |
| 1990 | August 5 | Marlboro 500 | (United States) Al Unser Jr. | Galles/Kraco Racing | Lola | Chevrolet | 250 | 500 (804.672) | 2:38:07 | 189.727 | Report |
| 1991 | August 4 | Marlboro 500 | (United States) Rick Mears | Penske Racing | Penske | Chevrolet | 250 | 500 (804.672) | 2:59:23 | 167.23 | Report |
| 1992 | August 2 | Marlboro 500 | (Canada) Scott Goodyear | Walker Racing | Lola | Chevrolet | 250 | 500 (804.672) | 2:48:53 | 177.265 | Report |
| 1993 | August 1 | Marlboro 500 | (United Kingdom) Nigel Mansell | Newman/Haas Racing | Lola | Ford-Cosworth | 250 | 500 (804.672) | 2:39:24 | 188.203 | Report |
| 1994 | July 31 | Marlboro 500 | (Canada) Scott Goodyear | King Racing | Lola | Ford-Cosworth | 250 | 500 (804.672) | 3:07:44 | 159.8 | Report |
| 1995 | July 30 | Marlboro 500 | (United States) Scott Pruett | Patrick Racing | Lola | Ford-Cosworth | 250 | 500 (804.672) | 3:07:52 | 159.676 | Report |
| 1996 | May 26 | U.S. 500 | (United States) Jimmy Vasser | Chip Ganassi Racing | Reynard | Honda | 250 | 500 (804.672) | 3:11:48 | 156.403 | Report |
| 1996 | July 28 | Marlboro 500 | (Brazil) André Ribeiro | Tasman Racing | Lola | Honda | 250 | 500 (804.672) | 3:16:33 | 152.627 | Report |
| 1997 | July 27 | U. S. 500 Presented by Toyota | (Italy) Alex Zanardi | Chip Ganassi Racing | Reynard | Honda | 250 | 500 (804.672) | 2:59:35 | 167.044 | Report |
| 1998 | July 26 | U. S. 500 Presented by Toyota | (Canada) Greg Moore | Forsythe Racing | Reynard | Mercedes | 250 | 500 (804.672) | 3:00:48 | 165.913 | Report |
| 1999 | July 25 | U. S. 500 Presented by Toyota | (Brazil) Tony Kanaan | Forsythe Racing | Reynard | Honda | 250 | 500 (804.672) | 2:41:12 | 186.097 | Report |
| 2000 | July 23 | Michigan 500 Presented by Toyota | (Colombia) Juan Montoya | Chip Ganassi Racing | Lola | Toyota | 250 | 500 (804.672) | 2:48:49 | 177.694 | Report |
| 2001 | July 22 | Harrah's 500 Presented by Toyota | (Canada) Patrick Carpentier | Forsythe Racing | Reynard | Ford-Cosworth | 250 | 500 (804.672) | 2:54:55 | 171.498 | Report |
Indy Racing League / IndyCar Series
| 2002 | July 28 | Michigan Indy 400 | (South Africa) Tomas Scheckter | Team Cheever | Dallara | Infiniti | 200 | 400 (643.737) | 2:14:03 | 179.044 | Report |
| 2003 | July 27 | Firestone Indy 400 | (United States) Alex Barron | Mo Nunn Racing | G-Force | Toyota | 200 | 400 (643.737) | 2:12:39 | 180.917 | Report |
| 2004 | August 1 | Michigan Indy 400 | (United States) Buddy Rice | Rahal Letterman Racing | G-Force | Honda | 200 | 400 (643.737) | 2:11:47 | 182.123 | Report |
| 2005 | July 31 | Michigan Indy 400 | (United States) Bryan Herta | Andretti Green Racing | Dallara | Honda | 200 | 400 (643.737) | 2:23:33 | 167.197 | Report |
| 2006 | July 30 | Firestone Indy 400 | (Brazil) Hélio Castroneves | Team Penske | Dallara | Honda | 200 | 400 (643.737) | 2:03:44 | 193.972 | Report |
| 2007 | August 5 | Firestone Indy 400 | (Brazil) Tony Kanaan | Andretti Green Racing | Dallara | Honda | 200 | 400 (643.737) | 2:49:38 | 141.481 | Report |

=== Fall race ===
| Season | Date | Race Name | Driver | Team | Chassis | Engine | Race Distance | | Race Time | Average Speed (mph) | Report |
| Season | Date | Race Name | Driver | Team | Chassis | Engine | Laps | Miles (km) | Race Time | Average Speed (mph) | Report |
USAC Championship Car history
| 1968 | October 13 | Michigan Inaugural 250 | (United States) Ronnie Bucknum | All American Racers | Eagle | Offy | 125 | 250 (402.336) | 1:32:42 | 161.812 | Report |
| 1973 | September 16 | Michigan Twin 125s | (United States) Bill Vukovich Jr. | Jerry O'Connell Racing | Eagle | Offy | 63 | 126 (202.777) | 0:56:24 | 134.026 | Report |
| 1973 | September 16 | Michigan Twin 125s | (United States) Johnny Rutherford | Bruce McLaren Motor Racing | McLaren | Offy | 63 | 126 (202.777) | 0:48:05 | 157.243 | Report |
| 1974 | September 15 | Norton 250 | (United States) Al Unser | Vel's Parnelli Jones Racing | Eagle | Offy | 125 | 250 (402.336) | 1:45:32 | 142.135 | Report |
| 1975 | September 13 | Michigan 150 | (United States) Tom Sneva | Penske Racing | McLaren | Offy | 75 | 150 (241.401) | 0:51:05 | 176.16 | Report |
| 1976 | September 18 | Michigan 150 | (United States) A. J. Foyt | A. J. Foyt Enterprises | Coyote | Foyt | 75 | 150 (241.401) | 0:54:51 | 164.058 | Report |
| 1977 | September 17 | Michigan Grand Prix | (United States) Gordon Johncock | Patrick Racing | Wildcat | DGS | 75 | 150 (241.401) | 0:51:21 | 175.25 | Report |
| 1978 | September 16 | Gould Grand Prix | (United States) Danny Ongais | Interscope Racing | Parnelli | Cosworth | 75 | 150 (241.401) | 1:01:32 | 146.246 | Report |
CART Indy Car World Series history
| 1979 | September 15 | Gould Grand Prix | (United States) Bobby Unser | Penske Racing | Penske | Cosworth | 75 | 150 (241.401) | 0:51:22 | 175.211 | Report |
| 1980 | October 20 | Gould Grand Prix | (United States) Mario Andretti | Penske Racing | Penske | Cosworth | 75 | 150 (241.401) | 0:53:44 | 167.494 | Report |
| 1981 | September 20 | Detroit News Grand Prix | (United States) Rick Mears | Penske Racing | Penske | Cosworth | 74* | 148 (238.182) | 1:10:30 | 125.957 | Report |
| 1982 | September 26 | Detroit News Grand Prix | (United States) Bobby Rahal | TrueSports | March | Cosworth | 75 | 150 (241.401) | 1:04:03 | 140.515 | Report |
| 1983 | September 18 | Detroit News Grand Prix | (United States) Rick Mears | Penske Racing | Penske | Cosworth | 100 | 200 (321.868) | 1:05:49 | 182.235 | Report |
| 1984 | September 24 | Detroit News Grand Prix | (United States) Mario Andretti | Newman/Haas Racing | Lola | Cosworth | 100 | 200 (321.868) | 1:11:12 | 168.523 | Report |
| 1985 | September 22 | Detroit News 200 | (United States) Bobby Rahal | TrueSports | March | Cosworth | 100 | 200 (321.868) | 1:13:19 | 163.647 | Report |
| 1986 | September 28 | Pepsi-Cola 250 | (United States) Bobby Rahal | TrueSports | March | Cosworth | 125 | 250 (402.336) | 1:22:33 | 181.701 | Report |

- 1981: Race shortened due to scoring error.

=== Indy Lights winners ===
| Season | Date | Winning driver |
CART PPG Indy Lights
| 1996 | May 25 | (Canada) David Empringham |
| 1998 | July 25 | (United States) Tony Renna |
| 1999 | July 24 | (Austria) Philipp Peter |
| 2000 | July 22 | (Brazil) Felipe Giaffone |
IRL Indy Pro Series
| 2002 | July 28 | (United States) A. J. Foyt IV |
| 2003 | July 27 | (United Kingdom) Mark Taylor |
| 2004 | August 1 | (United States) P. J. Chesson |

== Race summaries ==
=== USAC ===
- 1968 (fall): Mario Andretti won the pole position with a speed of 183.976 mph for the inaugural event at the brand new Michigan International Speedway. A crowd of 55,108 arrived for the 125-lap, 250-mile race on the high-banked oval. The race became a pivotal battle for the 1968 USAC championship, namely between Mario Andretti and Bobby Unser. On lap 74, Mike Mosley was leading when Bobby Unser blew his engine. In a controversial move, Mosley was called into the pits and ordered to relinquish the car to Bobby Unser, in order that Unser could salvage championship points. The move handed the lead to Ronnie Bucknum, and put Unser two laps down. Andretti finished second, and Unser brought the Mosley car home third - running enough laps to score 109 championship points for himself, and he ultimately won the championship by a slim margin.
- 1970 (summer): USAC returned to Michigan after a one-year absence, for a 200-mile race on July 4. The race was part of a Saturday doubleheader with the USAC Stock Car series. Gary Bettenhausen (180.45 mph) won the pole position, with Mario Andretti (179.91 mph) qualifying second. During practice Thursday afternoon, however, Andretti wrecked his Hawk/Turbo-Ford in turn two. The team shipped the chassis back to Indianapolis, and was able to make late-night repairs, and the car was ready for race day on Saturday. Mario's day did not last long, however, as he blew a tire and spun out on lap 10. Gordon Johncock dominated the race, leading 82 of the first 91 laps. With 9 laps to go, however, Johncock's right rear wheel assembly broke off, sending him into the outside guardrail. Bettenhausen went low and slipped by the crashing car of Johncock to take the lead on lap 92. The raced finished under yellow with Bettenhausen the winner, and Bobby Unser second. A. J. Foyt placed 8th, then later won the USAC Stock Car race.
- 1971 (summer): Bobby Unser set a new track record of 193.444 mph to win the pole position. The track proved hard on equipment, as only eleven cars were still running at the finish. Bobby Unser led the first 15 laps, but dropped out with a blown engine. Mark Donohue took the lead on lap 16 and dominated the rest of the race. Donohue led 75 laps of the final 85 laps en route to victory.

=== Norton / Michigan 500 ===
- 1981: The inaugural Michigan 500 saw only 10 of 37 cars running at the finish. A total of 21 cars dropped out with mechanical failures, and crashes claimed four cars. A massive fire engulfed the pit area of Herm Johnson, stopping the race for over an hour. Pancho Carter survived the chaos to claim his first and only Indy car victory. A. J. Foyt suffered a serious compound fracture to his right arm after being pinned against the barrier at the exit of turn two.
- 1982: Patrick Racing teammates Gordon Johncock and Mario Andretti finished 1-2, with Johncock winning by a margin of 15 seconds - a sharp contrast from his victory two months earlier at Indianapolis. Andretti won the pole position, but wrecked his car in a practice run, and was forced to start last in a backup car. Driving in pain, and suffering handling difficulties, Andretti was unable to mount a challenge over the final 50 laps. For the second year in a row, A. J. Foyt was involved in a crash. On restart on lap 147, Héctor Rebaque swerved to avoid a slower car and lost control. He slammed into the path of Foyt, sending Foyt hard into the outside wall.
- 1983: A spectacular battle to the finish was besmirched by rain and multiple big wrecks. Rookie Teo Fabi, who had won the pole position at Indianapolis, followed that up with a pole at Michigan. Heavy rain and severe weather swept through the region on race morning, prompting a delay of the start. On lap 75, Fabi had just slipped by Gordon Johncock for the lead, with Kevin Cogan close behind in third. Going into turn three, a CV joint broke on Johncock's car, sending him hard, nose first, into the outside wall. Going high to try to avoid the crash, Cogan was collected in the incident and crashed also. Johncock suffered a fractured ankle and broken kneecap, but Cogan was not seriously injured. Tom Sneva was also taken out in the crash after he clipped the car of Patrick Bedard who spun trying to avoid the crash. On the final lap, race leader Rick Mears was attempting to lap Chris Kneifel down the backstretch but had lost some momentum coming off of turn two. Second place John Paul Jr. drafted behind, and caught Mears going into turn three. The cars went three-wide as Paul slipped under Mears practically on the apron entering turn three. Seconds later, Mears lost control, spun and hit the outside wall, and was subsequently t-boned by Kniefel as Paul went on to win. It was John Paul Jr.'s first win in an Indy car, and came after he had charged from 6th to 1st after the final round of pits and final restart on lap 219.
- 1984: The 1984 Michigan 500 was memorable for both its close finish, and for some of the most violent crashes in the history of the event. Phil Krueger and Chet Fillip both crashed hard around the halfway point of the race; Kruger was knocked unconscious but Fillip walked away; both drivers recovered. Chip Ganassi lost control coming out of turn two on lap 147, collecting Al Unser Jr. The two cars crashed hard into the infield guardrail, with Ganassi's car being launched into the air and tumbling upside-down along the backstretch infield, disintegrating into separate bits. Unser walked away with only minor injuries, but Ganassi was critically injured, and the accident curtailed his driving career. Polesitter Mario Andretti led the first five laps but dropped a cylinder and fell a lap down. Tom Sneva emerged as the leader late in the race, but Andretti had worked his way back to the front by lap 205, when Gary Bettenhausen spun in the middle of turn three. Howdy Holmes hit Bettenhausen's car and went partially underneath it. Bettenhausen's car spun on top of Holmes's car and nearly took Holmes's head off. Behind them, Bobby Rahal, who was leading the race, hit the brakes and was hit from behind by Al Holbert. All four drivers walked away. This moved Andretti into the lead, and when the green flag came out he battled nose-to-tail with Tom Sneva over the final ten laps. With the white flag waving, Sneva dove low for the lead in turn one, but Andretti held the position. Sneva regained the momentum, and coming out of turn four the two cars split a lapped car as they crossed the line. Andretti took the victory by 0.14 seconds. As the checkered flag waved, Pancho Carter was attempting to pass Rick Mears for third, but hit a bump and lost control. The car swerved into the guardrail and broke into two pieces, which then slid into the grass and tumbled violently down the backstretch. Carter suffered only minor injuries.
- 1985: Radial tires were introduced at the track for the first time. Bobby Rahal won the pole position with a track record of 215.202 mph, but a massive practice crash the day before the race destroyed his machine. Moments later, Roberto Guerrero blew out a tire, and both incidents were blamed on possible tire deficiencies. The race was postponed until the following Saturday, and run with the old bias-ply tires. On race day, Emerson Fittipaldi led Al Unser Sr. in the closing laps. Mario Andretti wrecked hard on lap 243, suffering a broken collarbone. That set up a sprint to the finish with the green and white flags coming out for the final lap. Unser Sr. could not get past the lapped car of Tom Sneva, and Fittipaldi held on for the win, his first win in CART Indy car competition, and his first race win since the 1975 British Grand Prix. Besides Andretti's crash, the race was also marred by a scoring snafu by CART officials. On a lap 82 restart, officials put the lapped car of Phil Krueger in the front of the pack by mistake. When the green came out, faster cars swerved to pass him, but Danny Ongais got caught up in the melee, and barrel-rolled down the backstretch.
- 1986: Rick Mears won the pole position with a lap of 223.401 mph, a new closed-course Indy car record, but crashed his car during a practice run the following day. Mears' car was repaired, but he eventually dropped out with a blown engine. Rain and attrition was the story of the day. After 18 laps, a heavy rain storm brought out a red flag and a 90-minute delay. After the restart, many cars dropped out including Roberto Guerrero, who crashed while leading on lap 47. Indy 500 winner Bobby Rahal came to the lead in the second half, with Johnny Rutherford having worked his way up to second. Rutherford took the lead on lap 196, and 25 laps later, Rahal's engine blew. Rutherford was now ahead by 25 seconds over Josele Garza, and running fast laps in the 217 mph range. A late caution set up a restart with four laps to go. The depleted field had only 7 cars still running, and Rutherford held off Garza to win by 1.82 seconds. It was Rutherford's 27th and final win of his career, and he became the first driver to win all four 500 miles races (Indianapolis, Ontario, Pocono, Michigan) in his career. It was also Garza's best career finish (2nd place). Al Unser Jr. somehow limped around to an 8th-place finish with no wings, a bashed nosecone, and an oil-cooler hastily wired to the gearbox.

=== Marlboro 500 ===
- 1987: In an effort to slow the cars down, allowable turbocharger boost was reduced from 48 to 45 inHG. Michael Andretti (215.530 mph) nipped A. J. Foyt for the pole, but fell far short of Rick Mears' record of 223 mph year earlier. Mario and Michael Andretti combined to lead 247 of the 250 laps. Mario lapped the field, but blew his engine on lap 156. Michael Andretti assumed the lead, also having lapped the rest of the field. With 8 laps to go, Michael Andretti led Indy 500 winner Al Unser Sr. and Bobby Rahal. Andretti needed to make his final pit stop, but a faulty clutch nearly cost him the race. Andretti's car sputtered and nearly stalled as he pulled away from his pit stall. Back on the track, Michael clung to a 9-second lead over Unser, and scored his first victory in a 500-mile event. With the win, Mario and Michael Andretti became the first father and son duo to win the Michigan 500. After several years of crashes, the 1987 race was run relatively clean with only one accident, and a record average speed of 171.490 mph.
- 1988: Danny Sullivan gave car owner Roger Penske his first-ever victory in the Michigan 500. Only 8 of the 28 starters were running at the finish, but only one driver was involved in a crash. Derek Daly slammed the outside wall in turn three, but was uninjured. Penske Racing teammates Rick Mears, Sullivan, and Al Unser Sr. were running 1-2-3 at the halfway point, but Mears broke a driveshaft on lap 155. Unser spun out in the pits on lap 140, and later suffered a blown engine. Sullivan lapped the field, and Bobby Rahal finished second with the Judd engine.
- 1989: Michael Andretti spun out exiting the pit area on lap 76, was assessed a stop-and-go penalty for allegedly passing under the caution, but still found himself in contention for the win in the latter stages. On lap 202, Andretti and Rick Mears were leaving the pits during a yellow when Mears accused Andretti of passing him illegally under the caution. Officials denied the Mears protest, and it became moot as Mears re-took the lead on lap 232. With less than ten laps to go, Mears suddenly slowed with a suspension failure, handing Michael Andretti the victory. Mario Andretti came home third, nipped at the line by second place Teo Fabi, who drove to Porsche's best ever 500-mile result.
- 1990: The fastest 500-mile race in Michigan history unfolded with the Ilmor Chevrolet-powered machines dominating. The grueling pace saw many leaders drop out with engine failures, including Emerson Fittipaldi, Arie Luyendyk, and Rick Mears. Galles/KRACO Racing teammates Al Unser Jr. and Bobby Rahal were left alone on the lead lap, and battled fiercely over the final 100 miles. With less than 15 laps to go, both Unser and Rahal needed one final pit stop for fuel. Rahal ducked into the pits first, but seconds later a caution came out, trapping Rahal a lap down. Unser Jr. got the benefit of pitting under yellow, and cruised over the final 10 laps to score his first victory in a 500-mile race.
- 1991: Arie Luyendyk and car owner Vince Granatelli missed practice and qualifying on Friday, as they battled an injunction order from car co-owner Bob Tezak. Luyendyk won the battle in court, and qualified for the field on Saturday, although he had to start in the final row. During the race, Luyendyk charged to the front and led 52 laps. On lap 186, however, Luyendyk was issued a stop-and-penalty for jumping a restart and passing cars before the green light came on. The penalty put Rick Mears in control, and Luyendyk almost a lap down. With 20 laps to go, a caution bunched the field, and allowed Luyendyk one last chance at Mears. Luyendyk was no match, however, and Mears claimed victory, sweeping both the Indianapolis 500 and Michigan 500, the final two wins of his career. Rookie Paul Tracy's Penske Racing debut ended against the wall on lap 3.
- 1992: Canadians Scott Goodyear and Paul Tracy survived an attrition-filled race and battled to the finish, each looking for their first-career Indy car win. On his final pit stop, Goodyear snapped off a pneumatic jack, which would have made subsequent tire changes difficult. After the final restart, Goodyear passed Tracy with 17 laps to go on the outside of turn two, using third place Raul Boesel to draft by. Goodyear held on to win his first career race, avenging the disappointing loss at Indianapolis two months earlier. The race also marked the final career start for Rick Mears. Mears dropped out with nagging pain in his wrist due to injuries suffered at Indianapolis. He sat out the rest of the season, and unexpectedly retired at year's end. During qualifying, Mario Andretti (230.150 mph) set a new track record, the first lap at Michigan ever over 230 mph.
- 1993: Nigel Mansell lapped the field by the midway point setting a blistering pace running laps in 225 mph range. But the rough, demanding circuit took a physical toll on Mansell, who became ill with a headache, a sore wrist, and exhaustion. Mansell led 221 of the 250 laps, dominating in his first victory in a 500-mile race. Mansell's Newman-Haas teammate Mario Andretti finished second, capping off a 1-2 sweep for the Ford Cosworth XB engine. Andretti's pole speed of 234.275 mph was also an all-time Indy car record.
- 1994: Nigel Mansell, in what would be his final superspeedway race, won the pole position at 233.738 mph. With the starting grid lined up (for the first time in several years) in rows of three, Ford-Cosworth teams swept the first five spots. Mansell led early, but dropped out with a jammed throttle. Several other contenders dropped out, including Michael Andretti, Mario Andretti, Robby Gordon, and Emerson Fittipaldi. Raul Boesel came to the lead, looking for his first career win, and first win for Dick Simon Racing. Boesel led 120 laps, but lost power with just 25 laps to go. The lead was inherited by Indianapolis 500 winner Al Unser Jr. Scott Goodyear was holding second, a lap down due to running out of fuel on lap 170. But only six laps later on lap 231, Unser's engine blew, handing the lead and the win to Scott Goodyear. It was Goodyear's second win in the Michigan 500, and the first and only Indy car win for King Racing. With only eight cars still running, Arie Luyendyk (started 26th) finished 2nd for Indy Regency Racing. Dominic Dobson (3rd) and Mark Smith (5th) achieved their best-career finishes.
- 1995: The track was repaved during the offseason. Scott Pruett and Al Unser Jr. ran 1st-2nd in the closing laps. Unser passed Pruett for the lead going into turn one at the white flag, but Pruett tucked in behind to draft. Coming out of turn four, Pruett made a slingshot pass to beat Unser at the line by 0.056 seconds. it was Pruett's first career Indy car win, and the first win for Firestone tires since 1974. Danny Sullivan suffered a fractured pelvis in a crash, and soon after, retired from driving.
- 1996 (July): On the first lap, Emerson Fittipaldi clipped wheels with Greg Moore, sending Fittipaldi's car hard into the wall in turn two. Fittipaldi suffered a fractured vertebra, a fractured shoulder blade, and a partially collapsed lung, which proved to be career-ending injuries. Several race leaders dropped out, with André Ribeiro dodging debris and avoiding problems to lead most of the second half. With 8 laps to go, Ribeiro held off Bryan Herta and Maurício Gugelmin on a restart and took the victory by a 1.3 second margin.

=== U.S. 500 ===
- 1996 (May): The open wheel "split" prompted the CART-based teams to hold an alternative race to the Indy 500, the U.S. 500 at Michigan on Memorial Day weekend. At the start, polesitter Jimmy Vasser and Adrián Fernández clipped wheels, collecting Bryan Herta, triggering a huge pileup, involving at least a dozen cars. The race was restarted with many teams electing to use backup cars. Several cars, including front-runners Alex Zanardi, Bryan Herta, and Greg Moore suffered blown engines. Parker Johnstone also dropped out of contention late, when he ran out of fuel. With 9 laps to go, leader André Ribeiro's suffered a fuel pickup problem, and he was forced to duck into the pits for a splash-and-go stop. Ribeiro's car - one of the backup cars rolled out - did not have proper working fuel telemetry, leaving the crew unsure of their fuel situation. Jimmy Vasser led the final 9 laps to victory.
- 1997: The U.S. 500 moniker was given the July 500-mile race, after the Memorial Day weekend event was discontinued after only one edition. Alex Zanardi survived a pit mishap and a subsequent penalty to come back and win by an impressive 31-second margin. On lap 33, Zanardi stalled his engine in the pits, then ran over his teammate Jimmy Vasser's airhose, for which he was issued a drive-through penalty. The field dwindled from 28 starters to only 11 cars running at the finish. Zanardi steadily climbed to the front, and led 93 of the final 98 laps.
- 1998: The race was marred by a crash on lap 175. Adrián Fernández slammed into the outside wall in the fourth turn. His right front wheel was torn off and hurled over the fence into the grandstands, killing three spectators (Kenneth Fox, Sheryl Laster, and Michael Tautkus) and injuring six others. Back on the track, the racing was among the most spectacular in the 20-year history of CART. The Hanford Device was used for the first time, which produced close racing, drafting, and a record-shattering 62 lead changes. The top four cars crossed the finish line separated by only 0.518 seconds. Greg Moore passed Jimmy Vasser going into turn one on the final lap, and held on for the victory.
- 1999: Max Papis led by 3 seconds at the white flag but shockingly ran out of fuel in turn three. Tony Kanaan screamed by to take the lead, but was closely followed by Juan Pablo Montoya. At the stripe, Montoya attempted a slingshot pass, but Kanaan made a block and held on to win by 0.032 seconds. It was Kanaan's first-career Indy car win, and stands as the closest finish in a 500-mile race in Indy car racing history.

=== Michigan / Harrah's 500 Presented by Toyota ===
- 2000: Juan Pablo Montoya beat Michael Andretti at the finish line by 0.040 seconds. The two cars battled for the lead over the last several laps, with Andretti taking the lead on lap 249. Going into turn one on the final lap, Montoya drafted by to take the lead, but Andretti pulled back alongside going into turn three. Side by side out of turn four, the two cars nearly touched, and Montoya on the outside benefited from a draft off the car of Tarso Marques. Montoya edged just ahead at the stripe to take the win. The race saw 52 official lead changes, and lap speeds in the 220-230 mph range. Montoya became the first driver since Rick Mears in 1991 to win both the Indianapolis 500 and Michigan 500 in the same year.
- 2001: The final CART series race at Michigan saw 60 lead changes among 11 drivers, and a wild five-car shootout for the win. On the final lap, Patrick Carpentier, Dario Franchitti, and Michel Jourdain Jr. were running in the top three. Carpentier's teammate Alex Tagliani was a lap down in sixth, but in the lead pack. Going into turn one, Tagliani drafted past the leaders and was in front of the pack. Down the backstretch, Tagliani slid over to give Carpentier the lead, blocking Jourdain. Going into turn three, Jourdain slid up the banking, and nearly touched wheels with Franchitti. Carpentier broke away and won his first career Indy car race. Michel Jourdain Jr. beat Dario Franchitti for second place by two inches.

=== Firestone Indy 400 ===
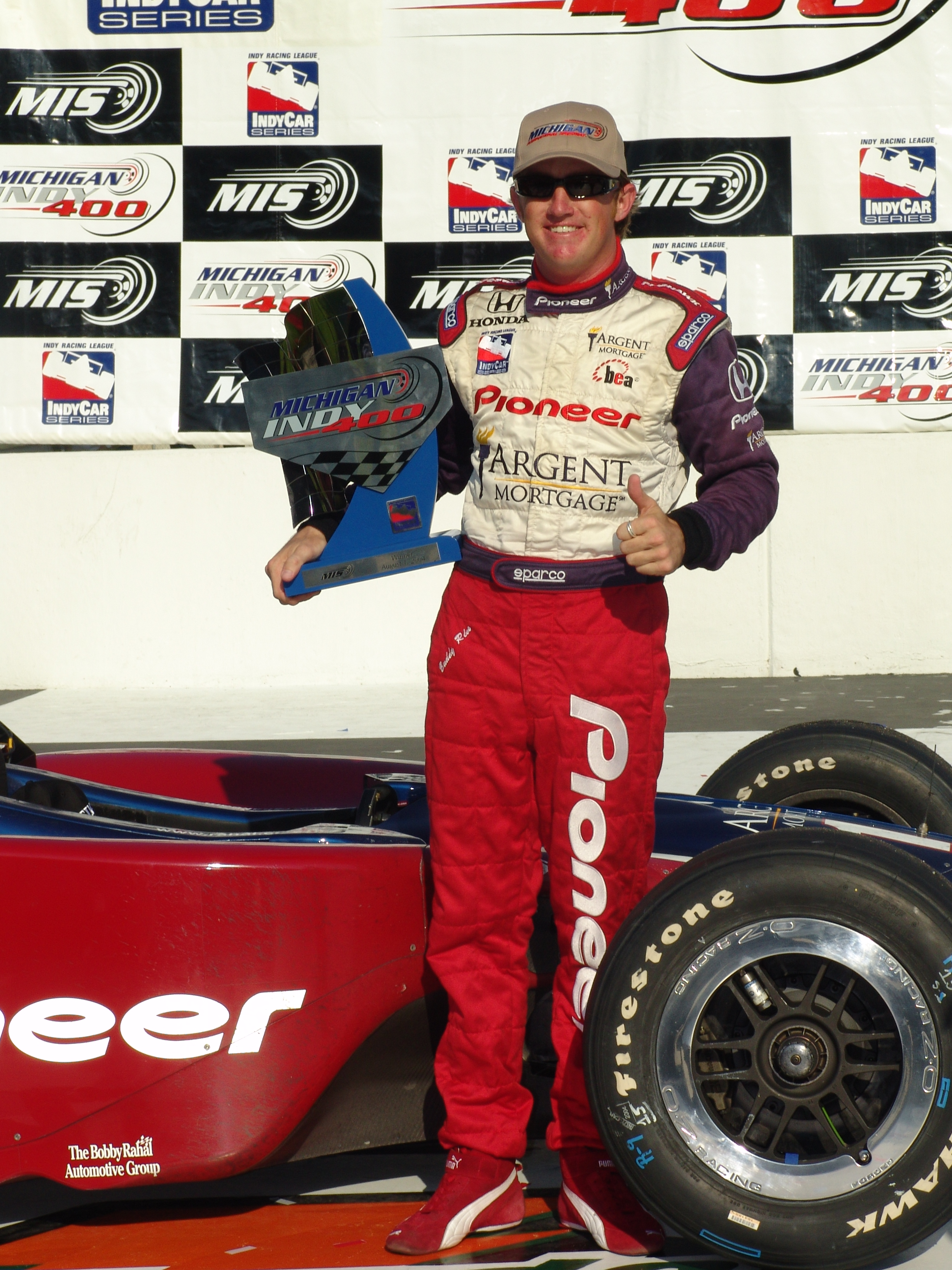
Buddy Rice won the 2004 race.

- 2002: The race switched to become an Indy Racing League event, and the distance was changed to 400 miles (200 laps). After crashing while leading the Indianapolis 500, and after many struggles by the team up to that point, rookie Tomas Scheckter won the pole and dominated much of the race. Cheever Racing teammates Scheckter and Buddy Rice finished 1st-2nd. With 16 laps to go, Sarah Fisher passed Felipe Giaffone for the lead, the first time a female driver had made a pass for the lead in an Indy car race under green flag conditions. Scheckter and Rice, both mired in traffic, paired up and together charged back to the front in the closing laps. It was Scheckter's first career IndyCar win.
- 2003: On lap 164, Sam Hornish Jr., Tomas Scheckter, and Alex Barron were battling for the lead, almost three-wide going into turn three. On the frontstretch, Barron and Scheckter touched wheels, sending Barron's car spinning to the infield grass. The car spun back up the banking, and Barron was able to drive away unscathed. On the final lap, Hornish led Barron down the backstretch. Barron went to the outside in turn three and the two cars were side by side coming out of turn four. Barron edged Hornish at the finish line by 0.0121 seconds for the win.
- 2004: Tony Kanaan led 183 of the first 189 laps, but with 11 laps to go, gave up the lead to Buddy Rice. In order to conserve fuel and make it to the finish, Kanaan let Rice by, as the Andretti Green crew believed Rice would run out of fuel before the checkered flag. Rice stretched his fuel, and won, sweeping both Indianapolis and Michigan for the season.
- 2005: Bryan Herta dominated the race, leading 159 of 200 laps, but a late-race caution set up a six-lap dash to the checkered flag. Herta's Andretti Green Racing teammates Dan Wheldon and Tony Kanaan made it three-wide for the lead on lap 195, but Herta held off the challenge and scored the victory.
- 2006: Rain delayed the start by over two hours. Points leader Sam Hornish Jr. led 37 laps, but blew his engine on lap 61. Hélio Castroneves took the victory and the points lead at the end of the day. There were only two yellows for 10 laps, resulting in a Michigan record average speed of 193.972 mph.
- 2007: Rain delayed the start of the race for over four hours. On lap 139, Dario Franchitti and Dan Wheldon hooked wheels on the back-stretch, sending Franchitti sideways and sailing upside down, landing on the cars of Scott Dixon and A. J. Foyt IV, and collecting several other cars. Tony Kanaan held off teammate Marco Andretti at the finish line, and only seven cars were running at the finish.

== Notes ==
=== Works cited ===
- IndyCar.com - Official Site
- ChampCarStats.com
