= 2002 Infiniti Pro Series =

2002 Infiniti Pro Series season
- IRL Infiniti Pro Series

Season
- Races: 7
- Start date: July 7
- End date: September 14

Awards
- Drivers' champion: (United States) A. J. Foyt IV
- Teams' champion: A. J. Foyt Enterprises

The 2002 IRL Infiniti Pro Series was the first season of an official development series to the then-named Indy Racing League, and is considered as the 17th season of the Indy NXT open wheel auto racing series. The Infiniti Pro Series is officially considered a direct continuation of the original CART-owned Indy Lights series, which was created in 1986 as the American Racing Series and operated for 16 years. While the formation of the Pro Series was independent, CART announced shortly after that Indy Lights would fold after the 2001 season. The Pro Series would adopt the Indy Lights name in 2008 when IndyCar bought the intellectual property from CART, and was subsequently renamed Indy NXT in 2023.

A. J. Foyt IV, the youngest driver in the field, won the championship at the final race while taking his fourth race win of the season, in a car owned by his legendary grandfather A. J. Foyt. Foyt IV held the record as the youngest Indy NXT champion at 18 years and three months of age until Nikita Johnson in 2026.

== Series news ==
The Infiniti Pro Series was first announced on August 31, 2001, with the aim to streamline the path into IRL competition and provide a training ground for aspiring drivers. This was particularly aimed at addressing competitors from the USAC ranks that were having a harder time transitioning directly into the IRL in previous years. The season started halfway through the IRL season in the summer of 2002, with a reduced all-oval seven race schedule over two months before embarking on an extended calendar in 2003.

The series had a target budget of $750,000 per season and per car for a full 12-race season, featuring a spec chassis and a racing version of the V8 engine used in the Infiniti Q45, which produced 420 horsepower (310 kW). Shortly before the start of the season, the Japanese brand announced in June it would concentrate its efforts on the Infiniti Pro Series from 2003, signalling the end of their engine program in the Indy Racing League after 2002. Purses for the series were allocated at $100,000 per race, with $25,000 for the winner, all the way down to 20th place.

== Team and driver chart ==
All teams used Dallara IPS cars with a TWR produced Infiniti sourced 3.5 litre engine and Firestone tires. The following drivers and teams competed in the series.

Team	No.	Drivers	Rounds
Sinden Racing Service	2	(United States) Ed Carpenter	All
Brian Stewart Racing	3	(Canada) Marty Roth	1–4, 6–7
Luyendyk Racing	5	(Netherlands) Arie Luyendyk Jr.	All
Kelley Racing	7	(Canada) Jason Priestley	1–4
REV 1 Racing	8	(United States) Ronnie Johncox	All
Sam Schmidt Motorsports	9	(United States) Jeff Tillman	3
Sam Schmidt Motorsports	9	(Canada) Tom Wood	4, 6–7
Sam Schmidt Motorsports	9	(United States) Curtis Francois	5
Sam Schmidt Motorsports	99	(United States) G. J. Mennen	All
Roquin Motorsports	11	(Mexico) Rolando Quintanilla	2–7
Beardsley Motorsports	12	(United States) Matt Beardsley	2–5, 7
A. J. Foyt Enterprises	14	(United States) A. J. Foyt IV	All
Automatic Fire Sprinklers	27	(United States) Gary Peterson	All
Conti-Genoa-Frost Racing	34	(United States) Ryan Hampton	3–7
Bowes Seal Fast Racing	37	(United States) Mike Koss	1–4, 6–7
Bowes Seal Fast Racing	37	(New Zealand) Matt Halliday	5
Bowes Seal Fast Racing	38	(New Zealand) Matt Halliday	1
Bowes Seal Fast Racing	43	(United States) Dave Steele	3
Bowes Seal Fast Racing	43	(United States) Tony Turco	4–6
Hemelgarn 91/Johnson Motorsports	91	(United States) Aaron Fike	All
Hemelgarn 91/Johnson Motorsports	92	(United States) Cory Witherill	All

=== Teams and drivers announcements ===
- On November 29, 2001, former Indy Racing League champions Hemelgarn Racing became the first team to publicly commit to the Infiniti Pro Series in partnership with Roger Johnson, who also owned RE Technologies in the USAC Silver Crown series. The team was branded as Hemelgarn 91/Johnson Motorsports.
- On December 18, 2001, Genoa Racing entered the Infiniti Pro Series by announcing it had placed an order on a Dallara IPS chassis. Genoa had last competed in the Indy Lights series in 2000, and had also run the Knapp Motorsports operation in the Indy Racing League. Despite their early entry, the team would fail to enter the first two races of the season.
- On January 15, 2002, longtime motorsports team provider Sinden Racing Service announced it would field a car. Headed by team owner Jeff Sinden since 1987, the team had provided the workforce, engineering or operational efforts for various small Indy car teams, sometimes running the cars under their own banner.
- On January 24, 2002, Ed Carpenter became the first driver to be announced for the Infiniti Pro Series, driving for Sinden Racing Service with the support of long-time backer John Menard, owner of the championship-winning Team Menard. Carpenter stepped up from the USAC ranks, having finished 9th in his second season of full-time USAC Silver Crown competition.
- On February 11, 2002, Roquin Motorsports announced a two-car effort for the Infiniti Pro Series. However, the team would only field one car eventually throughout the course of the year. Owned by the Quintanilla racing family, Roquin was the first team to make the switch from the folded Indy Lights series.
- On February 13, 2002, Brian Stewart Racing announced a one-car program. The team had been a successful mainstay of the original Indy Lights series from 1988, although it had sat out most of the 2001 season due to a lack of funding.
- On March 3, 2002, former Indy Lights team Mexpro Racing announced its participation in the Infiniti Pro Series. However, the program stalled and the team did not take part at all during the season.
- On March 15, 2002, Hemelgarn 91/Johnson Motorsports announced their first driver to be Aaron Fike. He made the step up from USAC, where he had finished 5th in the Midget series and became the youngest ever race winner in Silver Crown history at the age of 19.
- On March 23, 2002, Hemelgarn 91/Johnson Motorsports completed its lineup with Cory Witherill, who had finished 12th in his fourth season of Indy Lights competition. Witherill had also driven in the Indy Racing League and Indianapolis 500 in 2001, with two starts to his name.
- On April 1, 2002, Brian Stewart Racing announced Marty Roth as the driver of their one-car team, reuniting 15 years after their joint venture in the Canadian Formula 2000 series. Aged 44, Roth was a former Indy Lights driver with 16 previous starts until 1991, before focusing on his real estate career.
- On April 12, 2002, Bowes Seal Fast Racing entered the series with a two-car operation, and announced Mike Koss as their first driver. Bowes Seal Fast had been involved in the Indianapolis 500 in multiple capacities since the 1930s, while Koss had been a sprint car driver at regional dirt tracks and the Little 500 before racing in a handful of United States Speedway Series events with an old Lola-Buick Indy car.
- On April 16, 2002, Kelley Racing became the second Indy Racing League team to field a car in the Infiniti Pro Series, by entering Jason Priestley. The Canadian, an actor-turned driver, had previous background in rallying and circuit racing at an amateur level, having driven in the Motorola Cup and the 24 Hours of Daytona in 1998.
- On May 6, 2002, Indianapolis 500 winner Arie Luyendyk announced the formation of Luyendyk Racing as a one-car team in the Infiniti Pro Series for his son Arie Luyendyk Jr., who stepped up from the USF2000 National Championship after finishing 9th in his second season, with a best finish of fourth in that period. The team would operate out of the Treadway Racing headquarters.
- On May 25, 2002, A. J. Foyt Racing announced it would enter the Infiniti Pro Series with A. J. Foyt IV, who turned 18 on that day. The grandson of team owner A. J. Foyt came from the SCCA Formula Continental, where he had finished third in the Southwest Regional division with six wins.
- On June 18, 2002, driver-owner Gary Peterson committed to the series through the Automatic Fire Sprinklers team. With a background in off-road racing, Peterson had been a regular competitor during the first half of the 1990s in the Atlantic Championship, where he had made two further starts in previous years.
- On June 28, 2002, former Indy Racing League driver Ronnie Johncox entered the series with his own newly formed team, REV 1 Racing. After eight starts in the IRL and failing to qualify for his first Indianapolis 500 in 2000, Johncox had gone back to his roots in a handful of midget racing events.
- On July 2, 2002, the announcement of the entry list for the inaugural race at Kansas Speedway featured three previously unannounced drivers and one previously unconfirmed team.
  - IRL team Sam Schmidt Motorsports fielded a car for G. J. Mennen, a former Barber Dodge Pro Series competitor who had dabbled in Trans-Am, GT and stock car racing since 1998, with one NASCAR Truck Series start.
  - Bowes Seal Fast Racing fielded its second car for Matt Halliday, who had finished 6th in Indy Lights competition the previous year despite missing the first three races, with two podium finishes.
  - Roquin Motorsports co-owner Rolando Quintanilla became the driver of the team's lone entry and reprised his role from 2001, when he finished 10th in his second Indy Lights season. Unlike Mennen or Halliday, Quintanilla did not take part in pre-season testing at Gateway Motorsports Park or Chicagoland Speedway in June, and elected to withdraw from the Kansas event before official practice.

=== Mid-season changes ===
- On July 15, 2002, Beardsley Motorsports announced it would enter the Infiniti Pro Series from the second round of the season at Nashville with driver Matt Beardsley, who had raced for the family team since karting. Beardsley had driven since 1998 in the SCCA Formula Mazda Series, winning the Oval Series championship twice.
- On July 24, 2002, the newly rebranded Conti-Genoa-Frost Racing announced Ryan Hampton as its first driver of the season, making his debut at the third round in Michigan. Hampton had finished second in USF2000 competition in 1998 and had raced since in Grand-Am sports cars, winning the title in the SRPII class in 2000.
- On July 25, 2002, Sam Schmidt Motorsports entered a second car for the Michigan event for driver Jeff Tillman, a veteran of SCCA and Grand-Am sports car racing who had finished 3rd in the Grand-Am standings of the SRPII class in 2001.
- On July 26, 2002, after the first practice session at Michigan, Bowes Seal Fast Racing announced Dave Steele as the driver of the renumbered No. 43 car in place of the injured Matt Halliday, who had suffered a broken wrist, a concussion, a fractured right ankle and bruised lungs in a hard crash at the Kansas race, and would miss three races. Steele had driven in a handful of Indy Racing League events in the late 1990s, having gone back since to regular title contention in the USAC Silver Crown Series.
- On August 8, 2002, the entry list for the Kentucky round featured Tom Wood in the No. 9 Sam Schmidt Motorsports car, previously driven by Jeff Tillman, while Bowes Seal Fast Racing entered Tony Turco in the No. 43 car. Wood had four years of USF2000 experience and had contested three races in the Atlantic Championship in 2001, while Turco was a veteran of the American Indycar Series, having famously failed to compete in the inaugural Indy Racing League event in 1996 due to a lack of funds.
- On August 16, 2002, Kelley Racing announced its withdrawal from the Infiniti Pro Series, five days after Jason Priestley suffered serious injuries after two head-on collisions at Kentucky Speedway during a warm-up crash. Priestley had surgeries for fractures in his back and both feet, as well as a concussion and extensive facial injuries. Eventually, the crash signalled the end of his open-wheel career.
- On August 20, 2002, Sam Schmidt Motorsports announced its third driver in as many races for the No. 9 car, with hometown driver Curtis Francois driving at Gateway. Francois had been teammates earlier that year with Jeff Tillman, another driver of the No. 9, in the SRPII class of the Grand-Am Series, and had previous experience in SCCA Formula Ford and Sports 2000 competition.
- For the fifth round at Gateway, Matt Halliday returned to Bowes Seal Fast Racing after recovering from his injuries. Instead of the renumbered No. 43 car, Halliday drove the No. 37 in place of full-time driver Mike Koss. The arrangement was scheduled to remain as such for the Chicagoland race, but Halliday was withdrawn and replaced by Koss prior to the start of practice. Koss was also the only driver of the team at the Texas finale.

== Schedule ==
The initial schedule for the Infiniti Pro Series was announced on February 2, 2002. Competition started halfway through the Indy Racing League season, which the Infiniti Pro Series accompanied at all of its final seven events, with all events being held on ovals. Kansas, Gateway and Texas had all been featured in the last season of Indy Lights competition, which had last visited Michigan in 2000, while Nashville, Kentucky and Chicagoland held an open-wheel feeder series race for the first time.

Rd.	Date	Race name	Track	Location
1	July 7	Kansas 100	Kansas Speedway	Kansas City, Kansas
2	July 20	Nashville 100	Nashville Superspeedway	Lebanon, Tennessee
3	July 28	Michigan 100	Michigan International Speedway	Brooklyn, Michigan
4	August 11	Kentucky 100	Kentucky Speedway	Sparta, Kentucky
5	August 25	St. Louis 100	Gateway International Raceway	Madison, Illinois
6	September 8	Chicago 100	Chicagoland Speedway	Joliet, Illinois
7	September 14	BG Products 100	Texas Motor Speedway	Fort Worth, Texas

== Race results ==
Round	Race	Pole position	Fastest lap	Most laps led	Race Winner	
Round	Race	Pole position	Fastest lap	Most laps led	Driver	Team
1	Kansas Speedway	(United States) A. J. Foyt IV	(Netherlands) Arie Luyendyk Jr.	(United States) A. J. Foyt IV	(United States) A. J. Foyt IV	A. J. Foyt Enterprises
2	Nashville Superspeedway	(United States) Ronnie Johncox	(United States) Aaron Fike	(United States) Cory Witherill	(United States) Cory Witherill	Hemelgarn 91/Johnson Motorsports
3	Michigan International Speedway	(Netherlands) Arie Luyendyk Jr.	(Canada) Jason Priestley	(United States) A. J. Foyt IV	(United States) A. J. Foyt IV	A. J. Foyt Enterprises
4	Kentucky Speedway	(United States) A. J. Foyt IV	(United States) Cory Witherill	(United States) A. J. Foyt IV	(United States) A. J. Foyt IV	A. J. Foyt Enterprises
5	Gateway International Raceway	(United States) Ryan Hampton	(United States) Ryan Hampton	(United States) Ryan Hampton	(United States) Ryan Hampton	Conti-Genoa-Frost Racing
6	Chicagoland Speedway	(United States) A. J. Foyt IV	(United States) Gary Peterson	(Netherlands) Arie Luyendyk Jr.	(United States) Aaron Fike	Hemelgarn 91/Johnson Motorsports
7	Texas Motor Speedway	(United States) A. J. Foyt IV	(Canada) Tom Wood	(United States) A. J. Foyt IV	(United States) A. J. Foyt IV	A. J. Foyt Enterprises

A. J. Foyt IV, the youngest driver in the field, was the inaugural champion in a car owned by his legendary, grandfather A. J. Foyt. Foyt IV held the record as the youngest Indy NXT champion at 18 years and three months of age until Nikita Johnson in 2026. Foyt IV won four of the seven races, including the inaugural event at Kansas, and was crowned at the final race in Texas against the American-born Dutch driver Arie Luyendyk Jr. The son of two-time Indianapolis 500 winner Arie Luyendyk had four second-place finishes, but no wins, finishing behind Cory Witherill at Nashville, Ryan Hampton at Gateway and Aaron Fike at Chicagoland.

Former IRL drivers Cory Witherill, Ronnie Johncox, and Dave Steele participated in the championship, alongside full-time IRL teams A. J. Foyt Enterprises, Kelley Racing, Hemelgarn Racing and Sam Schmidt Motorsports, although Kelley Racing withdrew from the championship after actor-turned-driver Jason Priestley was seriously injured in a warm-up crash at Kentucky Speedway. The series started with 12 cars at its first round, and the field was up to 16 drivers for the events at Michigan and Kentucky. Eight drivers took part in every round, with three others contesting all but one event.

== Championship standings ==
=== Drivers' Championship ===
Scoring system

Position	**1st**	**2nd**	**3rd**	**4th**	**5th**	**6th**	**7th**	**8th**	**9th**	**10th**	**11th**	**12th**	**13th**	**14th**	**15th**	**16th**
Points	50	40	35	32	30	28	26	24	22	20	19	18	17	16	15	14

- The driver who leads the most laps in a race is awarded two additional points.

Pos	Driver	KAN	NSH	MIS	KEN	GAT	CHI	TXS	Points
1	(United States) A. J. Foyt IV R	**1***	4	1*	**1***	9	**6**	**1***	290
2	(Netherlands) Arie Luyendyk Jr. R	10	2	**2**	6	2	2*	7	236
3	(United States) Ed Carpenter R	5	5	3	2	3	7	5	226
4	(United States) Cory Witherill	3	1*	15	3	11	13	2	213
5	(United States) Aaron Fike R	11	3	4	14	14	1	12	186
6	(United States) Ronnie Johncox	9	**12**	5	4	8	5	8	180
7	(United States) Gary Peterson	7	DNS	10	8	10	8	4	163
8	(United States) G. J. Mennen R	8	8	9	15	4	9	9	161
9	(United States) Ryan Hampton R			7	12	**1***	14	3	147
10	(Canada) Marty Roth	6	9	11	13		4	10	138
11	(Mexico) Rolando Quintanilla		11	6	7	6	10	14	137
12	(United States) Mike Koss R	4	10	16	11		11	11	123
13	(United States) Matt Beardsley R		7	14	5	12		13	107
14	(Canada) Jason Priestley R	2	6	13	DNS				99
15	(Canada) Tom Wood R				10		3	6	83
16	(United States) Tony Turco R				9	13	12		57
17	(New Zealand) Matt Halliday	12				7			44
18	(United States) Curtis Francois R					5			30
19	(United States) Dave Steele			8					24
20	(United States) Jeff Tillman R			12					18
Pos	Driver	KAN	NSH	MIS	KEN	GAT	CHI	TXS	Points

Color	Result
Gold	Winner
Silver	2nd place
Bronze	3rd place
Green	4th & 5th place
Light Blue	6th–10th place
Dark Blue	Finished (Outside Top 10)
Purple	Did not finish
Red	Did not qualify (DNQ)
Brown	Withdrawn (Wth)
Black	Disqualified (DSQ)
White	Did not start (DNS)
Blank	Did not participate (DNP)
Blank	Not competing

**In-line notation**
**Bold**	Pole position
Italics	Ran fastest race lap
*	Led most race laps (2 points)

- Ties in points broken by number of wins, or best finishes.
