= Rolando Quintanilla =

Mexican racing driver (born 1977)

Rolando Quintanilla (born September 17, 1977) is a Mexican former racing driver from Nuevo Laredo.

After a youth in motocross and amateur racing in SCCA Formula Continental and Formula Ford 2000, Quintanilla made his Indy Lights debut in 1999 for Conquest Racing. He competed full-time in 2000 for the same team and finished 16th in points. In 2001 Quintanilla became the youngest team owner in the history of the Dayton Indy Lights championship support series in 2001 at the age of 20, when he founded and fielded his own racing team Roquin Motorsports (also associated with Escudería Telmex). He switched teams to his own Roquin Motorsports/Escudería Telmex in 2001 and moved up to tenth in points in the series' final year of operation. He took Roquin Motorsports to the Infiniti Pro Series (now called Indy NXT) in 2002 and finished eleventh. He made two IPS starts in 2003 and returned full-time in 2004 and finished a career best seventh in points. In the combined Indy Lights series and Indy Car he had 42 starts with a best finish of third in 2004 at Kansas Speedway and a best Indy finish of fourth in 2004. During his career, Quintanilla also tested for numerous teams in the CART and Indycar series logging miles for chassis and tire development. Teammates & Early Career: Quintanilla, who was already and established driver teamed up with and helped mentor a young Sergio Pérez during his early racing days in the United States as Quintanilla carried the banner for Telmex's push to elevate Mexican talent internationally. The "Quintanilla's Car" Meme: Within Spanish-speaking racing fandom, the pairing is famously remembered through a nostalgic throwback video shared by Pérez titled "Lavándole el coche a Quintanilla" ("Washing Quintanilla's Car"). The clip shows a very young, humorous "Checo" Pérez alongside his brother Toño, helping clean Quintanilla's racing car while discussing his early dreams of climbing the motorsport ladder.

Quintanilla retired from full time professional race car driving in 2004 to pursue a career in the international logistics market servicing on the board of his families trucking firm Transportes Quintanilla and in 2007 founded Inter-Global Solutions Group which he currently serves as CEO.

Quintanilla resided in Laredo Texas and attended Pepperdine University.

== Racing record ==
=== American open–wheel racing results ===
(key) (Races in bold indicate pole position)

==== CART Indy Lights / Infiniti Pro Series ====
Year	Team	1	2	3	4	5	6	7	8	9	10	11	12	Rank	Points	Ref
1999	Conquest Racing	HMS	LBH	NAZ	MIL	POR	CLE	TOR	MIS	DET	CHI	LAG	FON; 18	24th	0	
2000	Conquest Racing	LBH; 14	MIL; Wth	DET; 16	POR; 16	MIS; 8	CHI; 17	MOH; 12	VAN; 13	LAG; 17	GAT; 10	HOU; 8	FON; 11	16th	16	
2001	Roquin Motorsports	MTY; 10	LBH; 11	TXS; 5	MIL; 8	POR; 5	KAN; 8	TOR; 8	MOH; 9	GAT; 8	ATL; 9	LAG; 8	FON; 9	10th	62	
2002	Roquin Motorsports	KAN	NSH; 11	MIS; 6	KTY; 7	GAT; 6	CHI; 10	TXS; 14						11th	137	
2003	Bowes Seal Fast Racing	HMS	PHX	INDY; 10	PPR	KAN	NSH	MIS	GAT	KTY	CHI	FON		19th	48	
2003	Roquin Motorsports												TXS; 6	19th	48	
2004	Roquin Motorsports	HMS; 6	PHX; 6	INDY; 14	KAN; 4	NSH; 9	MIL	MIS; 11	KTY; 7	PPR; 11	CHI; 10	FON; 5	TXS; 8	7th	264	
