= Kentucky Indy 300 =

Car race in the United States

IndyCar Series
- Venue: Kentucky Speedway
- First race: 2000
- Last race: 2011
- Distance: 300 miles (483 km)
- Laps: 200
- Previous names: Belterra Casino Indy 300 (2000–2004); AMBER Alert Portal Indy 300 (2005); Meijer Indy 300 presented by Coca-Cola and Secret (2006); Meijer Indy 300 presented by Coca-Cola and Edy's (2007–2009); Kentucky Indy 300 (2010–2011)
- Most wins (driver): Buddy Lazier (2); Sam Hornish Jr. (2)
- Most wins (team): Penske Racing (3)

The Kentucky Indy 300 was an IndyCar Series race held at Kentucky Speedway in Sparta, Kentucky.

The IRL IndyCar Series debuted the race in 2000. In the 2002 race, Sarah Fisher won the pole position, the first such by a female driver in major open wheel competition.

During the 2002 Infiniti Pro Series practice, Jason Priestley suffered serious injuries after a practice crash.

Following the 2011 race, IndyCar failed to reach an agreement with the track in order to bring a race to the Speedway for the 2012 season.

== Past winners ==
Season	Date	Driver	Team	Chassis	Engine	Race Distance		Race Time	Average Speed (mph)	Report	Refs
Season	Date	Driver	Team	Chassis	Engine	Laps	Miles (km)	Race Time	Average Speed (mph)	Report	Refs
2000	Aug 27	(United States) Buddy Lazier	Hemelgarn Racing	Dallara	Oldsmobile	200	300 (482.803)	1:49:21	164.601	Report	
2001	Aug 12	(United States) Buddy Lazier	Hemelgarn Racing	Dallara	Oldsmobile	200	300 (482.803)	1:42:55	174.91	Report	
2002	Aug 11	(Brazil) Felipe Giaffone	Mo Nunn Racing	G-Force	Chevrolet	200	300 (482.803)	1:59:11	149.024	Report	
2003	Aug 17	(United States) Sam Hornish Jr.	Panther Racing	Dallara	Chevrolet	200	300 (482.803)	1:29:45	197.897	Report	
2004	Aug 15	(Mexico) Adrián Fernández	Fernández Racing	Panoz G-Force	Honda	200	300 (482.803)	1:38:21	180.588	Report	
2005	Aug 14	(United States) Scott Sharp	Fernández Racing	Panoz	Honda	200	300 (482.803)	1:40:55	175.981	Report	
2006	Aug 13	(United States) Sam Hornish Jr.	Penske Racing	Dallara	Honda	200	300 (482.803)	1:44:03	170.676	Report	
2007	Aug 11	(Brazil) Tony Kanaan	Andretti Green Racing	Dallara	Honda	200	300 (482.803)	1:38:22	180.558	Report	
2008	Aug 9	(New Zealand) Scott Dixon	Chip Ganassi Racing	Dallara	Honda	200	300 (482.803)	1:36:42	183.65	Report	
2009	Aug 1	(Australia) Ryan Briscoe	Penske Racing	Dallara	Honda	200	300 (482.803)	1:28:24	200.893	Report	
2010	Sept 4	(Brazil) Hélio Castroneves	Penske Racing	Dallara	Honda	200	300 (482.803)	1:41:50	174.402	Report	
2011	Oct 2	(United States) Ed Carpenter	Sarah Fisher Racing	Dallara	Honda	200	300 (482.803)	1:42:03	174.039	Report	

=== Firestone Indy Lights ===
Season	Date	Winning driver	Ref
2002	August 11	(United States) A. J. Foyt IV	
2003	August 16	(United States) Jeff Simmons	
2004	August 14	(United States) P. J. Chesson	
2005	August 13	(United States) Travis Gregg	
2006	August 13	(United Kingdom) Jay Howard	
2007	August 11	(Japan) Hideki Mutoh	
2008	August 9	(United Kingdom) Dillon Battistini	
2009	August 1	(New Zealand) Wade Cunningham	
2010	September 4	(United Kingdom) Pippa Mann	
2011	October 2	(United Kingdom) Stefan Wilson	
