= Indy Regency Racing =

Indy Regency Racing was a racing team owned by Sal Incandela who had worked with several Formula One and CART teams.

== Team history ==
The team made its debut at the Mid-Ohio round of the 1991 Indy Lights Championship, with David Kudrave as its driver, and contested the entire Indy Lights series for 1992 (again with Kudrave). In 1993 the team made its move to the CART Championship Car series by fielding a car in the 1993 Indianapolis 500 for F1 veteran Olivier Grouillard. The team's first race that year was to be the Indianapolis 500, however, the car failed to make the field for the "500" but Grouillard participated in 11 races that season for the team. In 1994 the team signed 1990 Indy 500 champion Arie Luyendyk who had been let go by Chip Ganassi Racing. Luyendyk got the team into its first Indy 500 with 8th on the grid but was knocked out by an engine failure 11 laps from the finish. Luyendyk also finished 17th in points in 1994 with a runner up finish at the Michigan International Speedway. In 1995 the team only ran Indy Lights except for an unsuccessful attempt to qualify for the 1995 Indianapolis 500 with driver Franck Freon.

The team returned to the Indy 500 in 2000 with an entry for Johnny Unser who started 30th and finished 22nd in the team's first Indy Racing League race. They returned the following year with inexperienced rookie Cory Witherill who made an improbably successful Bump Day run to get the Regency machine into its 3rd Indy 500. Witherill brought the car home in 19th position. In 2002 Regency fielded a car for Hideki Noda in the last 3 races of the season with little success. The team participated in Toyota Atlantic in 2002 after Indy Lights' demise and apparently shut down shortly thereafter.

== Drivers ==
=== CART ===
- (France) Franck Fréon (1994)
- (France) Olivier Grouillard (1993)
- (Netherlands) Arie Luyendyk (1994)

=== IRL ===
- (Japan) Hideki Noda (2002)
- (United States) Johnny Unser (2000)
- (United States) Cory Witherill (2001)

== Racing results ==
=== Complete CART Indy Car World Series results ===
(key)

Year	Chassis	Engine	Drivers	No.	1	2	3	4	5	6	7	8	9	10	11	12	13	14	15	16
1993					SFR	PHX	LBH	INDY	MIL	DET	POR	CLE	TOR	MCH	NHA	ROA	VAN	MDO	NAZ	LAG
1993	Lola T92/00	Chevrolet 265A V8t	(France) Olivier Grouillard	29				DNQ	12	24	13	11	DNS	17	12	16	26	16	18	20
1994					SFR	PHX	LBH	INDY	MIL	DET	POR	CLE	TOR	MCH	MDO	NHA	VAN	ROA	NAZ	LAG
1994	Lola T94/00	Ilmor 265D V8t	(Netherlands) Arie Luyendyk	28	25	22	11	18	21	19	14	21	31	2	13	27	6	22	26	6
1994	Lola T94/00	Ilmor 265D V8t	(France) Franck Fréon	29																18

=== Complete Indy Racing League results ===
(key)

Year	Chassis	Engine	Drivers	No.	1	2	3	4	5	6	7	8	9	10	11	12	13	14	15
2000					WDW	PHX	LSV	INDY	TXS	PPIR	ATL	KTY	TXS						
2000	G-Force GF05	Oldsmobile Aurora V8	(United States) Johnny Unser	22				22											
2001					PHX	HMS	ATL	INDY	TXS	PPIR	RIR	KAN	NSH	KTY	GAT	CHI	TXS		
2001	G-Force GF05B	Oldsmobile Aurora V8	(United States) Cory Witherill	16			22	19											
2002					HMS	PHX	FON	NAZ	INDY	TXS	PPIR	RIR	KAN	NSH	MCH	KTY	GAT	CHI	TXS
2002	G-Force GF05C	Chevrolet Indy V8	(Japan) Hideki Noda	28													17	24	25
