= 1999 Indy Lights season =

- PPG/Dayton Indy Lights Championship

Season
- Races: 12
- Start date: March 21
- End date: October 30

Awards
- Drivers' champion: (Spain) Oriol Servià

The 1999 CART PPG/Dayton Indy Lights Championship consisted of 12 races. Oriol Servià was the series champion despite not winning a race.

All teams used the Lola T97/20-Buick spec car.

The scoring system was 20-16-14-12-10-8-6-5-4-3-2-1 points awarded to the first 12 (twelve) finishers, with 1 (one) extra point given to the driver who took pole-position, and another extra point given to the driver who led most laps in the race.

== Team and driver chart ==
The following drivers and teams competed in the series:

Team	No.	Drivers	Round(s)
Brian Stewart Racing	4	(Canada) Kenny Wilden	7
Brian Stewart Racing	5	(United States) David Pook	All
Brian Stewart Racing	10	(Mexico) Rodolfo Lavín	All
Conquest Racing	11	(United States) Chris Menninga	All
Conquest Racing	21	(Brazil) Felipe Giaffone	All
Conquest Racing	40	(Mexico) Rolando Quintanilla	12
Dorricott Racing	30	(United States) Casey Mears	All
Dorricott Racing	31	(Austria) Philipp Peter	All
Dorricott Racing	32	(Spain) Oriol Servià	All
Forsythe Championship Racing	1	(Brazil) Airton Daré	All
Forsythe Championship Racing	6	(United Kingdom) Guy Smith	All
Genoa Racing	61	(United States) Cory Witherill	All
Genoa Racing	62	(Brazil) Oswaldo Negri Jr.	2
Johansson Motorsports	2	(United Kingdom) Ben Collins	All
Johansson Motorsports	3	(New Zealand) Scott Dixon	All
Lucas Place Motorsports	7	(United States) Geoff Boss	All
Lucas Place Motorsports	8	(United States) Andy Boss	All
PacWest Lights	17	(United States) Tony Renna	4–8, 12
PacWest Lights	17	(France) Boris Derichebourg	9–11
PacWest Lights	18	(France) Didier André	All
Team KOOL Green	27	(United Kingdom) Jonny Kane	All
Team México Quaker Herdez	87	(Mexico) Mario Domínguez	All
Team México Quaker Herdez	88	(Republic of Ireland) Derek Higgins	All
Team México Quaker Herdez	89	(Mexico) Luis Díaz	11

== Schedule ==
Rd.	Date	Track	Location
1	March 21	O Homestead-Miami Speedway	Homestead, Florida
2	April 18	R Long Beach Street Circuit	Long Beach, California
3	May 2	O Nazareth Speedway	Nazareth, Pennsylvania
4	June 6	O Milwaukee Mile	West Allis, Wisconsin
5	June 20	R Portland International Raceway	Portland, Oregon
6	June 27	R Cleveland Burke Lakefront Airport	Cleveland, Ohio
7	July 18	R Exhibition Place	Toronto, Ontario
8	July 24	O Michigan International Speedway	Brooklyn, Michigan
9	August 8	R The Raceway at Belle Isle Park	Detroit, Michigan
10	August 22	O Chicago Motor Speedway	Cicero, Illinois
11	September 12	R Laguna Seca Raceway	Monterey, California
12	October 30	O California Speedway	Fontana, California

== Race results ==
Round	Circuit	Pole position	Fastest lap	Most laps led	Race Winner	
Round	Circuit	Pole position	Fastest lap	Most laps led	Driver	Team
1	(United States) Homestead-Miami Speedway	(Mexico) Mario Domínguez	(Mexico) Mario Domínguez	(Mexico) Mario Domínguez	(Mexico) Mario Domínguez	Team México Quaker Herdez
2	(United States) Long Beach Street Circuit	(Brazil) Felipe Giaffone	(Brazil) Felipe Giaffone	(Brazil) Felipe Giaffone	(Austria) Philipp Peter	Dorricott Racing
3	(United States) Nazareth Speedway	(Spain) Oriol Servià	(United States) Casey Mears	(Brazil) Airton Daré	(Brazil) Airton Daré	Forsythe Championship Racing
4	(United States) Milwaukee Mile	(Brazil) Felipe Giaffone	(United States) Tony Renna	(Republic of Ireland) Derek Higgins	(Republic of Ireland) Derek Higgins	Team México Quaker Herdez
5	(United States) Portland International Raceway	(Spain) Oriol Servià	(United Kingdom) Jonny Kane	(Austria) Philipp Peter	(Austria) Philipp Peter	Dorricott Racing
6	(United States) Cleveland Burke Lakefront Airport	(France) Didier André	(Republic of Ireland) Derek Higgins	(Republic of Ireland) Derek Higgins	(Republic of Ireland) Derek Higgins	Team México Quaker Herdez
7	(Canada) Exhibition Place	(United States) Geoff Boss	(United States) Geoff Boss	(United States) Geoff Boss	(United States) Geoff Boss	Lucas Place Motorsports
8	(United States) Michigan International Speedway	(United Kingdom) Jonny Kane	(Mexico) Rodolfo Lavín	(Austria) Philipp Peter	(Austria) Philipp Peter	Dorricott Racing
9	(United States) The Raceway at Belle Isle Park	(Spain) Oriol Servià	(Brazil) Felipe Giaffone	(Republic of Ireland) Derek Higgins	(Republic of Ireland) Derek Higgins	Team México Quaker Herdez
10	(United States) Chicago Motor Speedway	(New Zealand) Scott Dixon	(United Kingdom) Guy Smith	(New Zealand) Scott Dixon	(New Zealand) Scott Dixon	Johansson Motorsports
11	(United States) Laguna Seca Raceway	(United Kingdom) Guy Smith	(France) Didier André	(France) Didier André	(France) Didier André	PacWest Lights
12	(United States) California Speedway	(United Kingdom) Jonny Kane	(United States) Casey Mears	(France) Didier André	(United Kingdom) Jonny Kane	Team KOOL Green

== Race summaries ==
=== Homestead race ===
Held March 21 at Homestead-Miami Speedway. Mario Domínguez won the pole.

Top Five Results

1. Mario Domínguez
2. Airton Daré
3. Scott Dixon
4. Andy Boss
5. Casey Mears

=== Long Beach race ===
Held April 18 at Long Beach, California Street Course. Felipe Giaffone won the pole.

Top Five Results

1. Philipp Peter
2. Scott Dixon
3. Geoff Boss
4. Didier André
5. Casey Mears

=== Nazareth race ===
Held May 2 at Nazareth Speedway. Oriol Servià won the pole.

Top Five Results

1. Airton Daré
2. Oriol Servià
3. Casey Mears
4. Scott Dixon
5. Ben Collins

=== Milwaukee race ===
Held June 6 at The Milwaukee Mile. Felipe Giaffone won the pole.

Top Five Results

1. Derek Higgins
2. Casey Mears
3. Tony Renna
4. Felipe Giaffone
5. Oriol Servià

=== Portland race ===
Held June 20 at Portland International Raceway. Oriol Servià won the pole.

Top Five Results

1. Philipp Peter
2. Oriol Servià
3. Guy Smith
4. Casey Mears
5. Airton Daré

=== Cleveland race ===
Held June 27 at Burke Lakefront Airport. Didier André won the pole.

Top Five Results

1. Derek Higgins
2. Oriol Servià
3. Felipe Giaffone
4. Philipp Peter
5. Airton Daré

=== Toronto race ===
Held July 18 at Exhibition Place. Geoff Boss won the pole.

Top Five Results

1. Geoff Boss
2. Oriol Servià
3. Didier André
4. Felipe Giaffone
5. Jonny Kane

=== Michigan race ===
Held July 24 at Michigan International Speedway. Jonny Kane won the pole.

Top Five Results

1. Philipp Peter
2. Casey Mears
3. Felipe Giaffone
4. Mario Domínguez
5. Oriol Servià

=== Detroit race ===
Held August 8 at Belle Isle Raceway. Oriol Servià won the pole.

Top Five Results

1. Derek Higgins
2. Oriol Servià
3. Jonny Kane
4. Felipe Giaffone
5. Didier André

=== Chicago race ===
Held August 22 at The Chicago Motor Speedway. Scott Dixon won the pole.

Top Five Results

1. Scott Dixon
2. Guy Smith
3. Casey Mears
4. Oriol Servià
5. Mario Domínguez

=== Laguna Seca race ===
Held September 12 at Mazda Raceway Laguna Seca. Guy Smith won the pole.

Top Five Results

1. Didier André
2. Scott Dixon
3. Jonny Kane
4. Guy Smith
5. Casey Mears

=== Fontana race ===
Held October 30 at The California Speedway. Jonny Kane won the pole.

Top Five Results

1. Jonny Kane
2. Ben Collins
3. Didier André
4. Cory Witherill
5. Mario Domínguez

== Championship standings ==
=== Drivers' championship ===
Scoring system

Position	**1st**	**2nd**	**3rd**	**4th**	**5th**	**6th**	**7th**	**8th**	**9th**	**10th**	**11th**	**12th**
Points	20	16	14	12	10	8	6	5	4	3	2	1

- The driver who qualifies on pole is awarded one additional point.
- An additional point is awarded to the driver who leads the most laps in a race.

Pos	Driver	HMS (United States)	LBH (United States)	NAZ (United States)	MIL (United States)	POR (United States)	CLE (United States)	TOR (Canada)	MIC (United States)	DET (United States)	CHI (United States)	LAG (United States)	FON (United States)	Points
1	(Spain) Oriol Servià	6	12	**2**	5	**2**	2	2	5	**2**	4	7	14	130
2	(United States) Casey Mears	5	5	3	2	4	8	8	2	9	3	5	13	116
3	(Austria) Philipp Peter	13	1	8	11	1*	4	7	1*	8	12	8	10	101
4	(United Kingdom) Jonny Kane	7	16	12	9	6	18	5	**7**	3	9	3	**1**	89
5	(New Zealand) Scott Dixon	3	2	4	15	11	14	18	16	7	**1***	2	16	88
6	(Brazil) Felipe Giaffone	17	**10***	18	**4**	10	3	4	3	4	8	18	20	78
7	(Republic of Ireland) Derek Higgins	DNS	19	11	1*	16	1*	12	11	1*	6	19	15	76
8	(France) Didier André	14	4	16	13	17	**17**	3	12	5	13	1*	3*	74
9	(United Kingdom) Guy Smith	11	18	10	8	3	11	6	6	13	2	**4**	19	71
10	(Brazil) Airton Daré	2	17	1*	7	5	5	19	15	15	18	12	8	69
11	(Mexico) Mario Domínguez	**1***	6	17	16	15	9	20	4	17	5	16	5	66
12	(United States) Geoff Boss	8	3	13	14	12	13	**1**	9	6	11	14	11	58
13	(United Kingdom) Ben Collins	10	11	5	18	8	6	16	18	18	7	15	2	50
14	(United States) Chris Menninga	9	8	6	12	7	10	10	13	19	10	6	7	47
15	(United States) Andy Boss	4	13	15	10	9	7	13	10	10	17	17	12	32
16	(United States) Tony Renna				3	14	19	14	Wth				6	22
17	(Mexico) Rodolfo Lavín	16	9	9	19	18	15	17	8	11	14	13	9	19
18	(United States) Cory Witherill	15	14	14	17	19	16	11	17	12	15	11	4	17
19	(United States) David Pook	12	15	7	6	13	12	15	14	14	16	20	17	16
20	(Brazil) Oswaldo Negri Jr.		7											6
21	(France) Boris Derichebourg									16	DNS	9		4
22	(Canada) Kenny Wilden							9						4
23	(Mexico) Luis Díaz											10		3
24	(Mexico) Rolando Quintanilla												18	0
Pos	Driver	HMS (United States)	LBH (United States)	NAZ (United States)	MIL (United States)	POR (United States)	CLE (United States)	TOR (Canada)	MIC (United States)	DET (United States)	CHI (United States)	LAG (United States)	FON (United States)	Points

Color	Result
Gold	Winner
Silver	2nd place
Bronze	3rd place
Green	4th & 5th place
Light Blue	6th–10th place
Dark Blue	Finished (Outside Top 10)
Purple	Did not finish
Red	Did not qualify (DNQ)
Brown	Withdrawn (Wth)
Black	Disqualified (DSQ)
White	Did not start (DNS)
Blank	Did not participate (DNP)
Blank	Not competing

**In-line notation**
**Bold**	Pole position (1 point)
Italics	Ran fastest race lap
*	Led most race laps (1 point)
^{1}	Qualifying cancelled no bonus point awarded

- Ties in points broken by number of wins, or best finishes.
