= 2003 Infiniti Pro Series =

2003 Infiniti Pro Series season
- IRL Infiniti Pro Series

Season
- Races: 12
- Start date: March 2
- End date: October 11

Awards
- Drivers' champion: (United Kingdom) Mark Taylor
- Teams' champion: Panther Racing

The 2003 IRL Infiniti Pro Series was the second season of the series under the Indy Racing League ownership, and the 18th in Indy NXT combined history, as officially recognized by IndyCar. All teams used Dallara IL-02 chassis and Infiniti engines.

British rookie Mark Taylor won the series with a total of 7 wins in 12 races, driving for a newly formed program by IndyCar team Panther Racing, who then signed him to drive for the team's main programme in 2004. Taylor's last win at Fontana crowned him as the champion with one race to spare over Indy Lights returnee Jeff Simmons, who won two races at Gateway and Kentucky for another new team, Keith Duesenberg Racing.

The season was notable for the first running of the Freedom 100 at the Indianapolis Motor Speedway, this being the first time that a support race was included in the Indianapolis 500 program. Ed Carpenter, driving for reining champions A. J. Foyt Enterprises, won the race over Cory Witherill from pole position, his lone win of the year in route to a 3rd place finish in the standings. Thiago Medeiros won the final race at Texas and finished a mere six points behind Carpenter.

Aaron Fike was also a winner at Pikes Peak, but he missed the Phoenix race early in the season for a DUI offence and didn't score another podium during the year, losing fifth place in the points to Witherill. Fike still finished ahead of 2002 runner-up Arie Luyendyk Jr., who missed out again on race wins with a best finish of third, and would not win a race in the series until 2008. Among former IndyCar competitors Witherill and Brandon Erwin competed full-time in the series, while Billy Roe, Scott Harrington and Ronnie Johncox also took part in the Freedom 100, and Dave Steele in the Nashville race.

As well as Panther and Duesenberg, Kenn Hardley Racing also joined the field. Luyendyk Racing left the series after the 2002 season, while Roquin Motorsports and Bowes Seal Fast Racing only contested a handful of races and REV1 Racing withdrew after the Freedom 100. The series had at least 13 drivers at each round, with 19 competitors at the Freedom 100 and 17 at the season finale in Texas. However, only seven drivers competed in every race, with three more contesting all but one race.

== Team and driver chart ==
Team	No.	Drivers	Rounds
Brian Stewart Racing	3	(Canada) Marty Roth	1–2, 10–12
Brian Stewart Racing	3	(Canada) Jonathan Urlin	3–7
Brian Stewart Racing	33	(Canada) Jonathan Urlin	1–2
Brian Stewart Racing	33	(United States) Craig Dollansky	3
Brian Stewart Racing	33	(United States) Dave Steele	6
Brian Stewart Racing	33	(Canada) Marty Roth	7
Brian Stewart Racing	33	(United States) Paul Dana	8–11
Brian Stewart Racing	33	(United States) Tony Turco	12
Panther Racing	4	(United Kingdom) Mark Taylor	All
Panther Racing	41	(United States) Dane Carter	12
Sinden Racing Service	5	(Netherlands) Arie Luyendyk Jr.	All
Sam Schmidt Motorsports	6	(United States) Lloyd Mack	1
Sam Schmidt Motorsports	6	(Italy) Marco Cioci	3
Sam Schmidt Motorsports	6	(United States) Ross Fonferko	6–7
Sam Schmidt Motorsports	9	(Canada) Tom Wood	1–9
Sam Schmidt Motorsports	9	(United States) Taylor Fletcher	10–12
Sam Schmidt Motorsports	99	(United States) Brandon Erwin	1–9
Sam Schmidt Motorsports	99	(Italy) Marco Cioci	10
Sam Schmidt Motorsports	99	(United States) Brad Pollard	11–12
REV 1 Racing	8	(United States) Ronnie Johncox	1–3
Roquin Motorsports	11	(Mexico) Rolando Quintanilla	12
Bowes Seal Fast Racing	11	(Mexico) Rolando Quintanilla	3
Bowes Seal Fast Racing	37	(United States) Billy Roe	3
Beardsley Motorsports	12	(United States) Matt Beardsley	1–7, 11–12
A. J. Foyt Enterprises	14	(United States) Ed Carpenter	All
Keith Duesenberg Racing	20	(United States) Jeff Simmons	All
Kenn Hardley Racing	24	(United States) Paul Dana	1–7
Kenn Hardley Racing	24	(United States) Moses Smith	8
Kenn Hardley Racing	24	(United States) Billy Roe	9–12
AFS Racing	25	(United States) Scott Harrington	3
AFS Racing	25	(United States) G. J. Mennen	5, 7–12
AFS Racing	27	(United States) Gary Peterson	1–5, 7–12
Genoa Racing	36	(Brazil) Thiago Medeiros	All
Hemelgarn 91/Johnson Motorsports	91	(United States) Aaron Fike	1, 3–12
Hemelgarn 91/Johnson Motorsports	91	(United States) Tony Ave	2
Hemelgarn 91/Johnson Motorsports	92	(United States) Cory Witherill	All

== Schedule ==
All seven rounds contested in the 2002 season were retained in the schedule, which now supported the IRL IndyCar Series from the beginning of the season and was expanded to 12 races, all held on ovals. For the first time, a racing series would hold a race at the Indianapolis Motor Speedway as a support event for the Indianapolis 500 with the first running of the Freedom 100, followed by the series' first visit to Pikes Peak. New rounds were also added at former Indy Lights venues like Homestead (last featured in 1999), Phoenix (absent since 1995) and Fontana, which hosted the last race of the original Indy Lights series in 2001.

Rd.	Date	Race name	Track	Location
1	March 2	Western Union 100	Homestead–Miami Speedway	Homestead, Florida
2	March 22	Phoenix 100	Phoenix International Raceway	Avondale, Arizona
3	May 18	Freedom 100	Indianapolis Motor Speedway	Speedway, Indiana
4	June 14	Pikes Peak 100	Pikes Peak International Raceway	Fountain, Colorado
5	July 6	Aventis Racing for Kids 100	Kansas Speedway	Kansas City, Kansas
6	July 18	Cleanevent 100	Nashville Superspeedway	Lebanon, Tennessee
7	July 27	Michigan 100	Michigan International Speedway	Brooklyn, Michigan
8	August 9	St. Louis 100	Gateway International Raceway	Madison, Illinois
9	August 16	Kentucky 100	Kentucky Speedway	Sparta, Kentucky
10	September 6	Chicago 100	Chicagoland Speedway	Joliet, Illinois
11	September 20	California 100	California Speedway	Fontana, California
12	October 11	dreamerscandles.com 100	Texas Motor Speedway	Fort Worth, Texas

== Race results ==
Round	Race	Pole position	Fastest lap	Most laps led	Race Winner	
Round	Race	Pole position	Fastest lap	Most laps led	Driver	Team
1	Homestead–Miami Speedway	(Brazil) Thiago Medeiros	(United Kingdom) Mark Taylor	(United Kingdom) Mark Taylor	(United Kingdom) Mark Taylor	Panther Racing
2	Phoenix International Raceway	(United Kingdom) Mark Taylor	(United Kingdom) Mark Taylor	(United Kingdom) Mark Taylor	(United Kingdom) Mark Taylor	Panther Racing
3	Indianapolis Motor Speedway	(United States) Ed Carpenter	(United States) Ed Carpenter	(United States) Ed Carpenter	(United States) Ed Carpenter	A. J. Foyt Enterprises
4	Pikes Peak International Raceway	(United States) Jeff Simmons	(United States) Cory Witherill	(United States) Aaron Fike	(United States) Aaron Fike	Hemelgarn 91/Johnson Motorsports
5	Kansas Speedway	(United States) Ed Carpenter	(United States) Aaron Fike	(United States) Ed Carpenter	(United Kingdom) Mark Taylor	Panther Racing
6	Nashville Superspeedway	(United Kingdom) Mark Taylor	(United States) Brandon Erwin	(United Kingdom) Mark Taylor	(United Kingdom) Mark Taylor	Panther Racing
7	Michigan International Speedway	(Netherlands) Arie Luyendyk Jr.	(United States) Matt Beardsley	(United Kingdom) Mark Taylor	(United Kingdom) Mark Taylor	Panther Racing
8	Gateway International Raceway	(United States) Brandon Erwin	(United Kingdom) Mark Taylor	(United Kingdom) Mark Taylor	(United States) Jeff Simmons	Keith Duesenberg Racing
9	Kentucky Speedway	(United States) Jeff Simmons	(United States) Ed Carpenter	(United States) Jeff Simmons	(United States) Jeff Simmons	Keith Duesenberg Racing
10	Chicagoland Speedway	(United States) Ed Carpenter	(United States) G. J. Mennen	(United States) Ed Carpenter	(United Kingdom) Mark Taylor	Panther Racing
11	California Speedway	(United Kingdom) Mark Taylor	(United States) Ed Carpenter	(United Kingdom) Mark Taylor	(United Kingdom) Mark Taylor	Panther Racing
12	Texas Motor Speedway	(Netherlands) Arie Luyendyk Jr.	(Canada) Marty Roth	(Netherlands) Arie Luyendyk Jr.	(Brazil) Thiago Medeiros	Genoa Racing

== Championship standings ==
=== Drivers' Championship ===
Scoring system

Position	**1st**	**2nd**	**3rd**	**4th**	**5th**	**6th**	**7th**	**8th**	**9th**	**10th**	**11th**	**12th**	**13th**	**14th**	**15th**	**16th**	**17th**	**18th**	**19th**
Points	50	40	35	32	30	28	26	24	22	20	19	18	17	16	15	14	13	12	11

- The driver who leads the most laps in a race is awarded two additional points.

Pos	Driver	HOM	PHX	INDY	PIK	KAN	NSH	MIS	GAT	KEN	CHI	FON	TXS	Points
1	(United Kingdom) Mark Taylor RY	1*	**1***	3	5	1	**1***	1*	9*	13	1	**1***	14	482
2	(United States) Jeff Simmons	14	5	4	**2**	14	4	2	1	**1***	3	8	2	407
3	(United States) Ed Carpenter	15	13	**1***	4	**2***	13	7	4	5	**2***	2	4	377
4	(Brazil) Thiago Medeiros R	**2**	2	19	6	7	5	3	11	3	9	3	1	371
5	(United States) Cory Witherill	12	9	2	12	5	6	15	2	2	6	9	3	336
6	(United States) Aaron Fike	8		6	1*	4	14	4	6	6	5	6	5	328
7	(Netherlands) Arie Luyendyk Jr.	4	10	15	3	12	9	**11**	3	4	4	10	**13***	299
8	(Canada) Tom Wood	6	15	13	10	3	2	5	5	10				235
9	(United States) Paul Dana R	13	6	7	13	13	7	10	7	8	13	14		234
10	(United States) Gary Peterson	11	14	16	8	11		9	12	7	8	15	10	217
11	(United States) Brandon Erwin R	3	4	11	11	6	10	12	**10**	9				213
12	(United States) Matt Beardsley	7	8	18	9	9	8	16				7	16	184
13	(United States) G. J. Mennen					8		8	8	11	7	4	7	175
14	(Canada) Jonathan Urlin R	5	7	5	7	10	12	14						166
15	(Canada) Marty Roth	9	11					6			10	13	12	124
16	(United States) Billy Roe			14						12	11	5	8	107
17	(United States) Ronnie Johncox	10	12	8										62
18	(United States) Ross Fonferko R						3	13						52
19	(Mexico) Rolando Quintanilla			10									6	48
20	(United States) Taylor Fletcher R										14	12	17	47
21	(Italy) Marco Cioci R			9							12			40
22	(United States) Tony Ave R		3											35
23	(United States) Brad Pollard R											11	15	34
24	(United States) Dane Carter R												9	22
25	(United States) Dave Steele R						11							19
26	(United States) Tony Turco R												11	19
27	(United States) Scott Harrington			12										18
28	(United States) Moses Smith R								13					17
29	(United States) Lloyd Mack R	16												14
30	(United States) Craig Dollansky R			17										13
Pos	Driver	HOM	PHX	INDY	PIK	KAN	NSH	MIS	GAT	KEN	CHI	FON	TXS	Points

Color	Result
Gold	Winner
Silver	2nd place
Bronze	3rd place
Green	4th & 5th place
Light Blue	6th–10th place
Dark Blue	Finished (Outside Top 10)
Purple	Did not finish
Red	Did not qualify (DNQ)
Brown	Withdrawn (Wth)
Black	Disqualified (DSQ)
White	Did not start (DNS)
Blank	Did not participate (DNP)
Blank	Not competing

**In-line notation**
**Bold**	Pole position
Italics	Ran fastest race lap
*	Led most race laps (2 point)
^{1}	Qualifying cancelled no bonus point awarded

- Ties in points broken by number of wins, or best finishes.
