= Dallara IR-28 =

Open-wheel formula car built by Dallara

- Category: IndyCar Series
- Constructor: Dallara

Technical specifications

Competition history

The Dallara IR-28 is an open-wheel formula racing car developed and produced by Italian manufacturer Dallara expected to debut for the 2028 IndyCar Series.

== Overview ==
The Dallara IR-28 was officially revealed on June 28, 2026. The IR-28 will be equipped with a 2.4-liter twin-turbo V6 engine. The IR-28 is expected to be 100 pounds (45 kg) lighter than the Dallara DW12, with a new six-speed transmission produced by Xtrac reducing the weight of the car by 25 pounds (11 kg). For the IR-28, IndyCar announced that shock absorbers will become a supplied part. With the priority of safety, IndyCar also designed the IR-28 to be faster than the DW12 and break track records.

== Testing and reception ==
IndyCar Series champion Álex Palou and 2026 Indianapolis 500 winner Felix Rosenqvist both praised the IR-28 when IndyCar released initial renderings.

After testing the car on the Indianapolis Motor Speedway road course in August 2026, Palou believed the IR-28 could break track records. Alexander Rossi praised the new car after install laps, saying the car was "really rewarding to drive" and compared the smoothness of the IR-28 to that of a Formula One car. Palou and Rossi tested the oval kit at the Indianapolis Motor Speedway in September. Palou and Rossi returned to test the IR-28 in October at Sebring International Raceway, performing its first long-run tests.

== See also ==
- Dallara DW12
