= Dallara DW12 =

Open-wheel formula racing car built by Dallara

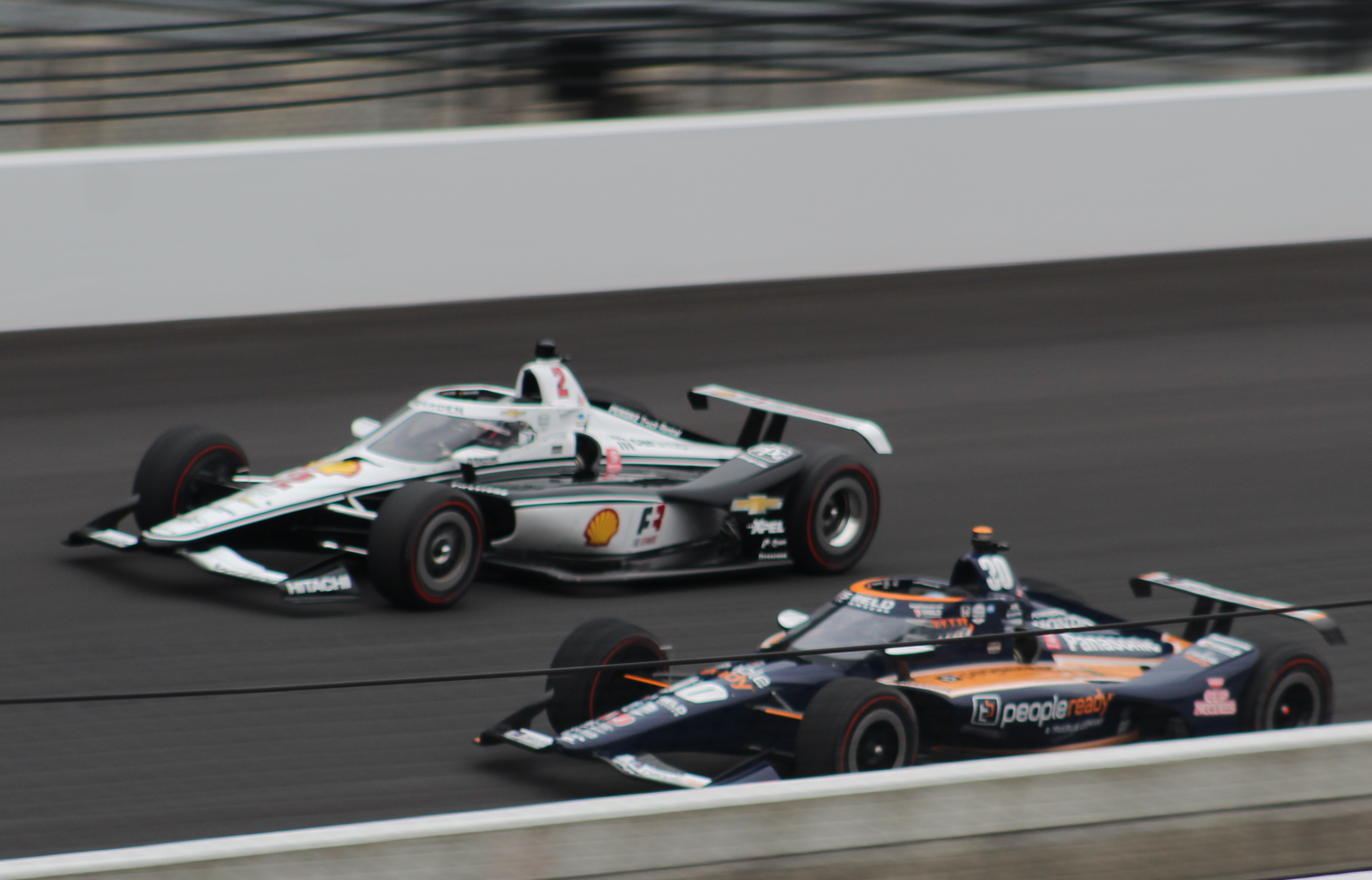
- Josef Newgarden and Takuma Sato driving DW12s at the 2021 Indianapolis 500
- Category: IndyCar Series
- Constructor: Dallara
- Designers: Tony Cotman; Luca Pignacca; Sam Garrett; Andrea Toso
- Predecessor: Dallara IR-05
- Successor: Dallara IR-28

Technical specifications
- Chassis: Carbon fiber monocoque with honeycomb kevlar structure
- Suspension (front): Double A-arm, pushrod, with third spring and anti-roll bar
- Suspension (rear): As front
- Length: 201.7 in (5,123 mm) on road/street course, short ovals; 197.33 in (5,012 mm) on 1.5-mile intermediate ovals, superspeedways and Indianapolis 500 (Mk. III)
- Width: 75.5 in (1,918 mm) minimum (Road/Street), 75.75 in (1,924 mm) minimum (Ovals), 76.5 in (1,943 mm) maximum (measured outside rim to rim)
- Height: 40 in (1,016 mm) including onboard camera
- Axle track: Max. 76.3 in (1,938 mm)
- Wheelbase: 117.5–121.5 in (2,984–3,086 mm) adjustable
- Engine: Chevrolet Indy V6 (2012-present), Honda HI26E (2012-present) and Lotus Indy V6 (2012) 2.2 L (134 cu in) V6 90° with 4-stroke piston Otto cycle with efficient combustion process and greater emission engine burning single (Honda in 2012-2013)/twin-turbocharged (supplied by BorgWarner), mid-engined, longitudinally-mounted
- Transmission: Xtrac #1011 6-speed AGS (Assisted Gearchange System) sequential semi-automatic paddle-shift + 1 reverse
- Battery: Braille ML7Ti 12 volts
- Power: 550 hp (410 kW) on speedways, 575 hp (429 kW) on 1.5-mile ovals, 650 hp (485 kW) on short ovals and road/street courses + 50 hp (37 kW) on push-to-pass
- Weight: 1,650 lb (748 kg) on 1.5-mile speedways, superspeedways and Indianapolis 500; 1,680 lb (762 kg) on short ovals; 1,690 lb (767 kg) road and street courses (including additional of aeroscreen)
- Fuel: E85 (85% ethanol + 15% gasoline) (2012-2022): Sunoco E85R (2012-2018); Speedway E85 (2019-2022); 100% renewable E85 (85% ethanol + 15% biofuel): Shell V-Power Nitro+ E100 (2023-)
- Lubricants: Pennzoil (all Chevrolet-powered teams), Sunoco (Chip Ganassi Racing), Mobil 1 (Andretti Global and Rahal Letterman Lanigan Racing), Phillips 66 (Meyer Shank Racing) and Valvoline (Dale Coyne Racing)
- Brakes: Brembo (2012-2016) later PFC (2017-present) carbon discs and pads. Brembo (2012-2017) later PFC ZR90 (2018-present) 4-piston (all oval races)/6-piston (road/street course races) calipers
- Tyres: Firestone Firehawk dry slick and treaded wet tires O.Z. Racing and BBS wheels
- Clutch: AP Racing CP8153-DE03-SN 3-plate carbon with steel housing

Competition history
- Notable entrants: All IndyCar Series Teams
- Notable drivers: All IndyCar Series Drivers
- Debut: 2012 Honda Grand Prix of St. Petersburg

The Dallara DW12 (formally named the Dallara IR-12) is an open-wheel formula racing car developed and produced by Italian manufacturer Dallara for use by the teams in the IndyCar Series. The DW12 was first used in the 2012 IndyCar Series season, replacing the nine-year-old Dallara IR-05 chassis. It is to be replaced by the planned Dallara IR-28, whose arrival has been pushed from 2027 to 2028 by engine-production delays, supply chain delays and financial problems.

Under a deal negotiated by the IndyCar organization, each chassis costs $349,000. Since 2015, Honda and Chevrolet have offered alternatives to the Dallara aerodynamic kit. No IndyCar chassis has been used for a longer period of time.

The DW12 added safety features such as a partial enclosure around the rear wheels and a redesigned front section intended to prevent single-seater crashes such as the one that killed Dan Wheldon, the chassis' test driver and namesake. Wheldon was killed at Las Vegas Motor Speedway on October 16, 2011, the final race of the previous IR-05. The nomenclature recalls that of the old Formula One team Ligier, whose cars were labeled JSxx after French F1 driver Jo Schlesser, who died in the 1968 French Grand Prix.

== The ICONIC Project ==
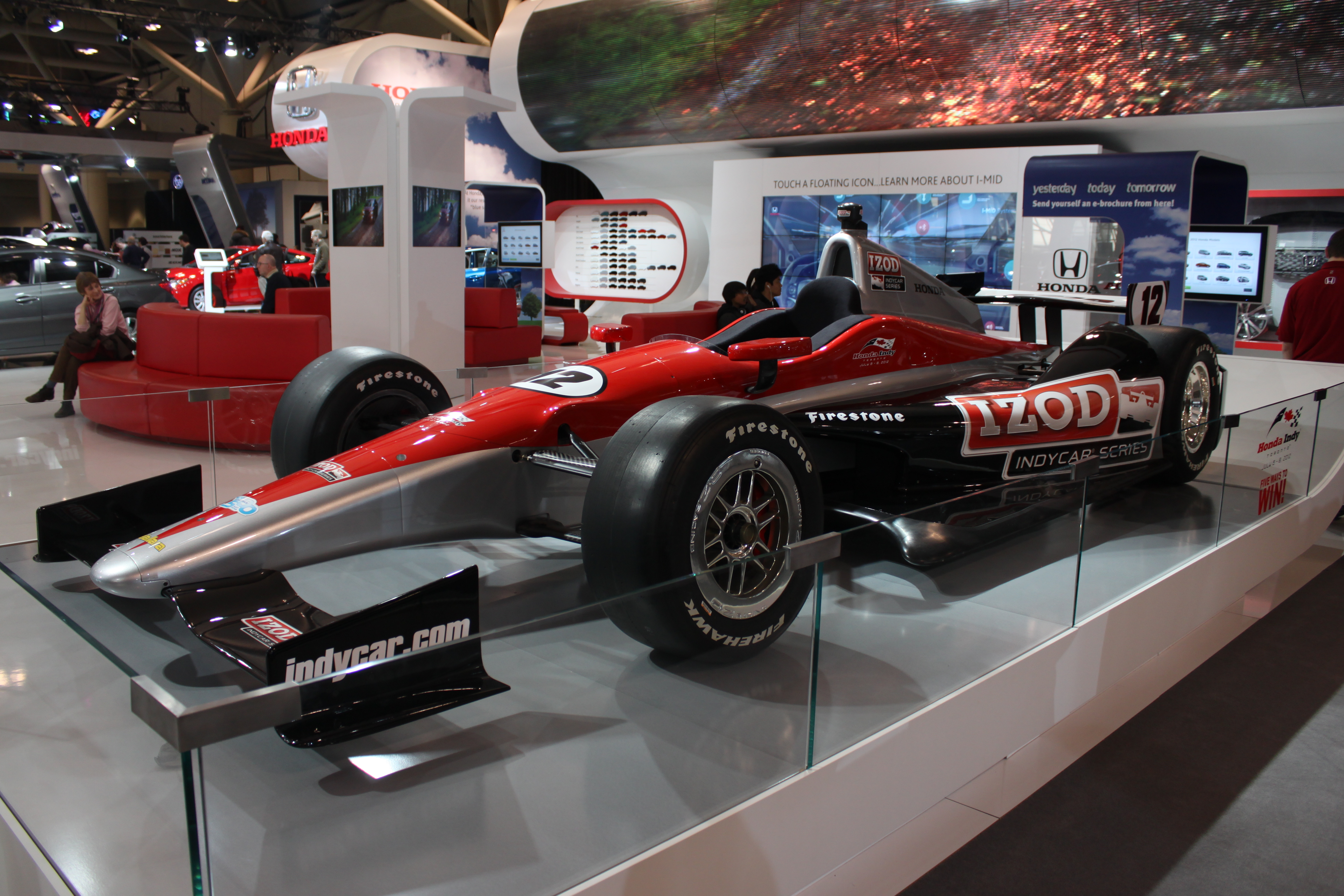
The Dallara DW12 on show in 2012

In 2010, the Indy Racing League began to forge its ICONIC Plan (Innovative, Competitive, Open-wheel, New, Industry-relevant, Cost-effective). The ICONIC committee was composed of experts and executives from racing and technical fields: Randy Bernard (IndyCar CEO), William R. Looney III (military), Brian Barnhart (IndyCar), Gil de Ferran (retired Indy 500 champion), Tony Purnell (motorsport), Eddie Gossage (Texas Motor Speedway), Neil Ressler, Tony Cotman (NZR Track Consulting), and Rick Long (motorsport). That year, IndyCar accepted proposals for a new chassis from BAT Engineering, Dallara, DeltaWing, Lola, and Swift. On July 14, 2010, organizers announced that they had accepted the Dallara proposal.

The ICONIC plan was implemented in the 2012 season. The cars used through 2011—a 2003/2007-model Dallara IR-05s with naturally aspirated V8 engines (required since 1997)—were retired.

=== New chassis ===
Under the ICONIC regulations, all teams compete with a core rolling chassis, called the "IndyCar Safety Cell". Teams outfit the chassis with body work, referred to as "Aero Kits": front and rear wings, sidepods, and engine cowlings. Any manufacturer may market an Aero Kit, but must offer it to all teams under a price ceiling. Purnell invited car manufacturers and other companies such as Lockheed Martin and GE to develop kits.

The IndyCar Safety Cell was capped at a price of $349,000 and are assembled at a new Dallara facility in Speedway, Indiana. Aero Kits are capped at $70,000. Teams may buy a complete Dallara safety cell/aero kit for a discount.

On May 12, 2011, Dallara unveiled the first concept cars: one apiece in oval and road course Aero Kit configuration.

On April 30, 2011, IndyCar owners voted 15–0 to reject the introduction of multiple Aero Kits for the 2012 season, citing costs. Owners expressed their desire to introduce the new chassis/engines for 2012, but have all participants use the Dallara aerodynamic package in 2012, and delay the introduction of multiple aero kits until 2013. On August 14, 2011, IndyCar confirmed that the introduction of multiple Aero Kits would be delayed until 2013 for "economic reasons", and furthermore, it was put off for 2013 as well. Chevrolet and Lotus had already announced their intention to build aero kits.

2011 Indianapolis 500 winner Dan Wheldon carried out the first official test of the Dallara chassis at Mid-Ohio in August 2011. Following Wheldon's death at the season-ending race in Las Vegas, Dallara announced that the 2012 chassis would be named the DW12 in his honor.

== Dallara aero kit (2012–2014) ==
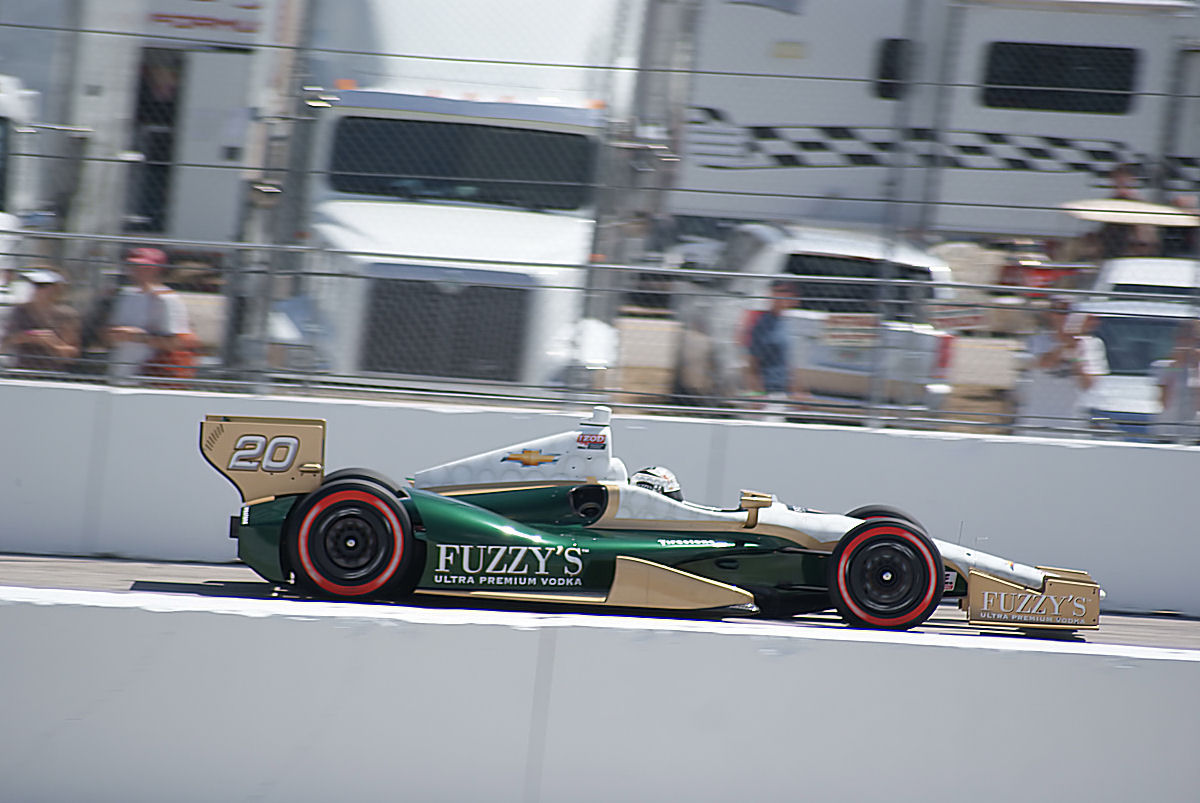
#20 Ed Carpenter Racing at the 2012 Honda Grand Prix of St. Petersburg, with the original Road Course DW12 aero kit

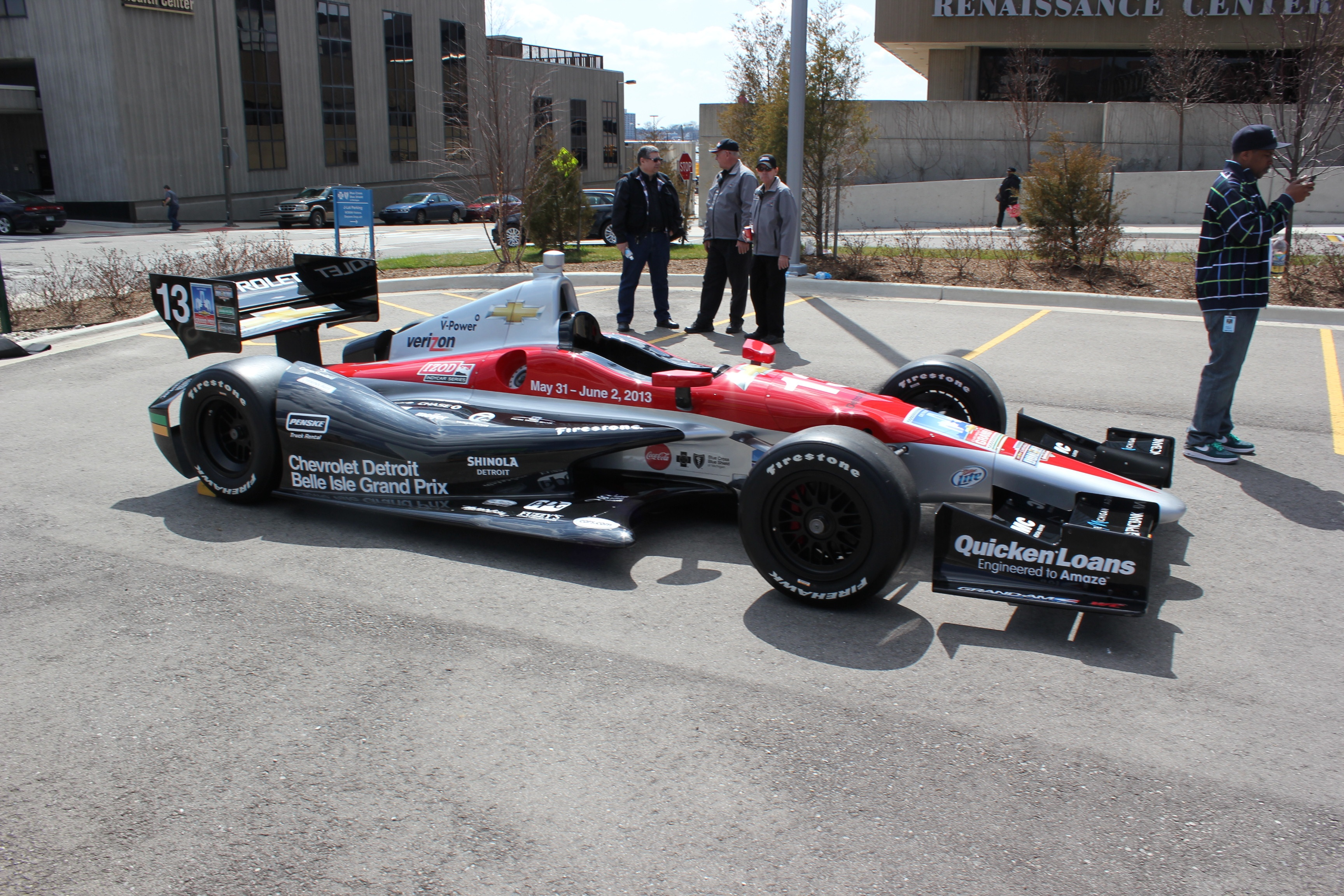
The Dallara DW12 on show in 2013

The first official test of the Dallara IR-12 chassis was carried out by Dan Wheldon at Mid-Ohio on August 8, 2011. Phase I of testing involved Wheldon, and was planned to involve three road courses and three ovals, over a total of about twelve days. The second test was held August 18 at Barber, and the third was held on the USGP road course at Indianapolis on September 1. Oval tests took place in September at Iowa and Indianapolis.

Honda (Scott Dixon) and Chevrolet (Will Power) began Phase II of on-track testing at Mid-Ohio in early October. A scheduled test at Las Vegas was cancelled after Wheldon lost his life in the 2011 race held at the track, resulting in Dallara renaming the chassis, a practice adopted from Ligier, which named its race cars "JS" for Jo Schlesser. Testing resumed in late October and continued through February at several venues including Sebring, Fontana, Homestead, Phoenix, and Sonoma. Lotus first took to the track on January 12 at Palm Beach, and testing by individual teams began on January 16.

A full-field official open test took place on March 5–6 and 8–9, 2012 at Sebring International Raceway.

The Dallara DW12's race debut was at the 2012 Honda Grand Prix of St. Petersburg on March 25, 2012. Team Penske's Will Power won the inaugural pole and Hélio Castroneves won the first race with the DW12.

Full-field oval open tests also took place on April 4, 2012, at Indianapolis Motor Speedway and May 7, 2012, at Texas Motor Speedway.

The car's Indianapolis debut came in the 2012 Indianapolis 500. In its first three 500s the car saw 136 lead changes, including a track-record 68 in 2013.

== Manufacturer aero kits (2015–2017) ==
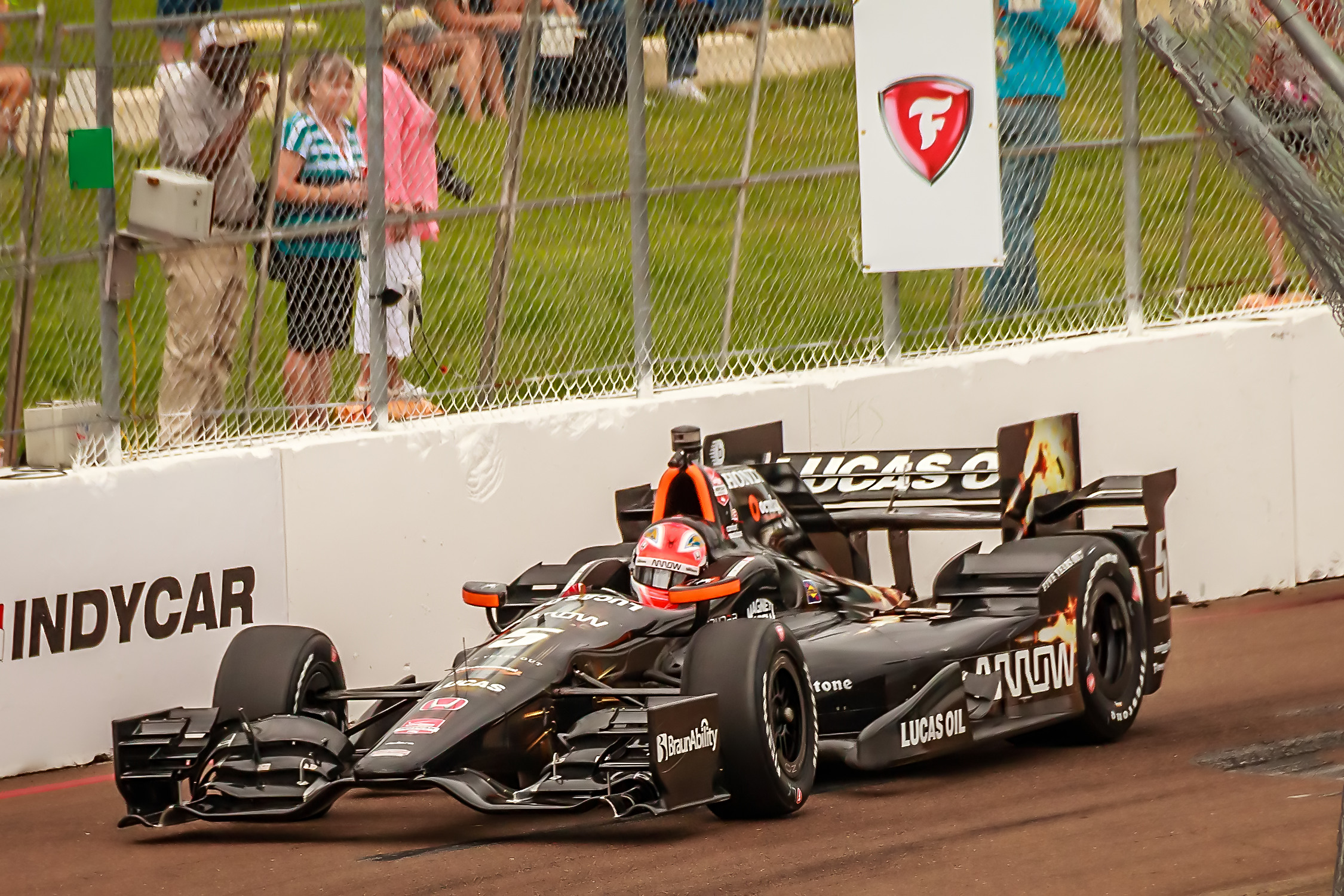
2015 Honda Aero kit, seen on the #5 Schmidt Peterson at the 2015 Saint Petersburg Grand Prix

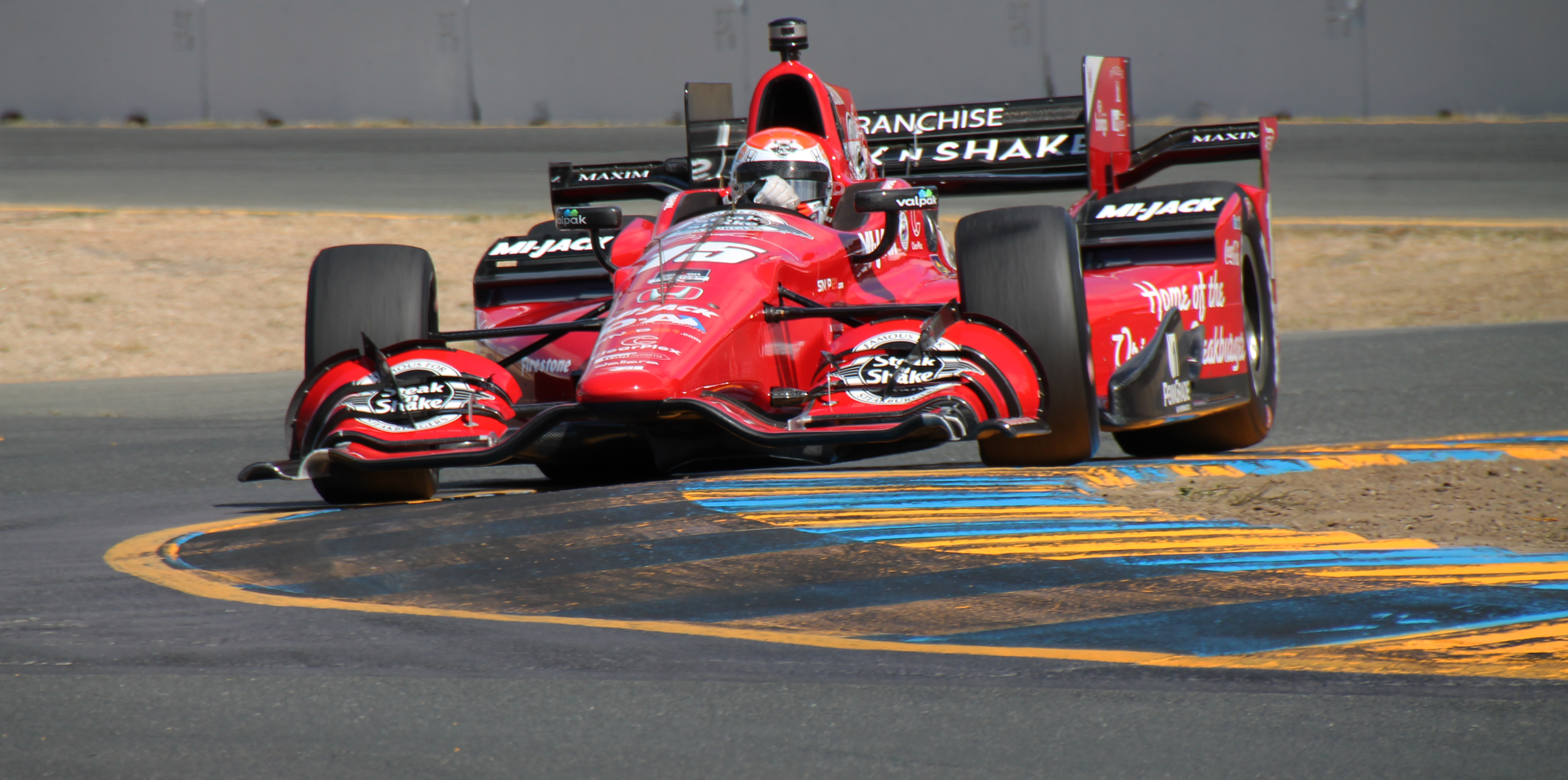
2015 Honda Road Course Aero kit, seen on the #15 Rahal Letterman Lanigan Racing

For the 2015 season, the universal aero kit provided by Dallara was retired, and replaced with individual manufacturer's aero kits. Honda and Chevrolet introduced their own in-house designed aero kits, in partnership with Wirth Research (Honda) and Pratt & Miller (Chevrolet), respectively.

The first official test of Chevrolet's aero kit was conducted at COTA by Will Power on October 17, 2014, followed by preseason testing at NOLA on March 14, 2015. The manufacturer's aero kits race debut was at the 2015 Firestone Grand Prix of St. Petersburg on March 29, 2015. Team Penske's Will Power won the inaugural pole and Juan Pablo Montoya won the first race with the DW12 Chevrolet aero kit.

In the first season of use, the Chevrolet aero kits had an edge over Honda, with Chevrolet teams winning all but six races during the season. However, at Indianapolis, three Chevy entries experienced frightening flip-over crashes, prompting a delay in pole qualifying, tweaks to the qualifying rules, and a safety examination during the offseason.

Midway through the season, both manufacturers introduced updates to their aero kits, with Honda losing its front wing endplates on safety grounds, and Chevrolet introducing an additional winglet.

In 2016, in response to the flipping incidents of Chevrolet-powered cars at the 2015 Indianapolis 500, domed skids were introduced. Zylon bodywork tethers were also added to the cars, to prevent loose bodywork from leaving a car, and striking another competitor, following the death of Justin Wilson, who was struck by loose bodywork. In addition, bodywork updates were issued by both manufacturers to their aerokits. Compared to the Chevrolet aero kit, the Honda kit saw numerous changes, with the front wing being altered from a stacked triple element, to a simpler dual element section, with a new endplate section introduced. In addition, new sidepods were introduced on the road course kit, while a new tyre ramp was introduced with it, and vents were added to the rear wing endplates. The Chevrolet Aero Kit was less dominant, compared to the previous season.

For the 2017 season, a developmental freeze was implemented, ahead of a planned introduction of a new universal aero kit for 2018.

== IR–18 Universal Aero Kit (UAK-18) (2018–2027) ==
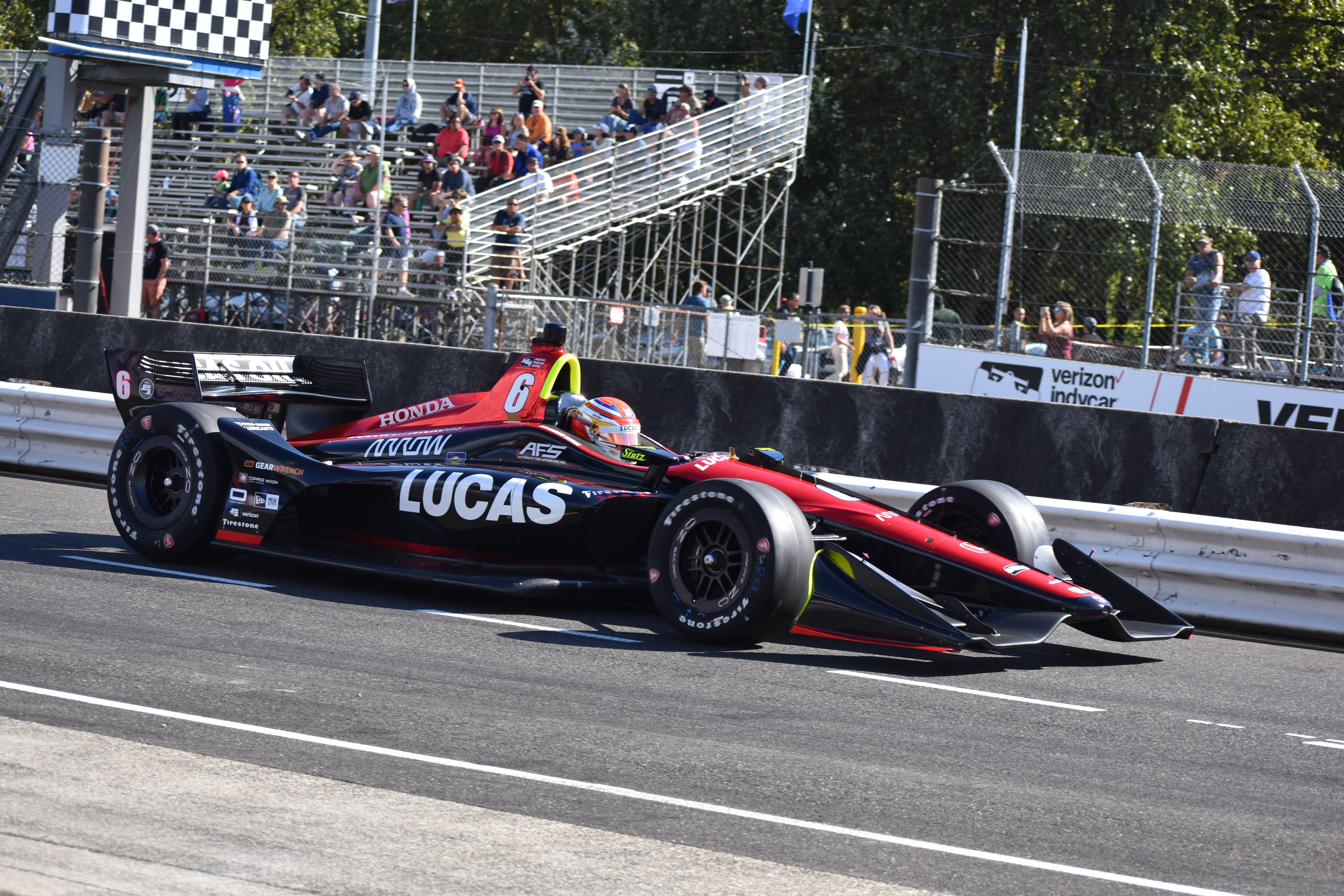
Carlos Muñoz driving the first UAK (without cockpit protection) in 2018

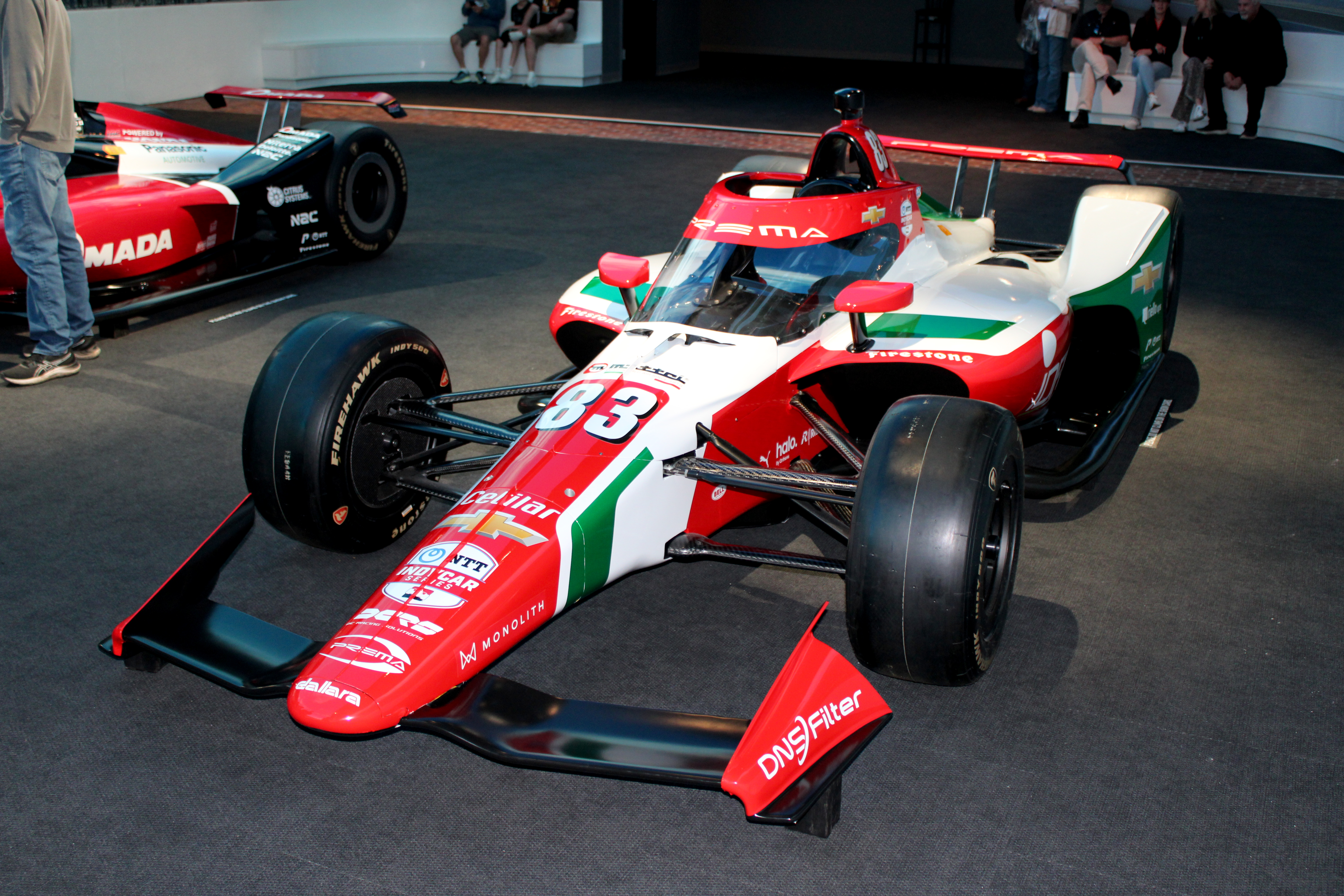
The 2025 Prema Racing DW12 utilizing the Universal Aero Kit with the aeroscreen

In March 2017, the IndyCar Series announced that the DW12 would receive a redesign and facelift of its aerodynamic system, with all cars running a universal aero kit starting in 2018. Named the UAK-18 (Universal Aero Kit 2018), the base Dallara Safety Cell chassis would remain as-was: however, several components, including the airbox and rear-wheel guards, would be removed. The latter were jettisoned as research and on-track results indicated that they were largely ineffective in reducing large crashes and would often break easily, as would other extraneous winglets. The new kits were designed to ensure that more downforce comes from ground effects than the wings, and the visuals were inspired by classic Indy car designs from the 1980s and 1990s. In addition, teams would save money as they no longer have to buy different base undertray chassis strictly for superspeedways such as Indianapolis. The same chassis can accommodate aero kits for both road/street/short oval courses and the longer ovals.

For the cockpit section, all IndyCar Series entrants began to utilize the all-new Cosworth CCW Mk2 steering wheel and also-new Configurable Display Unit 4.3 display dashes. Due to cost reasons, several smaller IndyCar Series teams (including part-timer and Indianapolis 500-only) still carried over the Pi Research Sigma Wheel digital display for one more season. The driver seats are slightly reprofiled to improve driver comfort as well as modifications such as a slight increase of cockpit length and width to better accommodate driver body height and weight. IndyCar Series was also in talks on the use of cockpit protection for the 2019 season such as the aeroscreen to avoid fatal crashes such as that of Justin Wilson in 2015. The aeroscreen was tested by Scott Dixon at ISM Raceway on February 9, 2018 and then by Josef Newgarden at Indianapolis Motor Speedway on April 30, 2018.

The initial new cockpit protection called "Advanced Frontal Protection" made its debut at the 2019 Indianapolis 500, while the new radical Aeroscreen cockpit protection was introduced for 2020 season developed by Red Bull Advanced Technologies.

The UAK-18 (with the 2020-adopted aeroscreen) with V-6 twin-turbocharged engine powerplant, was originally scheduled to be retired at the end of the 2023 season. It was to be replaced by a hybrid powerplant for the 2024 season. However, series officials delayed the rollout of the hybrid formula until July 2024. As a results, the chassis/engine package from 2023 was utilized for the first several races of the 2024 season, including the 2024 Indianapolis 500.

=== Hybrid engine formula (2024–2027) ===
The IndyCar Series is currently testing updated 2.4 liter V6 powertrains with 100bhp hybrid ERS units provided by German manufacturer Mahle, who has provided such power units to various motorsport categories, such as DTM and in automotive applications. The powertrains are currently in active development after being delayed from the originally scheduled 2023 debut due to the impact of the COVID-19 global pandemic affecting availability of manufacturing capacity for the hybrid power units to allow for manufacturer testing, as well as the desire from IndyCar manufacturer participants Chevrolet and Honda to delay the introduction of the hybrid powertrain to 2024 to allow for more testing, development and security in having the necessary parts to supply participating teams with the new powertrains. As of November 2022, there are currently no plans to introduce a new chassis in the near future, with previous plans to debut a new chassis for the 2024–25 seasons delayed to 2027 due to the impact of the pandemic delaying initial design and development from the January 2021 timeframe, with no immediate word on a replacement for the current DW12 UAK18. On December 16, 2024, it was announced that the series and Dallara would confirm its successor from 2027 onwards and thus the current chassis is scheduled to retire after the 2026 season however later delayed to 2028 season onwards.

In December 2022, IndyCar announced that the new engine formula scheduled to debut in 2024 had been delayed to 2027 but later delayed to 2028 due to economic problems. Instead, a hybrid system for the existing 2.2 liter V6 engines was introduced during the 2024 Honda Indy 200 at Mid-Ohio Sports Car Course. It has a 60 hp (45 kW), 33 lb⋅ft (45 N⋅m) electric motor coupled to a 320 kJ (90 Wh), 60-volt capacitor.

== Fatal accidents ==
The DW12 was the second Dallara IndyCar Series chassis to suffer a fatality in the IndyCar Series to date. At the 2015 ABC Supply 500 at Pocono Raceway, Justin Wilson died after being hit on his helmet by the nose cone of Sage Karam's crashed car. As of the end of the 2026 season, this was the last fatality to occur in the IndyCar series.
