= IndyCar Series =

Auto racing series held in North America

- Logo used since 2026
- Category: Open-wheel racing
- Region: United States; Canada
- Inaugural season: 1996
- Drivers: 33 (Note: This number includes part-time drivers/teams that only run in the Indianapolis 500 and other select races)
- Teams: 12
- Chassis suppliers: Dallara
- Engine manufacturers: Chevrolet; Honda
- Tire suppliers: Firestone (Bridgestone)
- Drivers' champion: (Spain) Álex Palou (2026)
- Makes' champion: Honda (2026)
- Official website: www.indycar.com

The IndyCar Series, officially known as the NTT IndyCar Series for sponsorship reasons, is the highest class of American open-wheel car racing in the United States, which has been conducted under the auspices of various sanctioning bodies since 1920. The series is self-sanctioned by its parent company, IndyCar, LLC, which began in 1996 as the Indy Racing League (IRL) and was created by then Indianapolis Motor Speedway owner Tony George as a competitor to Championship Auto Racing Teams (CART). In 2008, the IndyCar Series merged with CART's successor, the Champ Car World Series, unifying the history and statistics of both series (as well as those from their predecessors).

The series' premier event is the Indianapolis 500, which was first held in 1911 (which also gives the series its name 'IndyCar'). Historically, open-wheel racing was one of the most popular types of American motorsport.

An acrimonious schism (often referred to by many as "The Split") in 1994 between the primary series, CART, and Tony George led to the formation of the rival Indy Racing League in 1996, which launched the present-day IndyCar Series. From that point, the popularity of open wheel racing in the United States declined dramatically. The feud was settled in 2008 with an agreement to merge the two series under the IndyCar banner, but enormous damage had already been done to the sport. It would not be until the 2020 series purchase and re-organization under Roger Penske, along with the 2025 broadcast partnership with Fox Sports that IndyCar would begin to see an increase in viewership and interest again.

== Overview ==
=== Series name ===
For 1996–1997, the series was simply referred to as the Indy Racing League. For 1998–1999, the series garnered its first title sponsor, and was advertised as the Pep Boys Indy Racing League. In 2000, the series sold its naming rights to Internet search engine Northern Light, and the series was named the Indy Racing Northern Light Series.

The name IndyCar Series was officially adopted beginning in 2003, as the series was now legally entitled to use it due to the expiration of a 1996 legal settlement with Championship Auto Racing Teams (CART). The series began to progressively downplay the former IRL name, changing its name to simply IndyCar for the 2008 season. The company was similarly renamed in 2011.

Izod signed a six-year deal to become the series title sponsor beginning on November 5, 2009, through 2014, but the sponsorship was terminated at the end of the 2013 season. In 2014, Verizon Communications became title sponsor of the series through 2018. In January 2019, it was announced that Japanese communications company NTT would become title sponsor and official technology partner of the IndyCar Series. In 2023, IndyCar announced that NTT had extended their title sponsorship for an unreported duration.

American open-wheel car racing (IndyCar) sanctioning timeline
Sanctioning body	1905–		1910s	1920s	1930s	1940s	1950s	1960s	1970s	1980s		1990s		2000s	2010s	2020s
AAA		unofficial	WWI			WWII										
USAC										*						
CART										*	CART	IndyCar	CART	Champ Car		
IRL													IRL	IndyCar		
Golden bar indicates which body sanctioned the Indy 500 each year. White text indicates name of racing series (when applicable).

== Technical specifications ==
The IndyCar Series allows manufacturers to develop different types of engines, while every team uses the same chassis. Currently, Dallara provides a specification chassis to all teams, with Honda and Chevrolet providing teams different engines.

=== Chassis ===
==== 1996–2011 ====
In the series' first season (1996), 1992 to 1995 model year CART chassis built by Lola and Reynard were used. The first new Indycar came into being in 1997. Tony George specified new technical rules for less expensive cars and production-based engines. The move effectively outlawed the CART chassis and turbocharged engines that had been the mainstay of the Indianapolis 500 since the late 1970s.

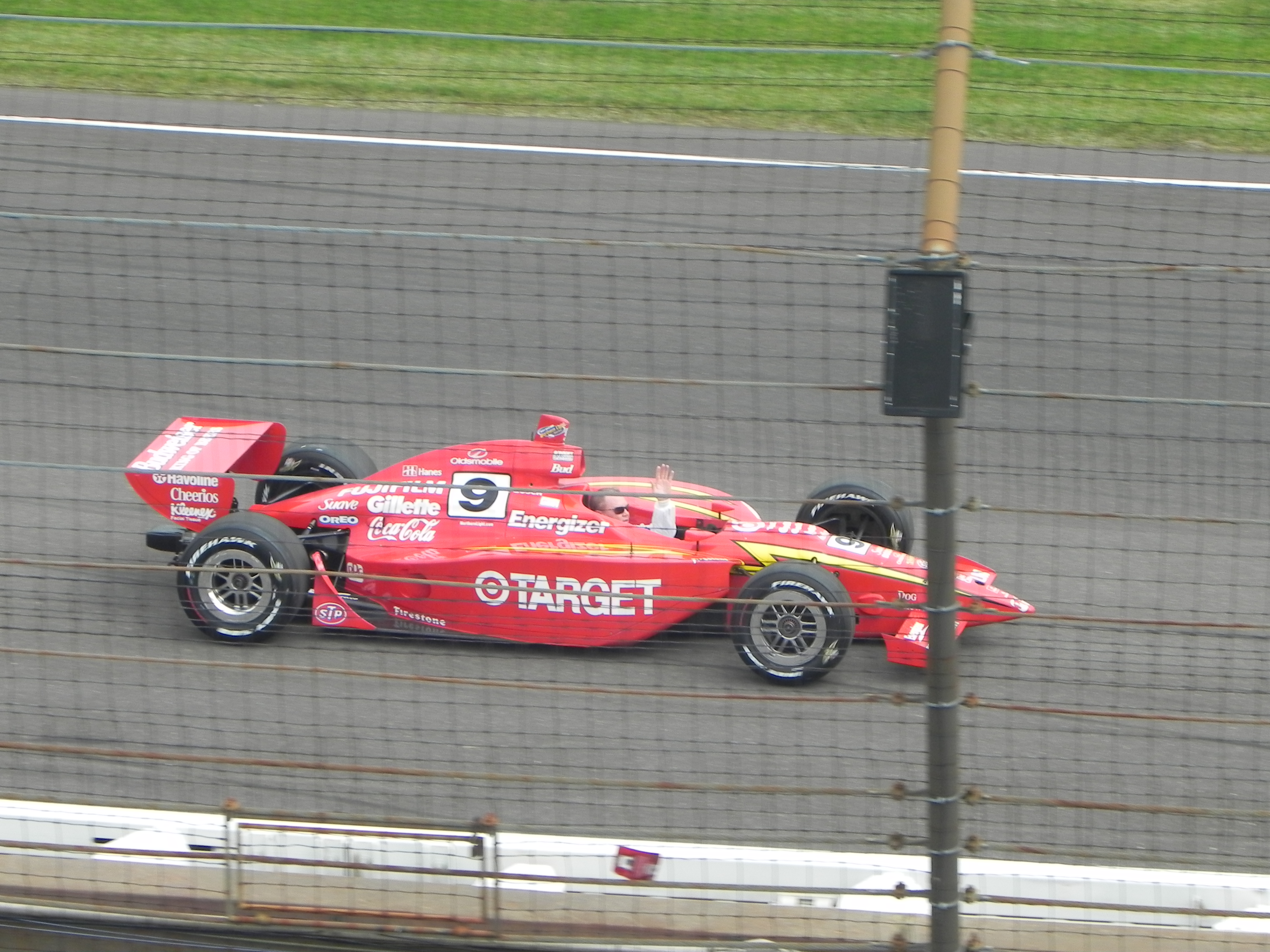
G-Force GF05 IRL car in which Juan Pablo Montoya won the 2000 Indianapolis 500.

Starting with the 2003 season, the series rules were changed to require chassis manufacturers to be approved by the league before they could build cars. Prior to that, any interested party could build a car, provided it met the rules and was made available to customers at the league-mandated price. In total, four manufacturers have built IndyCar chassis.

Dallara began producing Indycars for the 1997 season. The Dallara and G Force chassis were relatively evenly matched over their first few seasons, but eventually, the Dallara began to win more races. This caused more teams to switch to the Dallara, further increasing their success. As of 2017, a Dallara chassis has been used by 17 Indy 500 winners, although there have not been any competing manufacturers since 2008. Dallara was also tapped to build the Firestone Indy Lights machines. After the withdrawal of factory support from Panoz Auto Development, they are the only supplier of new chassis.

The G Force chassis was introduced in 1997 and won the 1997 and 2000 Indy 500 races. In 2002, Élan Motorsport Technologies bought G Force, and the chassis was renamed "Panoz G Force", and then shortened to "Panoz" in 2005. In 2003 a new model was introduced, and it won the Indy 500 in 2003–2004 and finished second in 2005. It fell out of favor starting in 2006, and by then, only one had finished in the top ten at Indy. Little factory support was given to IndyCar teams by Panoz after that point, as they had concentrated on their DP01 chassis for the rival Champ Car World Series. By 2008, only one Panoz saw track time, an aborted second-weekend effort at Indy, that resulted in Phil Giebler being injured in a practice crash.

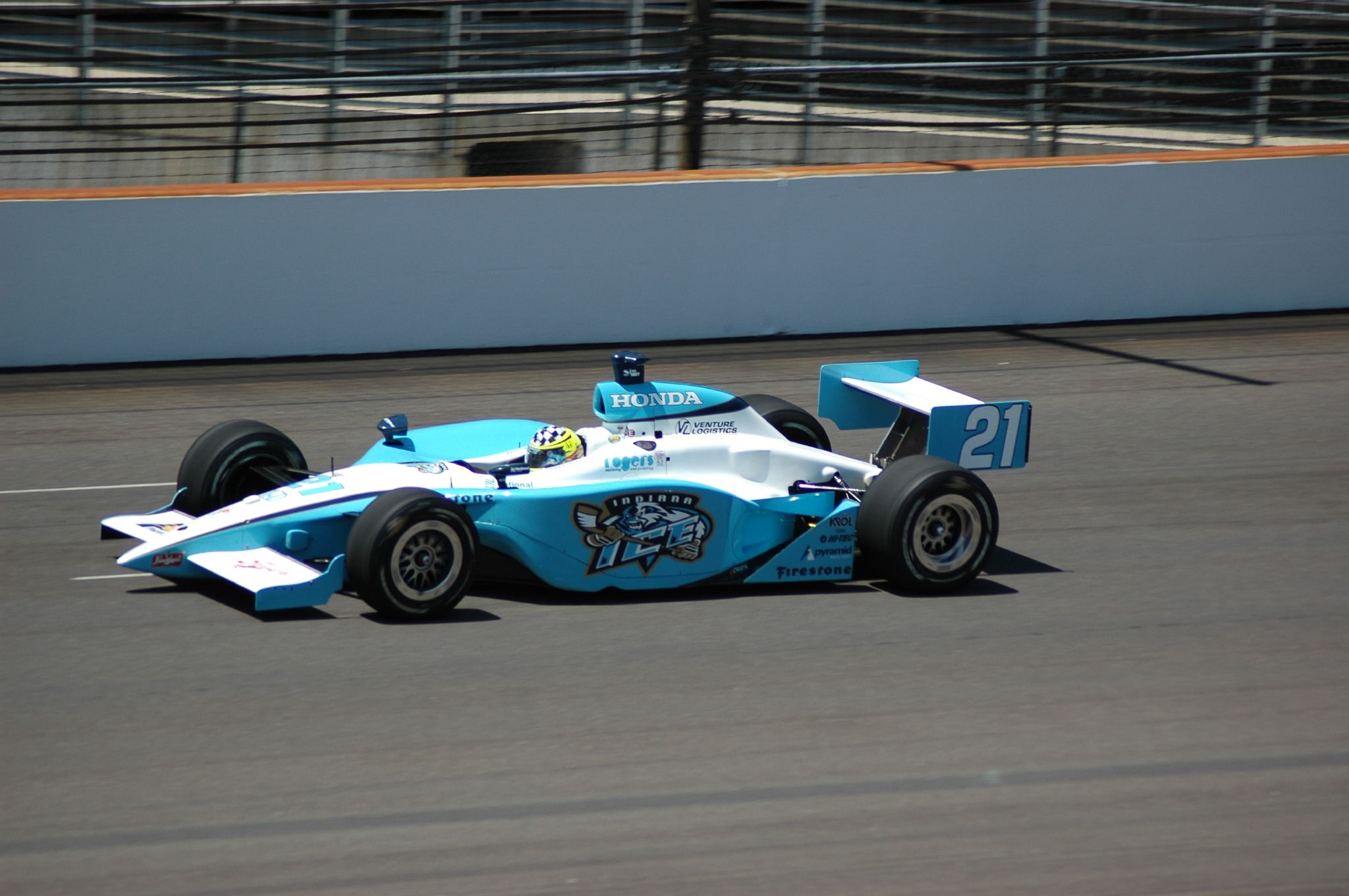
A Panoz GF09 Indycar Series chassis driven by Jaques Lazier during practice for the 2007 Indianapolis 500.

Riley & Scott produced IndyCar chassis from 1997 to 2000. Their initial effort, the Mark V, was introduced late in the 1997 season, severely limiting its potential market. It also proved to be uncompetitive. After Riley & Scott was purchased by Reynard, an all-new model, the Mark VII, was introduced for the 2000 season. It won in Phoenix, the second race of the season (driven by Buddy Lazier), but was off the pace at Indy and was quickly dropped by its teams.

Falcon Cars was founded by Michael Kranefuss and Ken Anderson in 2002 as the third approved chassis supplier for the 2003 season. One rolling chassis was completed and shown, but it was never fitted with a working engine and never ran. No orders were ever filled. Superficially, IndyCar machines closely resemble those of other open-wheeled formula racing cars, with front and rear wings and prominent airboxes. Originally, the cars were unique, being designed specifically for oval racing; for example, the oil and cooling systems were asymmetrical to account for the pull of liquids to the right side of the cars. Later cars were designed to accommodate the added requirements of road racing.

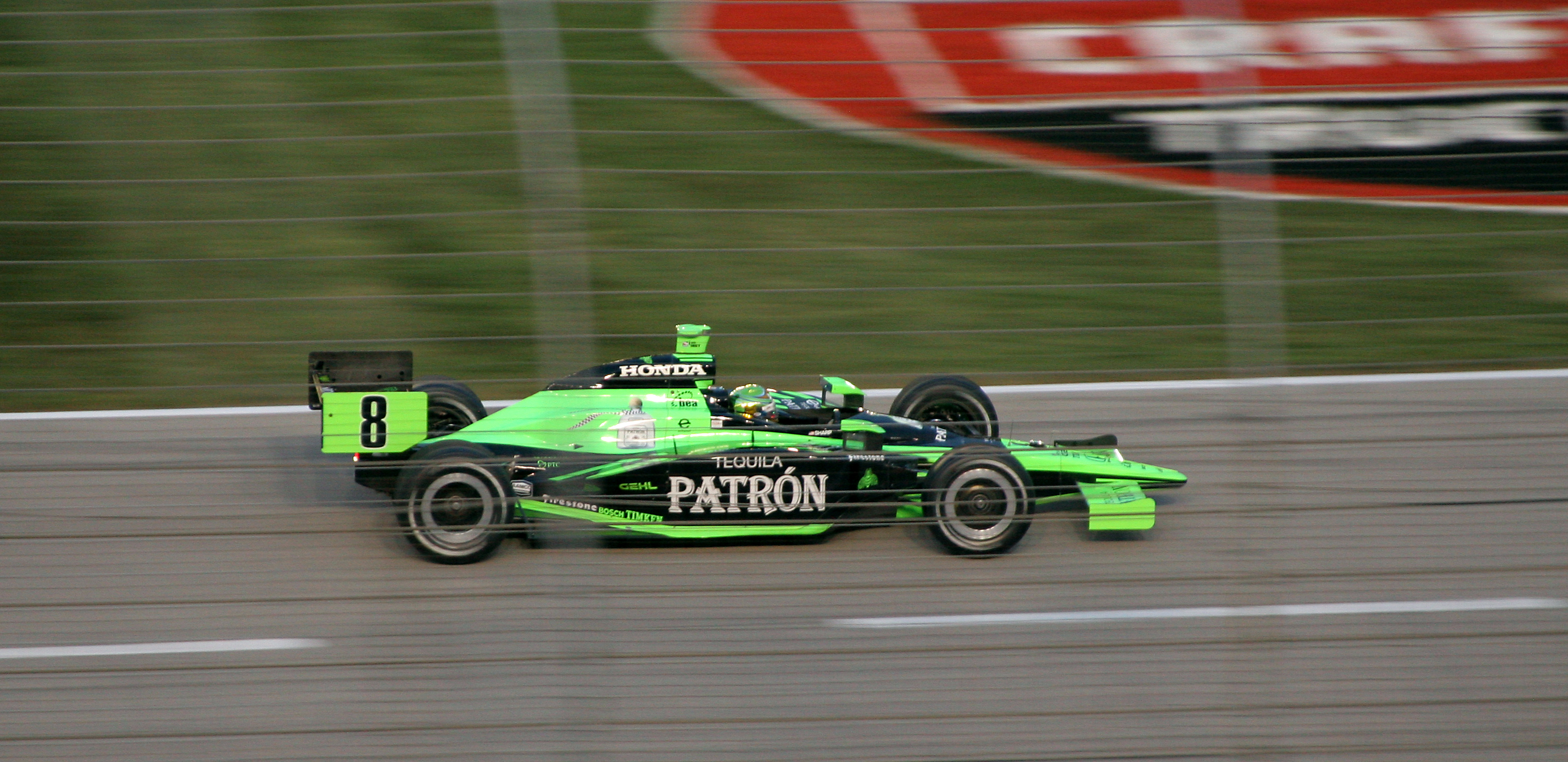
Dallara IR05 Indycar chassis driven by Scott Sharp at the 2007 Bombardier Learjet 550 at Texas Motor Speedway.

Because of a schedule conflict, the Champ Car World Series spec Panoz DP01, with a Cosworth engine, was run in an IndyCar Series points event in the 2008 Toyota Grand Prix of Long Beach.

==== 2012–2014 ====
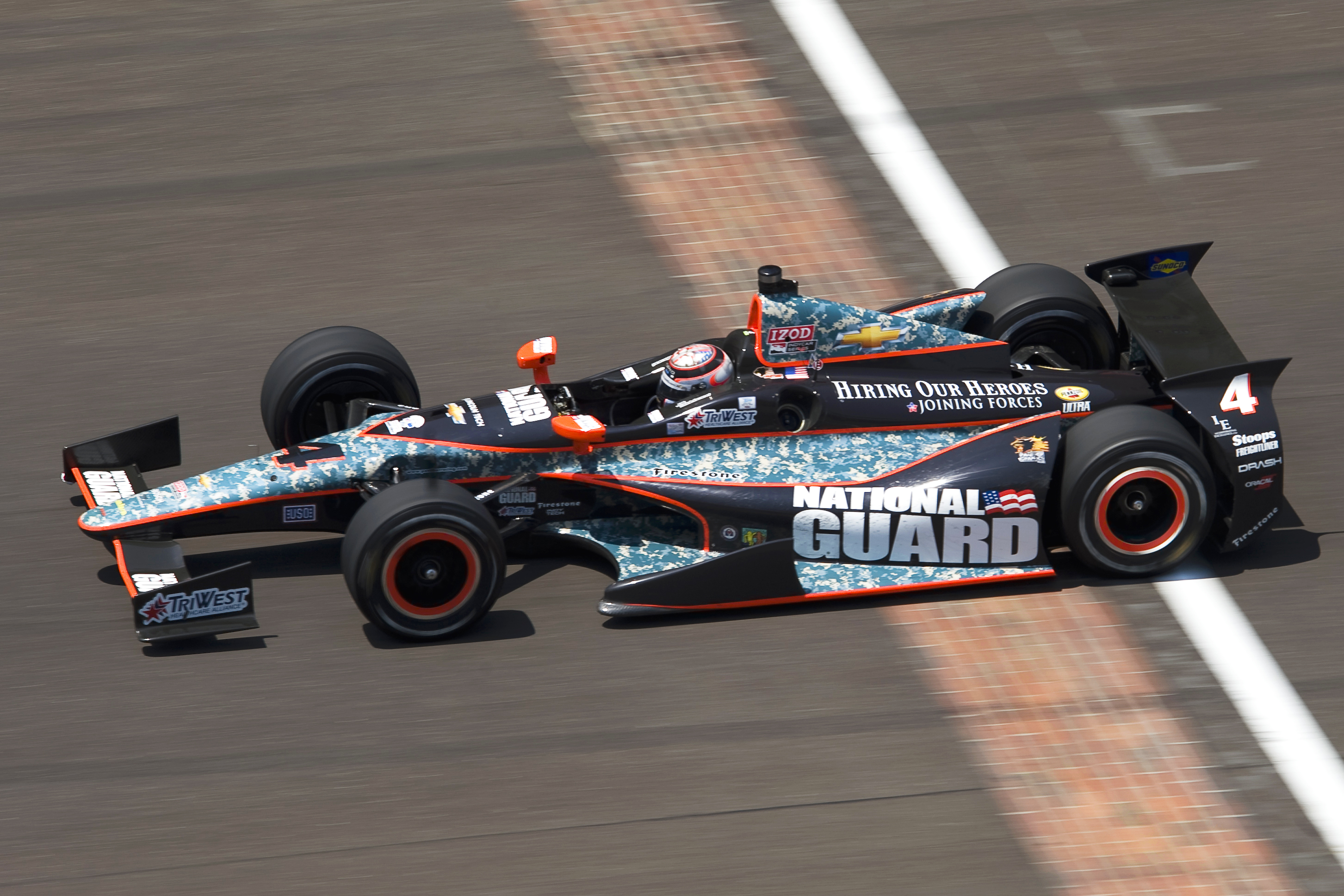
2012 DW12 chassis with the Speedway configuration driven by J. R. Hildebrand during practice for the 2012 Indianapolis 500. This initial version of the DW12 would be utilized during the 2012–2014 seasons.

In 2010, IndyCar announced that it would officially adopt a single-make chassis formula, beginning in 2012 among a selection of proposals from interested parties, and set up the ICONIC (Innovative, Competitive, Open-Wheel, New, Industry-Relevant, Cost-Effective) Advisory Committee to make a final recommendation. Proposals were submitted and announced by BAT Engineering, Dallara, Lola, Swift, as well as the radical DeltaWing design that was penned by Ben Bowlby and financed by Chip Ganassi.

In July 2010, IndyCar announced that Dallara had won the contract to remain as the series' single chassis supplier. In 2012 the series adopted the Dallara IR-12 chassis as a cost control method, and IndyCar negotiated a price of $349,000 per chassis. The new specification also improved safety, the most obvious feature being the partial enclosure around the rear wheels, which acts to prevent cars ramping up over another vehicle's back end. This chassis was intended to support multiple aerodynamic kits, but introduction of these was delayed until 2015, with teams citing costs.

After the events of the 2011 IZOD IndyCar World Championships the chassis was nicknamed DW12 in honor of Dan Wheldon.

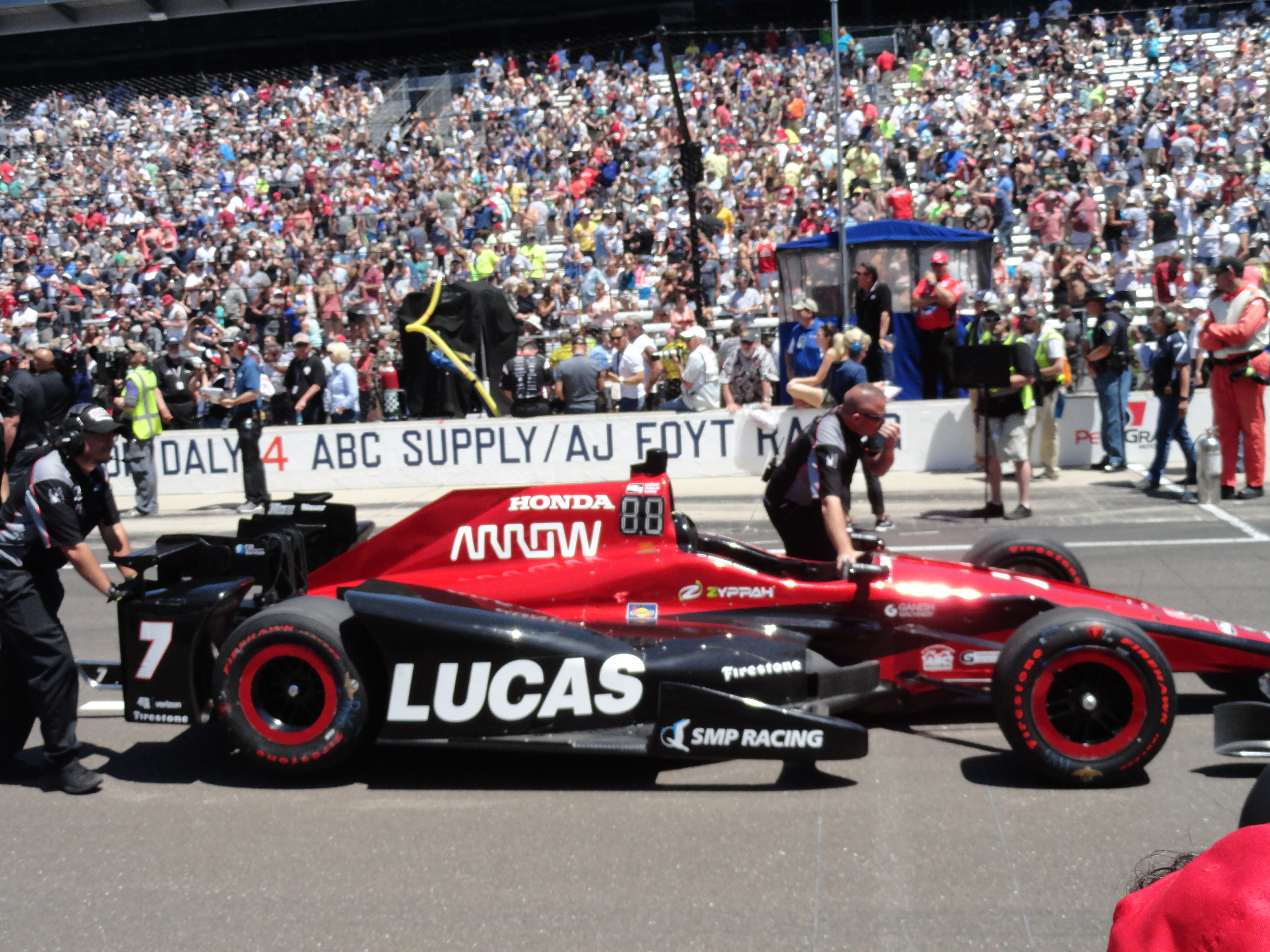
2017 DW12 chassis driven by Mikhail Aleshin during Carb Day before the 2017 Indianapolis 500. This was driven with the Honda version of the Separate Manufacture Aerokits that were used for the 2015–2017 seasons.

==== 2015–2017 ====
In 2015, teams began running aero kits developed by their engine manufacturers as a first-ever Dallara DW12 facelift. The kits, while increasing speeds and offering a clear distinction between the two manufacturers, led to significant cost increases. Further, Chevrolet's aero kit was the more dominant with Honda only able to mount a competitive charge on ovals due to having slightly better engine power. While Honda was able to make gains in 2016, after two years of development the kits were frozen for 2017, and starting in 2018 all cars ran the same aero package again. To further help reduce costs, IndyCar allowed teams to shop for competitively priced non-safety-related parts such as brakes instead of mandating parts from specific suppliers.

IndyCar had hoped to set a new speed record at the Indianapolis Motor Speedway by 2016 with the introduction of aero kits and the development work associated with them. However, after a series of safety concerns during practice for the 2015 Indianapolis 500 with the Chevrolet aero kit package, this did not come about.

==== 2018–present ====
The 2017 season was the third and final year contested with the Chevrolet and Honda aero kits outfitted to the Dallara DW12 chassis. Beginning in 2018, all DW12 Safety Cell chassis have been fitted with a universal bodywork kit. Digital renderings for the common bodywork kit, referred to as the 'IR18' car, were released in early May 2017 as a second facelift of Dallara DW12. The car was officially unveiled in late July, and the universal aero kit became known as the UAK18 bodywork.

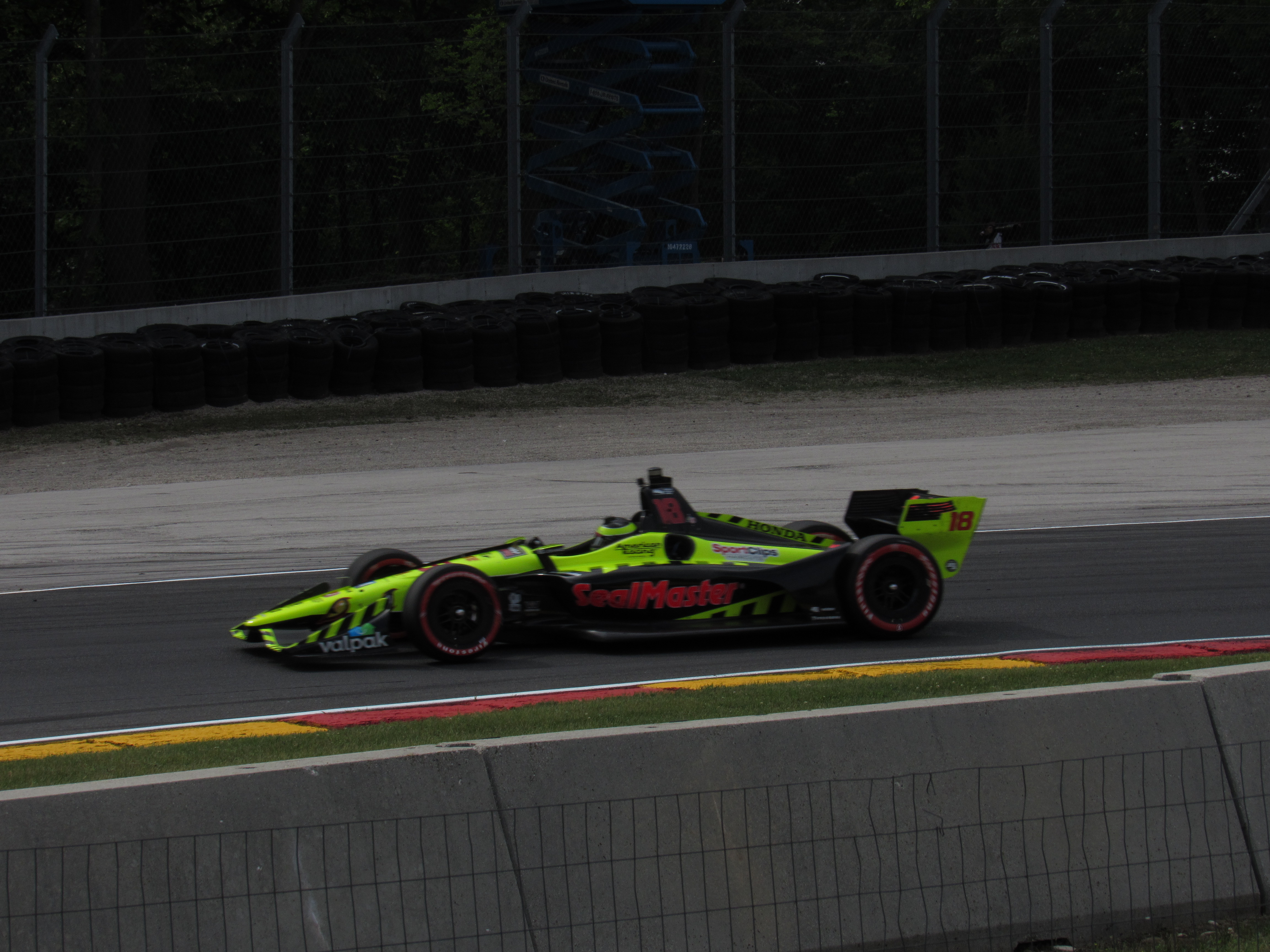
The IR18 chassis in its Road Course configuration, driven by Sébastien Bourdais during the 2018 Kohler Grand Prix at Road America.

The bodywork is inspired by CART's 1990s and 2000s designs, with a more streamlined appearance. The redesigned aero kit reduces both aerodynamic downforce and team and manufacturer design development costs. The universal Aero Kit was designed without the wheel guards of the DW12 chassis, which were deemed ineffective and proved prone to breaking. The IR-18 also lacks an air inlet above the cockpit, a first for an IndyCar Series chassis (most Champ Car chassis had been designed that way). The new Aero Kit also has fewer small aerodynamic pieces that can become broken or dislodged, with the intent to reduce the amount of debris that ends up on the track and expenses from repairs. The "aeroscreen" cockpit protection was added in time for the 2020 season, and some minor modifications were eventually conducted to reduce the intense heat caused by stagnant air on the drivers.

==== Planned replacement ====
Planning for a successor to the Dallara DW12 chassis was first publicly discussed on March 5, 2024, noting its age and the trend of open-wheel series replacing cars after five or so years, with the DW12 having last been revised in 2018. Dallara will still remain as the series's official chassis builder, partner, and supplier for the IR-27 era.

IndyCar announced on December 16, 2024, that it would begin wind tunnel testing of an all-new Dallara IR-27 chassis that is expected to début in the 2027 season.

On June 12, 2025, it was announced that the planned all-new chassis will be delayed to 2028 and renamed as Dallara IR-28.

=== Transmission and clutch ===
For the transmissions, all IndyCar Series cars currently use an electronically actuated AGS (Assisted Gearchange System) 6-speed semi-automatic sequential gearbox with an electro-pneumatically operated paddle-shift system and a pneumatic clutch with semi-automatic activation supplied by Xtrac Limited since the 2008 season. All current IndyCar transmissions use pneumatic actuation for the shifting and clutch, so the clutch is therefore only needed for launching the car from a standstill, and the clutch isn't required for gear shifting. From 1996 to 2007, all IndyCar Series cars used a hand-shifted 6-speed sequential manual transmission with a shift lever, supplied also by Xtrac since 2000 until 2007. The clutches of all IndyCars are carbon with steel housing 3-plate clutch operated by foot-pedal in 1996–2011 later hand-paddle steering wheel clutch in 2012–present and provided by AP Racing. Mechanical limited-slip differentials are permitted and constant velocity joint driveshafts are used. All IndyCar Series car drivetrains are currently rear mid-engine with rear-wheel-drive layout.

=== Brakes ===
Since the formation of the IndyCar Series in 1996, the brake package was slimmer carbon brake rotors with 4-pot calipers and carbon pads on all-oval races until 2011. Thicker steel brake rotors with 6-pot calipers and carbon pads were introduced in 2005 for road and street course races for stronger braking while approaching sharper turns. From 2012, IndyCar Series ditched the steel brake discs in favor of carbon brake rotors on all types of tracks but the caliper configuration remained the same as 1996–2011.

PFC has supplied brake packages for all IndyCar Series cars since the 2017 season, initially supplying discs only, and later increasing their involvement from the 2018 season, supplying the calipers and rest of the brake packages. Previously, Brembo supplied the brake packages in 2012–2016 (full brake package), 2017 (caliper only), and Alcon in 2003–2011.

=== Wheels ===
BBS and O.Z. Racing have been supplying forged wheels since 1996. The wheels for all IndyCar Series cars are made of aluminum alloy. The size of IndyCar Series wheels have been 10 in × 15 in (254 mm × 381 mm) on the front and 14 in × 15 in (356 mm × 381 mm) on the rear since 1996; this size would be used until at least the 2022 season. 18-inch wheels will be adopted if the Dallara DW12's successor comes out for the 2023 season onward.

=== Tires ===
Firestone has been a tire supplier for the series since the 1996 season and sole tire supplier since 2000. Goodyear had supplied tires from 1996 to 1999 for several teams before withdrawing their support. The IndyCar Series has run bespoke compounds since 1996 which were re-profiled in 2003. The front tire sizes are 305/45-R15 (10.0/25.8-R15) and the rear tire sizes are 415/40-R15 (14.5/28.0-R15). The compounds and construction of IndyCar Series tires are unique to each mounting position on the car. For road/street events, there are unique primary and alternative specifications for dry conditions, along with specially designed full-rain tires for all rain conditions; however, unlike in Formula One which has intermediate rain tires for light-rain conditions, there are no intermediate rain tires due to cost. For oval racing, a single set of specifications is used based upon the configuration and speed of the track, as well as having the right rear tires slightly larger than the left rear (known as stagger) to aid in high-speed cornering.

=== Suspension ===
The suspension of all IndyCar Series cars is double A-arm, pushrod, with third spring and anti-roll bar configuration multilink.

=== Cockpit and safety components ===
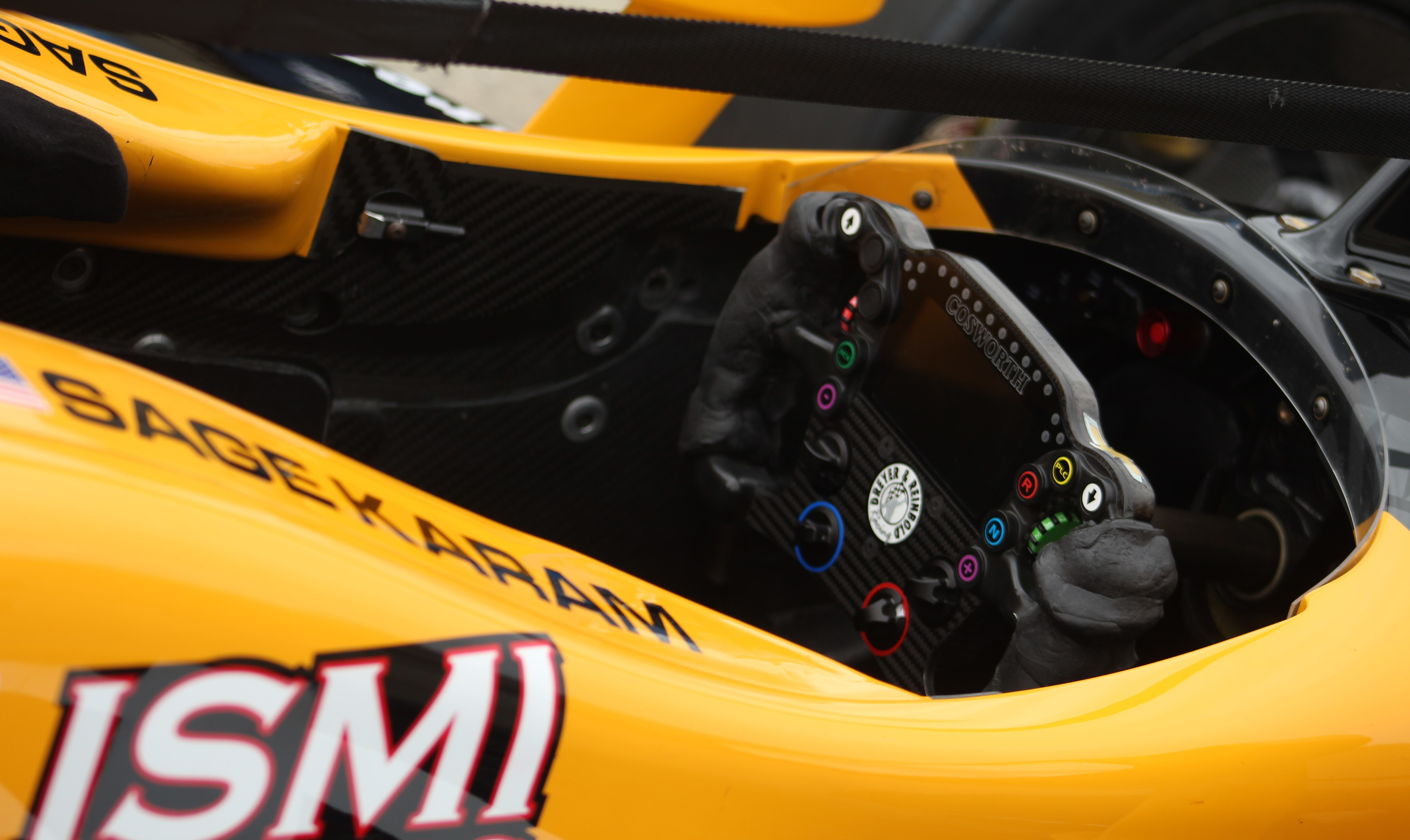
Cosworth CCW Mk2 steering wheel in the cockpit of Sage Karam's car.

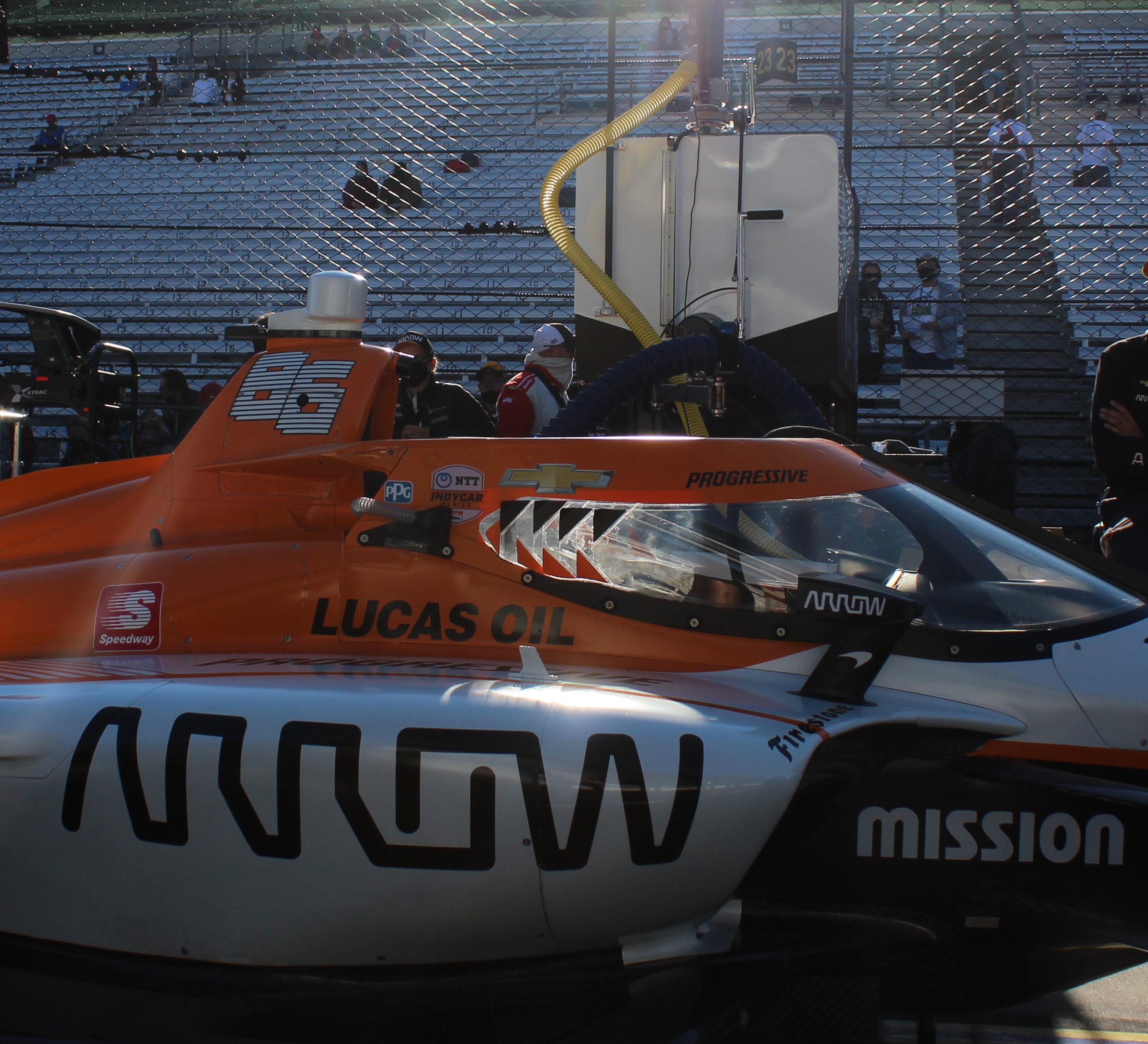
Aeroscreen on Juan Pablo Montoya's car.

All NTT IndyCar Series cars use carbon-fiber shell driver's seats with 6-point safety restraints. The cars' steering wheels are designed by Cosworth with a system of buttons that allow the drivers to make adjustments to their cars in-race. From 2001 to 2017, IndyCar Series cars were equipped with Pi Research Sigma Wheel to display data, until they were replaced by Cosworth's Configurable Display Unit 4.3 display from 2018 on (although in 2018 some smaller low-budget IndyCar Series teams utilized old Pi Research Sigma Wheels instead of new Cosworth Configurable Display Unit 4.3 due to cost reasons).

The cockpits of all IndyCar Series cars are open but protected by zylon, a foot protection bulkhead, and cockpit padding.

Beginning in the 2020 season, the IndyCar Series implemented a cockpit protection system. This consists of a combination of the Halo mandated in Formula One and a reinforced windscreen dubbed the "aeroscreen", provided by Red Bull Advanced Technologies, to lessen the probability of traumatic head injuries from flying debris.

=== Other components ===
All IndyCar Series cars carry an Electronic Control Unit. Live telemetry is used only for television broadcasts, but the data can be recorded from the ECU to a computer if the car is in the garage and not on the track. Since 2007 McLaren supplied its Engine Control Unit (ECU) system for a few IndyCar Series teams and later became the standard Engine Control Unit (ECU) from the 2010 season. Previously, Motorola supplied IndyCar Series ECUs in 2003–2009 for Honda-powered cars, and Denso supplied IndyCar Series ECUs in 2003–2005 for Toyota-powered cars. Zytek supplied IndyCar Series ECUs in 2002–2005 for Chevrolet-powered cars.

Rearview mirrors for all IndyCar Series cars are fully mandated.

=== Fuel ===
==== Methanol ====
At its inception, the IRL used methanol racing fuel, which had been the de facto standard in American open-wheel racing since the 1964 Indianapolis 500 Eddie Sachs–Dave MacDonald crash. Methanol provides a safer alternative to gasoline. It has a higher flash point, is easily extinguishable with water, but burns invisibly. With the IRL's introduction of night races in 1997, the burning of methanol fuel was visible for the first time, seen with a light blue haze. With this in mind, in an effort to make it more visible in case of fire during daylight hours, additional mixtures were placed in the fuel. As a safety feature, the methanol would burn with color.

==== Ethanol ====
In 2005, the driver Paul Dana brought the sponsorship of the Ethanol Promotion and Information Council (EPIC) to his IndyCar team. EPIC is a consortium of ethanol producers that advocate the increased use of ethanol. EPIC was anxious to address public concerns of that era that ethanol use led to engine damage and poor performance when used in road cars. As a marketing effort, it was believed that sponsoring an IndyCar could be used as a tool to promote education and awareness of ethanol use and to curb the spread of erroneous information.

Dana was killed in a crash in 2006, but the IRL had already begun a transition to ethanol fuel. For the 2006 season the fuel was a 90%/10% mixture of methanol and ethanol. Starting in 2007, the league advertised "100% Fuel Grade Ethanol," the first competitive series to utilize renewable fuel. The mixture was actually 98% ethanol and 2% gasoline, provided by Lifeline Foods of Saint Joseph, Missouri. The additives satisfy the U.S. government's demand that the alcohol is unfit for human consumption and add visible color in case of fire. However, 2010 São Paulo Indy 300, held in Brazil—outside of the U.S. regulations–utilized a full E100 mixture, the first instance in the sport.

To compensate for the loss of power due to the use of ethanol, the displacement was increased back to 3.5 liters. Since ethanol gets better fuel mileage than methanol, the fuel tank capacity was decreased.

Compared to methanol, human contact with the current ICS fuel is much less harsh and the fumes much less irritating. The fumes are often compared with the sweet smell of apple cider or apple cobbler. Unlike methanol, ethanol is not caustic and does not cause chemical burns when it comes in contact with skin. It also is less polluting when spilled compared to methanol.

In May 2010, Sunoco became the official fuel of the series starting from mid-2010 through 2018. For the 2012 season, the ethanol fuel blend rate was reduced to 85% in a reference of road car relevance. Speedway LLC took over as series official fuel supplier beginning from 2019 season, but the E85 formula remained to 2022.

From 2023, Shell USA (North American division of Shell plc) would supply 100% ethanol-sourced fuel for the first time since 2011.

==== Fuel cell ====
The fuel cells for all current IndyCar Series cars are made of rubber and are covered with a Kevlar-fitted blanket for extra protection in side impacts. Since 2012, the capacity has been 18.5 US gallons (70 litres). Previous capacities were 22 US gallons (83 litres) in 2007–2011, 30 US gallons (114 litres) in 2004–2006, and 35 US gallons (132 litres) in 1997–2003.

=== Engines ===
==== First generation (1996) ====
===== Engine competition era (1996) =====
The initial 1996 IRL season, as well as the first two races of the 1996–97 season, featured engines with specifications left over from the rival CART series competition. Those chassis/engine combinations were essentially under the same rules utilized by teams that participated in the 1995 Indianapolis 500, which was sanctioned by USAC. V-8 powerplants were allowed with 45 inHg (1.5 bar; 22.1 psi) of boost. The Menard-Buick V6 engine used in 1996, however, was an updated powerplant from the 1995 version. In addition, the V-6 stock block engines (Buick-Menard) were allowed 55 inHg (1.9 bar; 27.0 psi) of boost at all races, instead of just at Indianapolis. During the CART era, V-6 stock blocks were only allowed 45 inHg (1.5 bar; 22.1 psi) at all races outside of Indy, which was a decided disadvantage and left the engine out of favor.

Ford-Cosworth reluctantly provided support to teams wishing to run their older-spec engines in the IRL, a major point of contention for CART management, to whom Ford-Cosworth was an official engine supplier. The Ilmor Mercedes V-8 engine, also a mainstay CART powerplant, was permitted, but the only time it was used was at the 1996 Indy 500 by Galles Racing.

==== Second generation (1997–2011) ====
===== Normally aspirated engines, competition era 1997–2005 =====
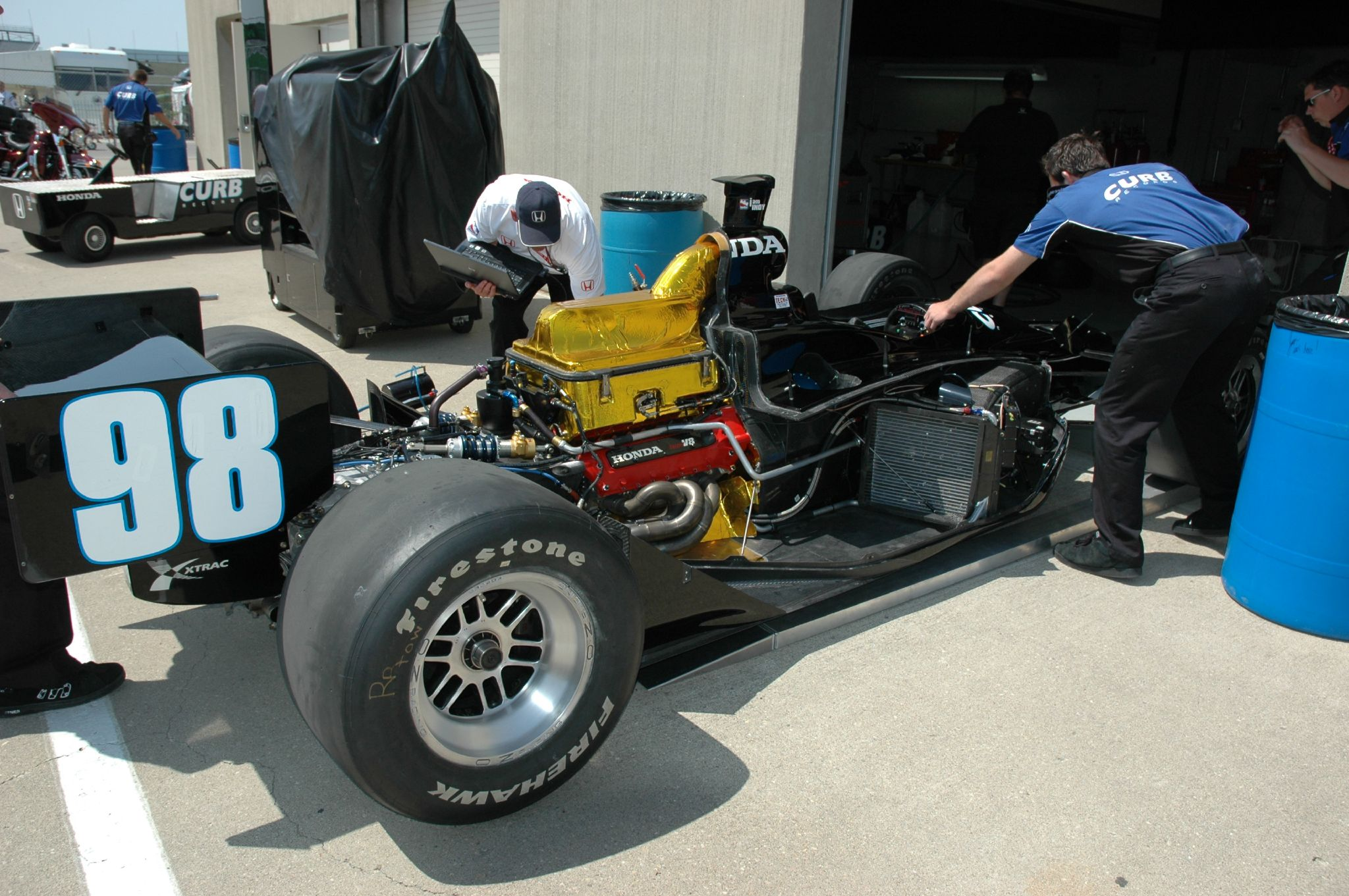
Honda Indy V8 engine on the car

Starting in 1997, IRL cars were powered by 4.0-litre V8, four-stroke, piston, Otto cycle, methanol-burning, production prototype-based, naturally aspirated, internal combustion engines and electronic indirect multi-point port fuel injection, produced by General Motors (under the Oldsmobile Aurora label) and Nissan (badged as Infiniti). Per IRL rules, the engines sold for no more than $80,000 (with an exception of full-works IndyCar Series teams that usually received free engines due to direct partnership with an each engine manufacturer), were rev-limited to 10,000 rpm, and weighed up to 280 lb (127 kg) (excl. headers, clutch, ECU, spark box or filters). They produced around 600–700 hp (450–520 kW). These engines utilized 90° crankshafts and while the engine blocks were to be production-based, they were not "stock blocks" like the Buick or Menard engines of the 1980s and 1990s. They were purpose-built racing engines.

The engine formula was changed with the 2000–2004 formula. The displacement was dropped from 4.0 to 3.5 litres (244 to 214 cubic inches), and the requirement for the block to be production-based was dropped and thus the former 4.0-liter V8 normally-aspirated Indy Racing League engine regulations transferred to newly resurrected Deutsche Tourenwagen Masters from 2000 to 2018. The engines also switched to 180° crankshafts, and the rev limits were adjusted from time to time. These engines made 675 hp (503 kW), ran on 109-octane methanol racing fuel, and revved to 10,300 rpm, all while weighing only 280 lb (130 kg). This formula was used through 2003. In 2004, in the wake of several crashes including the fatal crash of Tony Renna and the severe crash of Kenny Bräck, the displacement was reduced to 3.0 liters using the existing engine blocks to curb top speeds (started from the 2004 Indianapolis 500).

Infiniti's engines, though reliable, were significantly less powerful compared to the Auroras in 1997, leading many of the teams that had initially opted for the Infiniti to switch. By the end of the 1998 season, only a handful of low-budget teams were using the Infiniti, however, early in the 1999 season Cheever Racing, a well-funded team, was brought on to develop the engine with team owner Eddie Cheever expanding the team to two cars and bringing on his brother Ross Cheever as a test driver. By 2000, the engine had improved markedly and Cheever captured the marque's first win at Pikes Peak International Raceway. Despite the success, few teams made the switch to the Infiniti and the company left the series after the 2002 season to focus on powering the league's new Infiniti Pro Series (now Firestone Indy Lights) cars.

As part of General Motors' discontinuance of the Oldsmobile brand, the Olds engine was rebadged as Chevrolet starting with the 2002 season. The effort would lack in competitiveness against Toyota and Honda, which came to the IRL in 2003 from the rival CART series. In August 2003, Chevrolet announced to the public its "Gen IV" motor, a rebadged Cosworth engine, for competition. At the time, Cosworth was owned by Ford. On November 4, 2004, Chevrolet stated that it would be ending its IRL engine program effective with the end of the 2005 season, citing costs that exceeded value, according to then GM Racing Director Doug Duchardt, "The investment did not meet our objectives."

Toyota won its first race in Miami, as well as the Indianapolis 500 and the series title. However, Toyota had just one podium in the last seven races of 2004, and only Penske Racing fielded competitive Toyota-powered cars in 2005, while Honda became the series' dominant engine manufacturer. In November 2005, Toyota company officials announced the company's withdrawal from American open-wheel racing and the immediate discontinuation of its IRL program, coinciding with its entrance into NASCAR's Craftsman Truck Series in 2004, and its discontinuation of its IMSA program.

===== Single-manufacturer spec engine era (2006–2011) =====
After Chevrolet and Toyota elected to shut down their IRL involvement after 2005 season (Chevrolet temporarily hiatus from IndyCar Series for six years while Toyota USA elected to focus on NASCAR involvement), Honda became the only standard spec-engine manufacturer in the IndyCar Series starting in 2006 and continued in that capacity through 2011 as it was announced by Indy Racing League president & chief operating officer Brian Barnhart and Honda Performance Development president Robert Clarke on December 15, 2005. The IndyCar Series carried on with only one engine manufacturer in spite of the television agreement required at least two or three engine manufacturers to participate in the series to ensure future continuity. The Honda Indy V8 engine was partnered and co-developed by Ilmor, which is part owned by Roger Penske for tune-up, engine maintenance, arrangement and trackside support. The engine displacement was reverted from 3.0 to 3.5 litres (183 to 214 cubic inches) beginning from 2007 season.

During that time, since the IndyCar Series had only one engine manufacturer, Honda focused on minimizing engine failure and minimizing costs instead of defeating rivals. As such, the engines were moderately de-tuned. The engines proved themselves to be quite durable—there had been no engine failures at Indy from 2006 to 2010, which also lowered the number of crashes. Most of the engines, including those used for the Indy 500, are used for multiple races and were intended to last 1,200 miles (1,931 kilometres) between rebuilds. The Honda engines were only available via lease arrangement from Honda, which, for the 2010 full season, cost $935,000 U.S. per season, per car.

IndyCar Series engines were rev-limited to 10,300 rpm and produce approximately 650 hp. A 'push-to-pass' system was intermittently adopted since the middle portion of the 2009 season, which increased the numbers to 10.500 rpm and 690 hp when employed. The valve train is a dual overhead camshaft configuration with four valves per cylinder. The fuel feed of Honda Indy V8 engine was an electronic indirect multipoint port fuel injection. The crankshaft is made of alloy steel, with five main bearing caps. The pistons are forged aluminum alloy, while the connecting rods are machined alloy steel. The electronic engine management system is supplied by Motorola, firing a CDI digital inductive ignition system. The engine lubrication is a dry-sump type, cooled by a single water pump. In 2009, Honda froze the Indy V8 engine development for the 2009–2011 seasons due to Honda focusing on a new third-generation V6 turbo engine for the 2012 season.

==== Third generation (2012–present) ====
The current, third-generation IndyCar formula was introduced in 2012 including two new manufacturers, and marked the return of the IndyCar Series engine manufacturer competition war since the 2005 season. The engines are now fuel-efficient DOHC 2.2-liter twin-turbo V6 with four-stroke piston Otto cycle developing an estimated 550–750 hp depending on the level of boost used and no inter-cooling systems. They are limited to 12,000 rpm and a weight minimum of 248 lb (112 kg). Engines are currently supplied by Chevrolet and Honda. Since the 2012 season, McLaren has supplied its TAG-400i engine control unit. The current engine fuel injector delivery now combines direct and electronic indirect injection which produces roughly 300 bar (4,351 psi) of rail pressure. No fuel flow restriction exists in the IndyCar Series engine configuration. Chevrolet returned to the series in 2012 to provide all-new, Ilmor developed and engineered, V6 twin-turbocharged engines after six-year hiatus while Honda still remain committed to the series also to provide all-new V6 single-turbocharged engines in the same year. Lotus Cars provided an engine developed by Judd in 2012, but left the series in 2013 after lack of interest from teams in running the underdeveloped and uncompetitive Lotus engine. The electric push-to-pass overtake system was reintroduced during the 2012 Honda Indy Toronto race, and is still in use today. The electric overtake system produces roughly 60 hp (45 kW) with a duration lasting between 6 and 200 seconds. This system is rechargeable, and its duration of use varies based on the track's dimensions. Porsche expressed interest in joining the series as a third engine supplier in 2019. Ultimately Porsche backed out when IndyCar refused to allow them to field a hybrid powertrain. Coincidentally, IndyCar announced its plans for a hybrid powertrain one month later. Chevrolet was the first engine manufacturer to utilize the twin-turbocharged configuration alongside Lotus in 2012 while Honda was utilized the single-turbocharger in 2012–2013. Honda abandoned the single-turbocharged after 2013 in favor of twin-turbochargers from 2014 until the present. From 2024 season onwards the hybrid systems will be introduced, consisting of a multi-phase motor, inverter, and battery that will create energy recovery from the car's braking system as well as current engine displacement still remained.

=== Turbocharger ===
Having been absent since 1997, turbochargers were reintroduced for the start of the 2012 season. The turbo configuration that has been mandated since 2014 is a twin-turbo with the pressure range restricted to 1.3–1.6 bar (19–23 psi) depending on track shape. American turbocharger company BorgWarner is the exclusive supplier of turbocharger kits, with all cars since the 2014 season using the EFR7163 model in order to save costs. Previously the BorgWarner EFR9180 single turbo was used exclusively by Honda-powered cars, while BorgWarner EFR6758 twin turbos were used by Chevrolet and Lotus (2012) powered cars. Usually turbocharged-engined gasoline cars incorporate intercoolers, but IndyCar Series cars do not use an intercooler kit to avoid additional weight; ethanol fuel burns at lower temperatures which helps keep the engine cool.

=== Spark plugs ===
Bosch (Chevrolet) and NGK (Honda) have provided spark plugs for all IndyCar Series cars since 2012. Previously NGK was an exclusive spark plugs supplier in 2006–2011 when Honda was the standard IndyCar Series engine supplier. Previously Denso also was a sparkplugs supplier in 2003–2005 for Toyota-powered cars.

=== Performance ===
The current IndyCar Series car top speed is approximately 235–240 mph (378–386 km/h) on the Indianapolis Motor Speedway oval layout only. On intermediate and long ovals the top speed is approximately 215–220 mph (346–354 km/h), and on road/street courses and short ovals, it is approximately 200–210 mph (322–338 km/h) depending on downforce setup.

== Racetracks ==
Races in the IndyCar Series as of the 2026 season. Red dots represent ovals, blue dots represent road courses, black dots represent street circuits. Indianapolis hosts a road course and oval race; Milwaukee hosts two oval races.

After the split from IndyCar World Series, the Indy Racing League began as a pure oval race series. Alongside the prestigious Indy 500, the 1-mile oval tracks of Phoenix and Loudon were added to the schedule. In addition, the Hulman family oversaw the planning for the construction of a new track at Walt Disney World in Florida. On the new Walt Disney World Speedway the first IRL race took place in January 1996.

After the series was established, ovals used mainly by NASCAR were raced on. These included the newly built racetracks in Las Vegas and Fort Worth as well as the existing speedways of Charlotte and Atlanta. After a series of major accidents at Charlotte and Atlanta and a lack of spectator turnout, however, the ovals of Atlanta, Charlotte, and Las Vegas were removed from the calendar. For the 2001 season, the IRL also began to race on ovals that were being used by CART. The circuits of Homestead and Gateway changed from CART to the calendar of the IRL, with the race at Walt Disney World being dropped in favor of Homestead. In addition, the new 1.5-mile ovals of Kansas, Kentucky, and Chicagoland were added. These tracks were the backbone of the IRL until 2011. After Roger Penske sold his racetracks (Fontana, Michigan, and Nazareth) to the International Speedway Corporation, the IRL began racing at these tracks in the 2002 season. Nazareth Speedway only held three races before ISC closed the track in 2004. Michigan Speedway was raced until the 2007 season and the Auto Club Speedway, formerly California Speedway, until the 2015 season.

The first major change took place in the 2005 season. For the first time in the history of the IRL, races were held at road and street courses. A street course race in St. Petersburg has been added to the calendar. In addition, races at Sonoma and Watkins Glen, the two NASCAR road course circuits were added. In 2007, the Mid-Ohio Sports Car Course was added. After the Champ Car World Series was dissolved in 2008, some of their races were taken over by the IndyCar Series. These are the street races of Long Beach, Detroit, and Toronto, and starting in 2016, Road America. In addition, a road course race at Barber Motorsports Park in Birmingham and an oval race at Iowa Speedway were scheduled and held.

The second big change took place in the 2012 season. In 2011, the series returned to Las Vegas Motor Speedway for the first time since 2000. However, the circuit had been rebuilt for NASCAR, increasing the banking of 12 degrees to progressive banking up to 20 degrees. This new configuration led to tight pack racing. Additionally, a $5 million bonus was offered if a driver from another series or racing discipline won the race, as it would be the last race for the current chassis, and a record 34 cars entered this race (the Indy 500 field, by comparison, is capped at 33 cars). As a result of pack racing in combination with many cars and inexperienced drivers, a major crash occurred on lap 11, injuring several drivers and resulting in the death of defending Indy 500 winner Dan Wheldon. This event led to massive media criticism of oval races for open-wheel vehicles. As a result, and also because of the gradual loss of spectators in the previous seasons, all oval races on 1.5-mile speedways, except Texas Motor Speedway, were removed from the calendar. Only the oval races in Indianapolis, Milwaukee, Iowa, Texas, and Fontana remained for the next three seasons. Instead, more races were held in cities, including Houston, Baltimore, and São Paulo. In the following years, the calendar stabilized, with the return of races in Phoenix, Pocono, and Gateway, although the races at Fontana, Pocono, Phoenix, and Milwaukee were later removed from the schedule due to insufficient crowds or severe crashes, including the fatal crash of Justin Wilson at Pocono in 2015.

Since the 2012 season, the calendar has roughly consisted of 1/3 oval races, 1/3 races on permanent road courses, and 1/3 races on temporary street courses in larger cities. In 2019, an IndyCar race was held for the first time on a current Formula 1 racetrack, the "Indycar Classics" at the Circuit of the Americas in Austin, Texas.

Due to government restrictions on major events in 2020 due to the COVID-19 pandemic, many races that were scheduled for the 2020 season were affected. For the first time since 1911, the Indianapolis 500 was not held on the traditional Sunday before Memorial Day. In addition, traditional street races in Long Beach, Detroit, and Toronto were canceled. As compensation, double-header races took place in Road America, Iowa, Mid-Ohio, and Gateway.

Texas Motor Speedway was removed from the schedule for the 2024 season after the series and track were unable to agree on a date. In October 2024, it became official that IndyCar Series would return to the north of Texas for the Grand Prix of Arlington set for March 2026. The 2.73-mile track was set up at the Arlington Sports District around AT&T Stadium and Globe Life Field.

== Teams ==
Team	Engine	Base	Founding year
A.J. Foyt Enterprises	Chevrolet	Speedway, Indiana	1965
Andretti Global	Honda	Indianapolis, Indiana	1993
Arrow McLaren	Chevrolet	Indianapolis, Indiana	2001
Chip Ganassi Racing	Honda	Indianapolis, Indiana	1990
Dale Coyne Racing	Honda	Plainfield, Illinois	1984
ECR	Chevrolet	Indianapolis, Indiana	2012
Juncos Hollinger Racing	Chevrolet	Indianapolis, Indiana	1997
Meyer Shank Racing	Honda	Pataskala, Ohio	1989
Rahal Letterman Lanigan Racing	Honda	Zionsville, Indiana	1991
Team Penske	Chevrolet	Mooresville, North Carolina	1968

== Championship point system ==
Like other governing bodies, IndyCar awards points based upon where a driver finishes in a race. The winner of a race gets 50 points. The top four drivers are separated by ten, five and three points respectively. The fourth through tenth-place finishers are separated by two points each. Eleventh through twenty-fifth are separated by one point each. All other drivers who start the race score five points. Bonus points are awarded as follows: one point to the driver that earns the pole each race (except at Indianapolis), one point to any driver that leads at least one lap in a race, and two additional bonus points to the driver that leads the most laps each race.

For the Indianapolis 500, qualifying points are awarded for all 33 cars at the Indianapolis 500. The point scale slides based on the teams that qualify for the top-nine shootout, then descending by speed and position.

From 2014 to 2022, the Indianapolis 500 awarded double points for all finishing positions. Beginning in 2023, double points were dropped and drivers earned the same points as any other race.

In the case of a tie, the IndyCar Series will determine the champion based on the most first-place finishes. If there is still a tie, IndyCar Series will determine the champion by the most second-place finishes, then the most third-place finishes, etc., until a champion is determined. IndyCar Series will apply the same system to other ties in the rankings at the close of the season and at any other time during the season.

== Seasons ==
The following table is a list of championships going only as far back as the latest sanctioning body's existence. However, championships that took place before that period (under previously existing sanctioning bodies) are also counted as part of one continuous championship following the merger of CART/Champ Car into the Indy Racing League in 2008. That is when the IRL acquired all intellectual property and historic records, going as far back as 1909.

Season	Drivers' Champion				Engine Manufacturers' Champion	Rookie of the Year	Most Popular Driver
Season	Driver	Team	Chassis	Engine	Engine Manufacturers' Champion	Rookie of the Year	Most Popular Driver
1996 (Note: In 1996, Scott Sharp and Buzz Calkins were tied in the final standings and were declared co-champions. Calkins had one win, as opposed to Sharp being winless, but no tiebreakers were in place.)	(United States) Scott Sharp	A. J. Foyt Enterprises	Lola	Ford-Cosworth	not awarded	not awarded	not awarded
1996	(United States) Buzz Calkins	Bradley Motorsports	Reynard	Ford-Cosworth	not awarded	not awarded	not awarded
1996–97	(United States) Tony Stewart	Team Menard	Lola; G-Force	Menard; Oldsmobile	Oldsmobile	(United States) Jim Guthrie	(Netherlands) Arie Luyendyk
1998	(Sweden) Kenny Bräck	A. J. Foyt Enterprises	Dallara	Oldsmobile	Oldsmobile	(United States) Robby Unser	(Netherlands) Arie Luyendyk
1999	(United States) Greg Ray	Team Menard	Dallara	Oldsmobile	Oldsmobile	(United States) Scott Harrington	(Canada) Scott Goodyear
2000	(United States) Buddy Lazier	Hemelgarn Racing	Riley & Scott; Dallara	Oldsmobile	Oldsmobile	(Brazil) Airton Daré	(United States) Al Unser Jr.
2001	(United States) Sam Hornish Jr. (1)	Panther Racing	Dallara	Oldsmobile	Oldsmobile	(Brazil) Felipe Giaffone	(United States) Sarah Fisher
2002	(United States) Sam Hornish Jr. (2)	Panther Racing	Dallara	Chevrolet	Chevrolet	(France) Laurent Rédon	(United States) Sarah Fisher
2003	(New Zealand) Scott Dixon (1)	Chip Ganassi Racing	G-Force	Toyota	Toyota	(United Kingdom) Dan Wheldon (Note: Although it was Scott Dixon's first year in the IRL IndyCar Series and he won the championship, he was not considered a rookie because of earlier CART experience.)	(United States) Sarah Fisher
2004	(Brazil) Tony Kanaan	Andretti Green Racing	Dallara	Honda	Honda	(Japan) Kosuke Matsuura	(United States) Sam Hornish Jr.
2005	(United Kingdom) Dan Wheldon	Andretti Green Racing	Dallara	Honda	Honda	(United States) Danica Patrick	(United States) Danica Patrick
2006 (Note: In 2006, Sam Hornish Jr. and Dan Wheldon were tied in the final standings for first place. This time, IndyCar had tiebreakers, and Hornish clinched the championship by having more victories than Wheldon during the season.)	(United States) Sam Hornish Jr. (3)	Penske Racing	Dallara	Honda (Note: Between 2006 and 2011, Honda was the sole engine manufacturer of the series and thus no engine manufacturers' championships were awarded during this period.)	not awarded	(United States) Marco Andretti	(United States) Danica Patrick
2007	(United Kingdom) Dario Franchitti (1)	Andretti Green Racing	Dallara	Honda	not awarded	(United States) Ryan Hunter-Reay	(United States) Danica Patrick
2008	(New Zealand) Scott Dixon (2)	Chip Ganassi Racing	Dallara	Honda	not awarded	(Japan) Hideki Mutoh	(United States) Danica Patrick (Note: Although no report was officially released about it in 2008, IndyCar.com confirmed in 2009 that Danica Patrick being named Most Popular Driver was her "fifth consecutive" win of the award.)
2009	(United Kingdom) Dario Franchitti (2)	Chip Ganassi Racing	Dallara (Note: Since 2009, Dallara is the sole chassis manufacturer of the series.)	Honda	not awarded	(Brazil) Raphael Matos	(United States) Danica Patrick
2010	(United Kingdom) Dario Franchitti (3)	Chip Ganassi Racing	Dallara	Honda	not awarded	(United Kingdom) Alex Lloyd	(United States) Danica Patrick
2011 (Note: The 2011 season was originally supposed to end at Las Vegas, but the death of Dan Wheldon in an early crash caused IndyCar to abandon the race. The points reset to the standings as of the scheduled penultimate race at Kentucky, with Franchitti winning the championship.)	(United Kingdom) Dario Franchitti (4)	Chip Ganassi Racing	Dallara	Honda	not awarded	(Canada) James Hinchcliffe	(United Kingdom) Dan Wheldon (Note: Posthumously awarded to Dan Wheldon by a vote of members on the official IndyCar Nation website. This marked the first time a part-time driver won the award.)
2012	(United States) Ryan Hunter-Reay	Andretti Autosport	Dallara	Chevrolet	Chevrolet	(France) Simon Pagenaud	(Canada) James Hinchcliffe
2013	(New Zealand) Scott Dixon (3)	Chip Ganassi Racing	Dallara	Honda	Chevrolet	(France) Tristan Vautier	(Brazil) Tony Kanaan
2014	(Australia) Will Power (1)	Team Penske	Dallara	Chevrolet	Chevrolet	(Colombia) Carlos Muñoz	(Colombia) Juan Pablo Montoya
2015 (Note: In 2015, Dixon and Juan Pablo Montoya finished tied in points, Dixon winning the title based on wins (3 to 2).)	(New Zealand) Scott Dixon (4)	Chip Ganassi Racing	Dallara	Chevrolet	Chevrolet	(Colombia) Gabby Chaves	(United Kingdom) Justin Wilson (Note: Posthumously awarded to Justin Wilson by a vote of members on the official IndyCar Nation website. This marked the second time a part-time driver won the award.)
2016	(France) Simon Pagenaud	Team Penske	Dallara	Chevrolet	Chevrolet	(United States) Alexander Rossi	(United States) Bryan Clauson (Note: Posthumously awarded to Bryan Clauson by a vote of members on the official IndyCar Nation website. This marked the third time a part-time driver won the award.)
2017	(United States) Josef Newgarden (1)	Team Penske	Dallara	Chevrolet	Chevrolet	(United Arab Emirates) Ed Jones	(United States) Conor Daly
2018	(New Zealand) Scott Dixon (5)	Chip Ganassi Racing	Dallara	Honda	Honda	(Canada) Robert Wickens	(Canada) James Hinchcliffe
2019	(United States) Josef Newgarden (2)	Team Penske	Dallara	Chevrolet	Honda	(Sweden) Felix Rosenqvist	not awarded
2020	(New Zealand) Scott Dixon (6)	Chip Ganassi Racing	Dallara	Honda	Honda	(Netherlands) Rinus VeeKay	(United States) Alexander Rossi
2021	(Spain) Álex Palou (1)	Chip Ganassi Racing	Dallara	Honda	Honda	(New Zealand) Scott McLaughlin	(France) Romain Grosjean
2022	(Australia) Will Power (2)	Team Penske	Dallara	Chevrolet	Chevrolet	(Denmark) Christian Lundgaard	not awarded
2023	(Spain) Álex Palou (2)	Chip Ganassi Racing	Dallara	Honda	Chevrolet	(New Zealand) Marcus Armstrong	not awarded
2024	(Spain) Álex Palou (3)	Chip Ganassi Racing	Dallara	Honda	Chevrolet	(Sweden) Linus Lundqvist	not awarded
2025	(Spain) Álex Palou (4)	Chip Ganassi Racing	Dallara	Honda	Honda	(United Kingdom) Louis Foster	not awarded
2026	(Spain) Álex Palou (5)	Chip Ganassi Racing	Dallara	Honda	Honda	(Norway) Dennis Hauger	not awarded

== Statistics ==
=== Championships by driver ===
Driver	Total	Seasons
(New Zealand) Scott Dixon	6	2003, 2008, 2013, 2015, 2018, 2020
(Spain) Álex Palou	5	2021, 2023, 2024, 2025, 2026
(United Kingdom) Dario Franchitti	4	2007, 2009, 2010, 2011
(United States) Sam Hornish Jr.	3	2001, 2002, 2006
(United States) Josef Newgarden	2	2017, 2019
(Australia) Will Power	2	2014, 2022
(United States) Scott Sharp	1	1996
(United States) Buzz Calkins	1	1996
(United States) Tony Stewart	1	1997
(Sweden) Kenny Bräck	1	1998
(United States) Greg Ray	1	1999
(United States) Buddy Lazier	1	2000
(Brazil) Tony Kanaan	1	2004
(United Kingdom) Dan Wheldon	1	2005
(United States) Ryan Hunter-Reay	1	2012
(France) Simon Pagenaud	1	2016

=== Championships by team ===
Team	Total	Seasons
Chip Ganassi Racing	14	2003, 2008, 2009, 2010, 2011, 2013, 2015, 2018, 2020, 2021, 2023, 2024, 2025, 2026
Team Penske	6	2006, 2014, 2016, 2017, 2019, 2022
Andretti Autosport	4	2004, 2005, 2007, 2012
A. J. Foyt Enterprises	2	1996, 1998
Team Menard	2	1997, 1999
Panther Racing	2	2001, 2002
Bradley Motorsports	1	1996
Hemelgarn Racing	1	2000

=== Championships by engine manufacturer ===
Manufacturer	Total	Drivers' titles	Manufacturers' titles
Honda	24	16 (2004, 2005, 2006, 2007, 2008, 2009, 2010, 2011, 2013, 2018, 2020, 2021, 2023, 2024, 2025, 2026)	8 (2004, 2005, 2018, 2019, 2020, 2021, 2025, 2026)
Chevrolet	18	8 (2002, 2012, 2014, 2015, 2016, 2017, 2019, 2022)	10 (2002, 2012, 2013, 2014, 2015, 2016, 2017, 2022, 2023, 2024)
Oldsmobile	10	5 (1996–97, 1998, 1999, 2000, 2001)	5 (1996–97, 1998, 1999, 2000, 2001)
Toyota	2	1 (2003)	1 (2003)
Ford-Cosworth	1	1 (1996)	0

== Broadcasting ==
The three-race inaugural season was televised on ABC. The 1996–97 season was broadcast by ABC, CBS and ESPN. In 1998, TNN was added to the rotation. In 1999, Fox Sports Net aired the majority of the races, and the remaining ones aired on Fox, ABC and ESPN2. From 2000 to 2008, ABC and ESPN were the exclusive television partners of the Indy Racing League.

In 2009, Versus (later NBCSN) and ABC began a 10-year deal with IndyCar, NBCSN broadcast 13 IndyCar races per season, whereas the remaining races, including the Indianapolis 500, would remain on ABC. As of the 2018 season, ABC aired 5 races per-season (plus two days of qualifying for the Indianapolis 500), with NBCSN or other NBCUniversal cable networks (in the event of scheduling conflicts) airing the remainder of the schedule.

On March 21, 2018, NBC Sports announced an agreement to become the sole U.S. rightsholder for the IndyCar Series under a new three-year contract beginning in 2019; NBCSN continued as the primary broadcast outlet for most races, and overflow content would be available through the "IndyCar Pass" service on its subscription streaming platform NBC Sports Gold. Eight to as many as 13 races per-season would be televised by NBC—including the Indianapolis 500, marking the first time in 54 years that the race was not televised by ABC. In 2021, the contract was renewed through the 2024 season; with the closure of NBCSN and NBC Sports Gold, their coverage moved to USA Network and Peacock respectively. Peacock would also hold exclusive rights to at least one race per-season.

On June 13, 2024, IndyCar announced that its media rights would move to Fox Sports beginning in the 2025 season under a multi-year deal; all IndyCar Series races will air on Fox, while shoulder content such as qualifying (outside of the Indianapolis 500, whose weekend qualifying sessions will be carried on Fox) and Indy NXT events will air on FS1 and FS2.

=== International ===
In the United Kingdom and the Republic of Ireland, since the launch of BT Sport in August 2013 races are shown on one of the BT branded channels or ESPN. Previous to August 2013, the IndyCar Series races were broadcasts on the Sky Sports family of networks, with the viewing figures of the IndyCar races in the UK and ROI outnumbering those of NASCAR races. The IndyCar Series also had highlights of all the races on the channel Five British terrestrial channel and Five USA, but has since been discontinued since the 2009 season, while Sentana, which became Eir Sports in 2016, was where all highlights where shown in the Republic of Ireland until the start of 2013, when they became the sole provider for Irish IndyCar coverage until the end of the BT partnership at the end of 2018. For the 2019 season, IndyCar broadcasts returned to Sky Sports in both Countries, with the series being shown on their Sky Sports F1 channel.

In Portugal, all of the IndyCar Series are broadcast on Sport TV.

In February 2013, Sportsnet announced that it would become the official Canadian broadcaster of the IndyCar Series beginning in the 2013 season in a five-year deal with the series. The new contract will include broadcasts on the Sportsnet regional networks, Sportsnet One, and City, along with mobile coverage and French rights sub-licensed to TVA Sports. Additionally, Sportsnet would also originate coverage from the Firestone Grand Prix of St. Petersburg, Indianapolis 500, and Honda Indy Toronto with Bill Adam, Todd Lewis, and Rob Faulds. Canadian driver Paul Tracy also joined Sportsnet as an analyst. In 2023 it was announced that TSN would broadcast IndyCar for the first time since 2012.

In Australia, Stan Sport is IndyCar's broadcast partner with highlights also broadcast on Nine Network.

In Brazil, DAZN is IndyCar's broadcast partner in that country since 2019, with all races, qualifying and practice sessions live. Previously, SBT broadcast the first two races of IRL, but following complaints by Tony George because of the schedule of the transmission (VTs at 1:30AM), and because they also aired the CART series, he took the transmission rights from Emerson Fittipaldi gave them to Rede Bandeirantes to broadcast that year's season from the Indy 500 onwards. Band aired the series from 1996 to 2001 and from 2004 until 2020 (the latter period together with BandSports). SporTV also broadcast races from 2001 until 2004. In 2021, the event was broadcast by TV Cultura. The 2022 season will also be broadcast by ESPN (in cable and streaming by Star+).

ESPN is the international broadcast partner of IndyCar Series in the rest of Latin America until 2018 and again since 2022 season.

Eurosport has been the international broadcast partner of IndyCar in most of Europe (except in Bosnia and Herzegovina, Russia, and the United Kingdom).

In the late 2000s, the official website streamed online all races, qualifying and practice sessions unrestricted. That service is now limited in the United States to subscribers of the broadcast partner streaming service (currently Fox One). In 2022, IndyCar launched its streaming service (branded as IndyCar Live) to viewers in certain international territories without local broadcast partner.

== Logo history ==
2008 (in conjunction with DirecTV HD)

2016–2018

2019–2025

2025–present

== See also ==
- American open-wheel car racing
- IndyCar Rookie of the Year
- List of Indycar Engine Manufacturer Championship winners
- List of Indycar races
- List of IndyCar Series teams
- List of IndyCar Series racetracks
- List of Indycar Series drivers
