= Mercury Cougar =

Ford Motor Company car model

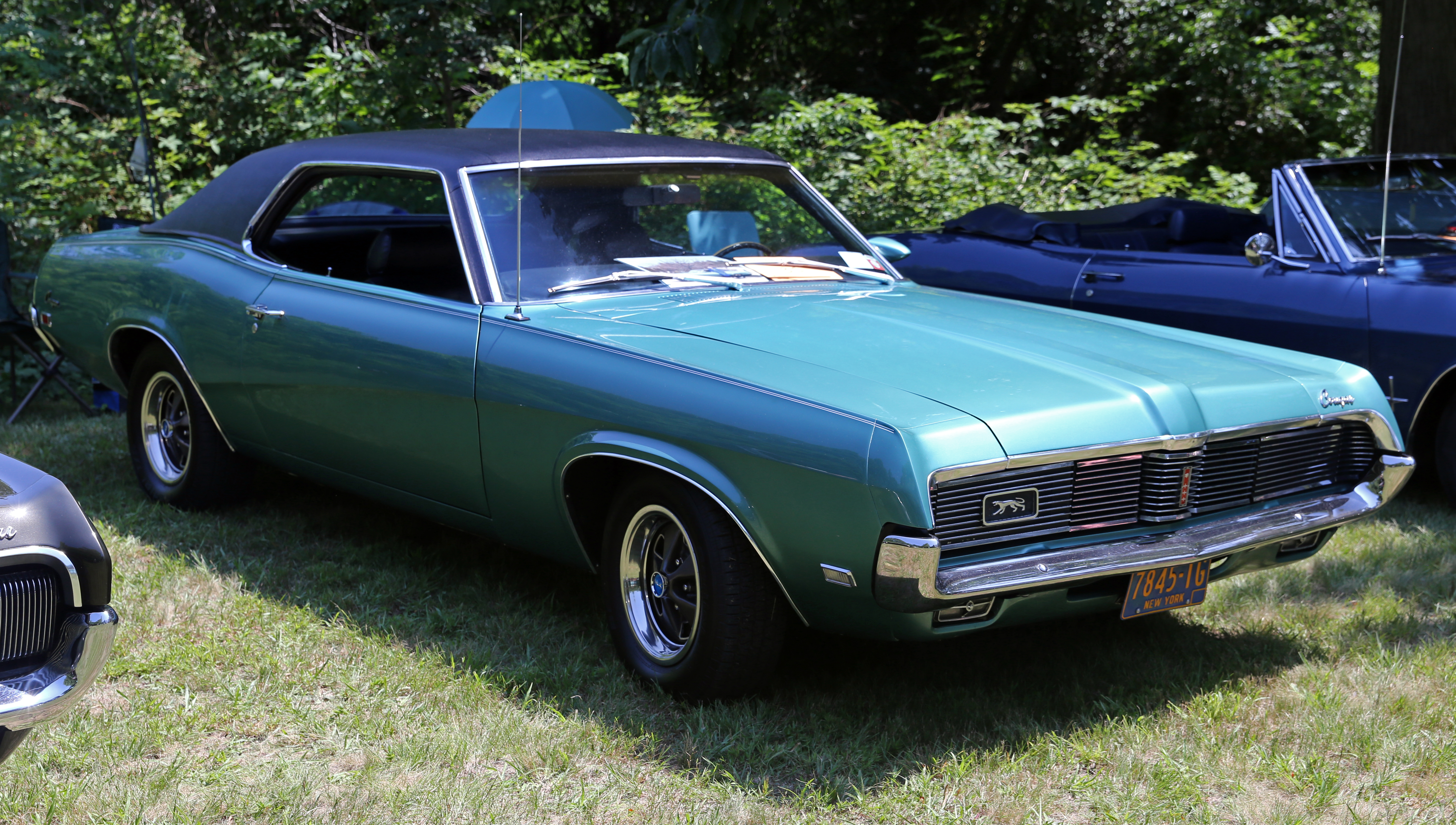
- 1969 Mercury Cougar (first generation)

Overview
- Manufacturer: Mercury (Ford)
- Model years: 1967–1997; 1999–2002

Body and chassis
- Class: Pony car (1967–1973); Personal luxury car (1974–1997); Mid-size cars (1977–1979, 1981–1982); Sport compact (1999–2002)
- Layout: Front-engine, rear-wheel drive (1967–1997); Transverse front-engine, front-wheel drive (1999–2002)

The Mercury Cougar is a series of automobiles that was sold by Mercury from 1967 to 2002. The model line is a diverse series of vehicles; though the Cougar nameplate is most commonly associated with two-door coupes, at various stages in its production, the model also was offered as a convertible and a hatchback. During its production as the mid-size Mercury line, the Cougar was also offered as a four-door sedan and five-door station wagon.

In production for 34 years across eight generations (skipping the 1998 model year), the Cougar is second only to the Grand Marquis (36 years) in the Mercury line for production longevity. 2,972,784 examples were produced, making it the highest-selling Mercury vehicle. During the 1970s and 1980s, the marketing of the Mercury division was closely associated with the Cougar, with promotional materials advertising Mercury dealers as "The Sign of the Cat" with big cats atop Lincoln-Mercury dealer signs. Cat-related nameplates were adopted by other Mercury lines, including the Bobcat and Lynx.

During its production, the Cougar was assembled at the Dearborn Assembly Plant (part of the Ford River Rouge Complex) in Dearborn, Michigan from 1967 until 1973, San Jose Assembly (Milpitas, California) from 1968 into early 1969, Lorain Assembly (Lorain, Ohio) from 1974 until 1997, and at Flat Rock Assembly (Flat Rock, Michigan) from 1999 through 2002.

== Overview ==
Mercury Cougar emblem (1970 Cougar Eliminator)

For nearly its entire production, the Cougar followed Mercury tradition, serving as a divisional counterpart of a Ford vehicle. Though sharing a common chassis architecture, the Cougar was visibly distinguished, ranging in degree from distinct grilles, badging, and lighting components to nearly every body panel specific to the model line.

For its first two generations, the Cougar was derived from the Ford Mustang. Initially serving as a pony car, the popularity of the Cougar led it to replace the Cyclone muscle car in the Mercury model line. The second generation moved its market position closer to the personal luxury car segment.

For its third and fourth generations, the Cougar adopted the Ford intermediate chassis. Slotted above the Montego, the model became the counterpart of the Ford (Gran Torino) Elite. For its fourth generation, Mercury split the Cougar into two model lines, with the Cougar replacing the Montego (matching the Ford LTD II), with the Cougar XR7 becoming the counterpart of the Ford Thunderbird (pairing the two models for 20 years).

For its fifth and sixth generations, the Cougar was downsized, adopting the Ford Fox chassis. Replacing the Mercury Monarch, the standard Cougar was the counterpart of the Ford Granada, with the larger Cougar XR7 designed alongside the Ford Thunderbird (sharing its chassis with the Lincoln Continental and Lincoln Mark VII). The sixth generation Cougar (adopting the lineage of the XR7) reverted the line solely to a two-door coupe.

The seventh-generation Cougar introduced the MN12 platform (alongside the Thunderbird). Though again a two-door personal luxury coupe, the model line underwent significant modernization.

After its discontinuation following the 1997 model year, an eighth-generation Cougar was introduced for 1999, with the nameplate returning as a sports compact hatchback. Originally intended for release as the third-generation Ford Probe, the nearly completed design was shifted to Mercury following the discontinuation of that model line. Sharing chassis underpinnings with the Ford Contour, the 1999 Cougar is the only generation offered with no divisional counterpart (though export vehicles were badged as the Ford Cougar).

== Development ==
The Mercury Cougar began life in the summer of 1962, as both Ford and Lincoln-Mercury styling teams submitted design proposals for the T-5 project (the 1965 Ford Mustang). Though the Ford design was selected for the vehicle, Lincoln-Mercury retained interest in the T-5 project, seeking to develop its own vehicle from it to compete in a similar market segment as the Ford Thunderbird (at the time, the latter model line outsold Lincoln by a wide margin). Until the spring of 1964, Ford remained skeptical of the sales potential of the T-5 project or committing to the expansion of the model line. Following the successful release of the Mustang, Ford approved the T-7 project, letting Lincoln-Mercury develop a model line from the planned 1967 update of the Mustang.

The T-7 took on the Cougar name, reviving the nameplate of the Ford T-5 proposal. Rather than serve as a direct counterpart of the Mustang (as the Pontiac Firebird did to the Chevrolet Camaro), the Mercury Cougar was intended to create its own market segment, combining attributes of both pony cars and personal luxury cars. Slotted between the Mustang and the Thunderbird, the Cougar offered more comfort and features than the Mustang, but was tuned for better road manners than the Thunderbird.

== First generation (1967–1970) ==
First generation
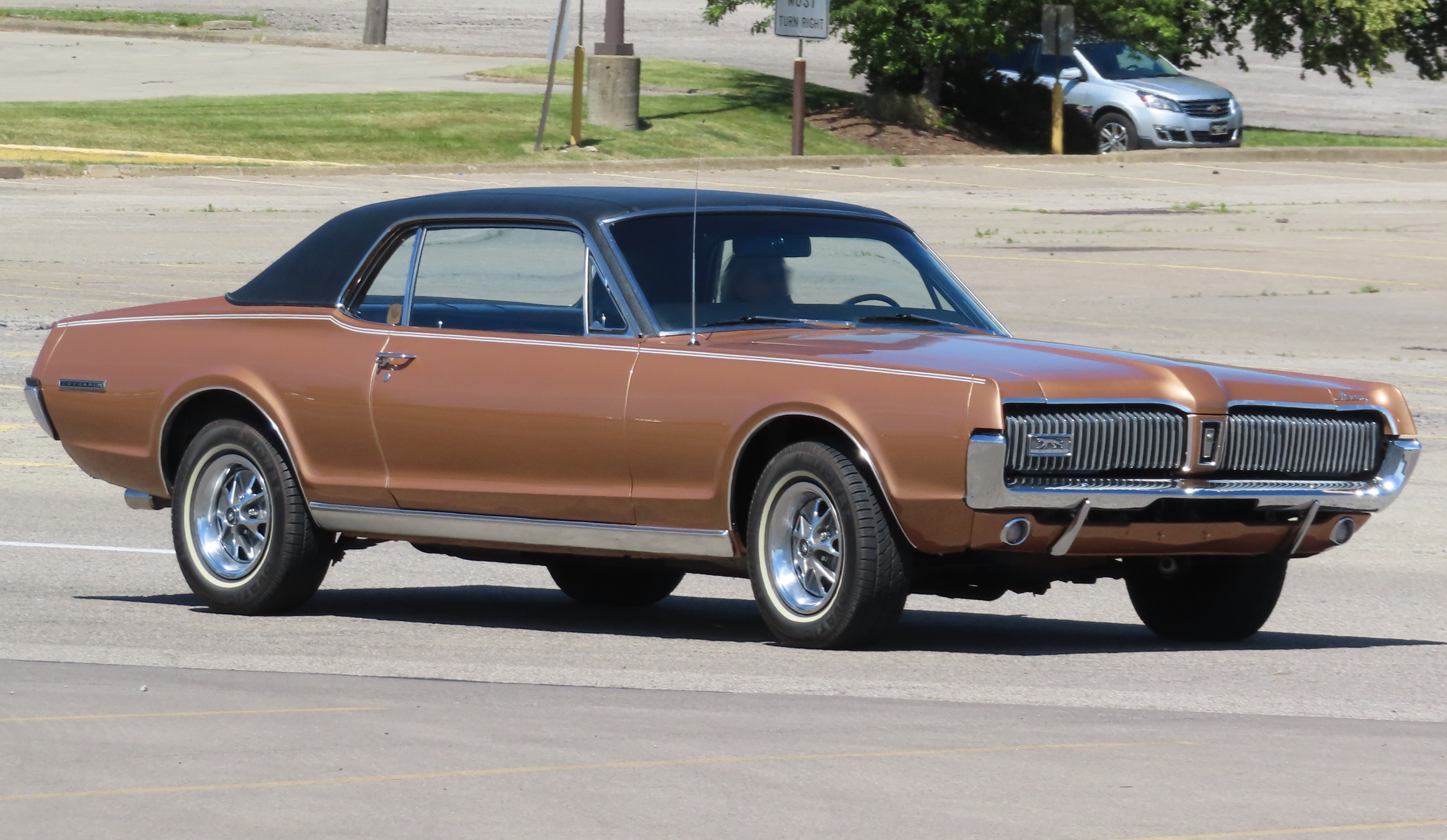
- 1967 Mercury Cougar

Overview
- Model years: 1967–1970
- Assembly: Dearborn, Michigan, United States; Edison, New Jersey, United States; Milpitas, California, United States

Body and chassis
- Body style: 2-door hardtop 2-door convertible (1969–1970)
- Layout: FR layout
- Related: Ford Mustang

Powertrain
- Engine: 289 cu in (4.7 L) Windsor V8; 302 cu in (4.9 L) Windsor V8; 351 cu in (5.8 L) Windsor V8; 351 cu in (5.8 L) Cleveland V8; 390 cu in (6.4 L) FE V8; 428 cu in (7.0 L) FE V8; 427 cu in (7.0 L) FE V8
- Transmission: 3-speed manual 4-speed manual 3-speed automatic

Dimensions
- Wheelbase: 111 in (2,819 mm)
- Length: 1967: 190.3 in (4834 mm); 1969: 193.8 in (4923 mm); 1970: 196.1 in (4941 mm)
- Width: 1967: 71.2 in (1808 mm); 1969: 75.0 in (1905 mm); 1970: 74.2 in (1885 mm)
- Height: 1967: 51.8 in (1316 mm); 1969: 51.9 in (1318 mm); 1970: 51.3 in (1303 mm)

The Mercury Cougar was released by Lincoln-Mercury on September 30, 1966. Far exceeding initial sales projections, the Cougar would account for nearly 40% of the 1967 sales of the entire Lincoln-Mercury division. In contrast to the Mustang, the Cougar was initially released solely as a two-door hardtop. Priced $284 more than the equivalent Ford Mustang, the base price of the Cougar was $2,854 ($28,320 in 2025 dollars); a fully optioned Cougar XR-7 was $4,500 ($44,654 in 2025 dollars), essentially matching the base price of the Ford Thunderbird.

The Cougar received the 1967 Motor Trend Car of the Year award, becoming the only Mercury-brand vehicle to do so.

=== Chassis ===
Internally designated T-7, the first-generation Cougar shared its chassis with the 1967 revision of the Ford Mustang. The Cougar has a longer wheelbase than the Mustang, extended 3 inches to 111 inches. Both vehicles derive their underpinnings from the rear-wheel drive Ford Falcon unibody compact chassis architecture.

==== Powertrain ====
The first-generation Cougar’s engine lineup was exclusively V8s. A 289 cu in (4.7 L) V8 was available with either a two-barrel 200 hp (149 kW; 203 PS) or a four-barrel carburetor 225 hp (168 kW; 228 PS) version; a 390 cu in (6.4 L) "Marauder" V8 was offered as an option, producing 320 hp (239 kW; 324 PS) (GT).

During 1968, the 289 was temporarily substituted with the 302 cu in (4.9 L) V8 designed for the new federal emissions standards. This engine was rated at 210 hp (157 kW; 213 PS) with a 2-barrel carburetor or 230 hp (172 kW; 233 PS) with four-barrel; with the former standard on the XR-7. At mid-year, a lower compression 289 was again available. A two-barrel "Marauder 390P" was introduced for non-GT Cougars, that was rated at 280 hp (209 kW; 284 PS). The newly introduced GT-E was introduced with a 427 cu in (7.0 L) V8, rated at 390 hp (291 kW; 395 PS). As a mid-year option, a 428 Cobra Jet Ram Air was introduced on April 1, 1968, rated at 335 hp (250 kW; 340 PS). The 428 Cobra Jet engine replaced the 427 in the GT-E.

For the 1969 model revision, the engine line underwent further changes. The 289 was dropped entirely; a two-barrel 351 cubic-inch "Windsor" V8 became the standard engine for the Cougar, producing 250 hp (2-bbl) and 290 hp (4-bbl). The 390 was offered solely as a 320 hp four-barrel. The 428 Cobra Jet was the largest Cougar engine, rated at 335 hp (with or without Ram Air).

As a mid-year change, Mercury introduced the Boss 302 V8 on April 1, 1969, in conjunction with the introduction of the Cougar Eliminator (with the Boss 302 engine being exclusive to the Eliminator). A four-barrel "street" version of the Boss 302 produced 290 hp, while a 2x4-barrel "racing" version was rated at the same 290 hp (216 kW; 294 PS). While sales material showed the Boss 429 as an optional engine for the Cougar Eliminator, the Cougar was never offered to the public with the Boss 429 engine; two Boss 429 standard hardtop Cougars were produced as factory drag cars for "Fast Eddie" Schartman and "Dyno Don" Nicholson.

For 1970, the two-barrel 351 remained the base engine, with the four-barrel engine replaced by a 351 cubic-inch "Cleveland" V8, rated at 300 hp (224 kW; 304 PS). While unchanged in displacement, this engine was an all-new design. The 390 was dropped, with the 428 Cobra Jet remaining alongside the Boss 302 as the high-performance engine options.

=== 1967–1968 ===
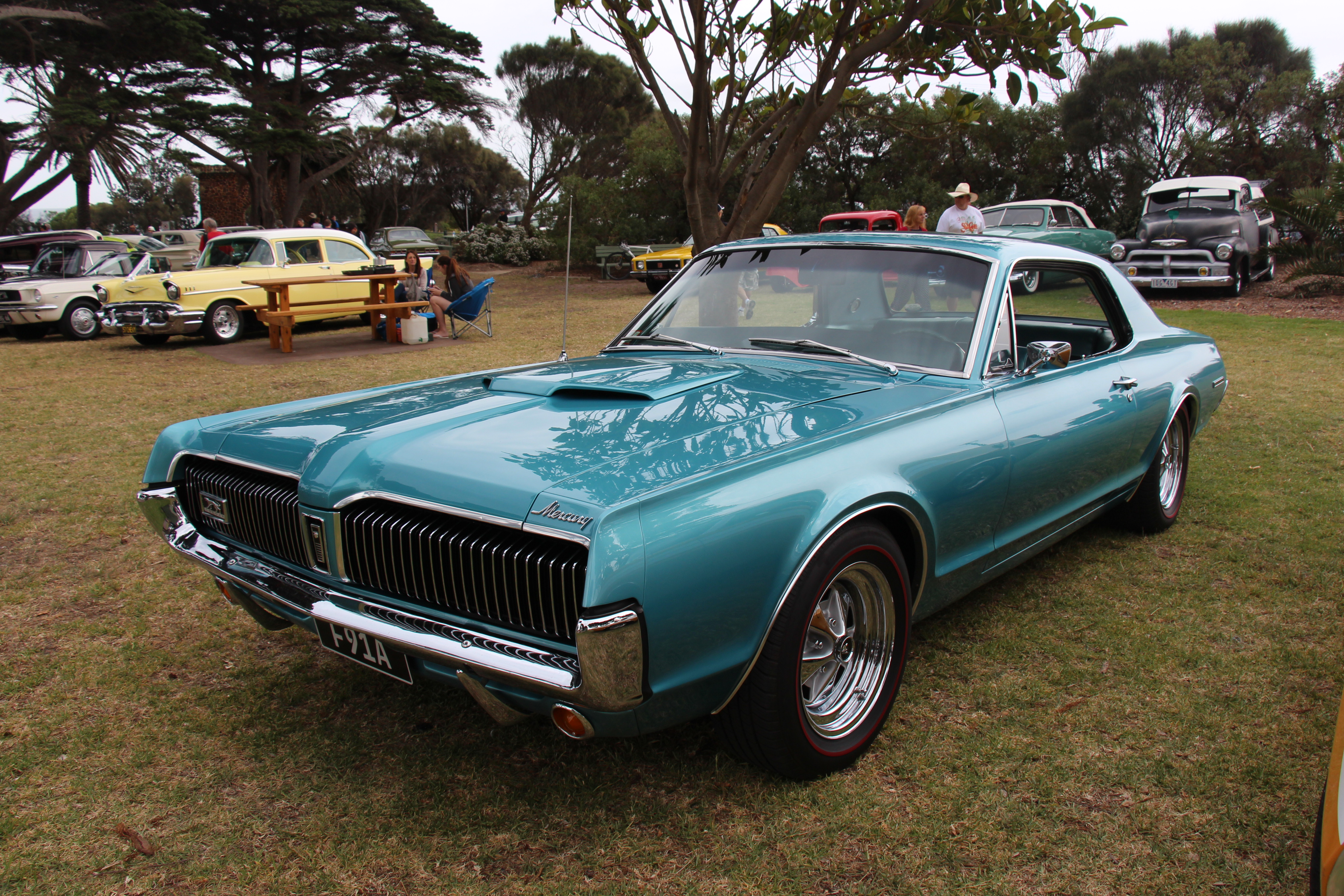
1967 Mercury Cougar GT

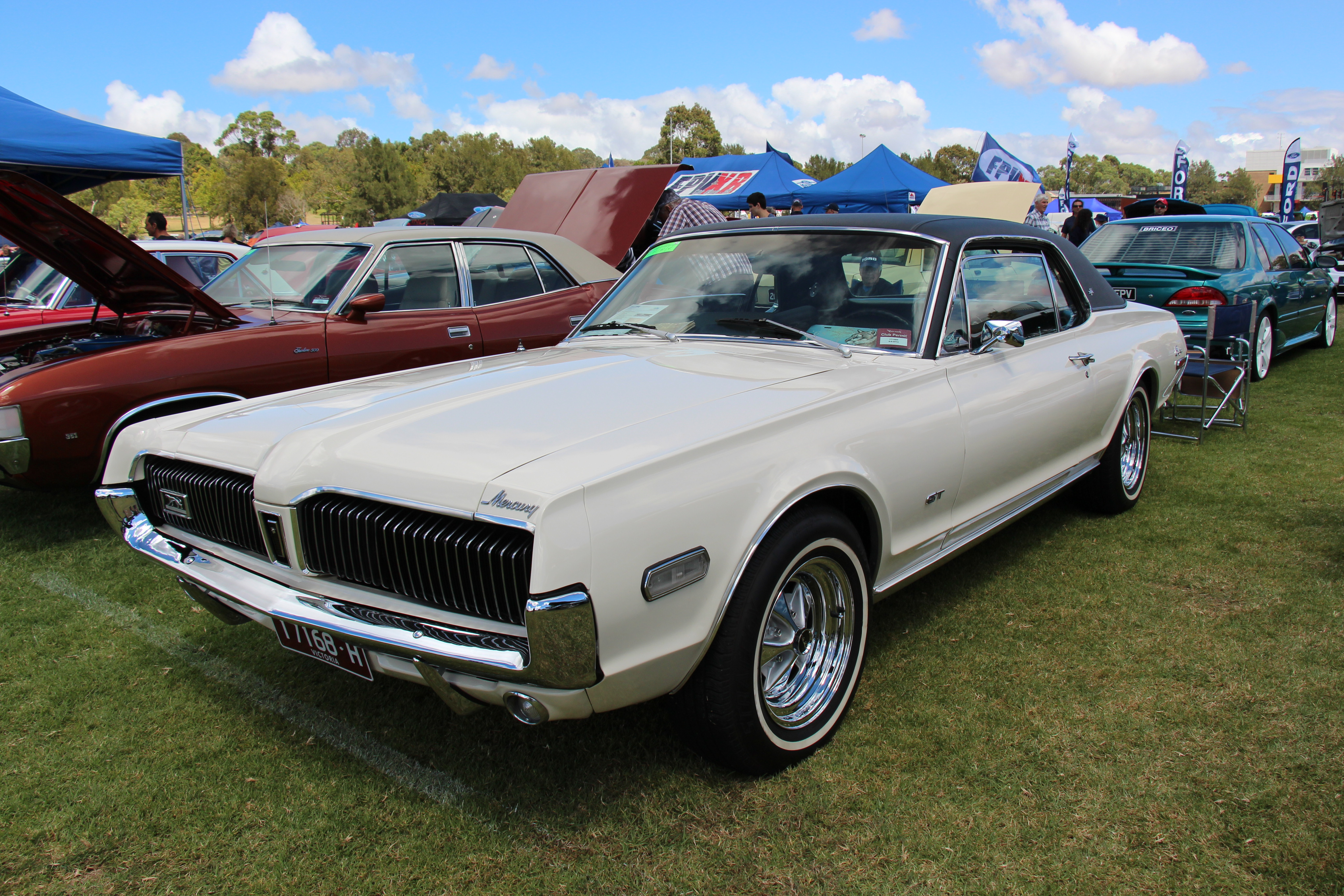
1968 Mercury Cougar XR-7 GT

The 1967 Cougar featured a unique body design while continuing the popular "long-hood, short-deck" proportions of the Mustang. The model line was marketed as having "European" style and features. The first Lincoln-Mercury vehicle with hidden headlamps, Cougar headlight doors were powered by dual vacuum actuators (one for each headlight door), with vacuum provided by the engine and stored in a reservoir under the fender. The front fascia was distinguished by a split "electric shaver" grille, featuring vertically slatted chrome trim. The rear fascia was styled similarly, concealing dark-lens taillamps behind vertically slatted trim; sequential turn signals were standard (adopting the mechanism from the Thunderbird).

The $185 upgrade to the XR-7 brought further European influence, including a (simulated) wood-trim dashboard, full instrumentation (black-face gauges), toggle switches, and an overhead console; if so equipped, the automatic transmission was fitted with a T-handle console shifter. The Cougar was offered with nearly every Mercury option (including speed control), with the sole exception of power windows. A "Tilt-Away" steering wheel was also offered, being a power-operated steering column that swung up and out of the way when the driver's door was opened, the transmission in "park", and the ignition was off.

For 1968, the Cougar included federal safety enhancements that added side marker lights and front outboard shoulder belts (sash belt, shoulder harness). In a first for Ford Motor Company, the 1968 Cougar offered an electrically operated sunroof as an option. The Bosch-sourced sunroof assemblies were installed by the American Sunroof Corporation in Southgate, Michigan. While available on any Cougar, the sunroof was not a popular option.

=== 1969–1970 ===
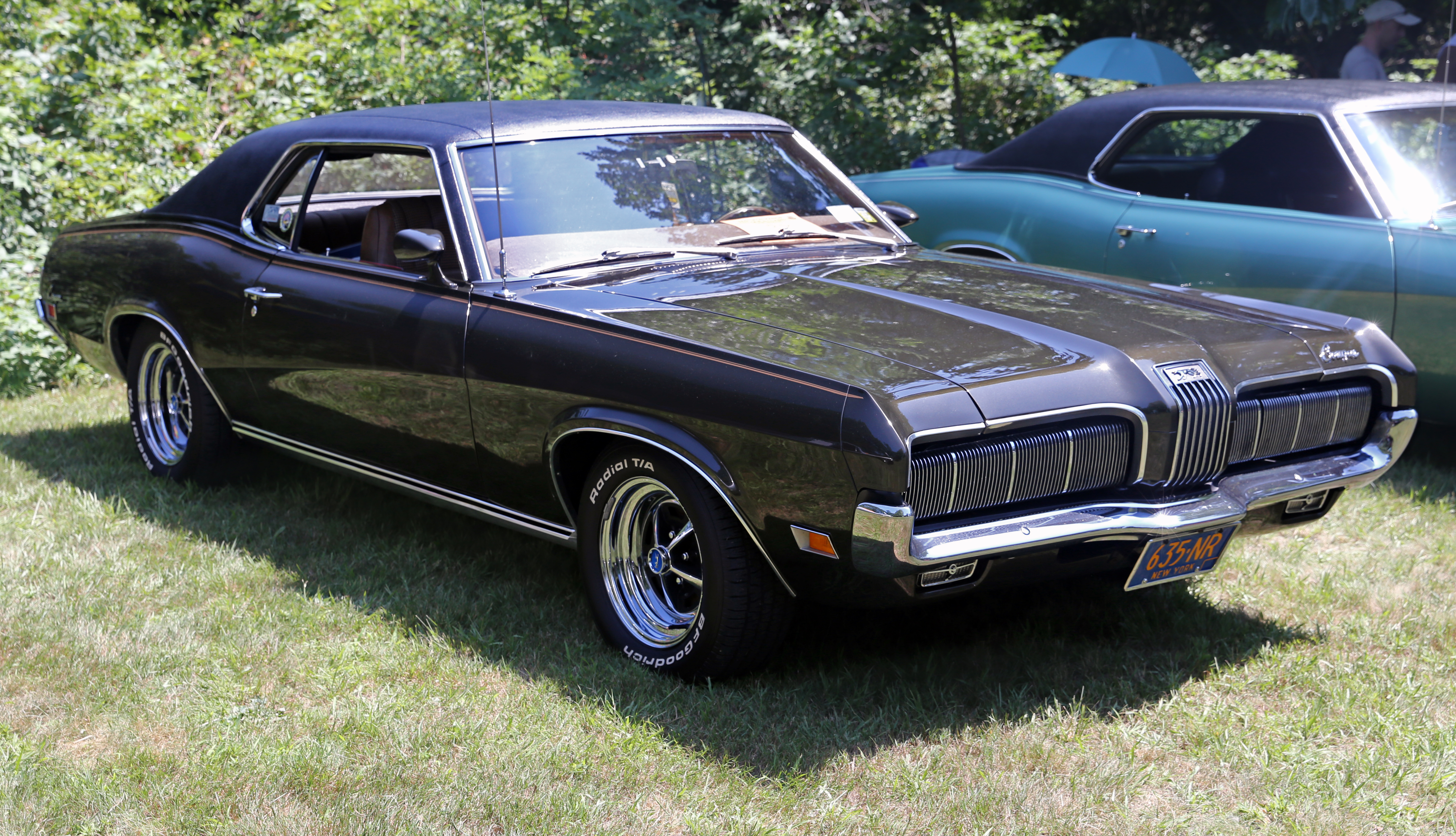
1970 Mercury Cougar

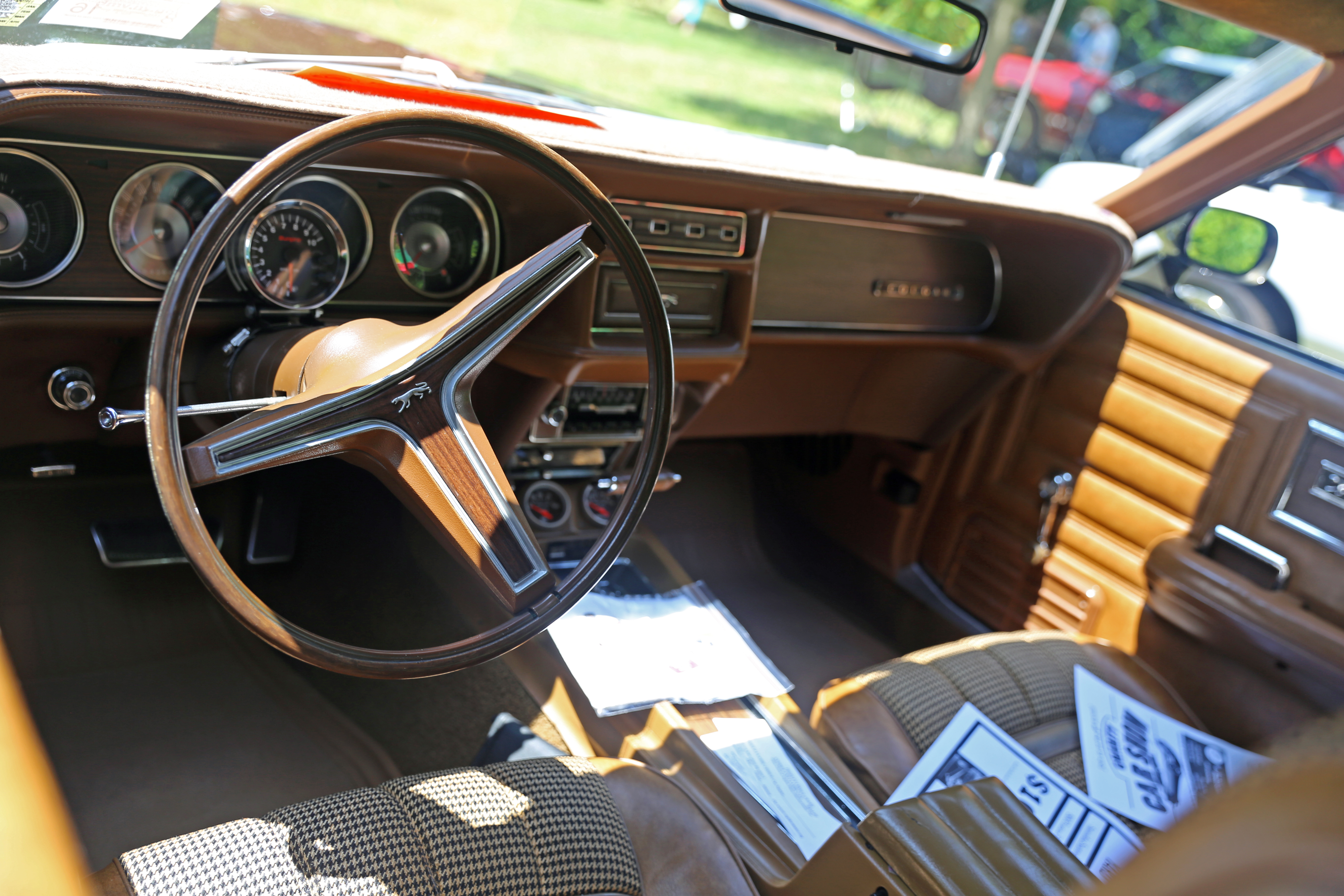
1970 Mercury Cougar interior

For the 1969 model year, the Cougar underwent a mid-cycle revision alongside its Mustang counterpart. The straight-lined body sides transitioned toward Coke bottle styling, distinguished by a sweeping body crease sloping down from the hood line to the rear wheels; while the roofline saw little change to its design, the vent windows were deleted. The front fascia retained a full-width grille, with the "electric shaver" split grille replaced by a horizontally slatted grille (with a matching centerpiece); concave taillamp lenses replaced the previous convex design. The hidden headlamps were retained; the mechanism shifted its power from dual vacuum actuators to a single, centrally located vacuum actuator. The vacuum to operate the headlight doors was provided by the engine and stored in a reservoir under the fender. The headlight doors use spiral torsion springs to stay open.

A convertible body style was added to the model line, available in both standard and XR-7 trims; a power-operated top was standard.

For 1970, the Cougar underwent an additional revision to the front fascia; the split "electric shaver" grille with vertically slatted trim made its return, with a new hood adopting a pronounced body-color center section. As part of the front fascia revision, the Cougar also received a new front bumper and revised front fenders. Concave taillamp lenses remained but with revised trim bezels, in addition to revised side marker lights. A change to the position of the rear axle necessitated a new rocker panel length and rear quarter sheet metal as compared to the 1969 model, although these changes are not visually apparent.

Cougar also received a special option package (styled by fashion designer Pauline Trigère), including a houndstooth-patterned vinyl roof and matching upholstery; the roof and upholstery were available together or separately, in either brown-and-black houndstooth or white-and-black houndstooth check patterns. Further safety upgrades included the addition of locking steering columns and high-backed bucket seats (replacing adjustable head restraints).

=== Trims ===
The first-generation Cougar was offered in two trims, an unnamed Standard trim, and the XR-7 trim (introduced in early 1967).

==== Cougar GT (1967–1968) ====
Available for both the standard Cougar and Cougar XR-7, the GT option package was developed as a sportier version of the Cougar. Standard was the a 390 cubic-inch "Marauder GT" V8 (320 hp) as well as upgraded suspension, larger brakes, wheels, and tires, and a low-restriction exhaust system.

For 1967 and 1968, to commemorate the success of the model line in competition, Mercury offered the Dan Gurney Special appearance option, available on both the Standard and XR-7 models. In addition to a signature decal, the option package included turbine-style wheel covers and a chrome engine dress-up kit.

To signify his association with Lincoln-Mercury, the XR7-G (G=Gurney) was introduced as an option for 1968. Largely a performance-oriented appearance package, the XR-7G project was assigned to Shelby Automotive, with the conversions performed at the A.O. Smith facility. Modifications included unique hood scoop, hood pins, fog lamps, tailpipe tips, special badging and wheels, and unique interior trim components. The option package was offered with any Cougar engine. A total of 619 Cougars were built with the XR7-G package.

For 1968, the GT-E was introduced above the Cougar GT. Offering a racing-derived 390 hp 427 V8 (paired solely with a 3-speed automatic), the GT-E included special badging, quad exhaust, argent lower body paint delineated by chrome trim, and a redesigned grille; power front disc brakes were standard. As a running change in April 1968, the 427 engine was replaced by a 428 Cobra Jet as an option, the latter was officially rated at 335 hp. A total of 394 GT-Es were manufactured; of which 357 were equipped with the 427 and 37 were built with the 428CJ. With the change to the 428CJ engine for the GT-E, the 4-speed manual transmission was also made available for the GT-E package.

==== Cougar Eliminator (1969–1970) ====
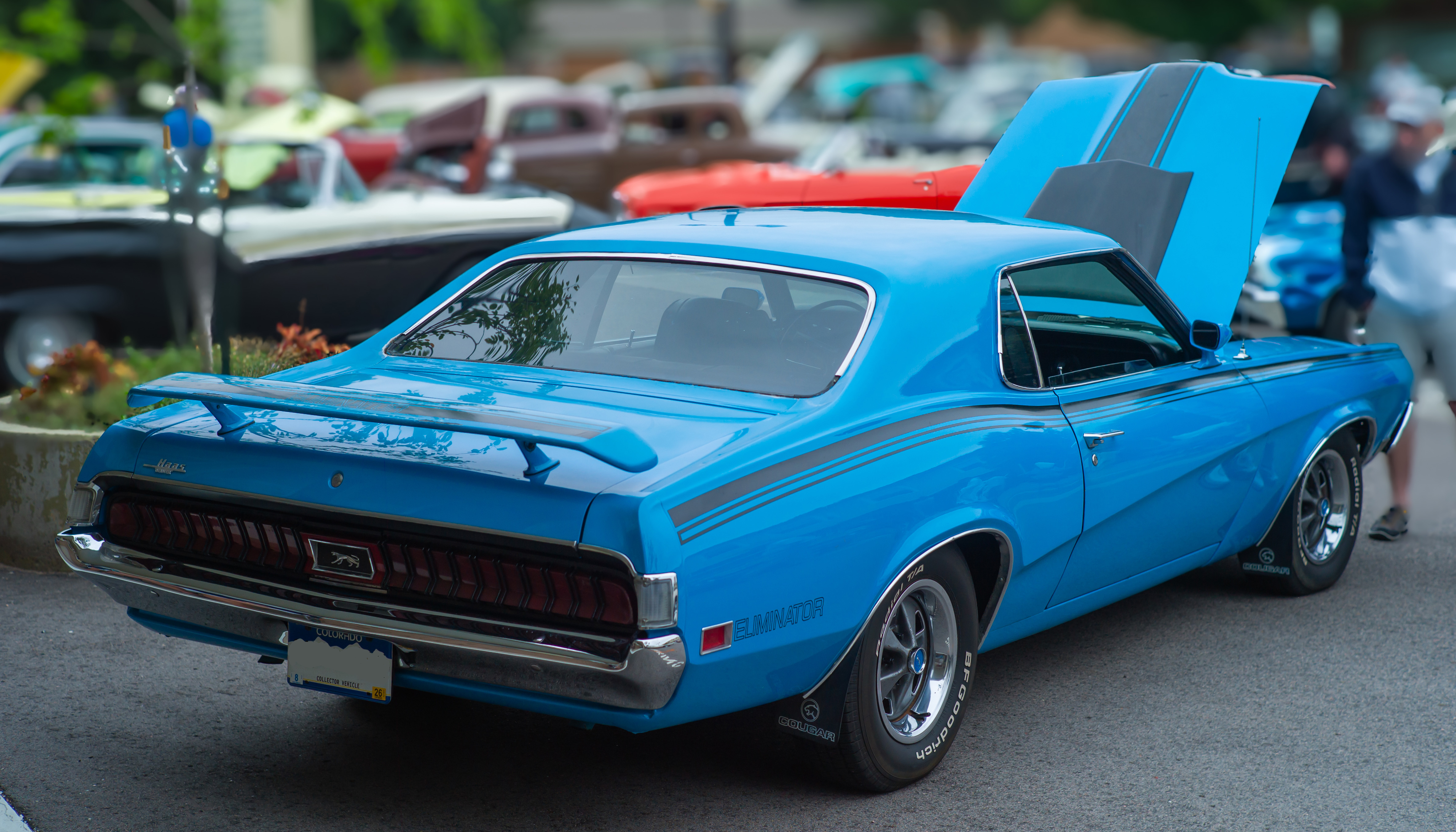
1970 Mercury Cougar Eliminator in Competition Blue

As a running change during 1969, the Eliminator was introduced in conjunction with the Boss 302 Mustang as Mercury's showcase for the Boss 302 engine. Largely a counterpart of the Ford Mustang Mach 1 and Ford Boss 302 Mustang, the Cougar Eliminator replaced the Cougar GT as the performance-trim Cougar on April 1, 1969. Offered solely as a standard Cougar hardtop (not available as convertible nor XR-7), the Eliminator was offered with all available Cougar engines, with the 351-4V as the standard engine (Windsor in 1969 and Cleveland in 1970) and the Boss 302 engine exclusive to the Eliminator.

For 1969, the Eliminator Option consisted of: the Eliminator Equipment Package, the Eliminator Decor Group, and the Performance Tire / Handling Group. These included the 351W-4V engine, a front air dam and body-colored rear spoiler, styled steel wheels (similar to the 1969 Mach 1 wheels), a black-out front grille, body-colored hood scoop (only functional with ram-air 428CJ engine), Eliminator-specific body side stripes in white or black (keyed to paint and trim color), left-hand remote-control racing-style side mirror, heavy-duty suspension, and a performance axle. Interior upgrades included: Hi-Back bucket seats (Eliminator-only for 1969 model year), and unique "black camera case" instrument panels with full instrumentation (including visual warning lights and gauges, tachometer, trip odometer, and rallye clock). Four exterior colors were available: white, bright blue metallic, competition orange, and bright yellow. Optional engines included: 390-4V, 428 Cobra Jet or Super Cobra Jet (both available with or without Ram-Air), and Boss 302 (available only with the Eliminator Option). There were 2,250 Eliminators built for 1969.

For 1970, the standard engine for Eliminator became the 351C-4V. The Eliminator Option blacked-out exterior trim expanded from the front grille to include the hood scoop and tail light bezels. A Cougar "running cat" badge replaced the Mercury crest emblem on the fuel door, and a passenger-side racing-style mirror was added. The body side stripes (available in black only) were altered to run the length of the car along the upper belt line and now included a hood stripe, rear spoiler stripe with "Eliminator" callout, and "Eliminator" callouts on the quarters behind the rear wheel. Exterior paint colors available for the 1970 Eliminator mimicked the "Grabber" colors in the Ford lineup and included: Competition Orange, Competition Yellow, Competition Blue, Competition Gold, Competition Green, and Pastel Blue. The Special Paint Order option was also available for Eliminators in 1970, producing single-digit examples in colors such as Black, Light Gray Metallic, White, and Red. Optional engines included: 428 Cobra Jet or Super Cobra Jet (both available with or without Ram-Air), and Boss 302 (available only with the Eliminator Option). There were 2,268 Eliminators built for 1970.

==== Special editions ====
The Cougar Sports Special package was offered only in 1969, and was only available on the Standard hardtop model Cougar. There were four levels to the Sport Special package, with each adding additional features. Package A included: unique pinstriping, "turbine" style wheel covers, rocker panel moldings with simulated side scoops, and a remote-control racing-style side mirror. Package B included the Package A items, as well as adding the interior Decor Group option, which featured upgraded seating surfaces and interior trim panels with door-mounted courtesy lights, and a "rim-blow" steering wheel. Package C included the Package A items, as well as the Special Handling Package, featuring improved tires and heavy-duty suspension components. Package D combined all other packages: Package A, the Interior Decor package, and the Special Handling package. The Sports Special could be combined with any available engine.

For 1969 and 1970, the Hertz Rental Car Company purchased Cougar Eliminators as part of their "Rent-A-Racer" program. These Eliminators were ordered with the electric sunroof option, which was not available on Eliminators sold to the public. All of the Hertz Eliminators were equipped with the 351-4V engine and FMX automatic transmission. They were also identically optioned, except for paint and interior trim colors, and the California Evaporative Emissions equipment required for the 1970 models sent to California. There were 101 Hertz Eliminators built in 1969, and 100 Hertz Eliminators built in 1970.

=== Production ===
Model year	Units
1967	150,893
1968	113,720
1969	100,069
1970	72,343

== Second generation (1971–1973) ==
Second generation
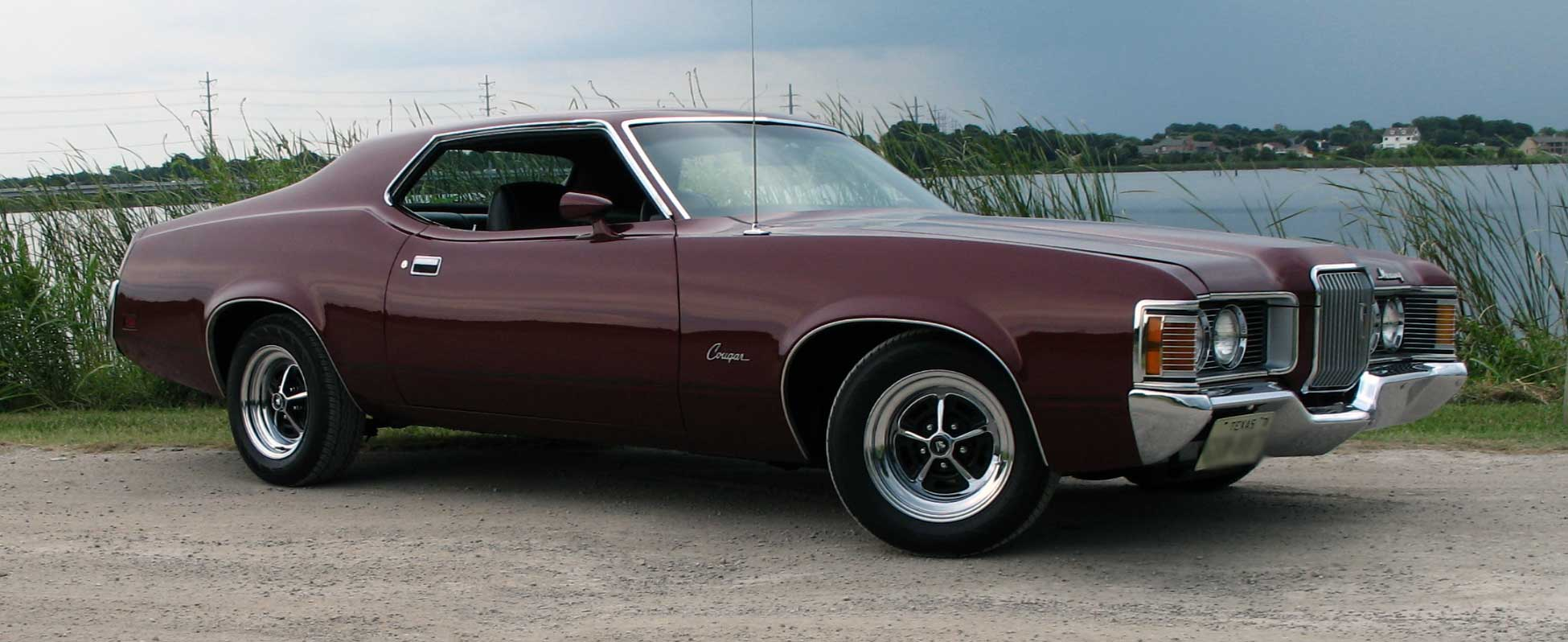
- 1971 Mercury Cougar

Overview
- Model years: 1971–1973
- Assembly: Dearborn, Michigan, United States

Body and chassis
- Body style: 2-door hardtop 2-door convertible
- Layout: FR layout
- Related: Ford Mustang

Powertrain
- Engine: 351 cu in (5.8 L) Windsor V8; 351 cu in (5.8 L) Cleveland V8; 429 cu in (7.0 L) Super Cobra Jet V8
- Transmission: 3-speed manual 4-speed manual 3-speed automatic

Dimensions
- Wheelbase: 112.1 in (2,847 mm)
- Length: 196.7 in (4,996 mm); 199.5 in (5,067 mm) (1973)
- Width: 75.8 in (1,925 mm)
- Height: 50.8 in (1,290 mm)

For the 1971 model year, Lincoln-Mercury released the second-generation Mercury Cougar. To expand potential competition for the model line, Ford benchmarked the design of the Cougar against the quartet of GM A-body coupes, placing the model line in competition with the Oldsmobile Cutlass Supreme. Again sharing much of its bodyshell with the Ford Mustang, the Cougar began to shift away from a "plush pony car", taking on aspects of both sporty cars and luxury cars.

The continued success of the Cougar led to several changes within the Mercury model line. Largely overshadowed by the Cougar, the intermediate-size Mercury Cyclone was integrated into the Montego line and was quietly retired during the 1972 model year. To give the division a compact sporty car, Ford began sales of the imported Capri through the Lincoln-Mercury network; manufactured in West Germany by Ford of Europe, the Capri (not officially badged as a Mercury) was sized slightly smaller than the 1965 Mustang.

This generation of the Cougar is the final version derived from the Ford Mustang and is also the final version offered as a convertible. During the early 1970s, American manufacturers ended assembly of convertibles in anticipation of increased rollover safety standards. Following the retirement of the Montego and Marquis convertibles, the Cougar became the final Mercury model line offered with the design for the 1973 model year; a light blue/white 1973 Cougar XR-7 was the last convertible assembled by Ford Motor Company (for over a decade).

=== Chassis ===
The second-generation Cougar used a revised version of the first-generation chassis, again sharing the Ford Falcon unibody architecture with the Ford Mustang; the wheelbase was increased to 112.1 inches. To better accommodate big-block V8 engines (as the 385-series 429 V8 was replacing the FE-series 428 V8), the front track width was increased from 58.1 to 61.5 inches (only an inch narrower than the Panther-chassis Grand Marquis).

The model line was fitted with front disc and rear drum brakes, with power-assisted brakes becoming standard in 1973. The same year, the 3-speed manual transmission was dropped, with an automatic becoming standard; a 4-speed manual was offered as an option on 351 Cobra Jet V8s. All four-speed manual cars and 4-barrel 351 cars included factory dual exhaust and staggered rear shocks.

==== Powertrain ====
As with the previous generation, the 1971–1973 Cougar received a standard V8 engine (in contrast to the Mustang). In a revision of the powertrain line, the Cougar dropped the two-barrel 351 Windsor V8, the Boss 302, and the 428 Cobra Jet V8s. A 351 Cleveland V8 was the standard engine in two-barrel configuration (240 hp) or as an optional four-barrel design (285 hp). Replacing the Boss engines and the 428 Cobra Jet V8s, a 370 hp 429 Cobra Jet (with or without Ram Air) was the highest-performance engine option.

For 1972, Ford adopted SAE net horsepower ratings, leading to a numerical decrease in advertised engine output. The 429 V8 was dropped, leaving the Cougar with three versions of the 351C V8. A 166 hp (124 kW), two-barrel version was the standard engine, with an optional 262 hp (195 kW) four-barrel Cobra-Jet 351 V8 (designated by a "Q" as the fifth character in the VIN). There was also an optional Cobra-Jet Performance Package which included a performance exhaust, thicker front sway bar, rear sway bar, and an upgraded 10.25-inch 2800 stall torque converter (if equipped with an automatic transmission; all 4-speed cars came standard with this package), which produces 266 hp (198 kW). For 1973, the Cobra-Jet Performance Package was made standard on all four-barrel engines, leaving the two-barrel 351C (retuned to 168 hp) and the 264 hp 351CJ V8.

=== Body design ===
The second-generation Cougar carried over both the hardtop and convertible body styles from its predecessor. Sharing its roofline with the Mustang hardtop, the Cougar received a large "flying buttress" C-pillars, extending into the rear fenders. To distinguish the model line from the Mustang, the Cougar adopted multiple design elements from larger Mercury vehicles. In place of the inset rectangular grille of the Mustang, the front fascia was styled with a prominent radiator-style grille flanked by four headlights (now exposed). The taillights adapted simpler trim, set horizontally within the bumper (in line with full-size Mercury vehicles).

For 1972, the Cougar underwent few substantial changes to the interior or exterior. For 1973, the front fascia underwent an update to include a federally required 5-mph bumper to improve crashworthiness; the new design added three inches to the overall length. Larger and straighter than before, the new bumper required a redesign of the grille (no longer extending into the bumper line). As the model line was in its final year, the rear bumper was largely unchanged, receiving only minor revisions to the taillamp lenses (a 5 mph rear bumper was not required until 1974).

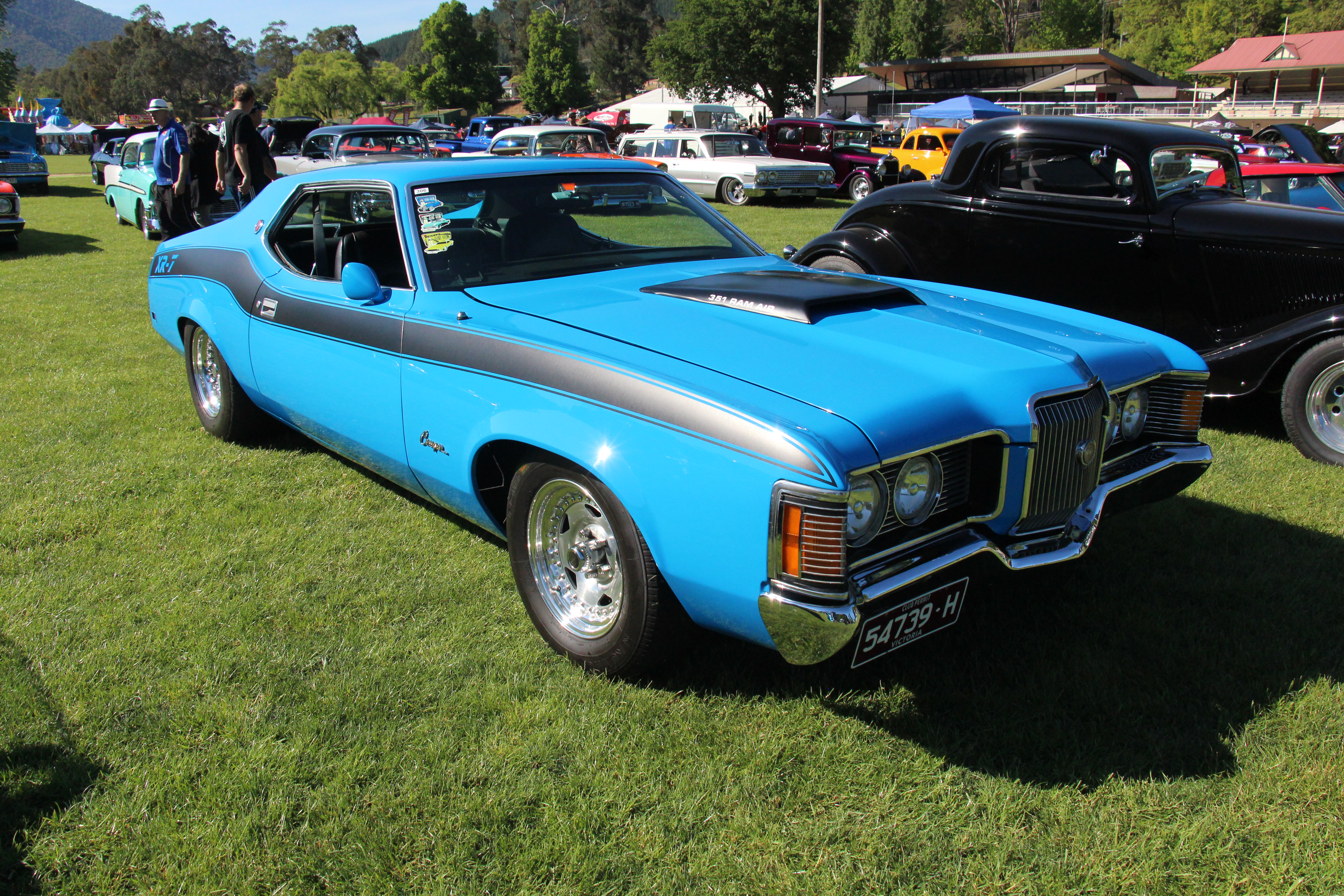
1971 Cougar XR-7 (351 Ram Air)

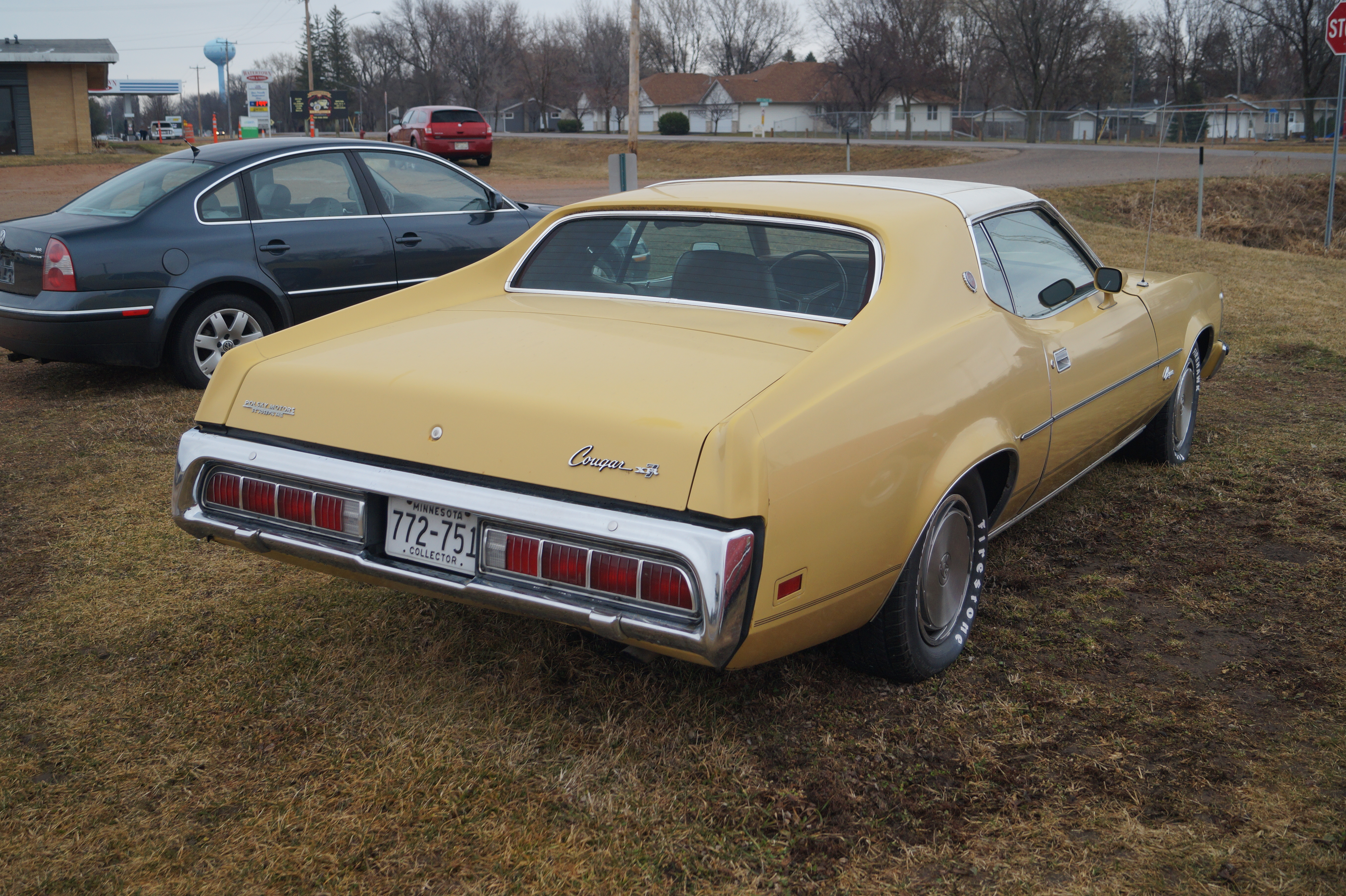
1973 Cougar XR-7 hardtop roofline, showing "flying buttresses"

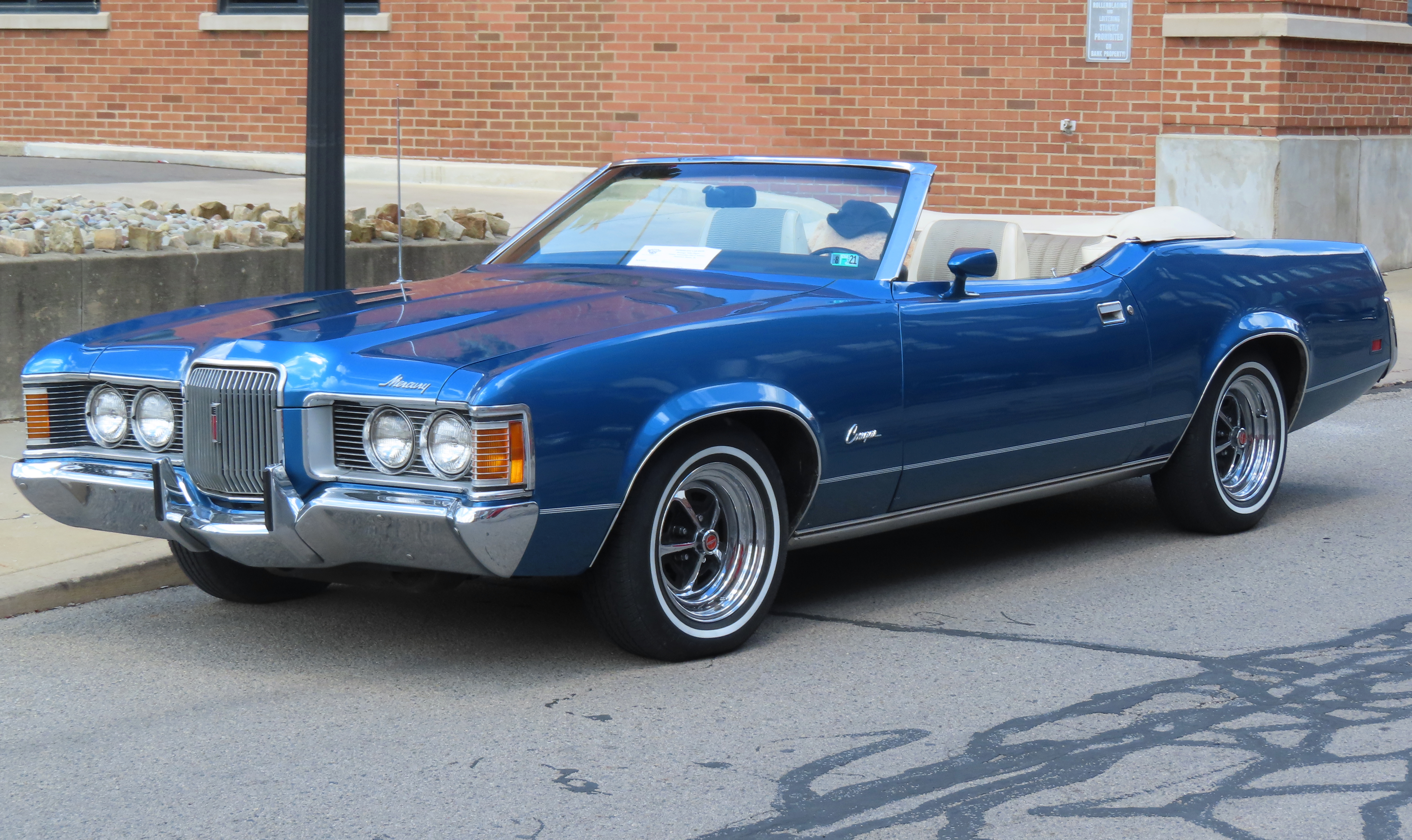
1972 Cougar convertible

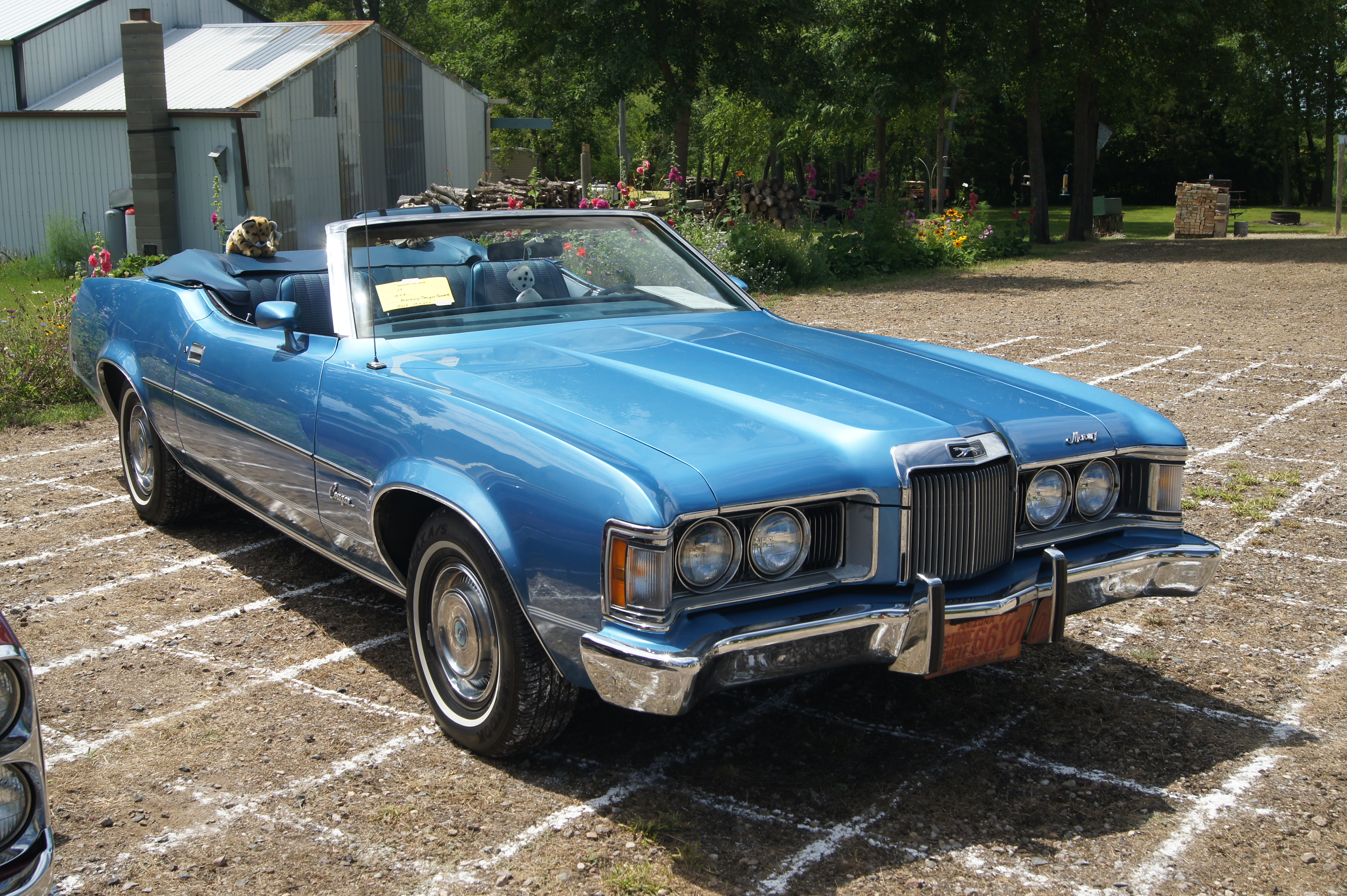
1973 Cougar convertible

=== Trim ===
For 1971, the Cougar was offered in standard and XR-7 trim. As its Boss Mustang counterpart was dropped, Mercury discontinued the racing-oriented Cougar Eliminator. While de-emphasized as the model line shifted away from high performance, the GT option package remained an option, including upgraded suspension, tires, and engine cooling components. For 1973, the GT option was discontinued.

While both trims shared the same powertrain offerings, the XR-7 received its own exterior and interior design, distinguished by a vinyl top (on hardtops); along with standardizing many options, the XR-7 received its own door panels and dashboard.

For 1973, Lincoln-Mercury marketed a "Bronze Age" special edition promotion of the Cougar (alongside the Monterey, Montego MX, and Comet). A standard Cougar equipped with the Decor Group, the "Bronze Age" Cougar was distinguished by its copper metallic (officially, saddle bronze) appearance and a color-coordinated vinyl roof. Alongside its namesake color, the trim package was also offered in six other colors: ivy glamour metallic, green metallic, medium brown metallic, saddle bronze, medium yellow gold, and white.

=== Production ===
Model year	Units
1971	62,864
1972	53,702
1973	60,628

== Third generation (1974–1976) ==
Third generation
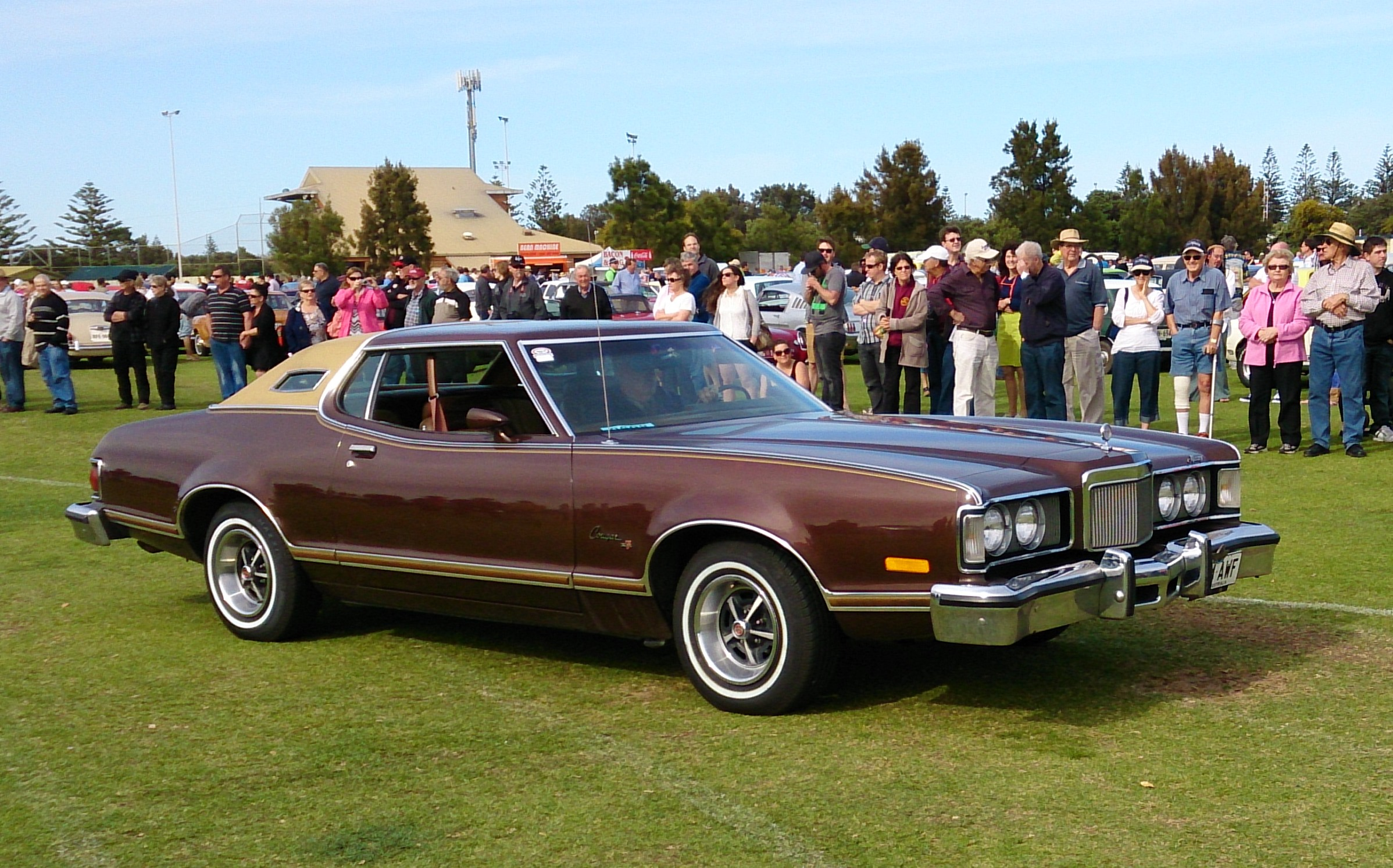
- 1974–1976 Mercury Cougar XR-7 2-Door Hardtop

Overview
- Model years: 1974–1976
- Assembly: United States: Atlanta Georgia (Atlanta Assembly)

Body and chassis
- Body style: 2-door hardtop
- Layout: FR layout
- Related: Ford Torino; Ford Elite; Mercury Montego

Powertrain
- Engine: 351 cu in (5.8 L) 351 Cleveland V8; 351 cu in (5.8 L) Q-code/351CJ V8; 351 cu in (5.8 L) 351M V8; 400 cu in (6.6 L) 400 V8; 460 cu in (7.5 L) 385/Lima V8
- Transmission: 3-speed automatic

Dimensions
- Wheelbase: 114.0 in (2,896 mm)
- Length: 215.5 in (5,474 mm)
- Width: 78.5 in (1,994 mm)

For 1974, Lincoln-Mercury released the third-generation Mercury Cougar, introducing both design and marketing changes to the model line. One of the few American model lines that would eschew downsizing during the mid-1970s, the Cougar grew in size, sharing its body with the Mercury Montego and the later introduced Ford (Gran Torino) Elite. Splitting from the Mustang (which became the subcompact Mustang II for 1974), the Cougar adopted a market position closer to the larger Ford Thunderbird. In a model consolidation, all third-generation Cougars were offered under a single XR-7 trim level, as the GT and Eliminator editions were retired.

Initially, at risk for cancellation (following declining sales of the second generation compared to its competitors), Lincoln-Mercury instead repackaged the Cougar as a halo car for the Mercury brand. As division executives sought to avoid overlap with the successful Capri (sold since 1971), the Cougar grew in size to remain a competitor to the Oldsmobile Cutlass Supreme and Buick Regal, finding newfound competitors from the release the AMC Matador Coupe and the Chrysler Cordoba.

The redesign proved successful in the market; while still a decline over the first generation, the third generation increased sales by nearly 50% over its 1971–1973 predecessor.

=== Chassis ===
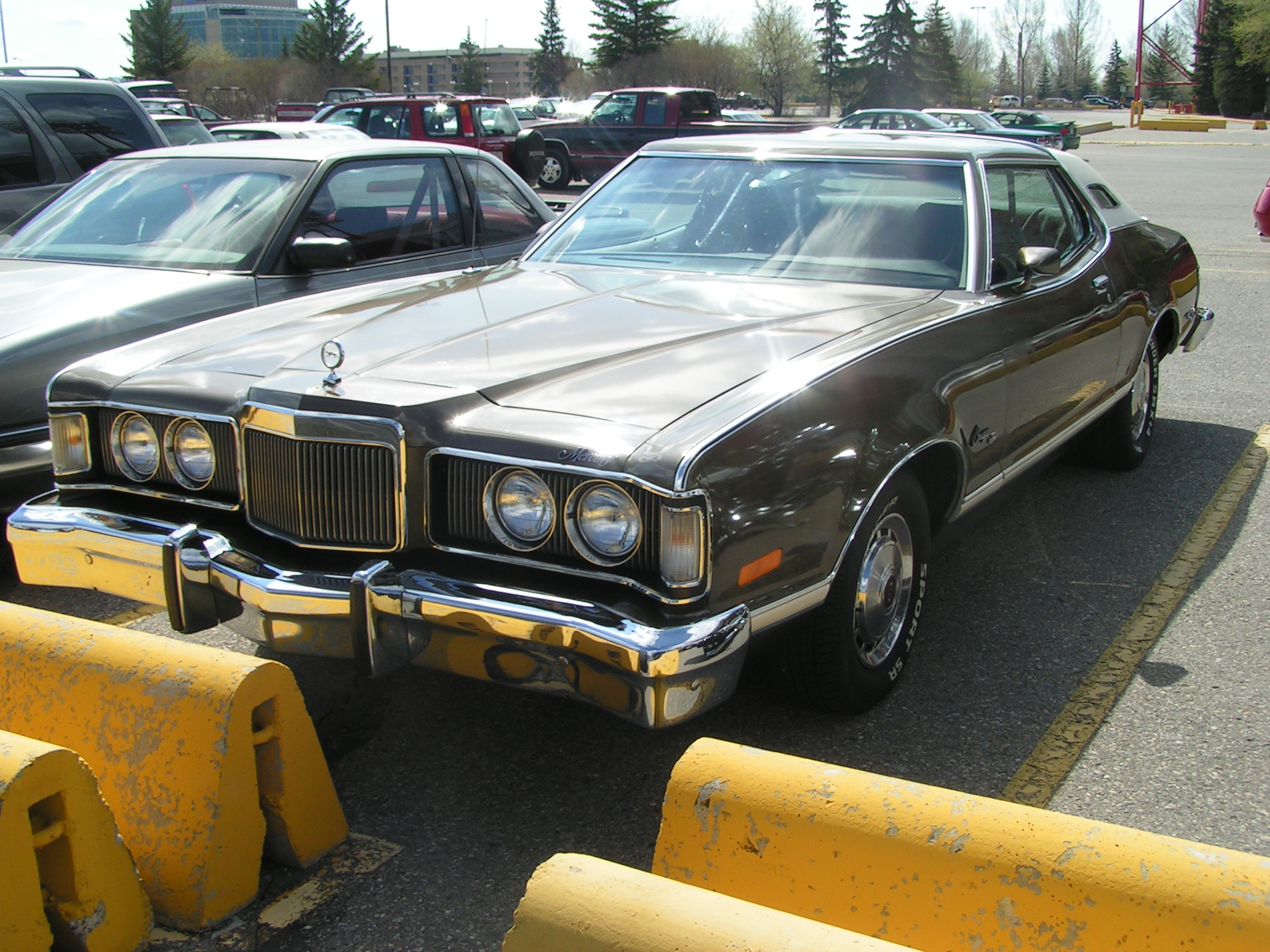
1974 Mercury Cougar XR-7

The third-generation Cougar uses the rear-wheel drive chassis used by the Mercury Montego and Ford Torino intermediates. Moving to a 114-inch wheelbase (used by the two-door Montego/Torino and the Elite), the third-generation Cougar was the first to share its wheelbase with another model line. As part of adopting the Torino chassis, the Cougar shifted to body-on-frame construction for the first time.

==== Powertrain details ====
For 1974, four engines were offered for the Cougar. Two 351 cubic-inch V8s were carried over from the previous Cougar, including the standard 351 Cleveland and optional 351CJ "Cobra Jet" V8s. From the full-size Mercury line, the Cougar also offered a 400 cubic-inch V8 and 460 cubic-inch V8 as options. For the first time, the model line was offered solely with automatic transmissions.

For 1975, the Cougar saw revisions to its engine range. The 351 Cleveland was replaced by the updated 351M and the 351 Cobra Jet was retired (from all Ford vehicles); the 400 and 460 remained options.

=== Body design ===
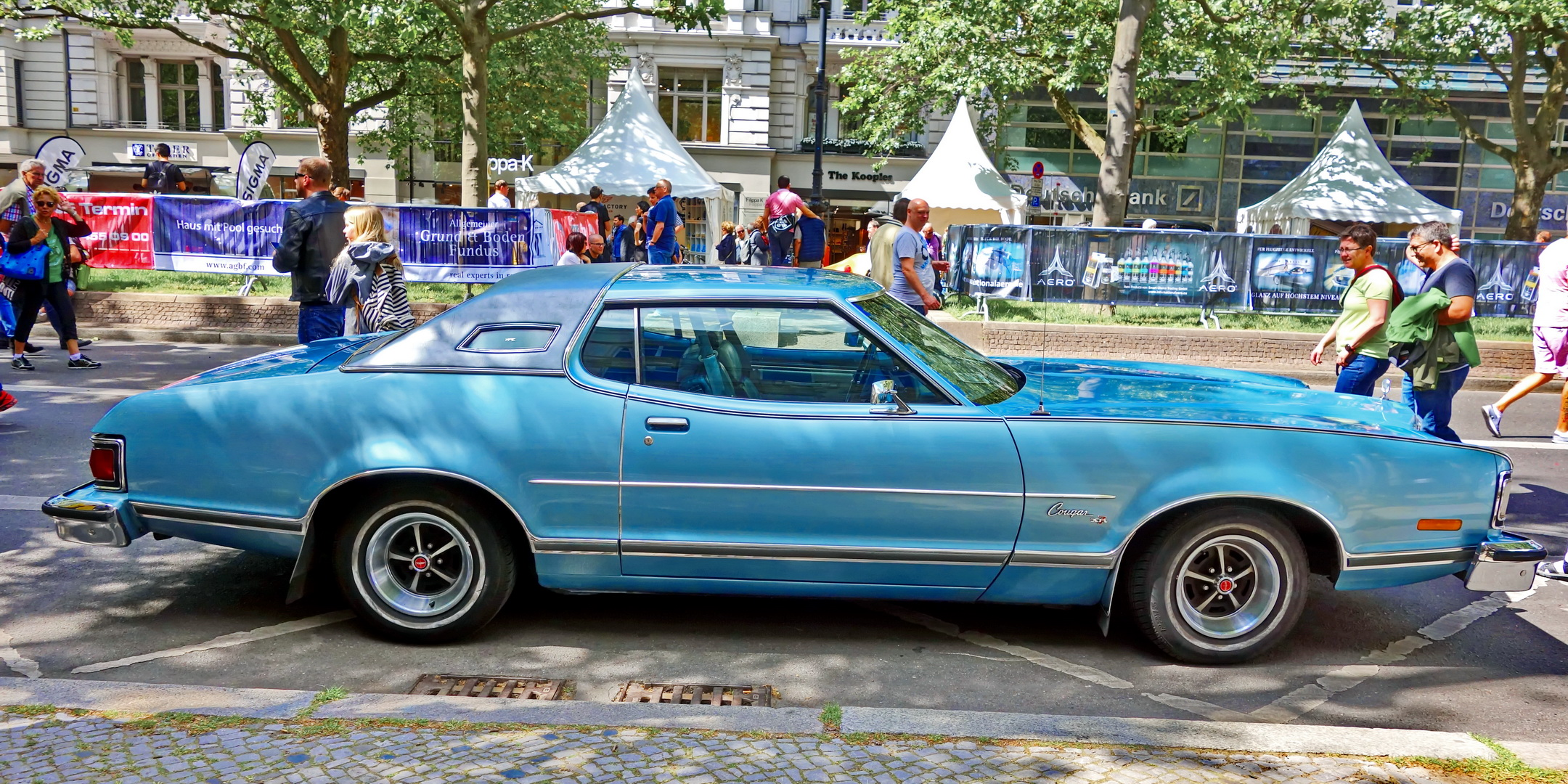
1975–1976 Mercury Cougar XR-7

Sharing its bodyshell with the Ford Elite and the Mercury Montego MX Brougham coupe, the third-generation Cougar was offered solely as a two-door coupe, dropping the convertible from the previous generations. Styled with a roofline similar to the Thunderbird (and its Mark IV counterpart), the Cougar was not a true hardtop; while fitted with frameless door glass and lacking a fixed B-pillar, the rear side glass was fixed in place (did not retract).

To accommodate federal safety standards, 5-mph bumpers were added to both the front and rear fascias (front 5-mph bumpers were required for 1973).

==== Exterior ====
To distinguish the model line from the Montego MX Brougham, the Cougar was fitted with C-pillar opera windows. While a feature shared with its Ford Elite counterpart, the Cougar adopted an opera window design similar to the Thunderbird. On all Cougars, a vinyl roof was fitted as standard equipment.

While fitted with a redesigned front bumper, the third-generation Cougar adopted many design elements of its front fascia from the previous generation, carrying over a center-section waterfall grille opening bordered by horizontal-trimmed openings with four inset headlights (in contrast to the egg-crate grille of the Elite with twin headlights). In contrast to the Montego, the rear fascia Cougar was fitted with a center panel matching the taillights (also hiding the fuel cap), along with vertically slatted chrome trim (similar to the first-generation Cougar). The body sides were styled with a wide side molding matching the bumper rub strips (a design added to the 1975 Grand Marquis).

In line with larger Lincoln-Mercury vehicles, the Cougar received a hood ornament for the first time, using a "prowling cat" emblem.

The body of the third-generation Cougar saw few changes throughout its production; for 1975, the front bumper was updated with the functional addition of two cooling slots below the grille.

==== Interior ====
Fitted with much of the interior of the Montego coupe, the Cougar differed primarily in its instrument panel (fitted with a tachometer instead of a clock and other performance-related gauges) and upgraded options. Six-passenger seating was standard with a "Twin Comfort Lounge" 50/50 split bench seat with cloth or vinyl upholstery. As an option, five-passenger seating was offered with front bucket seats (with vinyl upholstery) and a center console with a floor-mounted transmission shifter.

For 1976, the Cougar saw minor revisions to the interior. The seats underwent a redesign, with a full-width bench seat becoming standard; the 60/40 split bench seat became an option alongside the bucket-seat interior.

=== Production ===
Model year	Units
1974	91,670
1975	62,987
1976	83,765

== Fourth generation (1977–1979) ==
Fourth generation
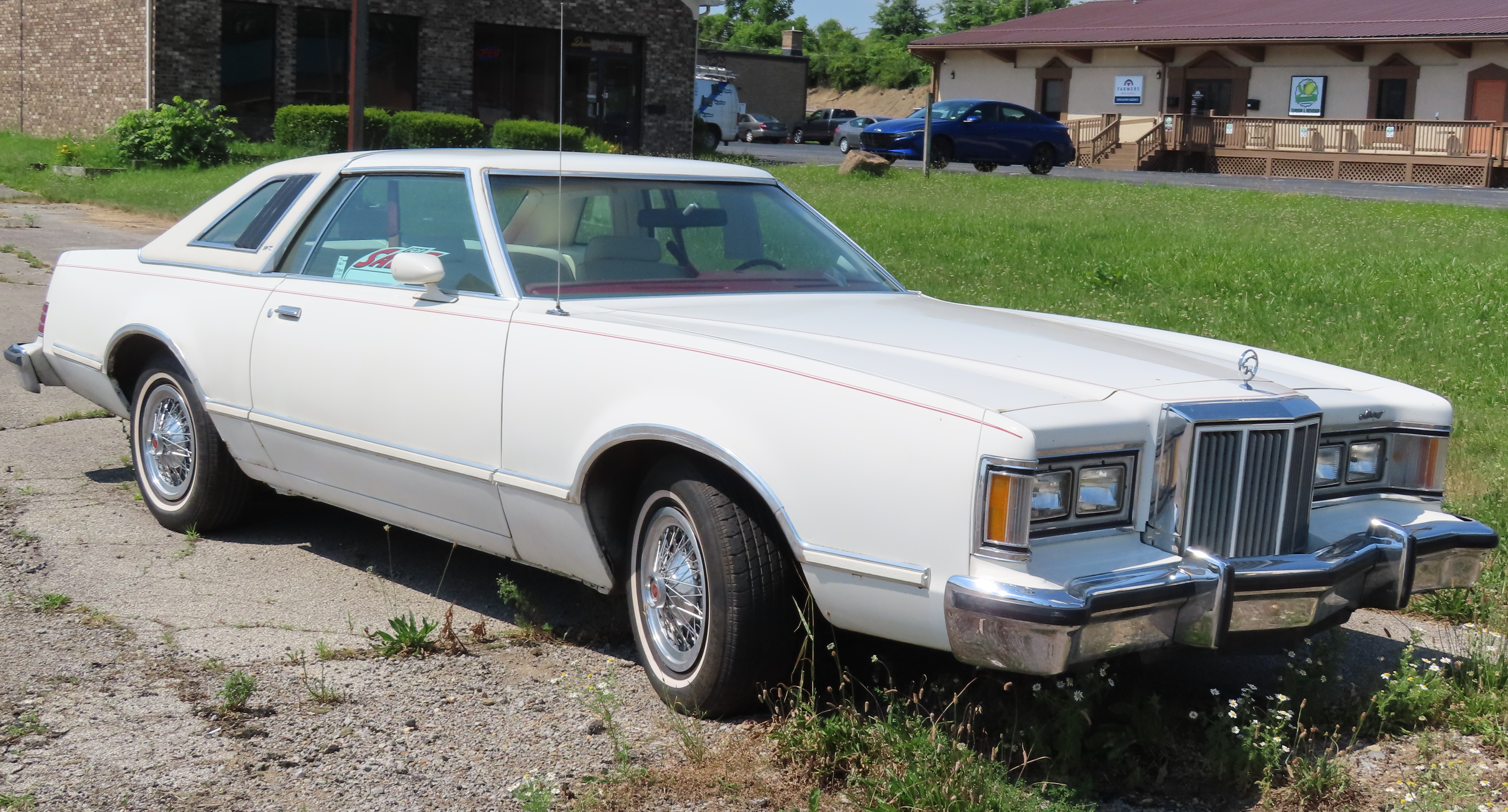
- 1977–1979 Mercury Cougar XR-7

Overview
- Model years: 1977–1979
- Assembly: Hapeville, Georgia, United States (Atlanta Assembly: 1977 XR-7 only); Lorain, Ohio, United States; Pico Rivera, California, United States

Body and chassis
- Body style: Four-door sedan Four-door station wagon Two-door coupe
- Layout: FR layout
- Related: Ford LTD II; Ford Thunderbird

Powertrain
- Engine: 302 cu in (4.9 L) V8; 351 cu in (5.8 L) V8; 400 cu in (6.6 L) V8
- Transmission: C4 automatic FMX automatic C6 automatic

Dimensions
- Wheelbase: Coupe: 114.0 in (2,896 mm); Sedan and Wagon: 118 in (3,000 mm)
- Length: Coupe: 215.5 in (5,473.7 mm); Sedan: 219.5 in (5,580 mm); Wagon: 223.1 in (5,670 mm)
- Width: 75.2 in (1,910.1 mm)
- Height: 52.6 in (1,336.0 mm)

Chronology
- Predecessor: Mercury Montego (non XR-7 Cougar)

For the 1977 model year, Lincoln-Mercury released the fourth-generation Mercury Cougar, with two versions of the model line introduced. Replacing the Mercury Montego, the standard Cougar now served as the Mercury intermediate model line (slotted between the Mercury Monarch and Mercury Marquis), serving as the Mercury counterpart of the Ford LTD II (replacing the Torino/Gran Torino), introducing the first Cougar sedans and station wagons. The increased number of body styles and market segments resulted in these Cougars to be more popular than any since its 1967 debut, selling about half as many copies as its first version.

The Cougar XR-7 also returned as a personal luxury coupe, now a counterpart of the Ford Thunderbird, a pairing that lasted through 1997. In what would be used as a design feature for the model line through 2002, the "cat's head" emblem made its first appearance.

A heavy exterior revision of the 1974–1976 generation, the fourth generation was marketed against the introduction of downsized competitors. However, this generation would prove the most successful in the marketplace, with the XR-7 remaining the most popular version.

=== Chassis ===
As with its predecessor, the fourth-generation Cougar was based on the Ford Torino "split-wheelbase" chassis. A 114-inch wheelbase was used for the two-door Cougar coupe and the Cougar XR-7; a 118-inch wheelbase was used for the four-door sedan and station wagon.

The fourth-generation Cougar underwent a revision of its powertrain offerings, largely in the interest of fuel economy. The 460 cubic-inch V8 was withdrawn from Torino-chassis intermediates, leaving a 173 hp 400 cubic-inch V8 as the highest-displacement engine. For non XR-7 Cougars, the standard engine was the 302 cu in (4.9 L) V8, producing 134 hp (the first version of the engine since 1970); station wagons received a standard 351W V8 (149 hp), with a 161 hp 351M V8 offered as an option in coupes and sedans. All engines were paired with a 3-speed automatic transmission.

For 1978, the engine lineup was carryover; for 1979, the 400 was discontinued.

=== Body design ===
For 1977, Mercury replaced its Montego intermediate range with the Cougar nameplate. Along with returning the standard Cougar name (for the first time since 1973), the change added three more body styles. Alongside the Cougar XR-7 personal luxury coupe, Mercury now offered the Cougar two-door coupe, four-door sedan, and five-door station wagon.

Largely intended as a stopgap during the development of future production models, the 1977 redesign of the Ford intermediate range transitioned the exterior from the early 1970s "fuselage styling" to the sharper-edge lines of the Fox and Panther platform sedans in development for the 1980s. The revised front end adopted a larger radiator-style grille and four rectangular headlamps.

While limited funds precluded a complete redesign or downsizing of the Torino intermediates, all sheet metal (above the bumpers) was revised. As a revision of the rear bodywork of station wagons was deemed too extensive, the Cougar wagon adopted the 1977 front fascia with the body shell of the previous Montego wagon. For 1978, the Cougar wagon was discontinued to make way for the all-new Mercury Zephyr wagon and the downsized 1979 Mercury Colony Park wagon (4 inches shorter).

For 1979, though in its last year, the Cougar adopted several body revisions, with revised taillamps and body-color grille inserts, along with an electronic voltage regulator and a plastic battery tray.

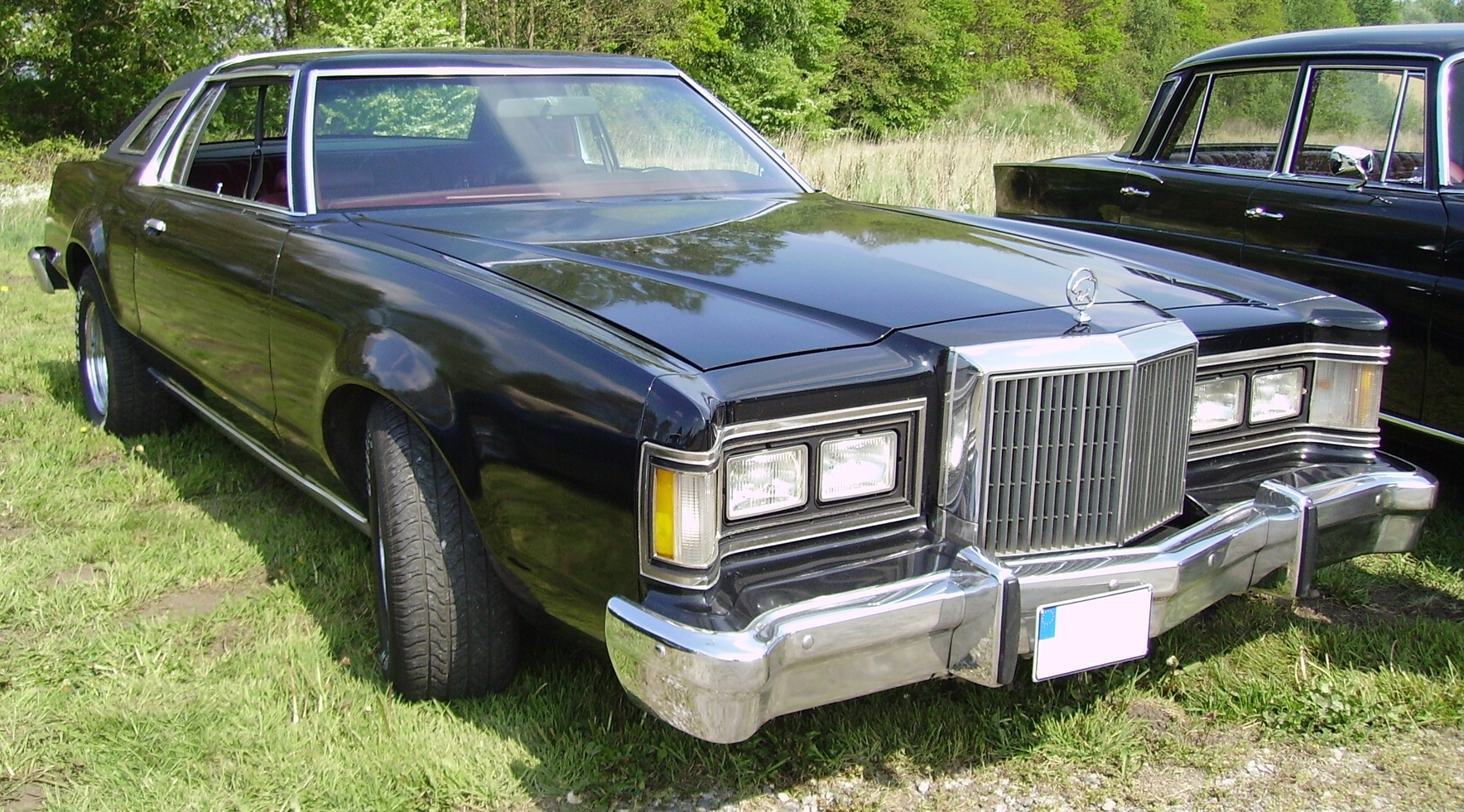
1977 Mercury Cougar two-door

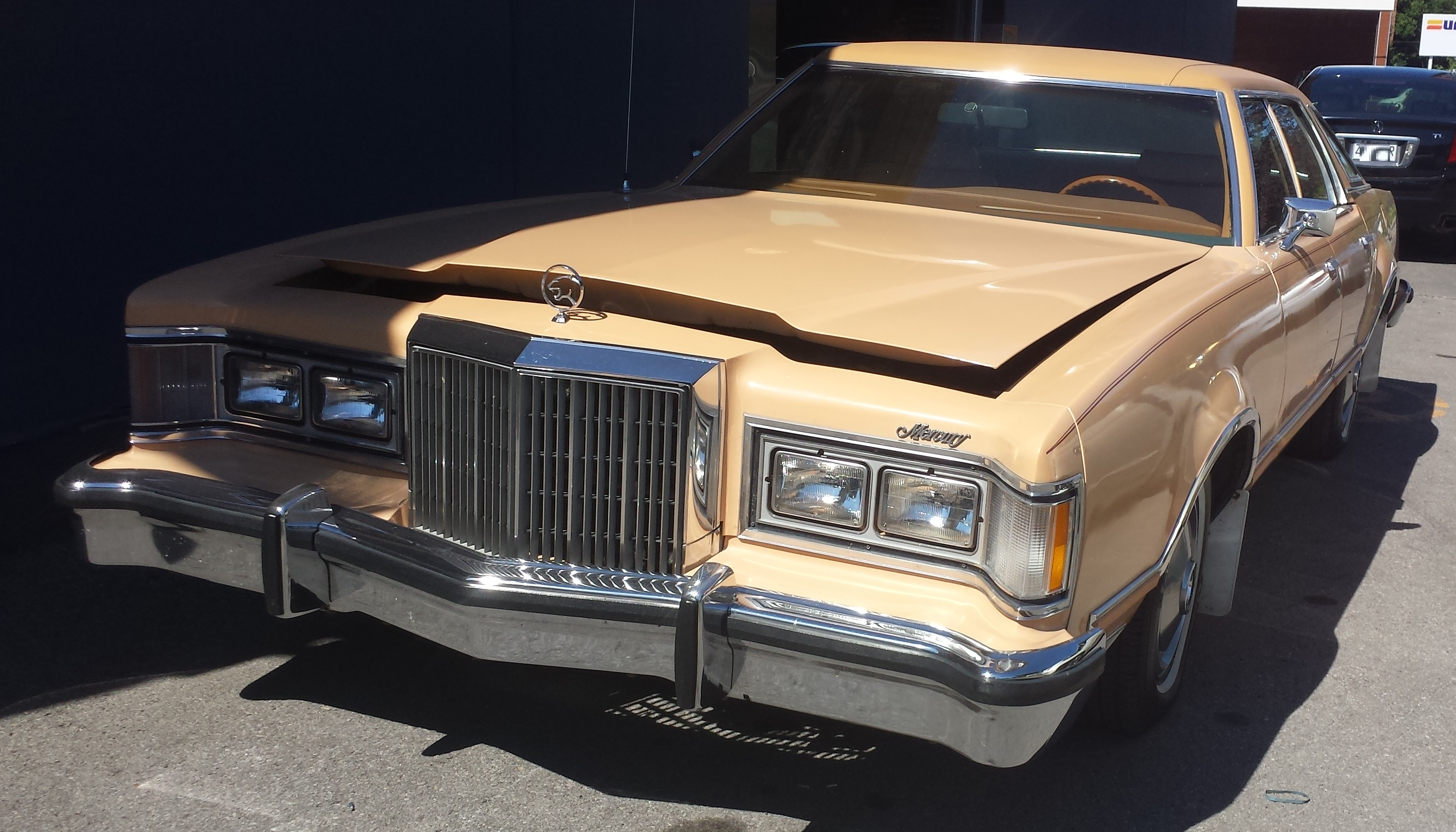
Mercury Cougar 4-door

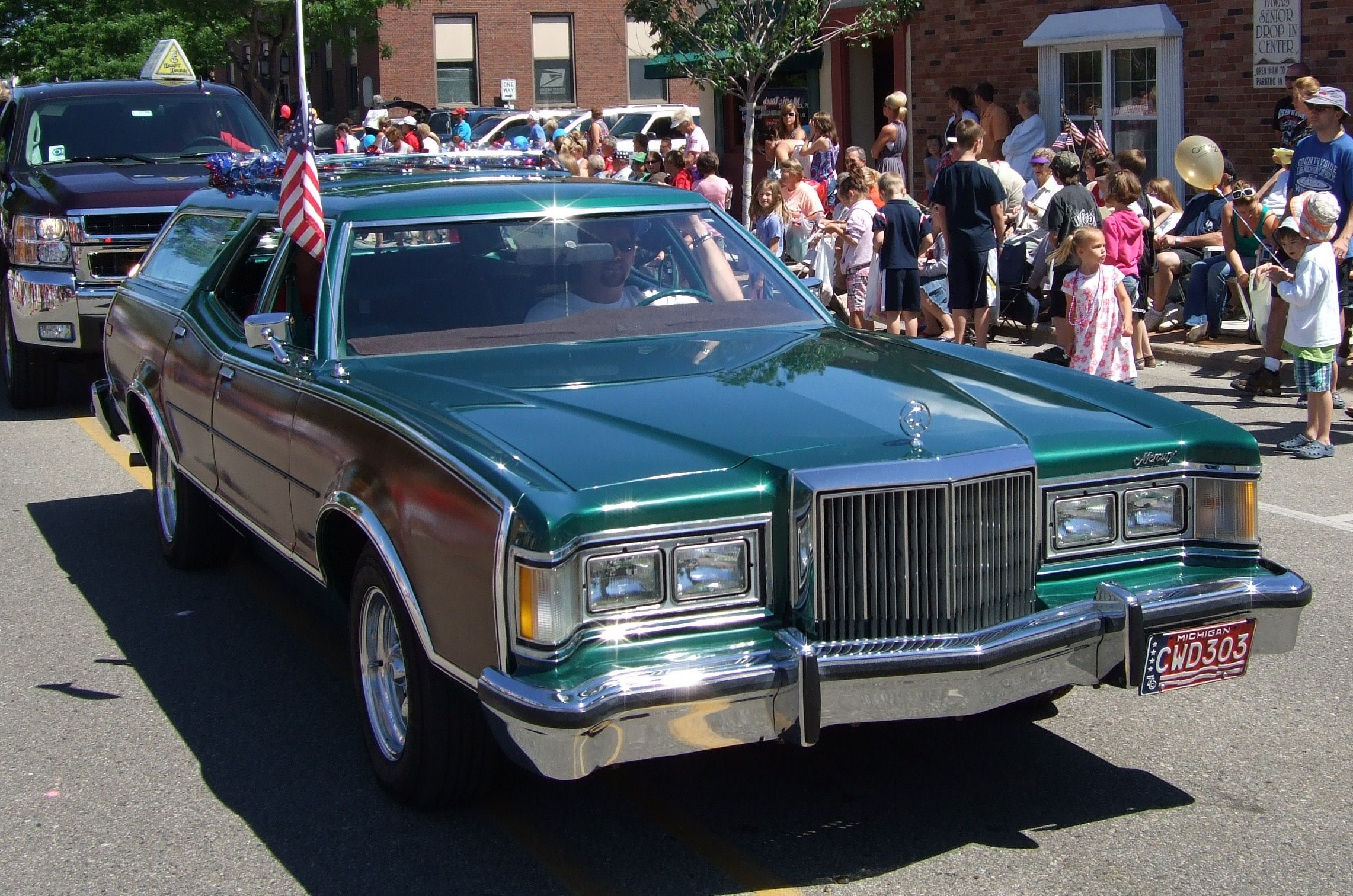
1977 Mercury Cougar Villager wagon

=== Trim ===
For 1977, the Cougar was introduced in three trim levels: a base trim level and a Brougham trim (for wagons, a wood-paneled Villager trim was offered). For 1978, the Cougar became a single trim level, with the Brougham returning as an option package.

==== Cougar XR-7 ====
Returning from the previous generation, the Cougar XR-7 continued as a personal luxury coupe. Now serving as the flagship model of the Cougar line, the XR-7 was now the direct Mercury equivalent of the Ford Thunderbird; for 1977, the latter had shifted from the Mark IV to the Torino chassis (replacing the Elite).

Though sharing its front fascia with the standard Cougar, the XR-7 was distinguished by its roofline (with hardtop-style windows), louvers on the opera windows, and unique rear fascia. Evoking the flagship Continental Mark V, the rear fascia was given a (vestigial) continental tire trunk lid (with a trapezoidal design) and horizontal taillights similar to the Continental Mark IV.

The XR-7 included power disc brakes and steering, 15-inch wheels, a rear stabilizer bar, walnut wood-tone instrument panel, a Flight Bench seat, "XR-7" trunk key-hole door, "COUGAR" decklid script, large hood ornament (with cat emblem), and sport-styled roofline with back-half vinyl and rear opera side windows and louvers. Some XR-7s had the Rally Sport Tachometer and Gauge package (only 25% of all Cougars came with this option).

For 1978, two new decor packages became available, the XR-7 Decor Option and the Midnight/Chamois Decor Option. In line with the Designer Series from the Mark V, the latter option offered a color-coordinated exterior and interior, with a half-vinyl roof, padded "Continental" type rear deck, and Midnight Blue and Chamois interior with Tiffany carpeting.

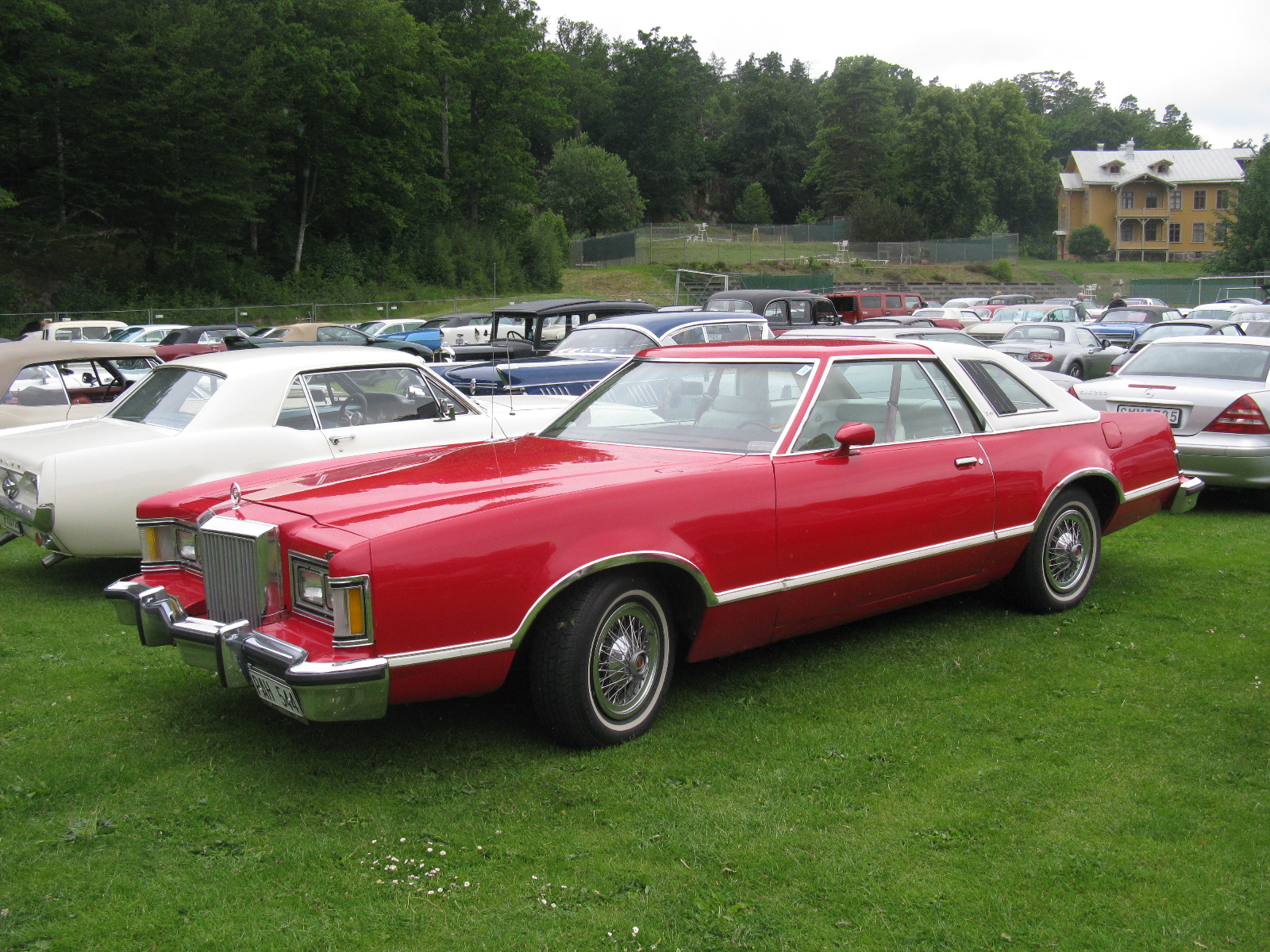
1977–1978 Cougar XR-7

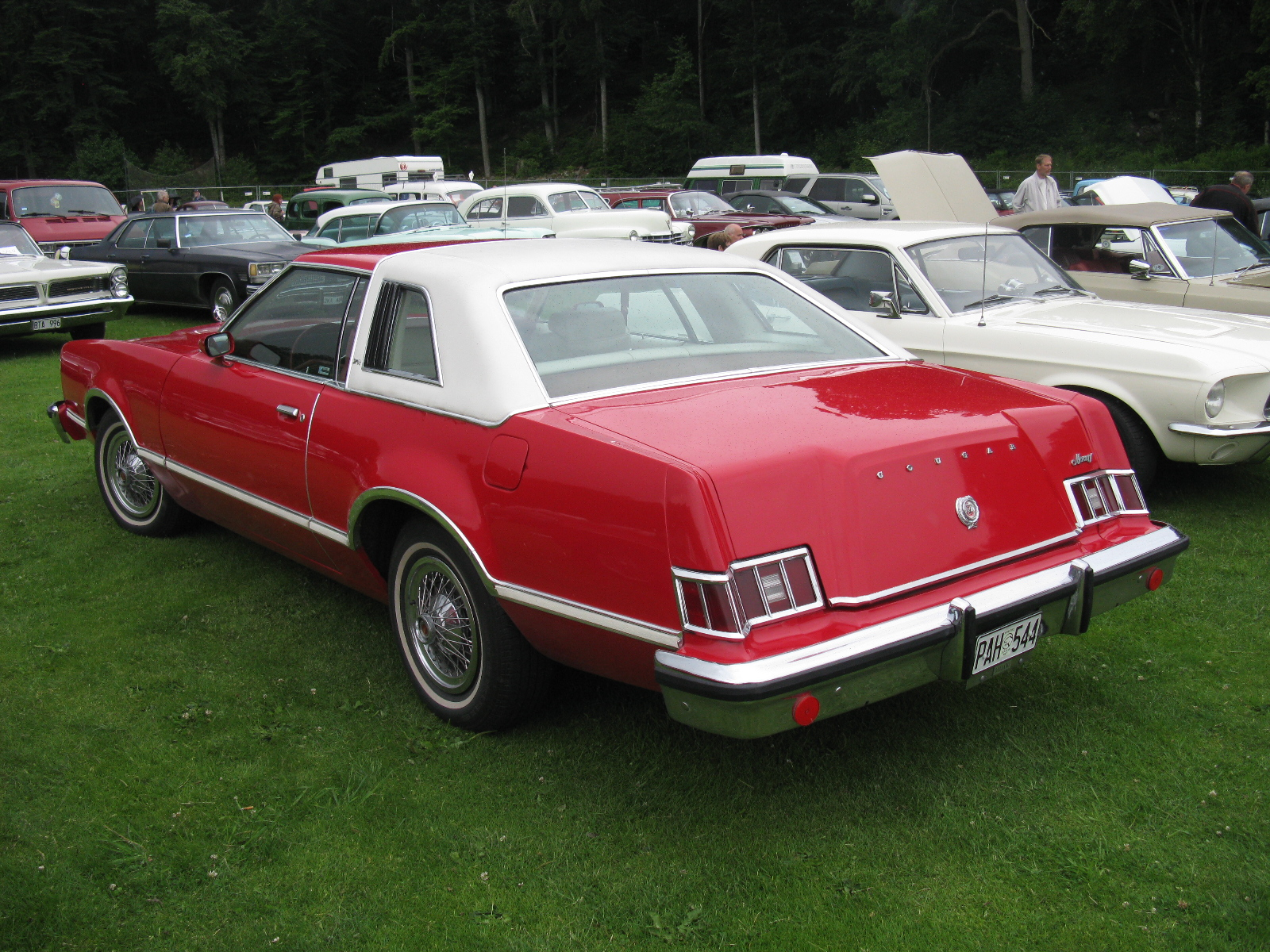
1977–1978 Cougar XR-7

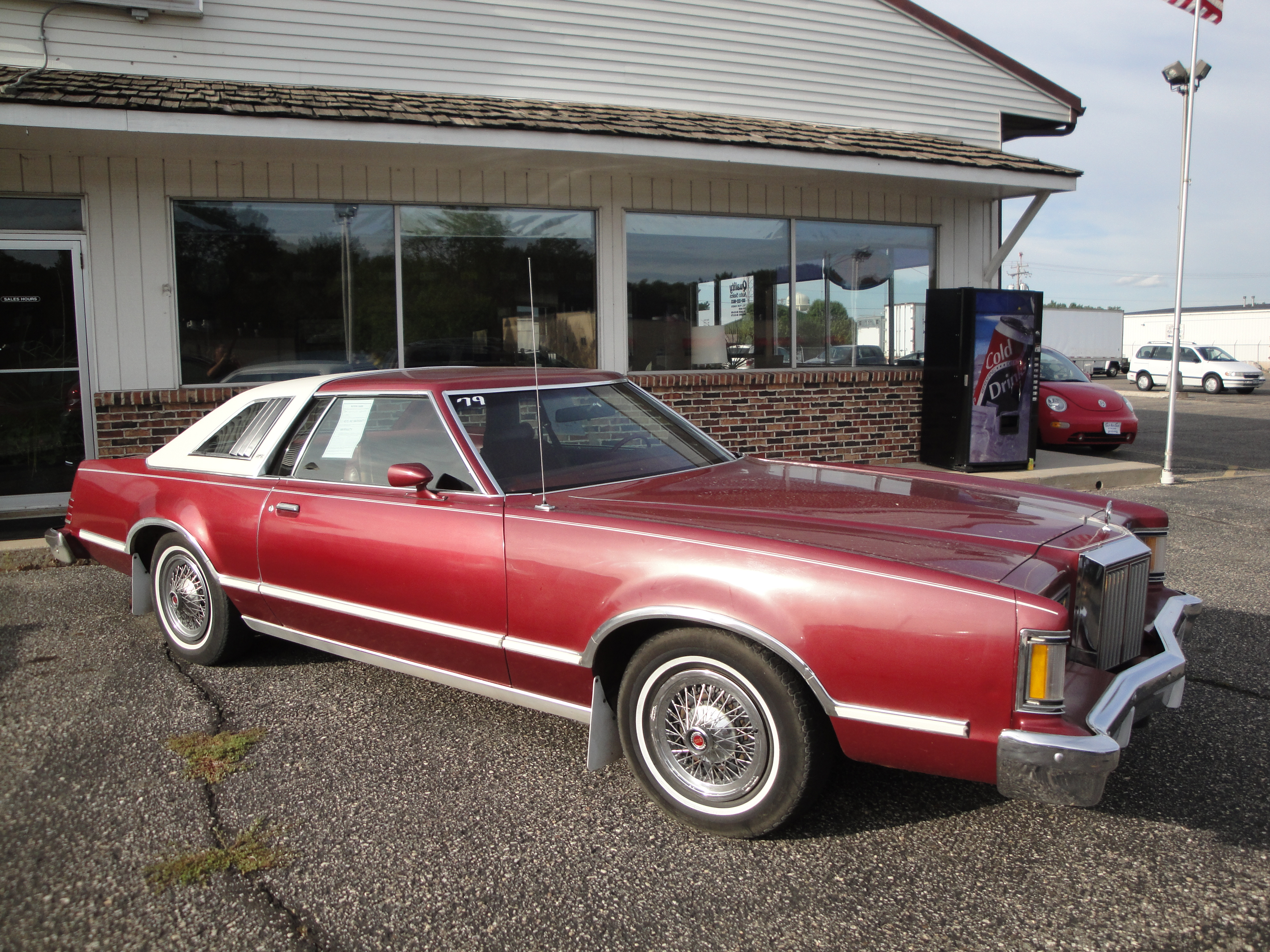
1979 Cougar XR-7

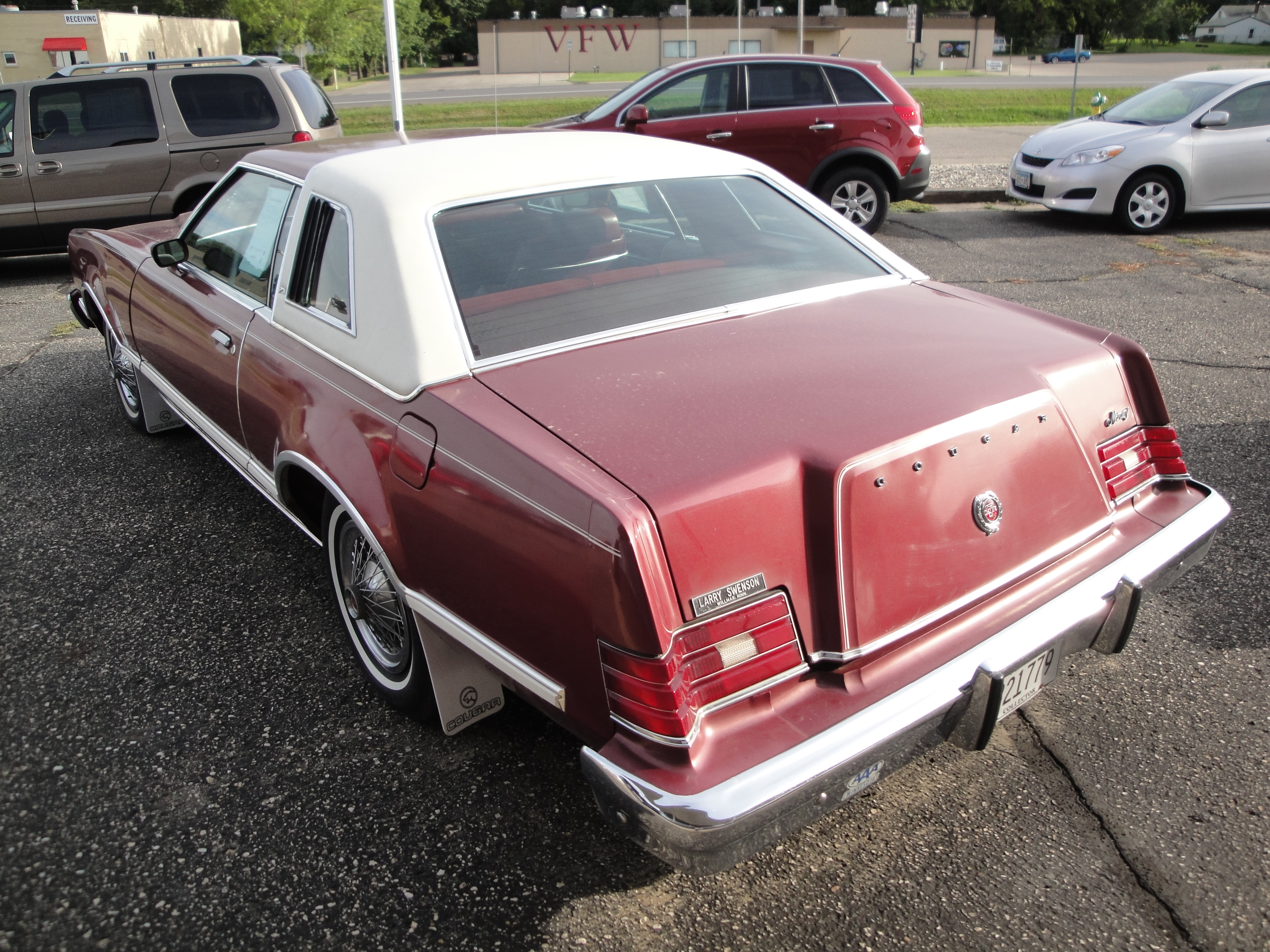
1979 Cougar XR-7

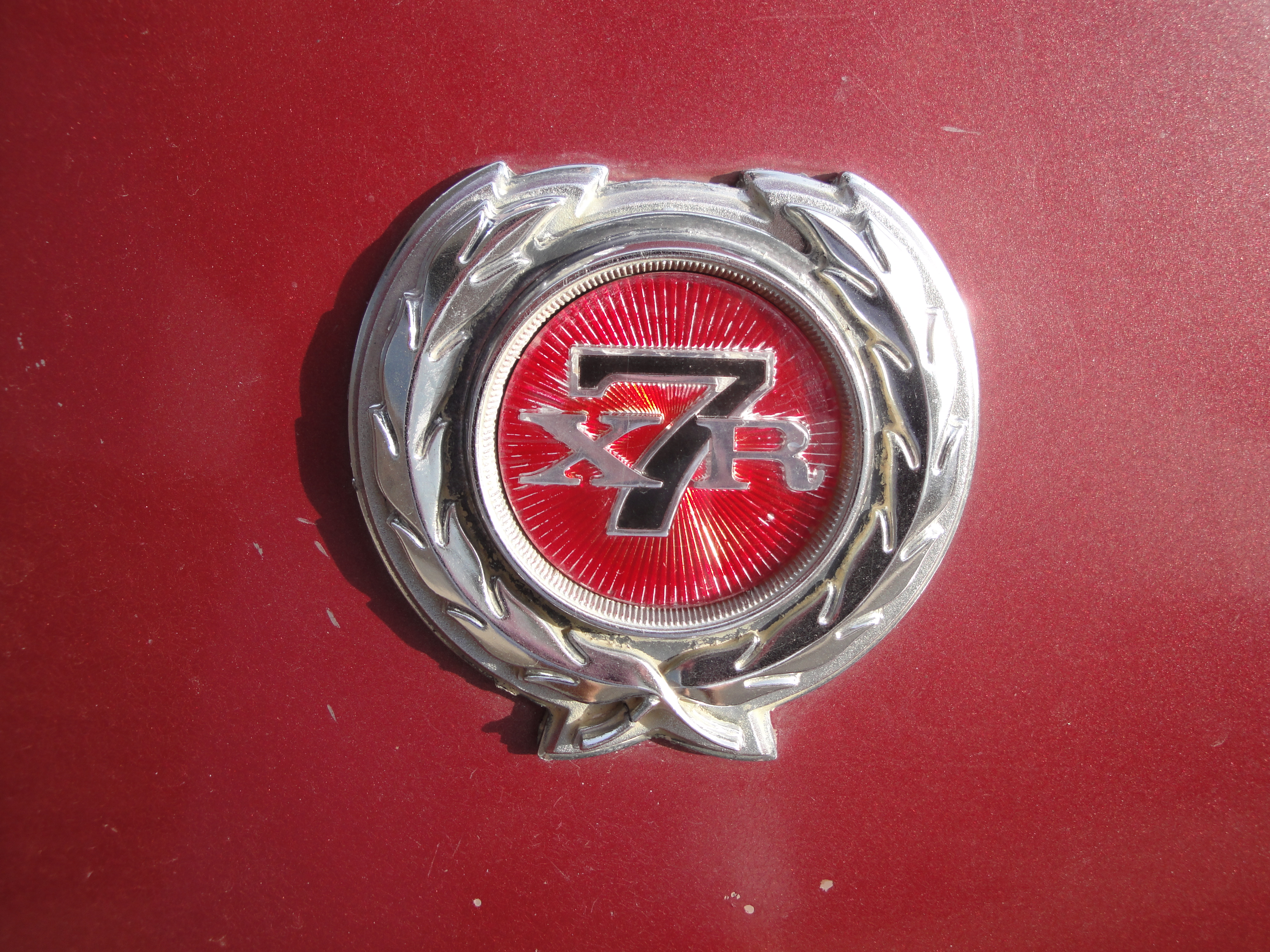
Cougar XR-7 decklid emblem

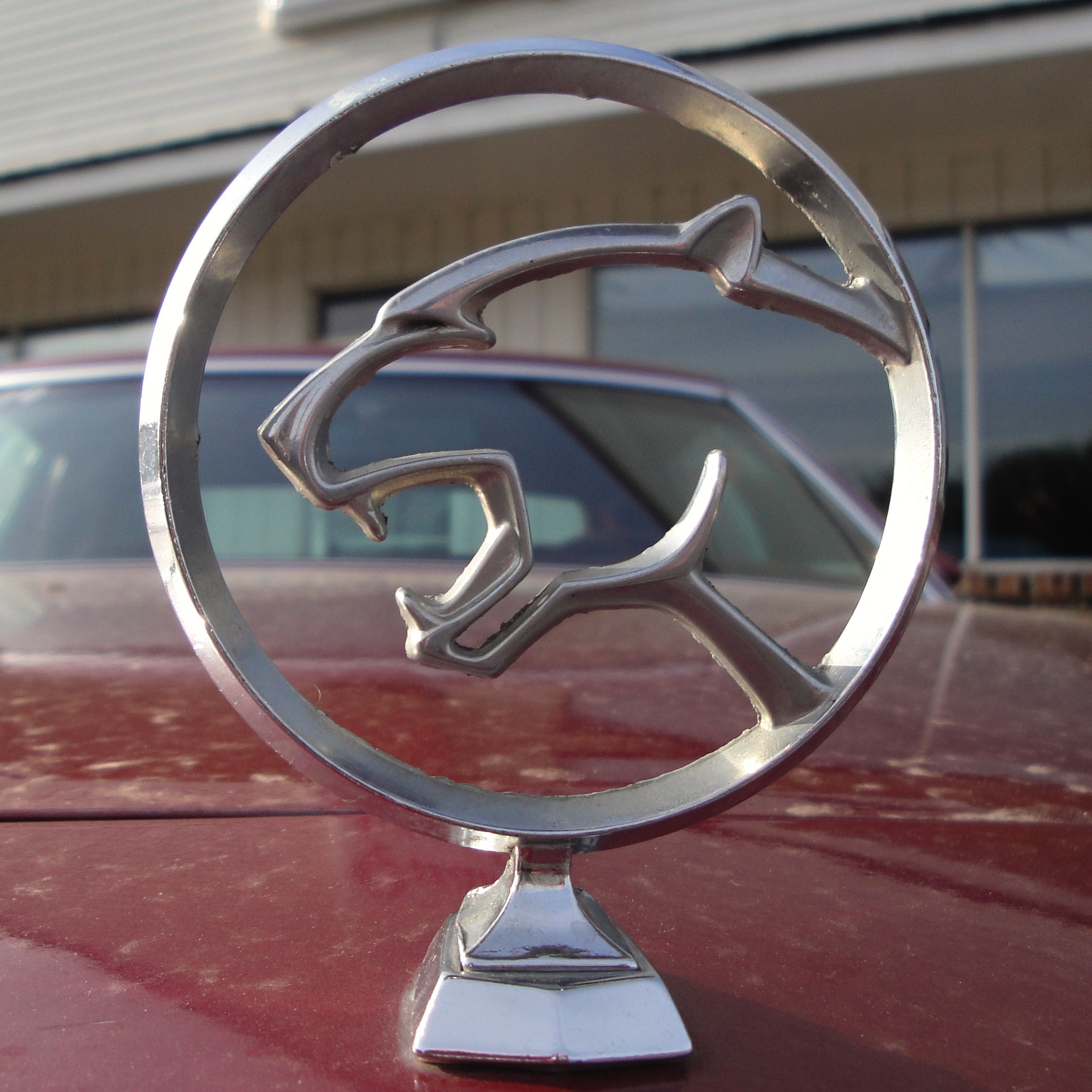
Cougar XR-7 hood ornament

=== Production ===
Model year	Units
1977	194,823 (XR-7 124,799)
1978	213,270 (XR-7 166,508)
1979	172,152 (XR-7 163,716)

== Fifth generation (1980–1982) ==
Fifth generation
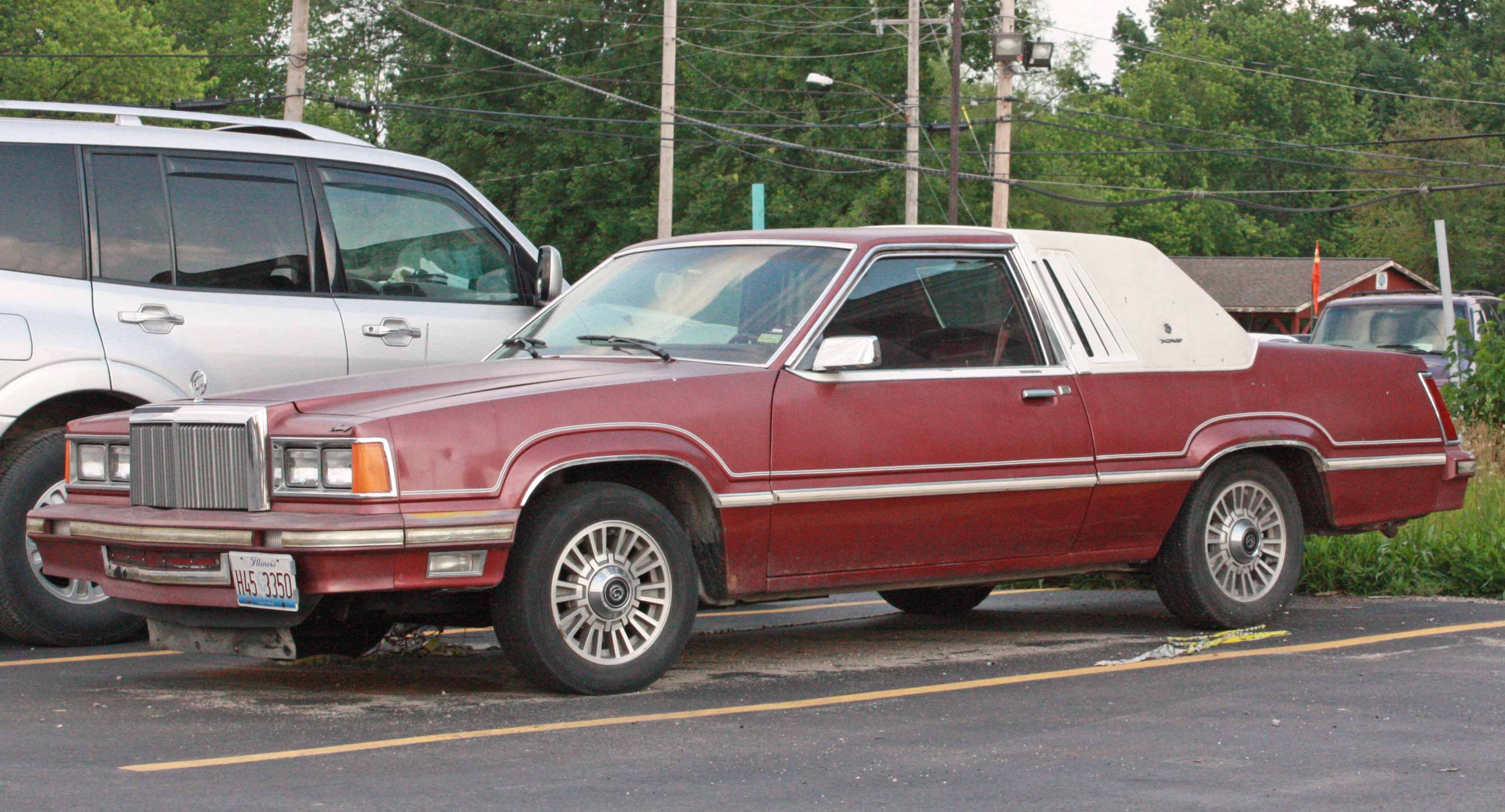
- 1980–82 Mercury Cougar XR-7

Overview
- Also called: Ford Cougar (Venezuela, sedans)
- Model years: 1980–1982
- Assembly: Lorain, Ohio, United States (XR-7 only); Chicago, Illinois, United States (Granada-based models only); Atlanta, Georgia, United States (Granada-based models only)

Body and chassis
- Body style: Two-door coupe Two-door sedan Four-door sedan Four-door station wagon
- Layout: FR layout
- Platform: Ford Fox platform
- Related: Cougar XR-7: Ford Thunderbird; Continental/Lincoln Mark VII; Cougar (1981–1982): Ford Granada; Lincoln Continental

Powertrain
- Engine: 255 cu in (4.2 L) Windsor V8; 302 cu in (4.9 L) Windsor V8; 140 cu in (2.3 L) Lima I4; 232 cu in (3.8 L) Essex V6; 200 cu in (3.3 L) Thriftpower Six I6
- Transmission: 5-speed Tremec T-5 manual 3-speed C5 automatic 4-speed AOD automatic

Dimensions
- Wheelbase: 105.5 in (2,680 mm); 108.4 in (2,753 mm) (XR-7)

Chronology
- Predecessor: Mercury Monarch (non-XR7 two-door, four-door); Mercury Zephyr (station wagon)
- Successor: Mercury Marquis (non XR7); Mercury Cougar (sixth generation) (for XR7)

For the 1980 model year, Mercury downsized the Cougar XR-7. Alongside its Thunderbird counterpart, the XR-7 entered the mid-size segment for the first time, shedding 15 inches in length, 4 inches in width, and approximately 900 pounds of curb weight (depending on the powertrain).

For 1981, Mercury added a standard-trim Cougar, replacing the Monarch as its mid-size offering; the line shared its two-door and four-door sedan body with the second-generation Ford Granada. In a first, a V8 engine was no longer standard equipment (on this version). For 1982, the Cougar inherited the 5-door station wagon body from the Zephyr, as Mercury sought to move that design upmarket.

Coinciding with a negative market reception, the fifth-generation Cougar was replaced for 1983 by a substantial redesign of the XR-7; the standard Cougar was updated, becoming the Mercury Marquis as Ford revised its full-size and mid-size product branding (ultimately replaced by the Sable for 1986).

=== Chassis ===
Both the Cougar XR-7 and mid-size Cougar were produced using the Ford Fox platform. The Cougar XR-7 was produced upon an extended-wheelbase Fox chassis (108.5 inches), shared with the 1980–1982 Ford Thunderbird, 1982–1987 Lincoln Continental, 1984–1992 Continental/Lincoln Mark VII. The mid-size Cougar shared its 105.5-inch wheelbase with the 1981–1982 Ford Granada and the Ford Fairmont and Mercury Zephyr (the introductory vehicles of the Fox platform).

==== Powertrain ====
The Cougar XR7 was offered with two V8 engines. Shared with the Mercury Marquis/Colony Park, a 4.2L V8 was standard, with a 4.9L V8 offered as an option; both engines were paired with a 4-speed Ford AOD overdrive automatic.

The standard Cougar was offered with a standard 2.3L inline-4, offering a 3.3L inline-6 and a 4.2L V8 as options (shared with the Ford Mustang/Mercury Capri). All three engines were paired with a 3-speed automatic transmission.

For 1982, an all-new 3.8L V6 replaced the inline-6; in various forms, the engine would be used by the Cougar and Thunderbird through their 1997 discontinuation. The 4.9L V8 option was discontinued for 1982, leaving the 4.2L engine as the sole V8 offering for either version of the Cougar.

=== Body ===
In its development, many design elements of the 1977–1979 Cougar XR-7 were carried forward in the fifth-generation redesign, including its Continental-style trunk lid, louvered opera windows, and sharp-edged fender lines. While the fourth-generation Cougar XR-7 had proven successful in the marketplace, the design elements fell out of proportion on a radically smaller car, leading to negative reception. In what would prove disastrous, the Cougar saw little to no differentiation from its Ford counterparts, with the XR-7 externally distinguished from the Thunderbird only by its grille, taillamps, trunklid, and usage of exposed headlamps.

During the production of the fifth-generation Cougar, the Cougar XR-7 was produced solely as a two-door coupe, with the mid-size Cougar produced as a two-door notchback coupe and a four-door sedan. For 1982 only, the mid-size Cougar was offered as a station wagon replacing the Zephyr station wagon. In a first, all two-door Cougars were designed with a fixed B-pillar and fully framed door glass.

In what would become a long-running tradition for the Mercury brand, 1981 marked the debut of GS and LS trim lines for both the mid-size and XR-7 Cougars. Both trim packages were largely similar, though the LS was exclusive to four-doors. The GS package focused on appearance, while the LS package offered luxury touches such as power windows, keyless entry external number pad, and other luxury trim touches. The Cougar station wagon was offered in either GS trim or wood-grained Villager trim (the Mercury equivalent of a Ford Squire station wagon).

Ford of Venezuela marketed the Fox-platform Cougar from 1983 until 1986 as the Ford Cougar Brougham four-door sedan. Derived from the fifth-generation Cougar sedan, the Ford-badged Cougar Brougham was produced with the front and rear fascias of the 1983–1986 Mercury Marquis.

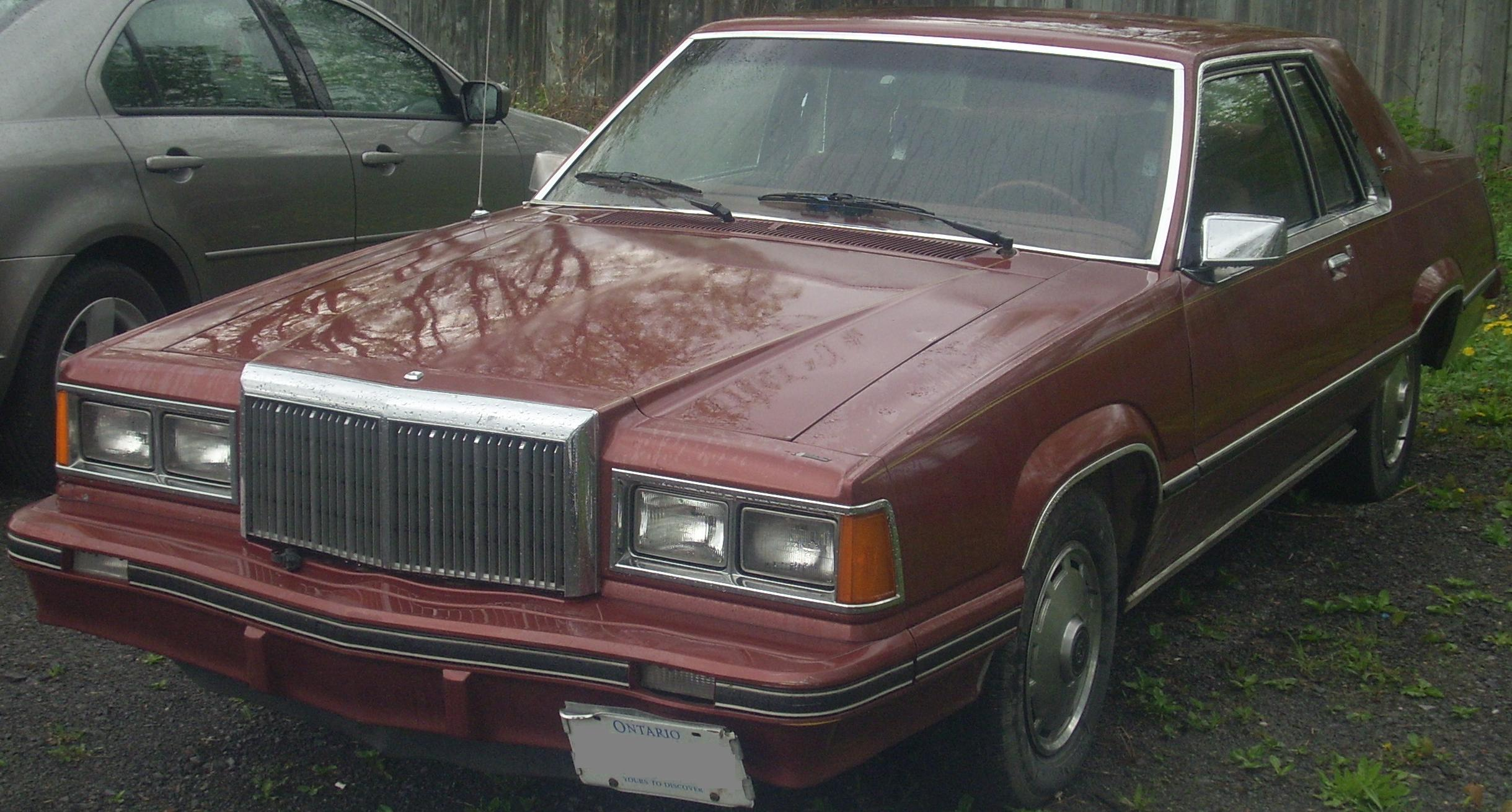
1980–1982 Cougar XR-7 (standard roofline)

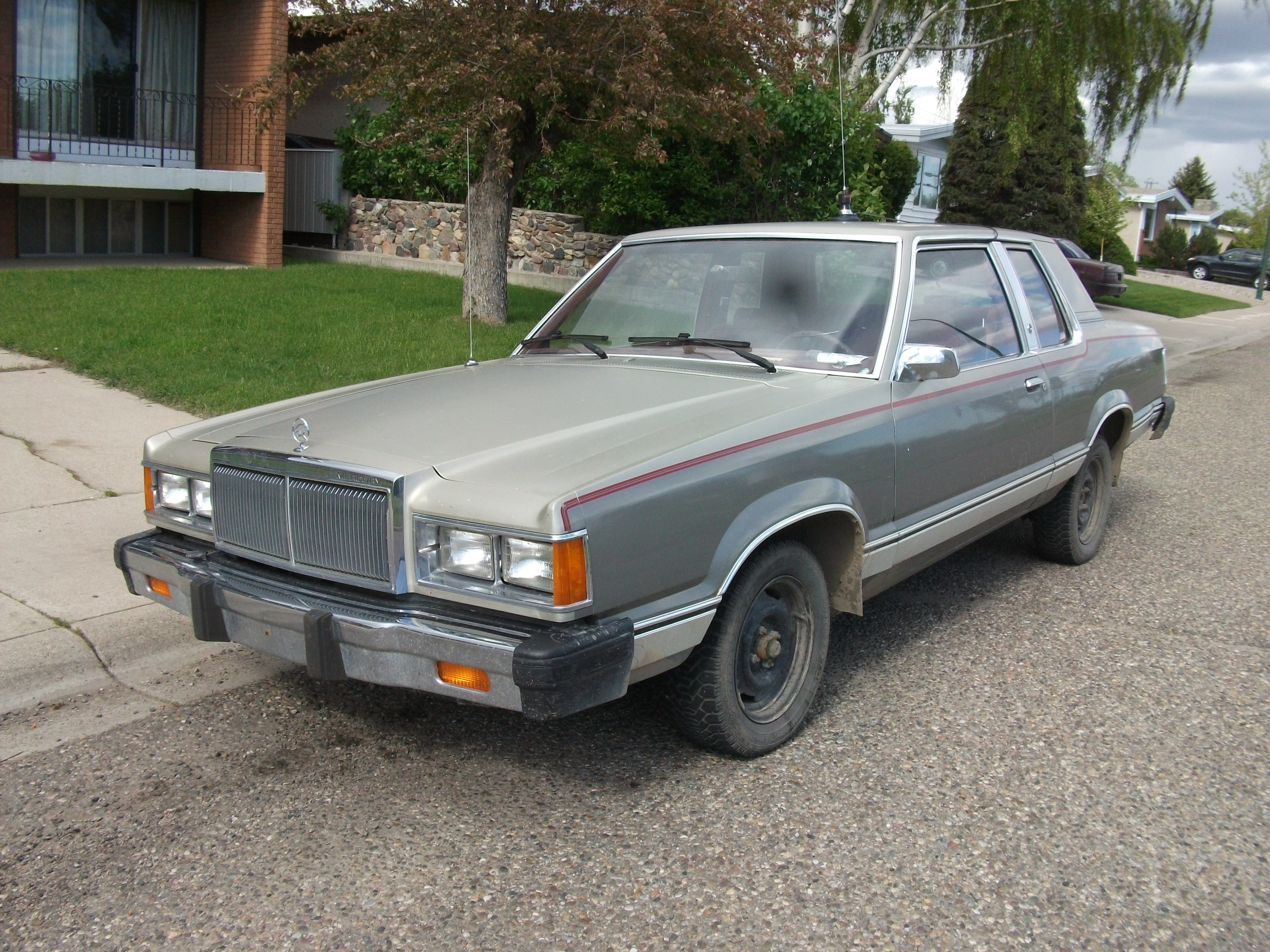
1981 Mercury Cougar two-door

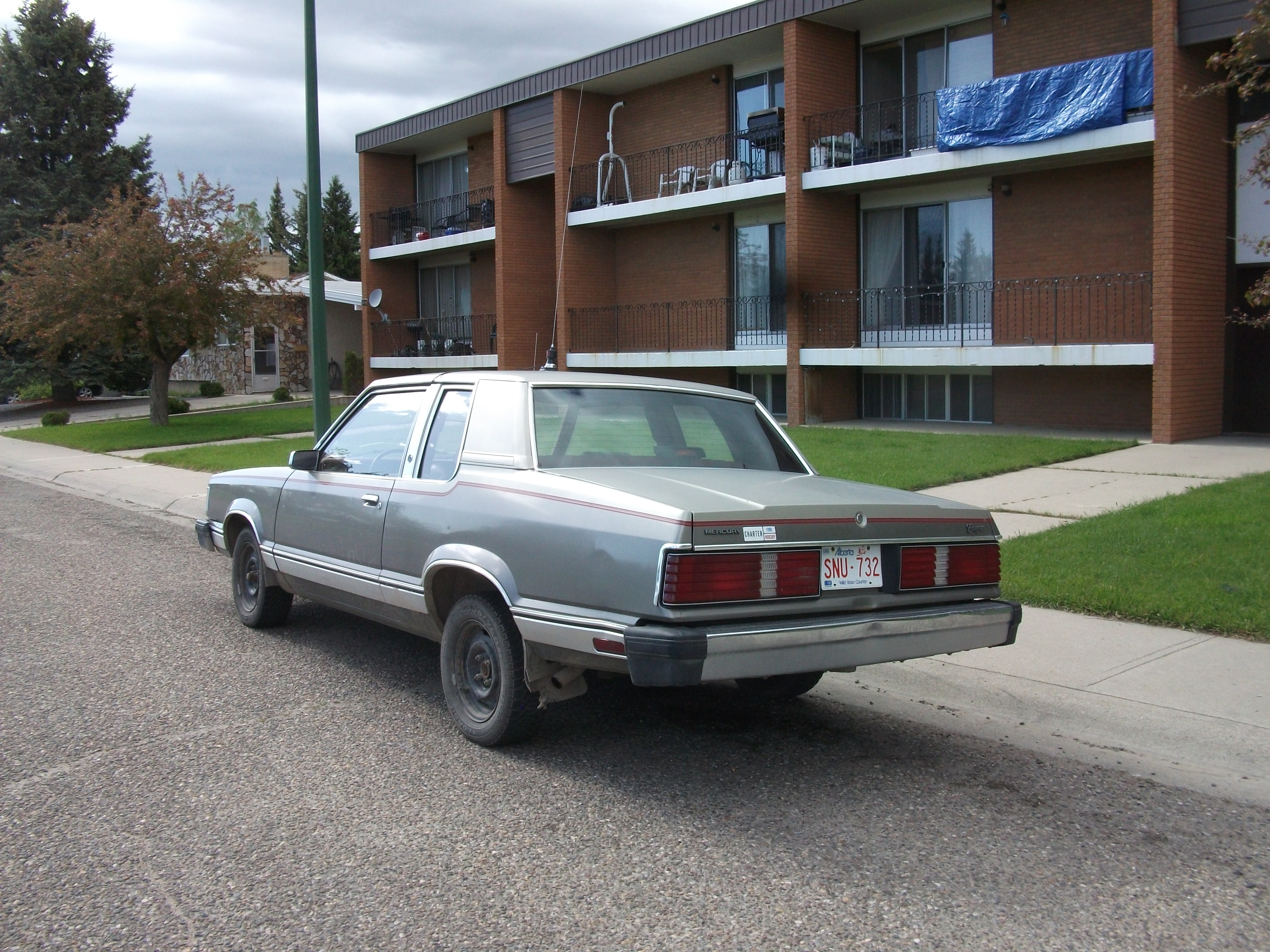
1981 Mercury Cougar two-door

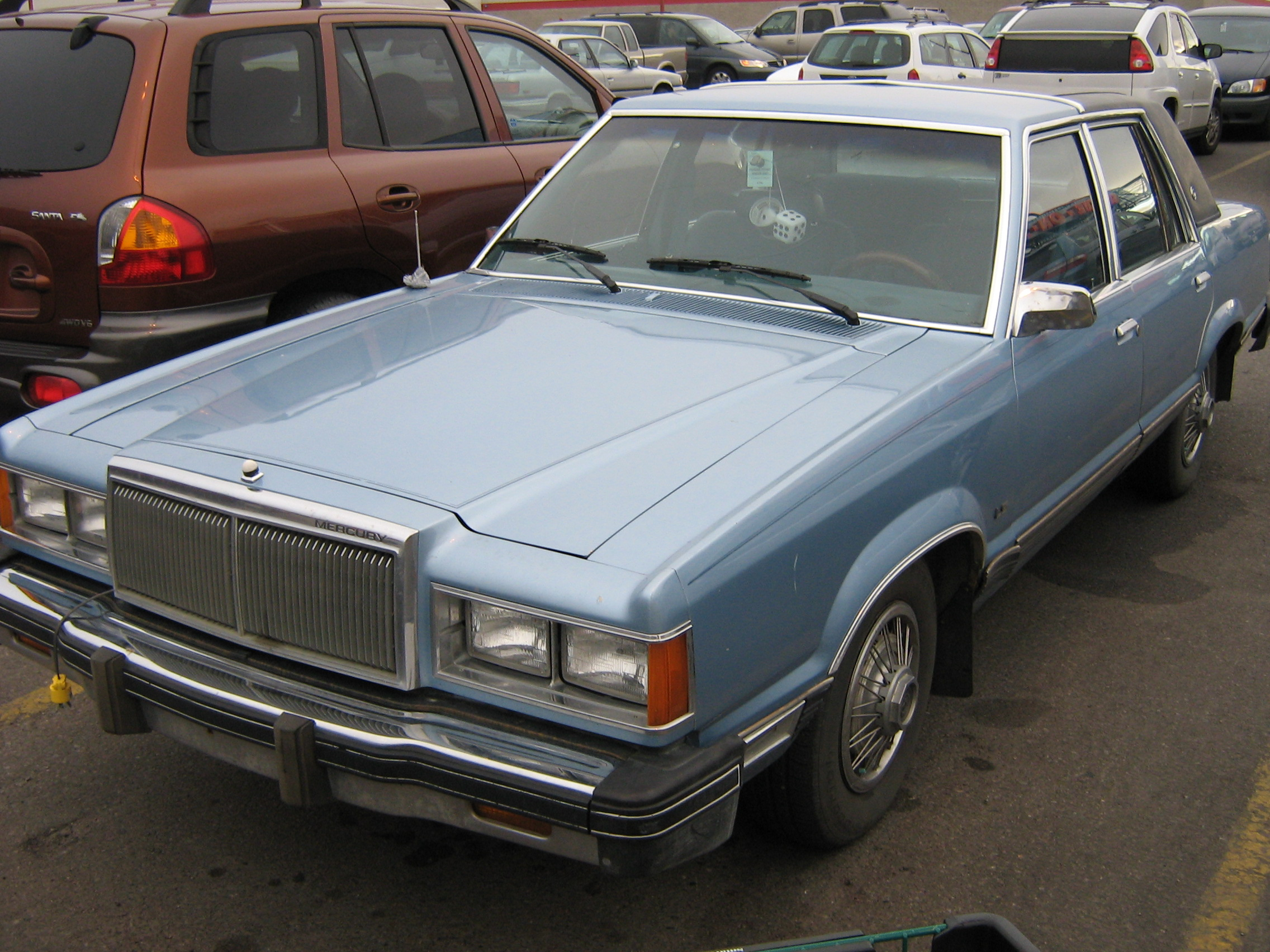
Mercury Cougar LS sedan

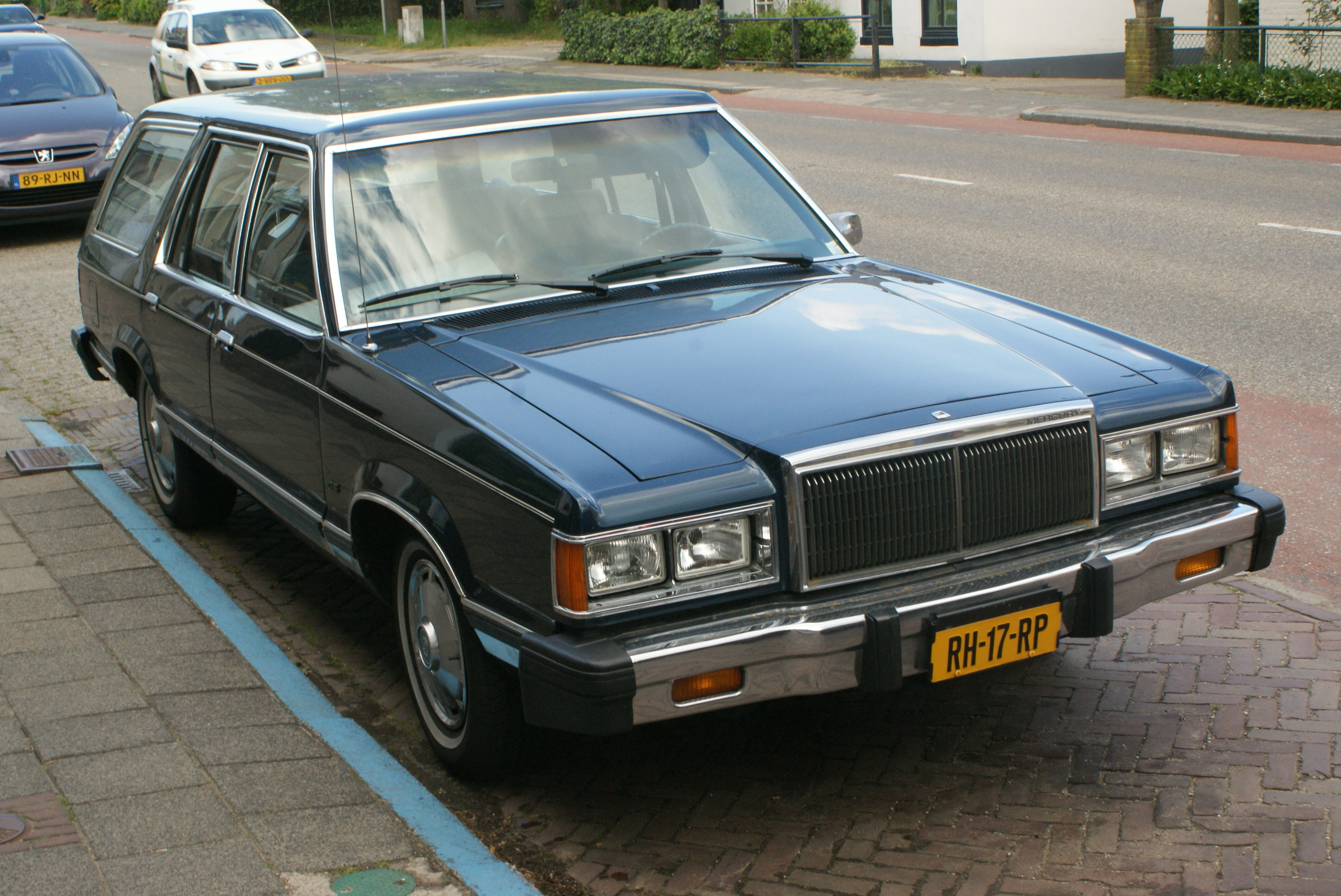
1982 Mercury Cougar wagon (standard trim)

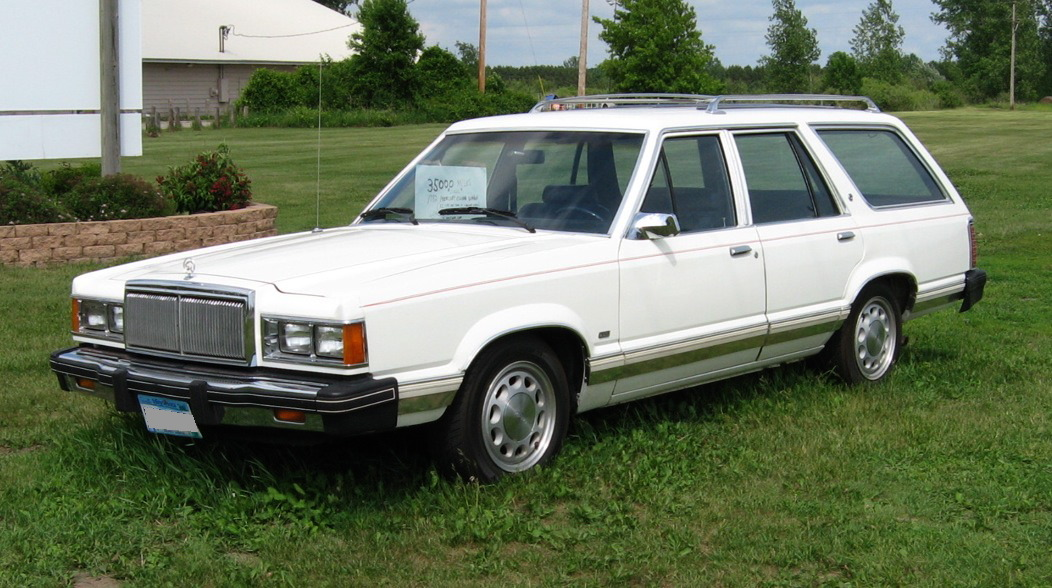
1982 Mercury Cougar GS wagon (Ford Mustang wheels)

=== Production ===
Model year	Units
1980	58,028
1981	90,928
1982	73,817
Total	222,773

== Sixth generation (1983–1988) ==
Sixth generation
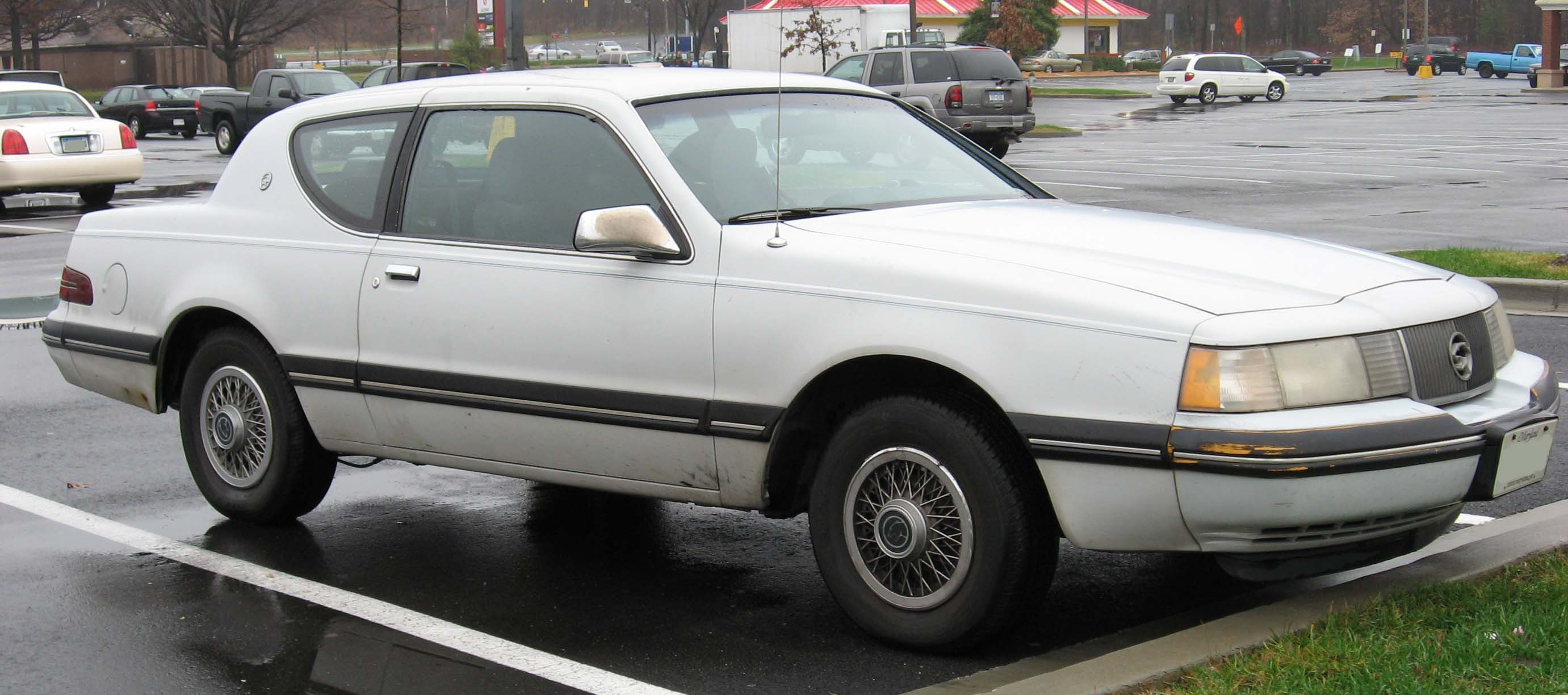
- 1987–1988 Cougar LS

Overview
- Also called: Ford Cougar (Mexico)
- Model years: 1983–1988
- Assembly: Lorain, Ohio, United States (Lorain Assembly); Hapeville, Georgia, United States (Atlanta Assembly: 1984–1985)

Body and chassis
- Body style: 2-door coupe
- Layout: FR layout
- Platform: Ford Fox platform
- Related: Mercury Marquis; Ford Thunderbird; Ford LTD; Continental Mark VII; Lincoln Continental

Powertrain
- Engine: 2.3 L (140 cu in) Lima turbo I4; 3.8 L (232 cu in) Essex V6; 4.9 L (302 cu in) Windsor 5.0 V8
- Transmission: Five-speed Tremec T-5 manual Three-speed C5 automatic Four-speed AOD automatic

Dimensions
- Wheelbase: 104 in (2,642 mm) (1980–86); 104.2 in (2,647 mm) (1987–88)
- Length: 197.6 in (5,019 mm) (1983–86); 200.8 in (5,100 mm) (1987–88)
- Width: 71.1 in (1,806 mm) (1983–86); 70.1 in (1,781 mm) (1987–88)
- Height: 53.4 in (1,356 mm) (1983–86); 53.8 in (1,367 mm) (1987–88)
- Curb weight: 3,050–3,500 lb (1,383–1,588 kg)

For the 1983 model year, Mercury introduced the sixth-generation Cougar. While again derived from the Fox platform underpinnings of the previous generation, the new model line served as the replacement of the Cougar XR-7, as the Cougar reverted to its early 1970s role of a "luxury sports coupe" (again a counterpart of the Ford Thunderbird). Within Mercury, the Cougar was slotted above the Capri and below the two-door Grand Marquis (both would be discontinued during its production).

The 1983 redesign of the Cougar was part of an extensive revision of the Ford and Mercury model ranges. For Mercury, its mid-size sedan range underwent a minor model revision, as the previous Cougar sedan/wagon adopted the Marquis nameplate (with the full-size Grand Marquis becoming a distinct model line for 1983).

Along with its shift in model segment, the sixth-generation Cougar (and the Thunderbird) marked the first large-scale use of aerodynamic-intensive design for an American automobile; the Cougar/Thunderbird were the first Ford vehicles developed using computer-aided design (CAD). While styled with a notchback roofline, the 1983 Cougar was far sleeker than the 1982 Cougar XR7, reducing its coefficient of drag from 0.50 to 0.40 In 1987, the sixth-generation Cougar underwent a mid-cycle revision with additional aerodynamic improvements, reducing its drag coefficient to 0.36.

=== Chassis ===
The sixth-generation Cougar retained the rear-wheel drive Ford Fox platform from the fifth generation. Downsized to a 104-inch wheelbase, the chassis underpinnings were largely unchanged, including a MacPherson strut/A-arm front suspension with a four-link coil-sprung solid rear axle with front and rear anti-roll bars.

As with the previous generation, 14-inch wheels and tires were standard, with Michelin TRX tires and metric-size wheels as an option (shared with the Thunderbird and Capri/Mustang). For 1985, 15-inch wheels became an option for the XR7.

==== Powertrain ====
For its 1983 launch, the sixth-generation Cougar offered a 120 hp 3.8L V6 from its predecessor as a standard engine; a 130 hp 4.9L V8 made its return as an optional engine. For 1986, the V8 was changed to sequential fuel injection, increasing output to 150 hp. For 1988, the 3.8 L V6 was given multiport fuel injection, increasing output to 140 hp; the 4.9 L V8 was retuned to 155 hp.

From 1984 until 1986, the XR7 was equipped with a 2.3 L turbocharged inline-4; shared with the Thunderbird Turbo Coupe, the engine produced 145 hp with an automatic transmission (155 hp with a manual transmission). For 1987, the XR7 dropped the turbocharged engine (and 5-speed manual transmission) in favor of the 4.9 L V8.

The 2.3 L inline-four was paired with a 5-speed manual transmission; a 3-speed automatic transmission was optional. The 3.8 L V6 was paired with a 3-speed automatic; a 4-speed overdrive automatic was optional (the only transmission with the 4.9 L V8). For 1987 and 1988, the 4-speed AOD transmission was fitted to both the 3.8 L and 4.9 L engines.

=== Body ===
==== Exterior ====
The exterior design of the sixth-generation Cougar was designed largely in response to the negative market response to the introduction of the fifth-generation Cougar. While retaining a common chassis, a primary objective for designers was to maximize the visual differentiation between the Thunderbird and Cougar. To reduce production costs, the two model lines shared exterior body parts, including front and rear bumpers, both doors, the windshield, the hood, and front fenders. While the Thunderbird adopted a fastback roofline, the Cougar adopted a notchback roofline with a near-vertical backlight, distinguished by upswept rear side windows.

During its production, the sixth-generation Cougar underwent several exterior revisions. For 1984, the hood ornament was replaced by a flat hood emblem. For 1985, the waterfall-style grille was replaced with an egg-crate design (similar to Mercedes-Benz); the red taillamp lenses were replaced by a dark gray design. 1986 saw few changes, highlighted by the addition center rear brake light (CHMSL) and a power-operated moonroof; for the last time, the Cougar was available with vent windows.

To mark its 20th year of production, the Cougar underwent an extensive mid-cycle revision for 1987. Originally slated for the 1986 model year, nearly every exterior panel was changed. To visually stretch the roofline, a compound-curved rear window replaced the nearly flat rear glass and the rear quarter windows were redesigned (with a curve inversely matching the windshield angle). To further distinguish the model line from the Thunderbird, the 1987 Cougar received its own grille (with a large "cat" emblem), front bumper cover, and aerodynamic composite headlamps. Shared with the Mustang GT, the Cougar received new 15-inch wheels, becoming the standard alloy wheel design for 1988. For 1988, the exterior of the Cougar underwent no changes, introducing several monochromatic paint options.

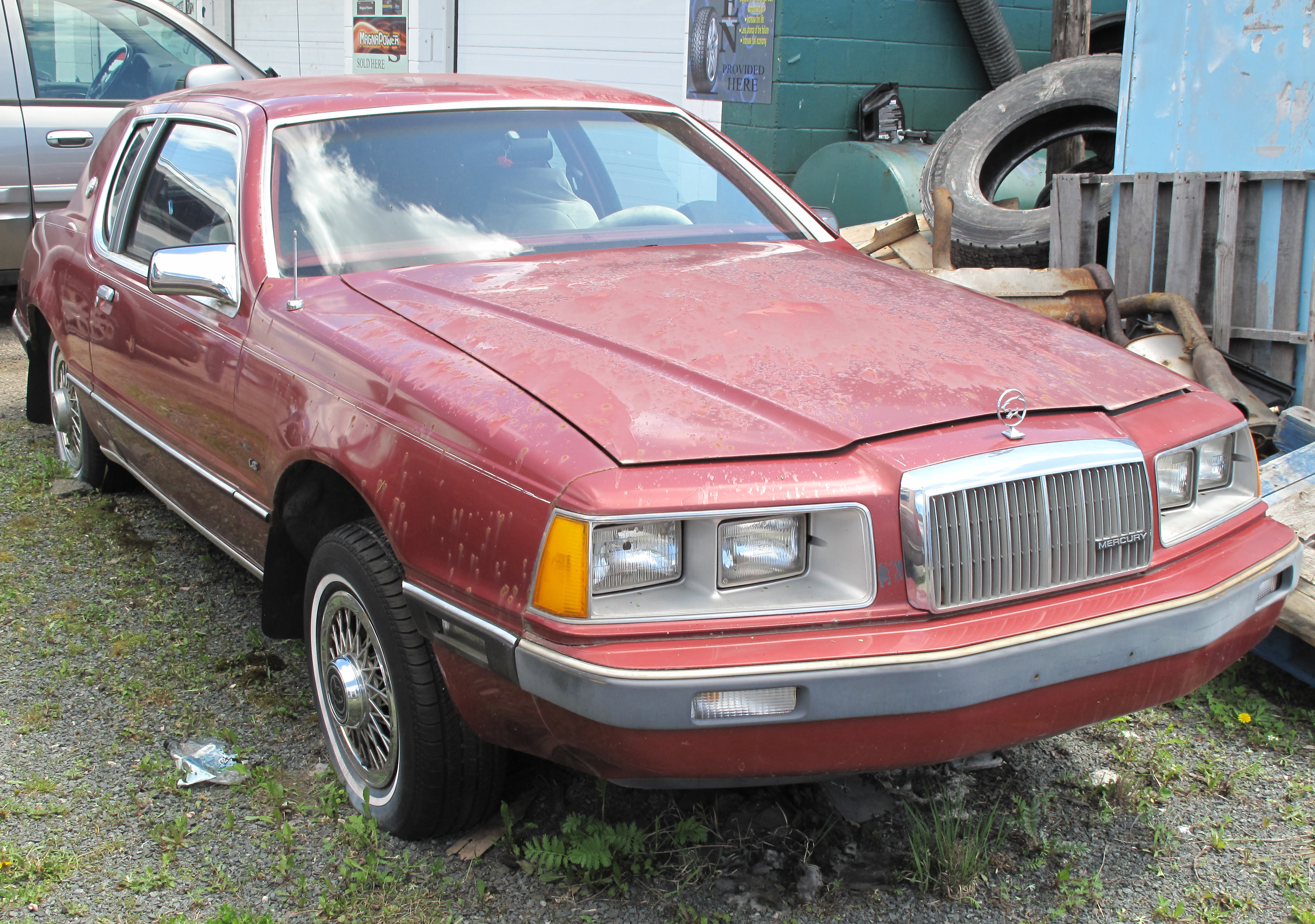
1983 Mercury Cougar LS

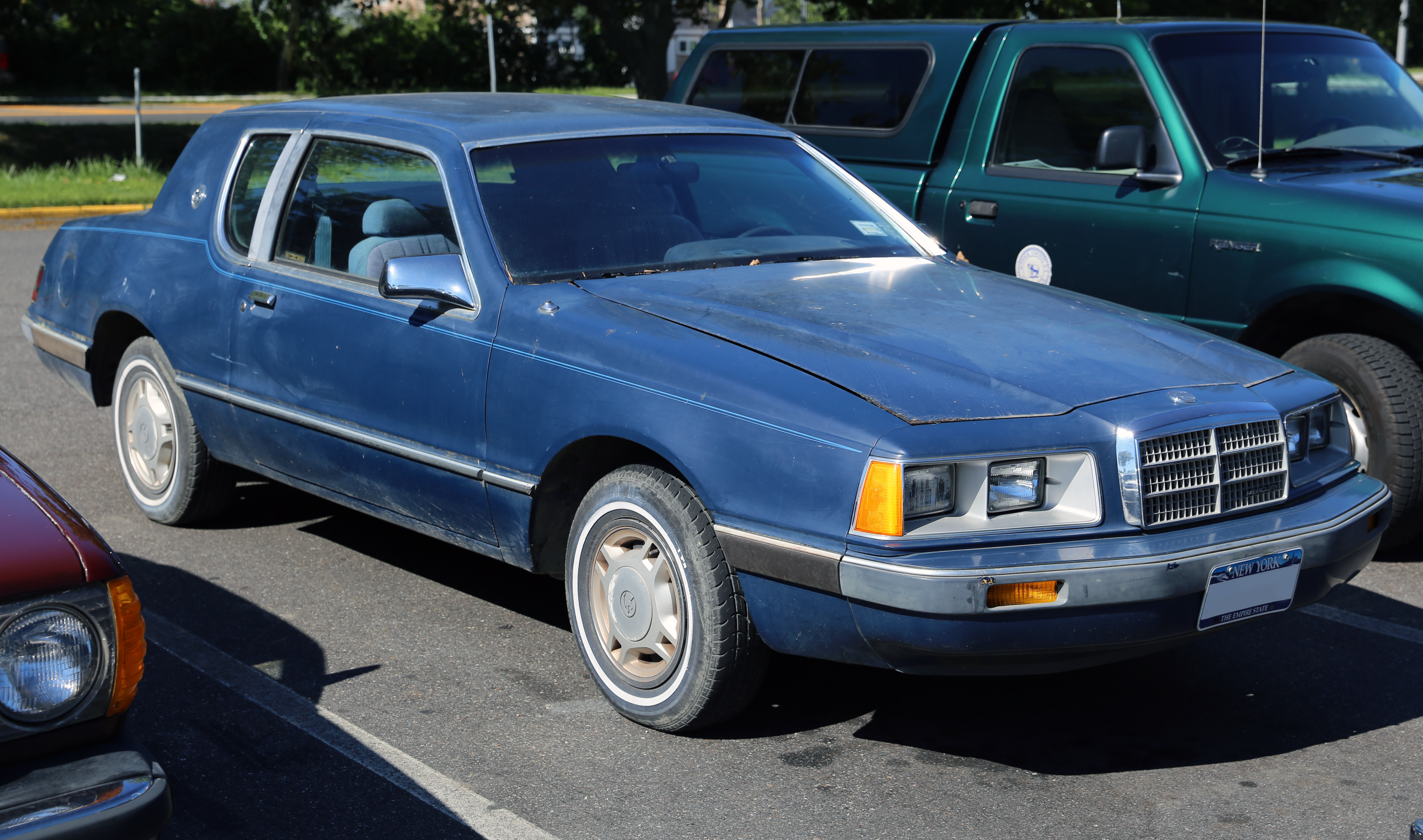
1985 Mercury Cougar LS

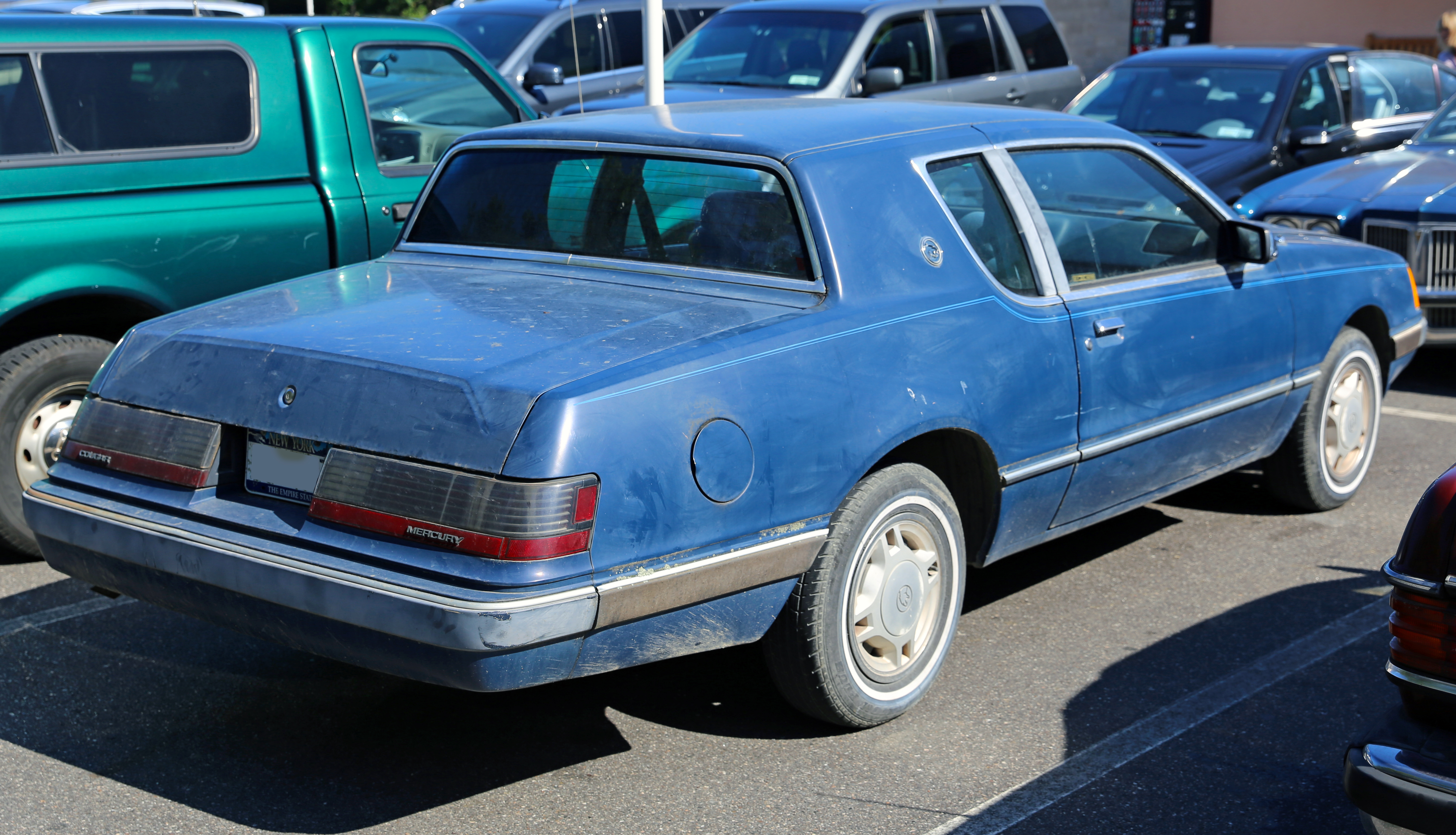
1985 Mercury Cougar LS, rear

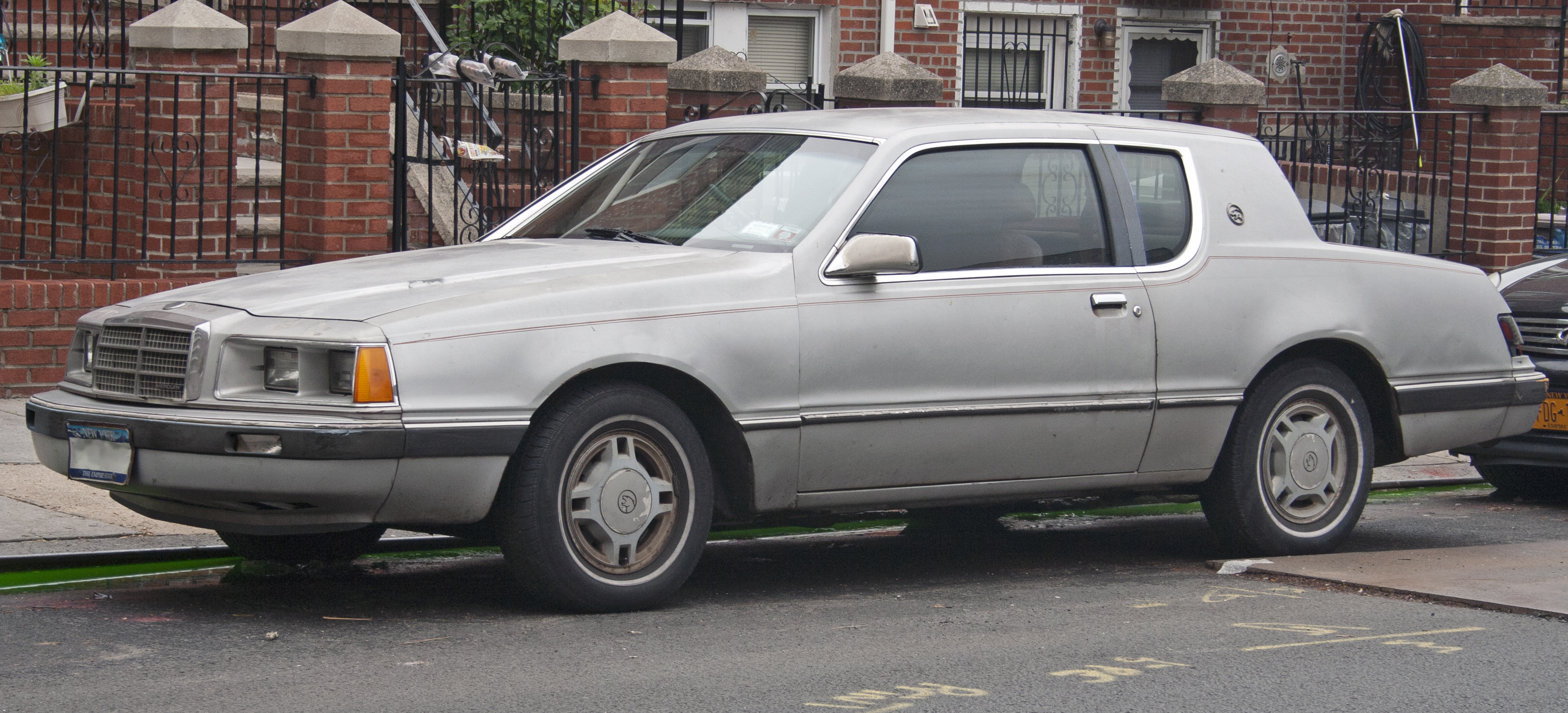
1986 Mercury Cougar LS

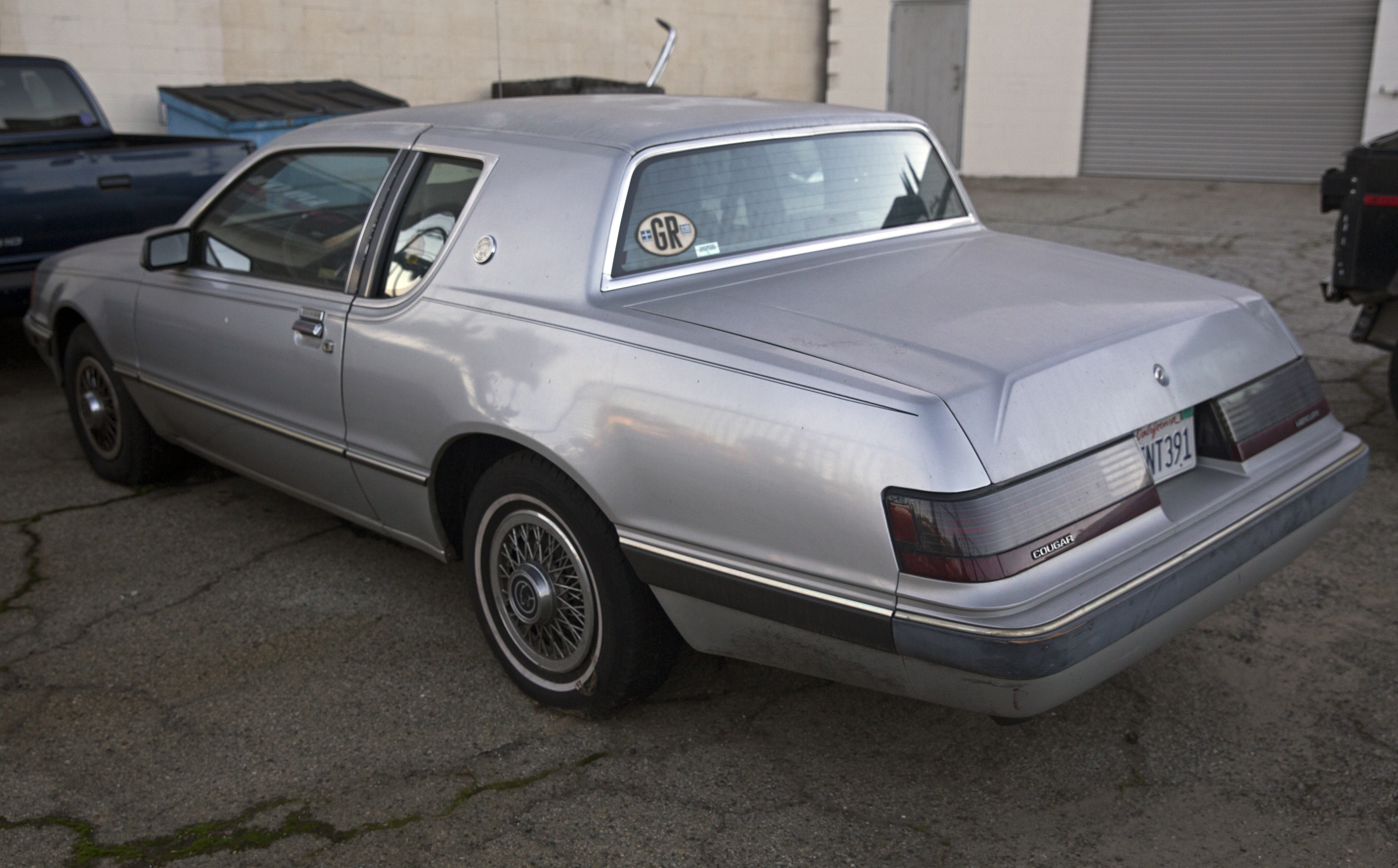
1986 Mercury Cougar

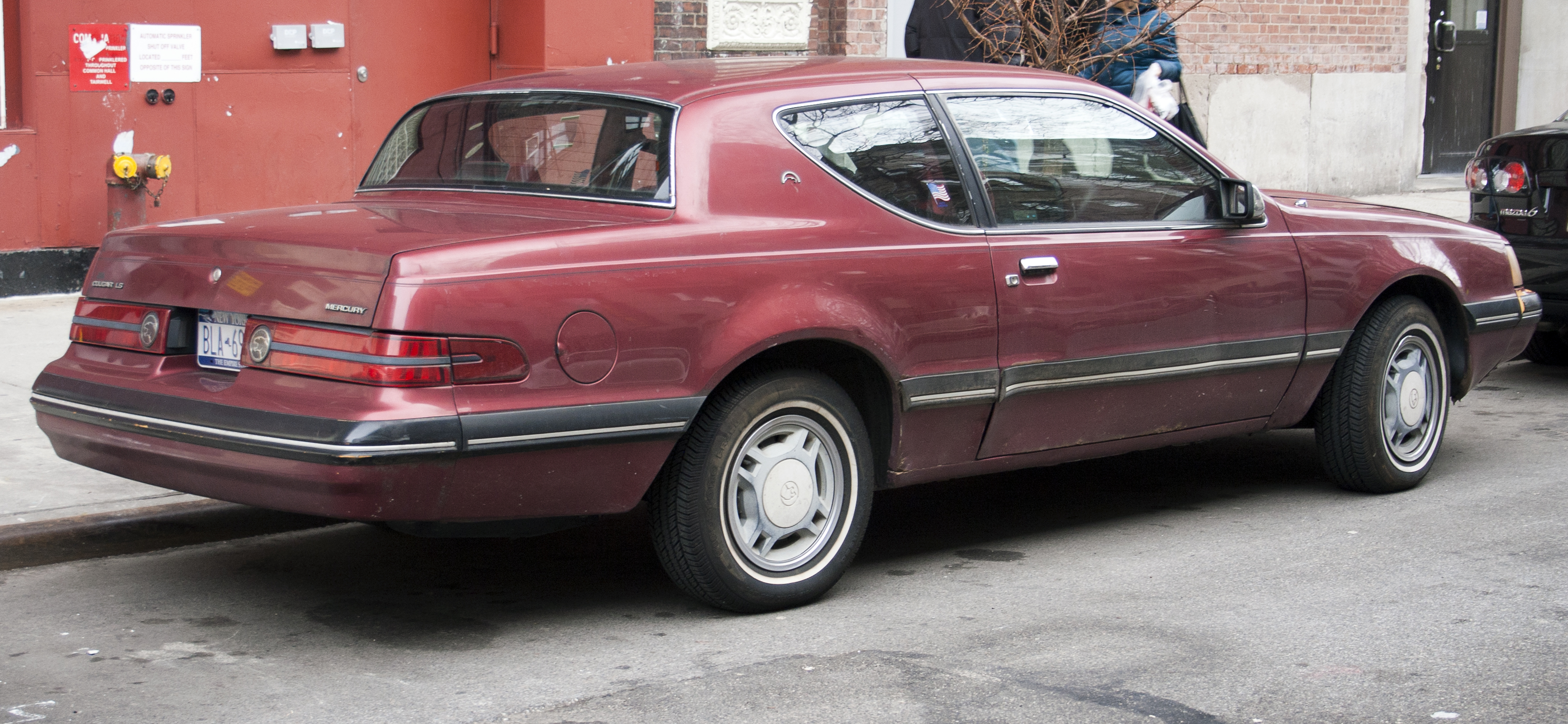
1988 Mercury Cougar LS

==== Interior ====
For its 1983 launch, to lower production costs, the sixth-generation Cougar was required to carry over interior parts from the 1980–1982 Cougar XR7, including a modified dashboard; an analog instrument panel was standard, with a digital instrument panel offered as an option. For 1984, the steering column was redesigned, returning horn control to the steering wheel. As part of the introduction of the XR7, the model introduced an instrument panel including a tachometer and turbocharger boost gauge. For 1985, the interior underwent a complete redesign, with new door panels and dashboard; a redesigned rear seat expanded seating capacity to five passengers (four passengers with full-length console). The standard instrument panel was a digital speedometer with analog secondary gauges; a fully digital instrument panel was optional (the XR7 was given a fully analog instrument panel).

For the 1987 model year, the Cougar saw few changes to its interior, with the XR7 adopting a fully digital dashboard as standard equipment. For 1988, the analog XR7 dashboard made its return; along with the deletion of the boost gauge, the tachometer was revised for a lower-revving V8 engine.

=== Trim ===
The sixth-generation Cougar continued the trim nomenclature of its predecessor in modified form, with the Cougar GS serving as the base trim, the Cougar LS as the luxury trim, and the Cougar XR7 as the high-performance version. The GS trim was largely used for internal purposes, with advertising dropping the designation entirely. For 1987, to move the Cougar upmarket, the Cougar LS became the standard trim level, with both V6 and V8 engines available.

For 1984, the XR7 made its return after a year-long hiatus. Serving as the counterpart of the Thunderbird Turbo Coupe, the XR7 was fitted with a performance-oriented suspension, a turbocharged 2.3 L engine (shared with the Turbo Coupe and Mustang SVO), blacked-out window trim, and full analog instrumentation. In 1987, to better distinguish the Cougar XR7 from the Thunderbird Turbo Coupe, the turbocharged inline-4 was replaced by the 4.9 L (302 cu in) "Windsor 5.0" V8, along with a standard 4-speed automatic.

==== 20th Anniversary ====
For the 1987 model year, Mercury produced the Mercury 20th Anniversary Cougar as a commemorative edition. Derived from the Cougar LS, the 20th Anniversary Cougar was produced in a near-monochromatic exterior (Cabernet Red with Midnight Smoke moldings); the wheels, all badging, and regular chrome trim were finished in 24 karat gold, with a gold-trimmed C-pillar emblem. The trunk was fitted with a (non-functional) luggage rack.

The 20th Anniversary Cougar included the 4.9 L (302 cu in) V8, sport-handling suspension with quad rear shocks (derived from the XR7), and 15-inch alloy wheels (from the Mustang GT, painted gold). Along with a limited-slip rear axle, the only options offered were a power moonroof, power antenna, illuminated entry, keyless entry, automatic climate control, and an engine block heater.

In total, Mercury produced 5,002 20th Anniversary Cougars; 800 were reserved for Canada.

=== Production ===
Model year	Units
1983	75,743
1984	131,190
1985	117,274
1986	135,904
1987	105,847
1988	113,801
Total	679,759

== Seventh generation (1989–1997) ==
Seventh generation
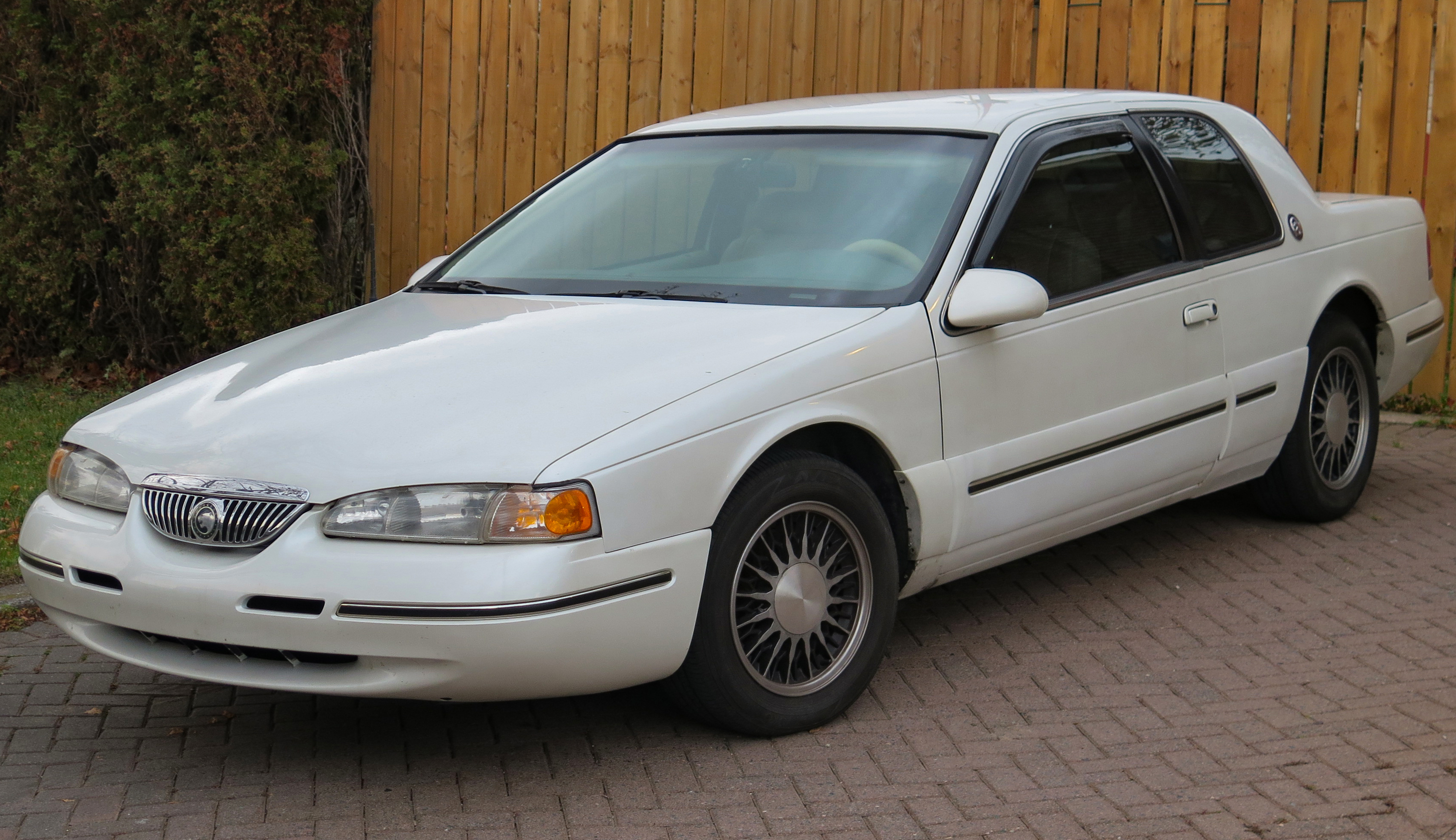
- 1997 Mercury Cougar XR7

Overview
- Also called: Ford Cougar (Mexico)
- Model years: 1989–1997
- Assembly: Lorain, Ohio, United States

Body and chassis
- Body style: 2-door coupe
- Layout: FR layout
- Platform: Ford MN12 platform
- Related: Ford Thunderbird; Lincoln Mark VIII

Powertrain
- Engine: 3.8 L Essex V6 (1989–1997); 4.9 L (302 cu in) Windsor 5.0 V8 (1991–1993); 4.6 L Modular V8 (1994–1997)
- Transmission: Four-speed AOD (1989–1993) or 4R70W automatic Five-speed manual M5R2 (1989–90)

Dimensions
- Wheelbase: 113.0 in (2,870 mm)
- Length: 1989–1991: 198.7 in (5,047 mm); 1992–1994: 199.9 in (5,077 mm); 1995–1997: 200.3 in (5,088 mm)
- Width: 1989–1994: 72.7 in (1,847 mm); 1995–1997: 73.1 in (1,857 mm)
- Height: 1989–1991: 52.7 in (1,339 mm); 1992–1997: 52.5 in (1,334 mm)
- Curb weight: 3528 lb (1600 kg) with V6; 3666 lb (1663 kg) with V8

On December 26, 1988, the seventh-generation Mercury Cougar was introduced for the 1989 model year. Development began during the second quarter of 1984 along with the tenth-generation Ford Thunderbird; the $2 billion redesign of the two vehicles included benchmarking handling characteristics against luxury coupes such as the BMW 6-Series, Mercedes-Benz 560SEC, and Jaguar XJS while still targeting the same price point as their predecessors. During the development of the 1989 Cougar, the form factor of coupes shifted in the marketplace.

In its debut year of 1989, there were 97,246 Cougars produced, making it the best model year for the flagship coupe. As the 1990s progressed, market demand shifted away from large two-door coupes and the Cougar became the sole such model offered by the division. After a final-year production run of 35,267 units, the seventh generation of Cougar was discontinued, with the final example produced in late August of 1997.

=== Chassis ===
The seventh-generation Mercury Cougar is built upon the Ford MN12 platform. Designed specifically for the Mercury Cougar and Ford Thunderbird, the MN12 chassis retained the use of rear-wheel drive. While its exterior footprint changed negligibly, in a major change, the wheelbase was expanded nine inches to 113 inches (longer than a Mercedes-Benz 560SEC).

Centered around the design of the MN12 chassis was its use of four-wheel independent suspension in place of a live rear axle. With the exception of the Chevrolet Corvette, the Ford MN12 chassis marked its first use in a mass-produced front-engine rear-drive American automobile. In front, the Mercury Cougar was configured with a short/long-arm wishbone suspension. As an option, the Cougar was available with 4-wheel anti-lock disc brakes (standard on the Cougar XR7).

As part of the 1989 redesign, the MN12 chassis was powered solely by a 3.8 L V6, as the lowered hoodline of the MN12 was too low to fit the 4.9 L (302 cu in) V8 making it the first time a V8 was not available in the Cougar or Thunderbird. LS-trim Cougars were offered with a naturally aspirated 140 hp (104 kW; 142 PS) version of the V6, while the XR7 was powered by a 210 hp (157 kW; 213 PS) supercharged version (serving as the replacement for the turbocharged 2.3 L inline-4). The naturally aspirated V6 was paired with a 4-speed automatic transmission, while the supercharged V6 was offered with a 5-speed manual (with the automatic as an option).

For 1991, a 200 hp (149 kW) version of the 4.9 L (302 cu in) Windsor 5.0 was introduced featuring a redesigned intake manifold to allow sufficient underhood clearance for the engine to be installed. Offered as an option on the Cougar LS, the V8 replaced the supercharged V6 in the XR7 (which also marked the end of the 5-speed manual in the MN12 Cougar). Originally slated for 1993, the 1994 Cougar shifted from the overhead-valve 302 cu in (4.9 L) V8 to a 205 hp (153 kW; 208 PS) 4.6 L SOHC V8 (shared with the Mercury Grand Marquis). In another 1994 change, the 4R70W electronically controlled version of the AOD 4-speed automatic was introduced for both the V6 and V8 engines.

=== Body ===
As the sixth-generation Mercury Cougar had proved successful in the marketplace, the 1989 redesign of the Cougar was largely an evolution of the previous generation, with updates of many previous design elements. The upright notchback roofline underwent a major revision, with the controversial upswept quarter windows of the previous generation abandoned. While proportioned differently, wraparound headlamps and taillamps were modeled similarly to those of the Mercury Sable. As a result of the longer wheelbase, the rear overhang was shortened. During the development of MN12, Ford designers sought to develop increased differentiation between the Cougar and Thunderbird. While fenders and doors are common between the two vehicles, in comparison to the 1983–1987 generation, fewer visible parts are shared.

As part of the shift to the wider MN12 chassis, the Cougar again became a 5-passenger vehicle (for the first time since 1982). As a result of the wider interior, all Cougars were fitted with a center console with a floor-mounted shifter. In following with the previous generation, LS-trim Cougars were fitted with digital instrumentation; the Cougar XR7 was fitted with an analog instrument panel. Originally slated to be launched with dual airbags, cost overruns and market demand necessitated the use of automatic seatbelts to meet passive-restraint requirements. For 1994, the interior underwent a complete redesign (similar to the Lincoln Mark VIII), with dual airbags replacing the automatic seatbelts. For 1997, the Cougar received a new instrument panel (similar to the Taurus/Sable), with cupholders added to the center console; several items were removed as part of de-contenting, including the courtesy lamps, underhood light, and a glove box light.

During its production, the seventh-generation Mercury Cougar underwent several revisions. For 1991, the Cougar underwent a slight facelift, with new headlamps, taillamps, and front bumper; the facelift is distinguished by a smaller grille (1989–1990 versions extend above the headlamps). For 1994, a second facelift saw a revision of the grille, taillamps, and a simplification of the side molding. The interior was also revised at this time and now included dual airbags with a wraparound style interior. For 1996, the Cougar received a major restyling sharing its entire front fascia with the Ford Thunderbird except for the front bumper cover and grille. The bodysides received wide body-colored cladding.

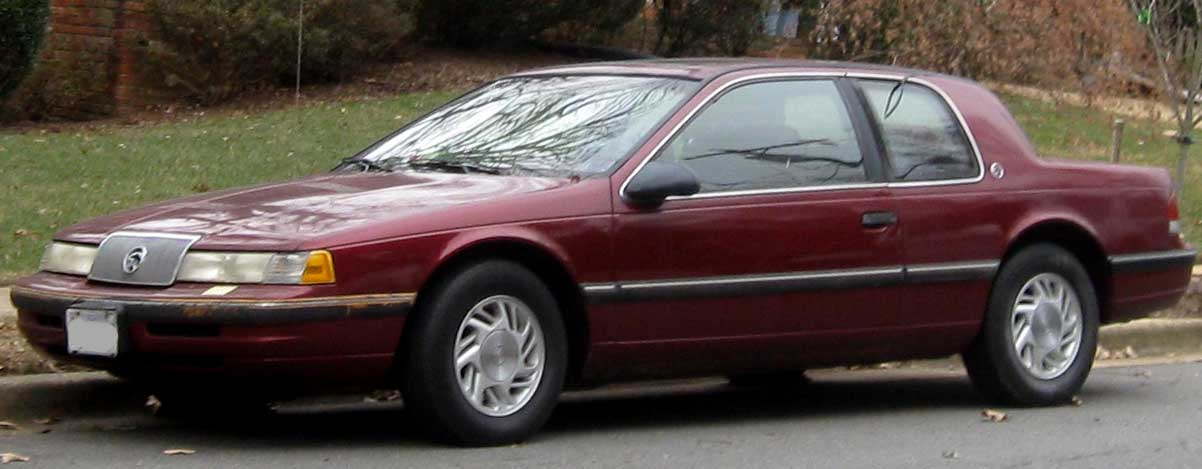
1989–1990 Mercury Cougar LS

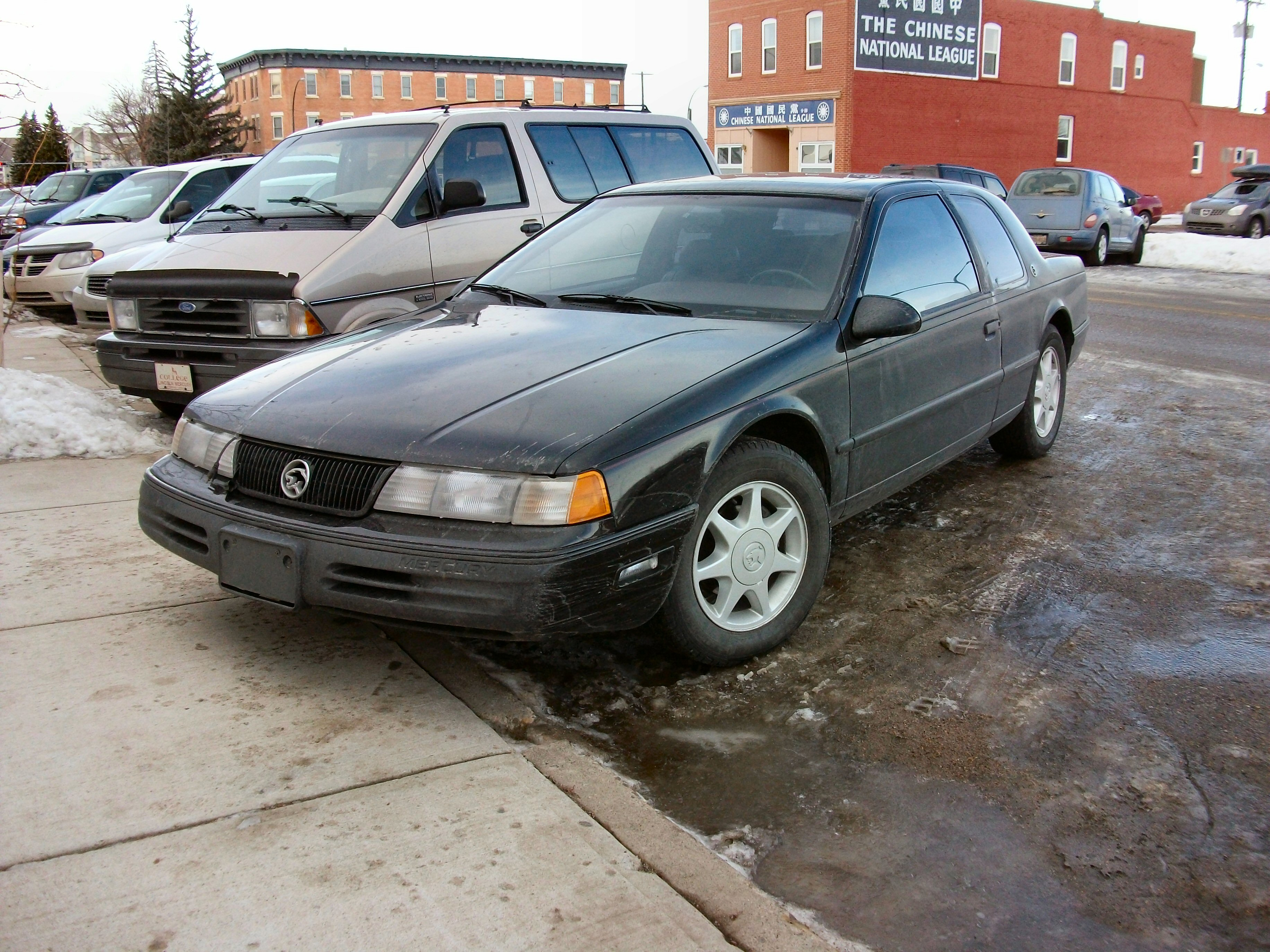
1991 Mercury Cougar XR7

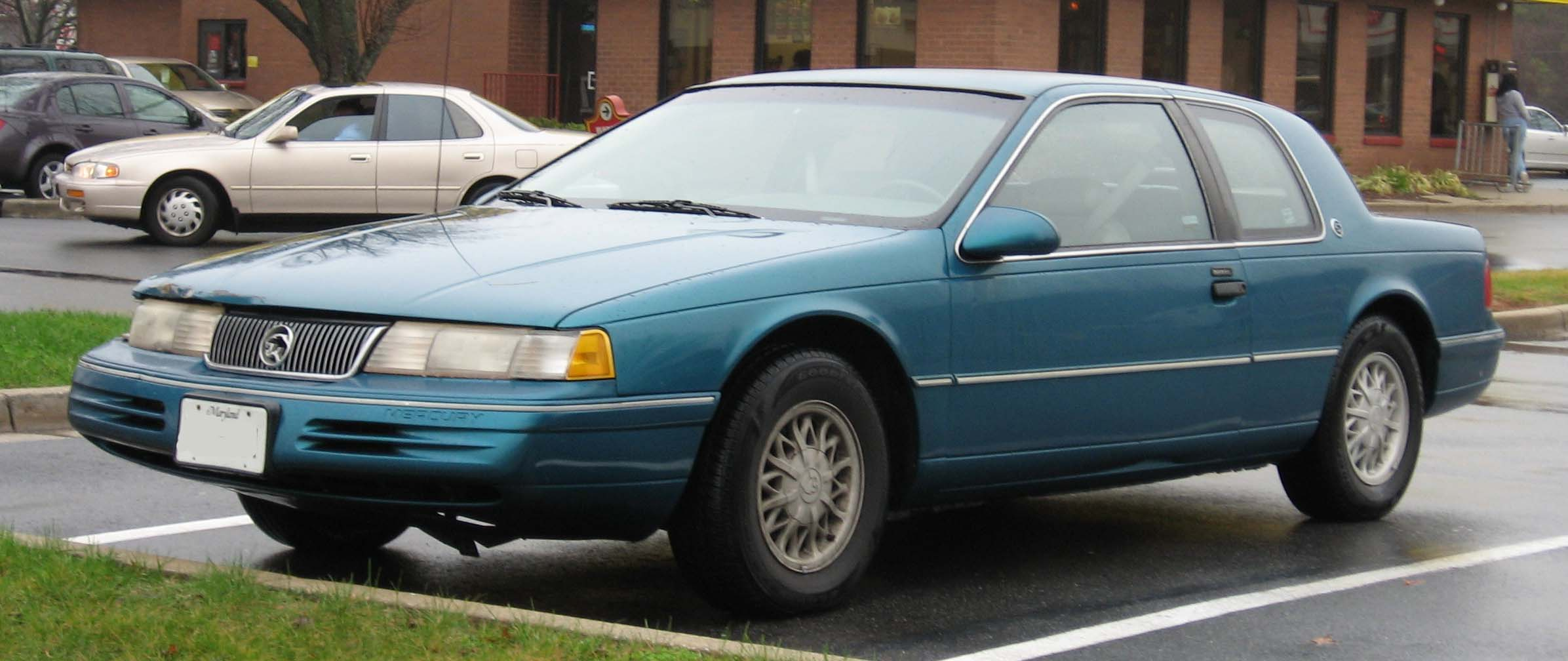
1993 Mercury Cougar XR7

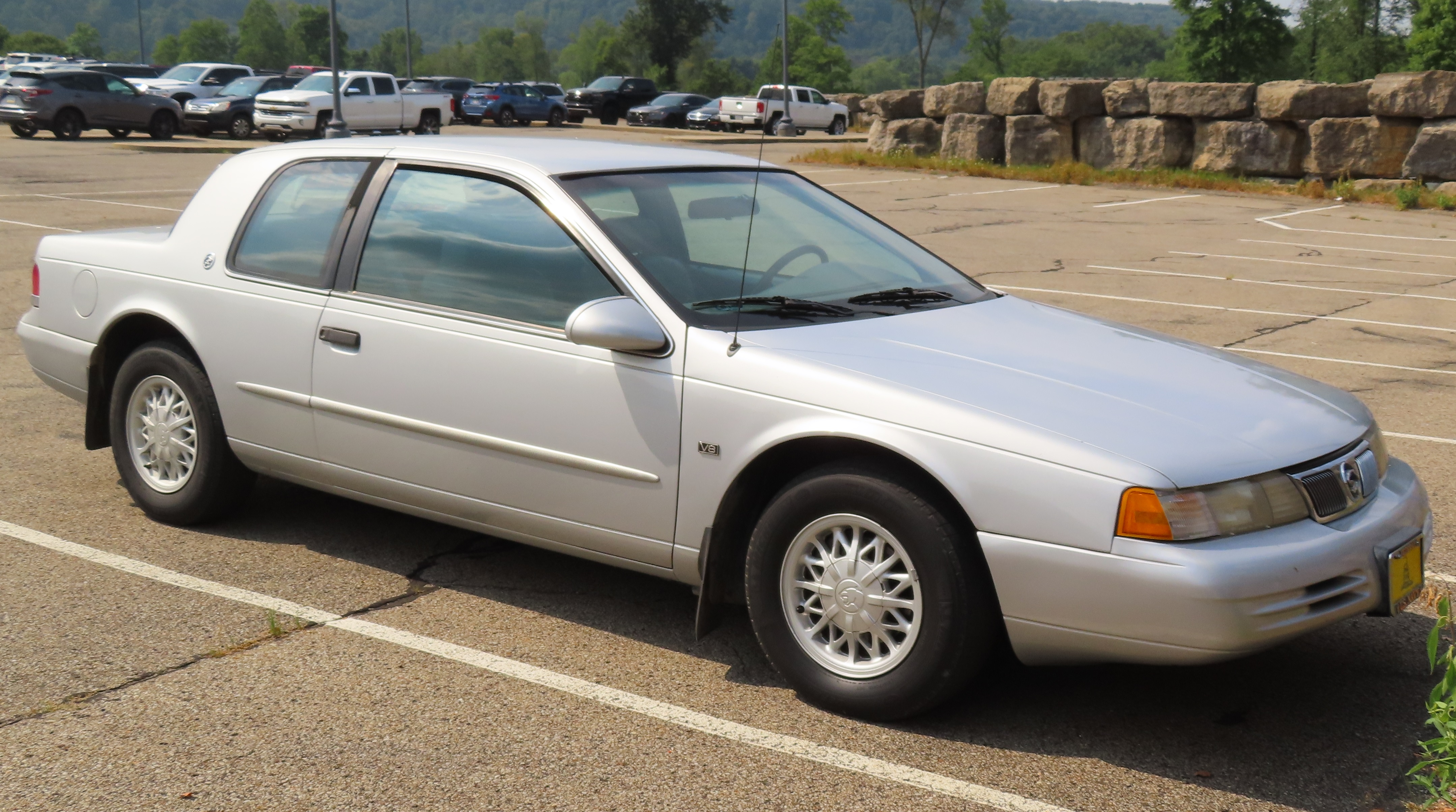
1995 Mercury Cougar XR7

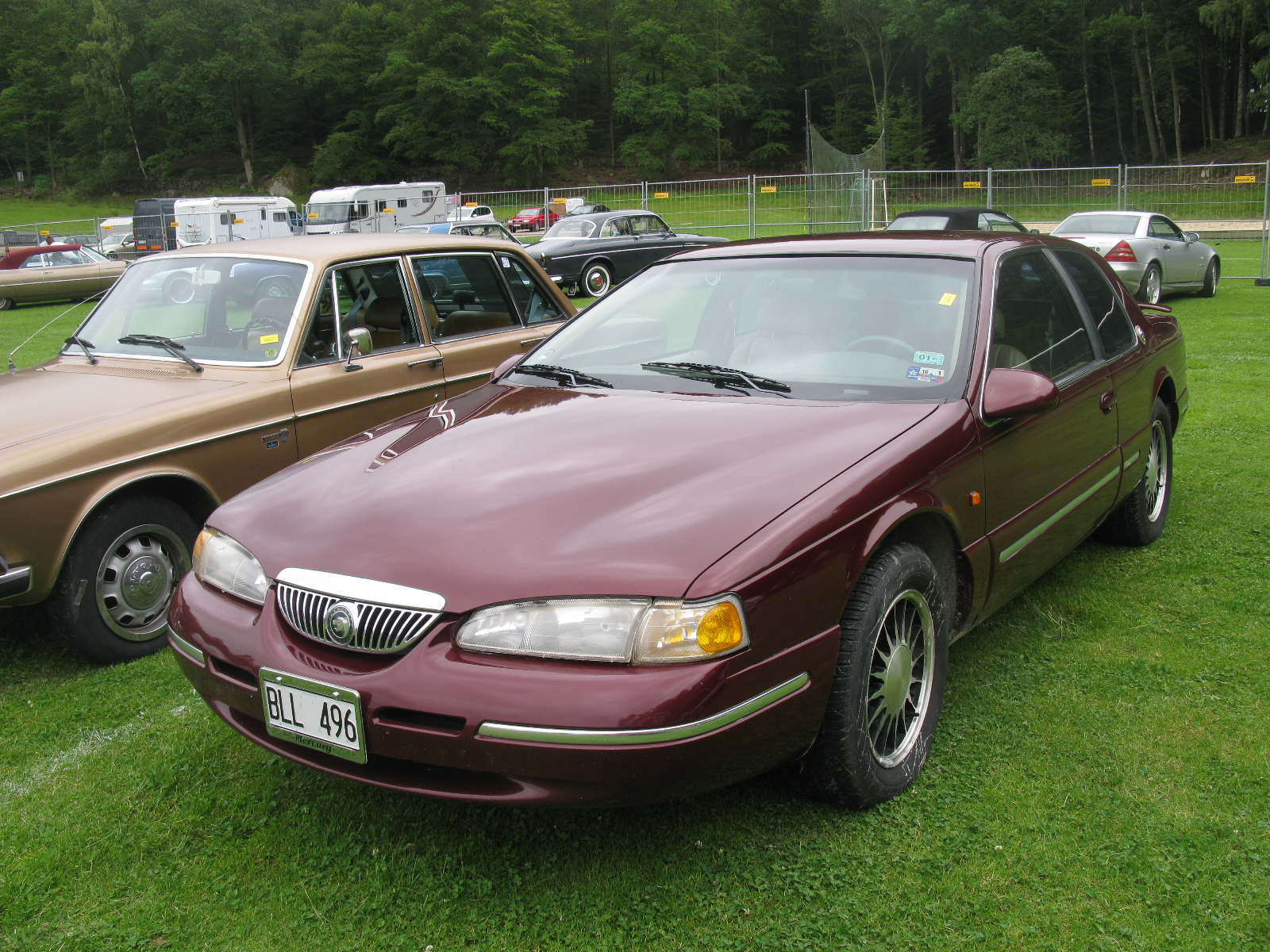
1997 Mercury Cougar 30th Anniversary Edition

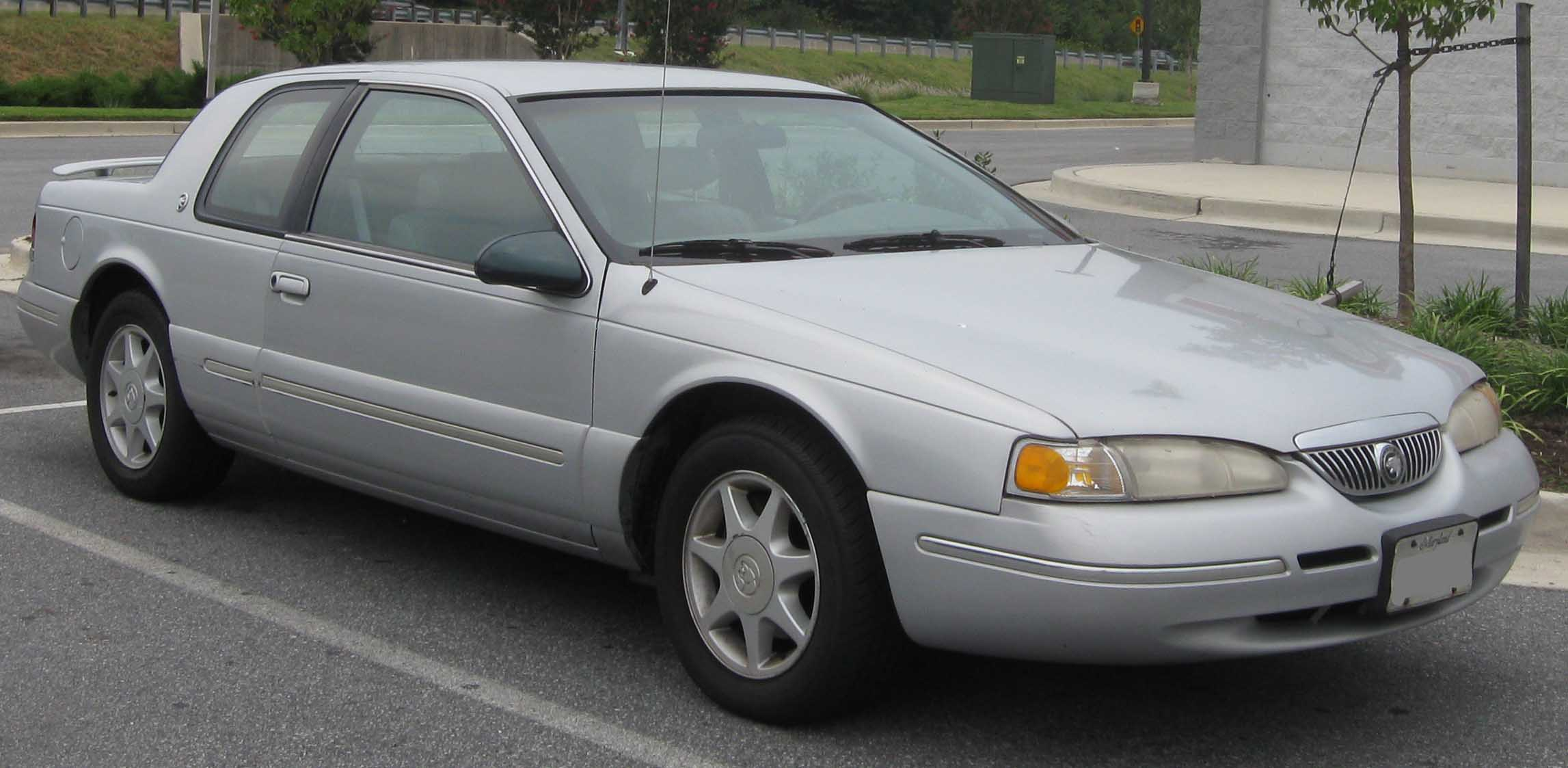
1997 Mercury Cougar XR7 Sport

=== Trim ===
At its launch, the seventh-generation Mercury Cougar retained the same model trims as before, with the LS geared towards luxury and convenience features and the XR7 geared towards performance and handling. Externally, the LS was given chrome window trim while the XR7 was nearly monochromatic with black window trim. To optimize its handling capabilities, the XR7 was fitted with many model-specific features. In addition to the 210 hp (157 kW; 213 PS) supercharged V6 (replaced by a 5.0 L V8 in 1991), the XR7 featured four-wheel antilock disc brakes, electronically adjustable handling suspension, 16-inch alloy wheels, and a 5-speed manual transmission. To differentiate the XR7 from the LS, the model was fitted with sport seats, two-spoke sport steering wheel, and full analog instrumentation.

For 1993, Mercury revised the Cougar model line, with the XR7 becoming the sole trim level, dropping the LS and the monochromatic sport-oriented XR7 (eliminating some overlap with the Ford Thunderbird). Adapting much of the equipment of the previous LS, the 1993 XR7 adapted chrome exterior trim and a standard digital instrument cluster, with four-wheel disc brakes becoming an option. In contrast to the previous LS, the 1993 XR7 offered both V6 and V8 engines.

Alongside the LS and both versions of the XR7, several limited editions of the Cougar were produced. To commemorate the 25th anniversary of the Mercury Cougar, in 1992, the 25th Anniversary package was an option (nearly exclusively on XR7 models). Equipped with 15-inch BBS alloy wheels, all examples were painted green with a tan interior and green carpet. Other features included a model-specific trunk lid and C-pillar badging and an imitation trunk lid luggage rack. To commemorate the 30th anniversary of the Mercury Cougar, for 1997, Mercury produced a 30th Anniversary Mercury Cougar XR7 as an option package. Distinguished by its use of Lincoln Mark VIII wheels, the 30th Anniversary Cougar featured model-specific C-pillar emblems, embroidered seat and floormat emblems; the option also included commemorative items shipped to the owner. Approximately 5,000 25th anniversary and 5,000 30th anniversary Cougars were produced.

=== Safety ===
NHTSA crash test ratings (1997):

- Frontal Crash Test – Driver:
- Frontal Crash Test – Passenger:
- Side Impact Rating – Driver:
- Side Impact Rating – Rear Passenger:
- Rollover Rating: Not rated

=== Production ===
Model year	Units
1989	97,246
1990	76,467
1991	60,564
1992	46,928
1993	79,700
1994	71,026
1995	60,201
1996	38,929
1997	35,267
Total	566,328

== Eighth generation (1999–2002) ==
Eighth generation
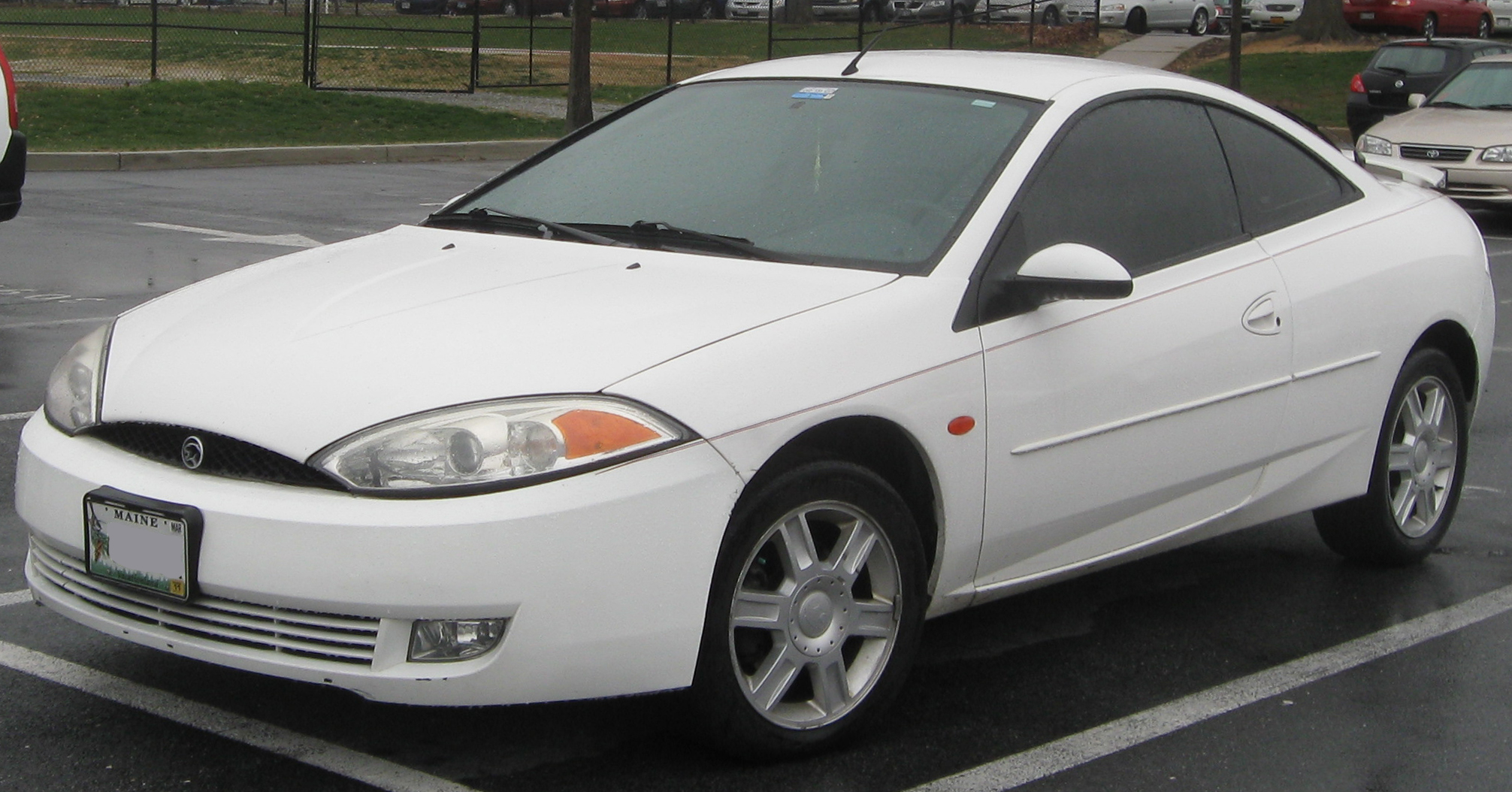
- 2001–2002 Mercury Cougar

Overview
- Also called: Ford Cougar (Export)
- Production: 1998 – 9 August 2002
- Model years: 1999–2002
- Assembly: Flat Rock, Michigan, United States
- Designer: Darrell Behmer

Body and chassis
- Class: Sport compact
- Body style: 3-door liftback coupe
- Layout: Transverse front-engine, front-wheel drive
- Platform: Ford CDW27 platform
- Related: Ford Mondeo; Ford Cougar; Ford Contour / Mercury Mystique

Powertrain
- Engine: 2.0 L Zetec I4 (gasoline); 2.5 L Duratec V6 (gasoline)
- Transmission: 5-speed MTX-75 manual; 4-speed CD4E automatic

Dimensions
- Wheelbase: 106.4 in (2,703 mm)
- Length: 185.0 in (4,699 mm)
- Width: 69.6 in (1,768 mm)
- Height: 52.2 in (1,326 mm)
- Curb weight: 2,892 lb (1,312 kg)

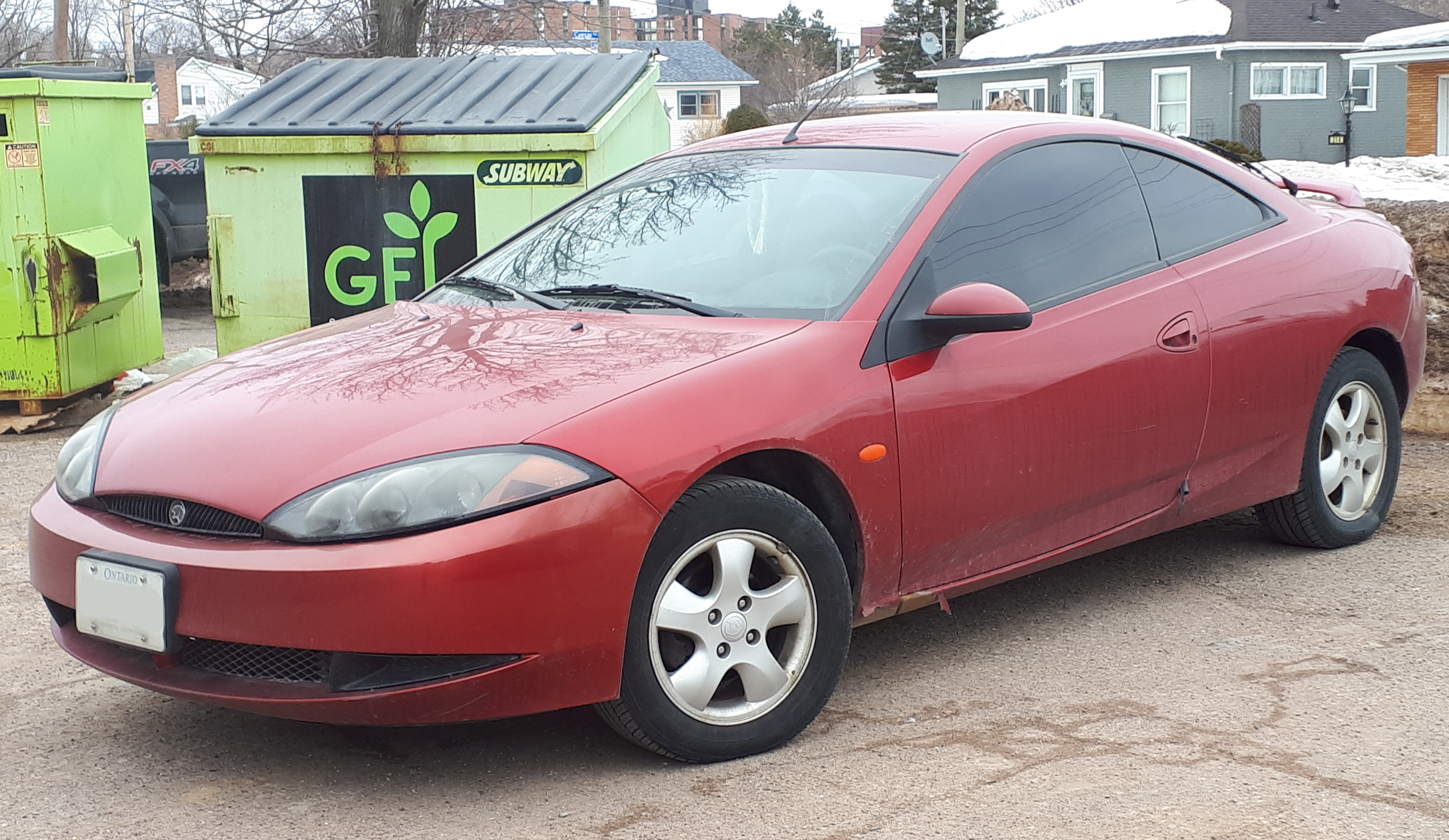
1999–2000 Mercury Cougar

By the mid-1990s, Ford engineers had completed design work on the third generation of the Ford Probe. Intended for a 1998 model year launch, the new Probe shifted its design from the Mazda MX-6 to a platform shared with the Ford Contour and Mercury Mystique. At the end of the 1997 model year, Ford announced a major streamlining of its coupe offerings, with Ford discontinuing the Thunderbird and Probe; Lincoln-Mercury lost the Cougar and Lincoln Mark VIII (the latter, after 1998). To make room for the updated 1999 Ford Mustang and all-new Ford Escort ZX2, the Contour-based Ford Probe continued into production, with Ford shifting the vehicle to the Lincoln-Mercury Division to adopt the Mercury Cougar name.

After skipping the 1998 model year, Mercury introduced the eighth-generation Mercury Cougar for the 1999 model year at the 1998 Los Angeles Auto Show. Serving as the replacement for the Ford Probe, the first front-wheel drive Cougar shifted market segments from two-door personal luxury coupe to three-door sport compact, introducing the first Mercury sport hatchback coupe since the 1986 Mercury Capri.

While marketed in Europe and Australia under the Ford brand, the eighth-generation Mercury Cougar was the first Mercury car since the 1991–1994 Mercury Capri sold without a direct Ford model equivalent in North America.

Initially outranking its predecessor in sales, the eighth-generation Cougar (marketed towards younger buyers, similar to the ZX2) struggled to compete for sales against sedans (the Mercury Sable and Grand Marquis) in the Mercury model line. While coupes had traditionally been offered in Lincoln-Mercury dealerships for several decades, the shift of the Cougar to the sports compact segment presented a challenge to sales personnel acquainted with marketing luxury-segment vehicles to new-car buyers along with attracting younger buyers into Mercury showrooms.

In 2002, Ford announced another restructuring of its model line, with 2002 marking the final year for the Cougar, Mercury Villager, Lincoln Continental, and Ford Escort. The Ford Contour/Mercury Mystique (Ford Mondeo MkII) ended production in 2000, with the Cougar outliving it by two model years. As part of the model line revision, the Ford Mondeo platform was no longer used in North America until its consolidation with the 2013 Ford Fusion; the Mercury Cougar was effectively left without a donor platform.

The last Mercury Cougar rolled off the assembly line on 9 August 2002; following the end of its production, the Mercury model line offered no cars with four-cylinder engines until the 2006 Mercury Milan.

=== Chassis ===
The 1999 Cougar shared the Ford CDW27 world-car platform introduced by the Ford Contour/Mercury Mystique. The first front-wheel drive Cougar was designed with a fully independent multilink suspension.

The 1999–2002 Cougars were available with two engine options, the 2.0 L Zetec straight-4 engine with 125 hp (93 kW; 127 PS), and the 2.5 L Duratec V6 with 170 hp (127 kW; 172 PS). Also, two transaxle options were available: the manual Ford MTX-75 transmission or the automatic Ford CD4E transmission (available in the US with either engine, although the I4/automatic combination was extremely rare; supposedly only 500 Cougars were built with the I4/auto).

"Sport Package" models of the V6 featured four-wheel vented disc brakes (from the Contour SVT), 16-inch alloy wheels, fog lights, and the speed governor raised, not removed; contrary to popular belief. While this was considered attainable given enough road, the automatic transmission version could not reach this speed without significant engine modification. However, the manual transmission version of the car, when given enough road, was capable of reaching speeds of around 145. Without the sport package, the speed governor was set at 115 mph (185 km/h) due to the H-rated tires with which the car was equipped.

Ford also prepared two high-performance concept-only versions; one dubbed the "Eliminator", which was a supercharged version built with aftermarket available parts, and the other the "Cougar S", which featured new bodywork, all-wheel drive, and a 3.0 L Duratec engine.

A high-performance Cougar S (not to be confused with the concept) was discussed in the press, which was essentially a Cougar with a Contour SVT engine; however, this version never made it into production. It was also to be sold in Europe as the Ford Cougar ST200.

=== Body ===
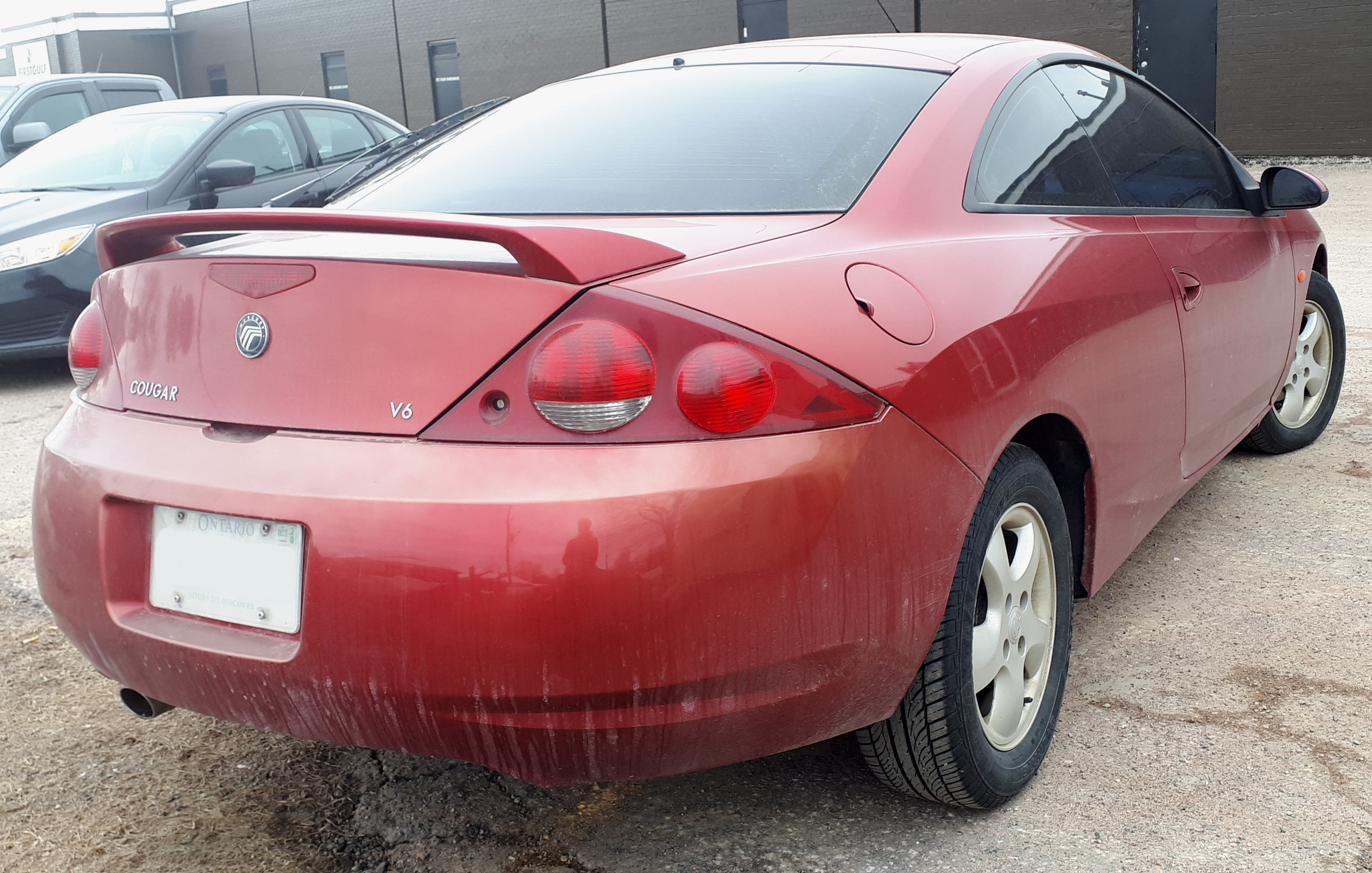
2000 Mercury Cougar rear

This generation of Cougar featured a DOHC 24-valve six-cylinder Duratec engines, a fully independent multilink suspension, and front-wheel drive. This was also the first hatchback Cougar, and the first to have its own body, unshared by any Ford (except its European twin Ford Cougar). The body design used a philosophy Ford marketed as "New Edge" design: a combination of organic upper body lines with sharp, concave creases in the lower areas. The Cougar's body, and the New Edge idea in general, was introduced as a concept called the Mercury MC2 in 1997 and was considered a bigger version of the European Ford Puma.

Ford also sold this generation of Cougar in Europe and Australia as the Ford Cougar.

There were several paint and trim packages:

- Special Edition (2000 model year) available in Zinc Yellow, leather interior with yellow stitching on the seats
- C2 (2001–2002 model years) available in either French Blue, Silver Frost, or Vibrant White, along with special blue interior accents.
- Zn (2001 model year) available with special Zinc Yellow, special Visteon hood scoop, and spoiler.
- XR (2002 model year) available in either Black or XR Racing Red, with special black and red seats and interior trim, also came with 17-inch silver wheels with black accents on the inner spokes.
- 35th Anniversary (2002 model year) versions were available in Laser Red, French Blue, Satin Silver, and Black; most came with leather interiors with silver center sections on the seats. They also came with 17-inch machined wheels, the same as the XRs without the black paint on the center spokes.
- Roush Edition (1999–2000 model years) Available mostly in white and silver color choices, this car was built under the Roush name with bodywork to the front bumper, back, side skirts, and more. A total of 112 were made during its two-year production.

For the 2001 model year, the Cougar was updated with new headlights, front and rear fascias, and updated interior trim.

=== US production numbers ===
Model year	Units
1999	88,288
2000	44,935
2001	25,044
2002	18,321

=== Safety ===
The Insurance Institute for Highway Safety (IIHS) never evaluated the 1999–2002, Mercury Cougar. However they did evaluate the 1995–2000 Ford Contour/Mercury Mystique, which is structurally similar to the Cougar, both being built on the Ford CDW27 world-car platform, which was given a "Poor" overall rating in the frontal moderate overlap crash test by the IIHS.

While being similar the Cougar had many of its body panels, braces and other structural floor pieces modified to fit the new body shape, allegedly the Cougar is 17% stiffer than the Contour/Mystique, stronger in side impacts due to its side crash beams and, tests suggest that in a side impact, passengers could be up to three times safer in a Cougar than in some other competitors.

The Cougars complete safety suite includes:

- Second Generation Dual Frontal SRS Airbags
- Front occupant side-impact head/chest outboard seat Airbags (optional)
- 3-point safety belt with Emergency Locking Retractor (ELR) and Automatic Locking Retractor (ALR) in all seat positions
- Side impact door beams
- Reinforced high strength alloy steel front and side structures
- Four-channel Anti-lock Brakes with Electronic Brake Distribution (EBD) (optional)
- All-Speed Traction Control (optional)

National Highway Traffic Safety Administration (NHTSA) Crash Test Ratings for the 1999–2002 model year (coupe):

- Frontal Driver:
- Frontal Passenger:
- Side Driver (with side airbags):
- Side Driver (without side airbags):
- Side Rear Passenger:

=== Ford Cougar (Export) ===
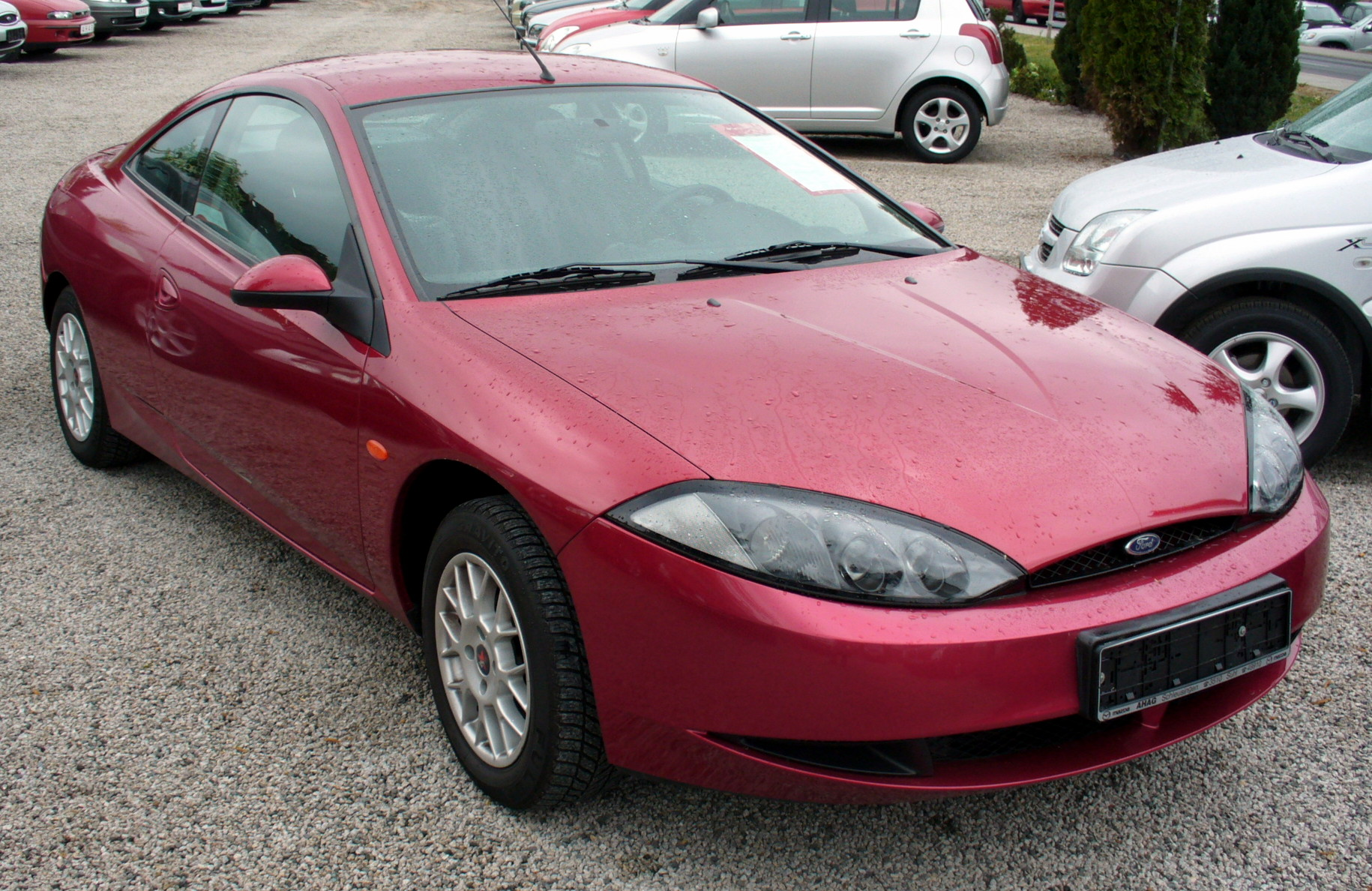
Export Ford Cougar

In 1998, Ford launched the Cougar at the 1998 British Grand Prix at Silverstone. Without the Mercury brand in Europe and Australia, Ford marketed the Cougar as the Ford Cougar through Ford of Europe and Ford of Australia from 1999 to 2002. Replacing the Ford Probe in European markets, the Ford Cougar was manufactured in the United States. Slotted above the Ford Ka and Ford Puma (both based on the Ford Fiesta subcompact), the Cougar was marketed as a mid-sized coupe.

Except for Ford Blue Oval badging replacing Cougar emblems on the exterior and interior, both Ford and Mercury versions are essentially identical. Export Cougars also have clear marker light lenses (in place of amber) and amber rear turn signals. In the United States, the Ford Cougar was built in both left and right-hand drive, with the latter allowing for its sale in the UK and Australia.

== Racing ==
In 1967, NASCAR race car builder, Bud Moore, campaigned Mercury Cougars in the Trans-Am Series with Ford Motor Company factory support. The team featured drivers Dan Gurney, Parnelli Jones, Peter Revson, David Pearson, and Ed Leslie. Factory support ended towards the end of the season and the Cougars began to show their wear. Ultimately, Mercury lost the championship to Ford by two points.

In 1968, Bud Moore took his Cougars NASCAR racing in the newly formed Grand American series. Driver Tiny Lund dominated the series and took the championship. After the Cougar changed to the Thunderbird platform in 1974, the body style was raced in NASCAR. The Wood Brothers Racing team with David Pearson and later Neil Bonnett was successful with the car and scored several victories until the body style became ineligible following the 1980 season. The next year (1981) saw the previous Cougar teams switch to the Thunderbird when NASCAR mandated the smaller (110-inch-wheelbase) cars, though oddly the Thunderbirds had to have their wheelbases extended 6 in (152 mm) because the actual wheelbase of production cars was 104 in (2,642 mm).

From 1989 through 1990, Lincoln-Mercury Motorsport fielded Cougars of the new body style in the GTO class of the IMSA GT Championship. The cars won the championship in both years and made the teams' total of seven manufacturer championships.

== Appearances ==
Product placement in movies include a red 1969 XR7 convertible driven by Diana Rigg in her role as Tracy Bond in the 1969 James Bond film On Her Majesty's Secret Service.
