= Duncan Dayton =

American racing driver (born 1959)

Duncan Dayton (born April 28, 1959 in Minneapolis, Minnesota) is an entrepreneur, former racing driver and racing team owner. Dayton raced in various formula racing and sportscar racing series. Currently, Dayton is the owner of Highcroft Racing.

== Racing career ==
Grand Prix de Monaco Historique
| Year | Car | Finish |
|---|---|---|
| 1997 | Lola Mk4 | 1st |
| 2000 | Brabham BT11 | 1st |
| 2002 | Lotus 16 | 1st |
| 2004 | Brabham BT11 | 1st |
| 2006 | Brabham BT33 | 1st |
| 2008 | Brabham BT33 | 1st |
| 2010 | Brabham BT33 | 1st |
| 2012 | Brabham BT33 | 1st |
| 2014 | Brabham BT33 | 2nd |
| 2016 | Brabham BT33 | 1st |

Dayton started racing in Formula Continental in 1990. The Minnesota born driver made his debut in the SCCA sanctioned American Continental Championship in 1994. Throughout his F2000 career, Dayton made a record breaking 53 race starts between 1994 and 1998, a record broken in 2004 by Scott Rubenzer. The 1997 season was his most successful. The driver won his only race during the Desert Star Classic weekend at Phoenix International Raceway. With another two podium finishes Dayton placed his Highcroft Racing entered Van Diemen in third place in the championship. For 1998, Dayton returned for the full 1998 season in a Bowman BC5 with only one top ten finish.

== Highcroft Racing ==
Dayton founded Highcroft Racing as a team to compete and maintain historic racing cars. Dayton won the first Historic Grand Prix of Monaco in a Climax powered Lola Mk4. Dayton won the race again in 2000, in a Brabham BT11. He later won the race in 2002 and 2004. He won a total of ten Monaco Grand Prix in different historic classes between 1997 and 2010.

In 2006, Dayton expanded into the American Le Mans Series entering a MG-Lola EX257. The owner/driver competed at the 2006 12 Hours of Sebring with Gregor Fisken and Rick Knoop. The team did not finish after a mechanical failure. The team competed the full 2006 American Le Mans Series season with a third place at Petit Le Mans as highlight.

In 2012, Dayton, and Highcroft Racing, stepped into the Nissan-NISMO backed DeltaWing project.

== Personal life ==
Dayton is a graduate of Connecticut College and the Harvard Graduate School of Design. While at Connecticut College Duncan, and his brother Judson, put forward the idea of putting an icehockey rink on campus. The building was possible, in part, of donations through his family's trust.

=== Family ===
Dayton was born to a wealthy and philanthropic family. His father, Ken Dayton, was the director of the Dayton-Hudson Corporation. His great-grandfather, George Dayton, was the founder of the company that would evolve into Target Corporation. First cousin of Duncan Dayton is Mark Dayton, a former Governor of Minnesota.

== Motorsports results ==
=== American Open-Wheel racing results ===
(key) (Races in bold indicate pole position, races in italics indicate fastest race lap)

==== American Continental Championship results ====
| Year | Entrant | 1 | 2 | 3 | 4 | 5 | 6 | 7 | Pos | Points |
|---|---|---|---|---|---|---|---|---|---|---|
| 1994 | | MOS1; 4 | WGI; 15 | IOW; 17 | TRR; 14 | MOS2; 6 | ROA | DAL | | |

==== USAC FF2000 National Championship results ====
| Year | Entrant | 1 | 2 | 3 | 4 | 5 | 6 | 7 | 8 | 9 | 10 | Pos | Points |
|---|---|---|---|---|---|---|---|---|---|---|---|---|---|
| 1994 | | IRP1; 41 | IRP2; DNS | IRP3; 18 | WGI | BFR | TOP | NHS | SHA1 | SHA2 | LRP; 16 | | |

==== USF2000 National Championship ====
| Year | Entrant | 1 | 2 | 3 | 4 | 5 | 6 | 7 | 8 | 9 | 10 | 11 | 12 | 13 | 14 | Pos | Points |
|---|---|---|---|---|---|---|---|---|---|---|---|---|---|---|---|---|---|
| 1995 | | PIR1; 7 | PIR2; 6 | IRP; 3 | RIR; 7 | WGI; 14 | MOH1; 8 | NHS; 7 | ATL1; 12 | ATL2; DNS | MOH1 | | | | | 7th | ??? |
| 1996 | | WDW; 17 | STP; 27 | PIR; 12 | DSC1; 15 | MOS; 10 | IRP; 10 | RIR; DNQ | WGI1; 7 | WGI2; 2 | MOH; 37 | NHS; 9 | LVS; 8 | | | 9th | ??? |
| 1997 | Highcroft Racing | WDW; 4 | STP; 12 | PIR; 2 | DSC1; 1 | **DSC2**; 5 | SAV; 36 | PPI; 29 | CHA1; 20 | CHA2; 9 | MOH; 5 | WGI; 17 | WGI; 3 | | | 3rd | 162 |
| 1998 | Highcroft Racing | WDW; 23 | PIR; 33 | HMS1; 11 | HMS2; 14 | WGI; 30 | WGI; 6 | MOH1; 25 | MIN; 18 | CHA1; 21 | CHA2; 25 | MOH2; 44 | ATL; 28 | PPI; 12 | PPI; 11 | 23rd | 89 |
