= Chris Simmons (racing driver) =

American racing driver (born 1973)

- Born: May 1, 1973 (age 53) Hartford, Connecticut, U.S.
- Retired: 1998
- Relatives: Jeff Simmons (brother)

Indy Lights
- Years active: 1995–1998
- Teams: Sotare Motorsports (1995); Team Green (1996–1997); Mattco Raceworks (1998)
- Starts: 37
- Wins: 0
- Poles: 2
- Fastest laps: 1
- Best finish: 5th in 1997

Previous series
- 1992–1994 1990–1991 1990 1980–1990: USAC Formula Ford 2000 East; SCCA S2000; Skip Barber Formula Ford; Quarter midgets

Championship titles
- 1992, 1993 1991: USAC Formula Ford 2000 East; SCCA S2000 Northeast

Awards
- 1991: SCCA Jim Fitzgerald National Rookie of the Year

Chris Simmons (born May 1, 1973) is an American Chip Ganassi Racing engineer for their IndyCar Series teams.

== Racing career ==
Simmons was born in Hartford, Connecticut and started as a driver, initially racing quarter midgets in the north eastern United States. He started his first quarter midget race at the age of seven. After attending the Spenard-David racing school he started auto racing in 1990. The driver from Connecticut started out in the SCCA S2000 Northeast Division championship. Simmons won the 1991 championship after winning five out of seven races. Simmons also won the SCCA National Championship Runoffs in his class at Road Atlanta in 1991. The drove his Lola T598 from the pole position to the win. He won with advantage of more than eight seconds over Paul O'Kean.

After his success in S2000 Simmons graduated into the USAC Formula Ford 2000 East championship for 1992. In 1992 Simmons won three out of seven races in his Van Diemen RF92. After winning the championship Chris Simmons returned in the series for the 1993 season. He again won the championship after winning nine races. He ran a limited race schedule in 1994 as he started his mechanical engineering study at the University of Pennsylvania. Simmons won one race in the Formula Ford 2000, at New Hampshire International Speedway. Simmons was also involved in a deadly midget crash. During the USAC Hoosier Invitational X at the Hoosier Dome his car crashed into the pit area. One person got killed, eight others were injured. Simmons was uninjured.

For 1995 Simmons again ran a limited schedule due to college obligations. In 1995 he graduated in mechanical engineering and management & technology at the University of Pennsylvania. Simmons made his debut in 1995 in the Indy Lights. At Bicentennial Park in Miami the young driver started 22nd and finished fourteenth. Simmons returned to the series full-time for 1996 to race for Team Green. He scored his best result at the start of the championship. At Homestead-Miami Speedway Simmons finished second, behind David Empringham. Simmons eventually ended up tenth in the championship standings. The 1997 was more successful for the driver from Connecticut. Simmons scored two pole positions, at Nazareth Speedway, Gateway Motorsports Park. He scored another three podium finishes. At the end of the season Simmons was classified fifth in the championship standings. A violent crash at Nazareth disrupted his 1998 season. In a crash at turn four Simmons was injured and transported to Easton Hospital. At the hospital, it was determined that Simmons suffered a severe neck strain and a bruised shoulder. Former teammate at Team Green, Mark Hotchkis replaced Simmons at Nazareth and the following three rounds. Simmons returned to the series at Portland International Raceway where he finished fourteenth. At the end of the season Simmons scored 32 points and was placed nineteenth in the championship.

After not being able to secure a race seat for 1999, Simmons moved into the mechanical side of the sport. His brother Jeff Simmons had been racing through the ranks in previous years. After winning Chris joined his brother in the Barber Dodge Pro Series for 1999 as his engineer. Jeff Simmons won the championship and graduated into Indy Lights in 2000. Chris was again his engineer at Team Green. Simmons would remain at Andretti Autosport while his brother moved on to other teams. Simmons was an assistant engineer to Tony Kanaan and Paul Tracy. At Chip Ganassi Racing since 2003, he has been part of the team's rapid success, initially on the No. 10 team with three of Dario Franchitti's series titles and an Indianapolis 500 win in 2012, then staying with Tony Kanaan on the No. 10, but since 2015 has been with Scott Dixon for two more titles with the No. 9 team (2015 and 2018), which he is lead engineer.

== Racing record ==
=== SCCA National Championship Runoffs ===
| Year | Track | Car | Engine | Class | Finish | Start | Status |
|---|---|---|---|---|---|---|---|
| 1991 | Road Atlanta | Lola T598 | Ford | S2000 | 1 | 1 | Running |

=== American open-wheel racing results ===
(key) (Races in bold indicate pole position) (Races in italics indicate fastest lap)

==== American Continental Championship results ====
| Year | Entrant | 1 | 2 | 3 | 4 | 5 | 6 | 7 | 8 | Pos | Points |
|---|---|---|---|---|---|---|---|---|---|---|---|
| 1992 | | FIR | MOS | IOW | **WGI**; 8 | LRP | TRR | SON1 | SON2 | ??? | ??? |
| 1993 | | **ROA**; 11 | MOS; 1 | SON | IOW | **WGI**; 1 | **TRR**; 9 | DAL | | **4th** | ??? |

==== USAC FF2000 Eastern Division Championship ====
| Year | Entrant | 1 | 2 | 3 | 4 | 5 | 6 | 7 | 8 | 9 | Pos | Points |
|---|---|---|---|---|---|---|---|---|---|---|---|---|
| 1992 | SOTARE Racing | ROA1; 7 | IRP; 2 | **NAZ**; 1 | SHA; 2 | WGI; 1 | TOP; 9 | ROA2; 12 | SEB; 1 | | **1st** | ??? |
| 1993 | SOTARE Racing | **ATL**; 1 | IRP; 17 | **WGI**; 19 | MOH; 1 | **RAM**; 1 | NHS; 1 | **SHA1**; 1 | **SHA2**; 1 | **LRP**; 1 | **1st** | ??? |

==== USAC FF2000 National Championship results ====
| Year | Entrant | 1 | 2 | 3 | 4 | 5 | 6 | 7 | 8 | 9 | 10 | Pos | Points |
|---|---|---|---|---|---|---|---|---|---|---|---|---|---|
| 1994 | | IRP1 | IRP2 | IRP3 | WGI | BFR | TOP | **NHS**; 1 | SHA1 | SHA2 | LRP | ??? | ??? |

==== Indy Lights ====
| Year | Team | 1 | 2 | 3 | 4 | 5 | 6 | 7 | 8 | 9 | 10 | 11 | 12 | 13 | 14 | Rank | Points |
|---|---|---|---|---|---|---|---|---|---|---|---|---|---|---|---|---|---|
| 1995 | Sotare Motorsports | MIA; 14 | PHX; DNS | LBH | NAZ | MIL | DET | POR | TOR | CLE | NHA | VAN | LS | | | **N.C.** | **0** |
| 1996 | Team Green | MIA; 2 | LBH; Ret | NAZ; 4 | MIS; 12 | MIL; 5 | DET; 7 | POR; Ret | CLE; 11 | TOR; Ret | TRO; Ret | VAN; 7 | LS; 12 | | | **10th** | **54** |
| 1997 | Team Green | MIA; 3 | LBH; 4 | **NAZ**; 2 | SAV; 16 | **STL**; 5 | MIL; 17 | DET; 8 | POR; 13 | TOR; Ret | TRO; 15 | VAN; 4 | LS; Ret | FON; 2 | | **5th** | **88** |
| 1998 | Mattco Raceworks | MIA; 5 | LBH; Ret | NAZ; Inj | STL | MIL | DET | POR; 14 | CLE; 15 | TOR; 3 | MIS; 10 | TRO; 8 | VAN; Ret | LS; 13 | FON; 14 | **19th** | **32** |
