= 1994 USAC FF2000 National Championship =

Car racing competition

The 1994 USAC FF2000 National Championship was the first USF2000 national championship sanctioned by the United States Auto Club. It was the final season of USF2000 racing sanctioned by USAC. The following season would be sanctioned by SCCA Pro Racing. Clay Collier, racing with Ruyle Race Service, won the championship.

== Race calendar and results ==
Round	Circuit	Location	Date	Pole position	Fastest lap	Winner
1	Indianapolis Raceway Park	(United States) Brownsburg, Indiana	May 13	(United States) Lance Norick		(United Kingdom) Jonathan Clues
2	Indianapolis Raceway Park	(United States) Bakersfield, California	May 13	(United States) Clay Collier		(United States) Mike Andersen
3	Indianapolis Raceway Park	(United States) Brownsburg, Indiana	May 28	(United States) Clay Collier		(United States) Anthony Lazzaro
4	Watkins Glen International	(United States) Watkins Glen, New York	June 25	(United States) Clay Collier		(United States) Clay Collier
5	Blackhawk Farms Raceway	(United States) South Beloit, Illinois	July 24	(United States) Clay Collier		(United Kingdom) Jonathan Clues
6	Heartland Park Topeka	(United States) Topeka, Kansas	July 30	(United Kingdom) Jonathan Clues		(United States) Clay Collier
7	New Hampshire Motor Speedway	(United States) Loudon, New Hampshire	August 20	(United States) Chris Simmons		(United States) Chris Simmons
8	Shannonville Motorsport Park	(Canada) Shannonville, Ontario	September 10	(United States) Clay Collier		(United States) Aaron Hsu
9	Shannonville Motorsport Park	(Canada) Shannonville, Ontario	September 11	(United States) Clay Collier		(United States) Clay Collier
10	Lime Rock Park	(United States) Lakeville, Connecticut	October 15	(United States) Howard Katz		(United States) Mike Andersen

== Drivers' Championship ==
Color	Result
Gold	Winner
Silver	2nd place
Bronze	3rd place
Green	4th & 5th place
Light Blue	6th–10th place
Dark Blue	11th place or lower
Purple	Did not finish
Red	Did not qualify (DNQ)
Brown	Withdrawn (Wth)
Black	Disqualified (DSQ)
White	Did not start (DNS)
Blank	Did not participate (DNP)
Blank	Driver replacement (Rpl)
Blank	Injured (Inj)
Blank	No race held (NH)

Pos	Driver	IRP		500	WGL	BFR	TOP	NHS	SHA		LRP	Points
1	(United States) Clay Collier	3	30	2	1	2	1	2	23	1	4	148
2	(United Kingdom) Jonathan Clues	1	DSQ	9	4	1	2	3	2	2	5	142
3	(United States) Mike Andersen	4	1	13	3	21	3	6	21	4	1	114
4	(United States) Jeret Schroeder	5	6	11	41	5	6	27	7	9	2	88
5	(United States) Kevin West	36	2	4	6	9	8	31	4	3		88
6	(United States) Aaron Hsu	7	21	6	40	7	17	5	1	19	9	75
7	(United States) Lance Norick	2	DSQ	8	2	17	4	30	14	5	DNF	75
8	(United States) Jeff Beck	13	18	22		4	7		6	7		50
9	(United States) T.J. Dersch	40	20	5	42	6	5	26	24	8		49
10	(United States) Scott Rubenzer	6	33		9	14	11		3	14		47
	(United States) Joe Apuzzo	29	14		22			15			13	
	(United States) Tony Ave					24						
	(United States) Dale Ballinger			DNQ								
	(United States) Beaux Barfield				5							
	(United States) Frank Bernstein	16	DNF		15			11	8	12	6	
	(United States) John Brumder	14	4									
	(United States) Jim Bryant	DNF	DNS	28								
	(United States) Tony Buffomante	21	34		13							
	(United States) David Burkett	10	15	7	14	10	10					
	(United States) Fabio Castellani		23			22						
	(United States) John Calcott	35	8	DNS	28	13	15	10	16		25	
	(United States) Richard Clark							28			10	
	(United States) Matt Connolly	30	DNF	24	16							
	(United States) Paul Corazzo										15	
	(United States) Paul R. Corazzo										7	
	(United States) Rick Costin			15								
	(United States) Duncan Dayton	41	DNS	16							16	
	(United States) Joaquin DeSoto										11	
	(United States) Steve Djelebian								12	13	20	
	(United States) Chris Fahan				8						DNF	
	(United States) Danny Faucetta	37	5	10								
	(United States) Michael Fitzgerald	12	10	27	35						23	
	(United States) Paul Francis								20	23		
	(United States) George Frazier										27	
	(United States) Ken Gerhardt	8	3			28						
	(United States) John Goss			DNQ	27				17	15		
	(United States) Jim Guthrie			17								
	(United States) David Hall							32				
	(Canada) Rick Hayward								11	18		
	(United States) Steve Hickham	9	7	DNQ								
	(United States) Trevor Hilliar										8	
	(United States) Don Hills, Jr.							18				
	(United States) John Hogdal	11	24	20								
	(United States) Howie Idelson				31							
	(United States) Ron Ignatowski	20	16	19	37	23		13	18	17	DNF	
	(United States) Matt Karzen					15						
	(United States) Howard Katz			12							21	
	(United States) R.R. Kelsch	DNF	DNS									
	(United States) Steve Keister				18			7	5	16	3	
	(United States) Bob Layman	17	9	16		29						
	(United States) Anthony Lazzaro			1								
	(United States) Dennis Macchio				12			12	10	24		
	(United States) Allen May	39	DNS	3	7	30						
	(United States) Ian McKechnie				32							
	(United States) Robert Melanson									11		
	(United States) Tom Miggliaccio	28	26					17			17	
	(United States) Chris Miles			DNQ								
	(United States) Dale Moore	26	32	21								
	(Canada) Jacek Mucha	15	12		36	20	12		9	10	DNF	
	(United States) Brooks O'Brien		25									
	(United States) Gary Page					27						
	(United States) Chris Oddo	25	11	14	17							
	(United States) Reed Palmer						13					
	(United States) Jim Parsons						19					
	(United States) Mark Peller	23	13	23	29							
	(United States) John Penna	DNF	DNS									
	(United States) David Porter				10			25			26	
	(France) Ugo Provencher								27	20		
	(United States) Dan Pyanowski	24	22		20			14	22	25		
	(United States) Ed Rich				30			29				
	(United States) John Rutherford, IV	34	28	DNQ								
	(United States) Dan Seledic			26								
	(United States) Chris Simmons							1				
	(United States) Bill Slowik							24				
	(United States) Stephen Sorbaro							22			19	
	(United States) Steve Steeneck							20			14	
	(United States) Gary Swanander			DNQ	21			8	26			
	(Romania) Otmar Szafnauer	22	19		26	18		19	26			
	(United States) Steve Thomson					16						
	(United States) Craig Taylor					25						
	(United States) Richard Taylor				11	26		16			12	
	(United States) Larry Vatri	32	DNS	25				4	25	28		
	(United States) Rob Voska					11						
	(United States) Marty Walter						18					
	(United States) Keith Williams						9					
	(United States) Brad Wright				19				15	21	18	
	(United States) Rich Zober				25	12						

== Externatl links ==
- The 1994 Night before the 5000 FF2000 race on Youtube.
