= Tony Buffomante =

American racing driver

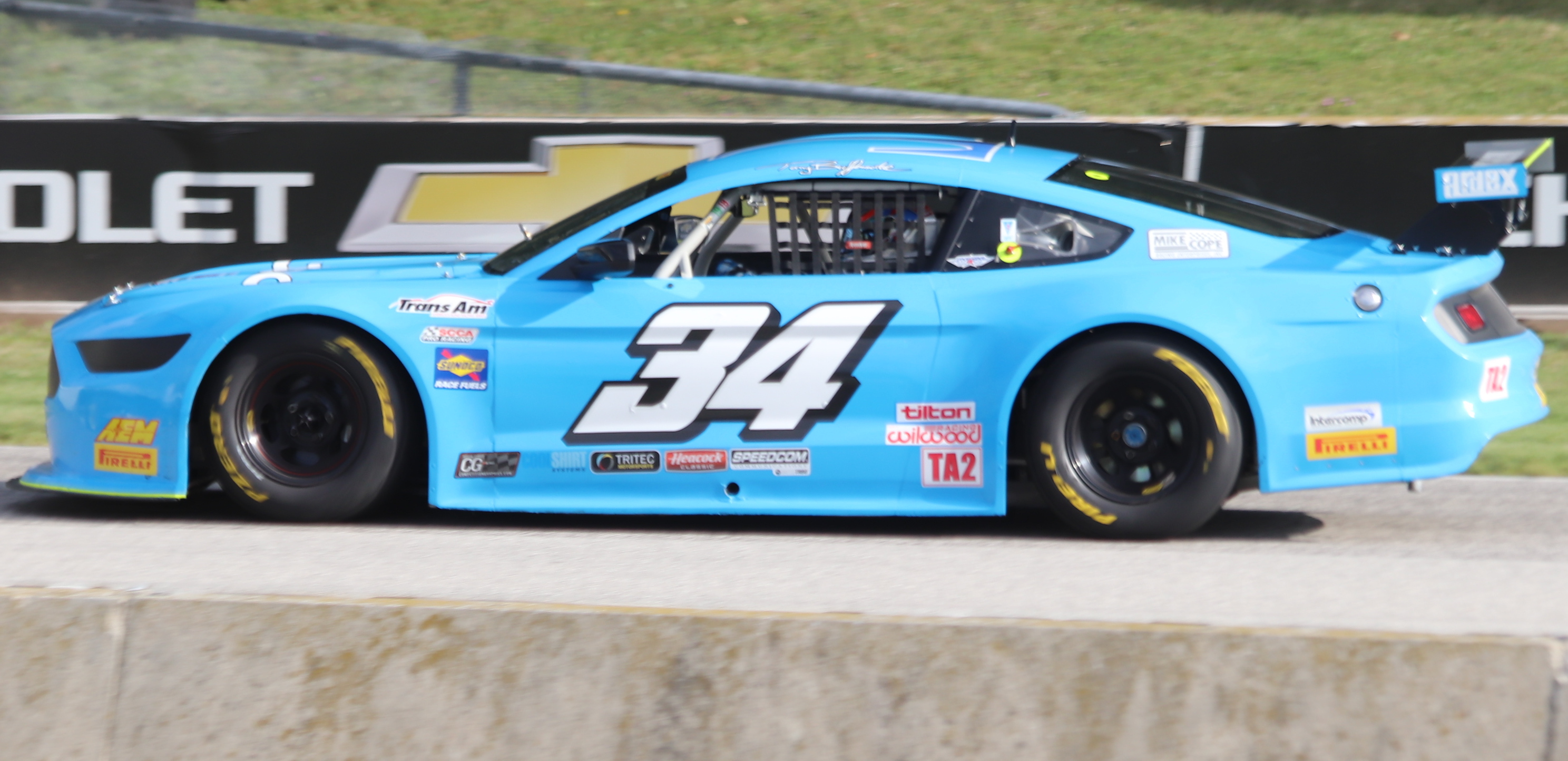
- Buffomante's 2019 TA2 car racing at Road America
- Nationality: American
- Born: September 26, 1972 (age 54) Buffalo, New York

Trans-Am TA2 career
- Debut season: 2013
- Current team: Mike Cope Racing
- Engine: Ford
- Championships: 1 (2016)
- Best finish: 1st in 2016

Previous series
- 2000 1994 1992–1993: USF2000 National Championship; USAC FF2000 National Championship; USAC FF2000 Eastern Division Championship

Championship titles
- 2016 1997: Trans-Am TA2; Star Mazda

Tony Buffomante (born September 26, 1972) is an American racing driver. Buffomante won the Star Mazda championship in 1997. Currently, Buffomante has been competing in the Trans-Am Series' TA2 class since 2013, and won the championship in 2016.

== Racing career ==
Buffomante started karting with the World Karting Association in 1985. He continued to do so until 1990. For 1991, he stepped up to the SCCA Spec Racer Renault class. In 1992, Buffomante switched to single-seaters in the Formula Continental class. At the SCCA National Championship Runoffs, Buffomante finished third running the fastest lap of the race. He also made his first appearance in the pro F2000 series the, USAC FF2000 Eastern Division Championship. At Watkins Glen International, Buffomante finished in eleventh place. He returned the following season for two races with a best finish of seventh. In 1995, Buffomante achieved success in the SCCA Central Division Spec Racer Ford class. He won races at Blackhawk Farms Raceway and Road America. He finished third in the season standings. The following year Buffomante started in Star Mazda and the SCCA Spec Racer Ford Pro Series. Buffomante ran his Star Mazda in the SCCA Central Division Formula Atlantic class achieving a sixth place in the championship, behind Tony Ave. The New York driver ran four races in the Spec Racer Ford Pro Series. His best result was a third place at Heartland Park Topeka.

In 1997, Buffomante ran the pro Star Mazda series full time. He dominated the season winning eight races. But without a major sponsor, Buffomante was not able to go up the racing ladder. For 1998, Buffomante competed in the Night before the 500 Star Mazda race. He dominated the race winning it from pole position. He also ran in the SCCA Star Mazda division winning the National Championship Runoffs. Buffomante took sabbatical in 1999 due to budget problems. He returned for 2000 in the USF2000 with Archangel Motorsports. The season started excellent at Phoenix International Raceway. Buffomante finished the first race of the season in second place, behind series champion Aaron Justus. He missed a number of rounds due to technical difficulties. He eventually finished fifteenth in the series championship, in front of Harold Primat.

For 2001, Buffomante started in the American Power Boat Association. In his rookie season, Buffomante finished fourth in the APBA Pro Series. In 2002, he won the Great Lakes Silver Cup Series in the Factory I class in a Mercruiser HP 500 powered Warlock. Buffomante won the title again in 2003 and 2004.

Buffomante returned to auto racing in 2005 in the amateur based Factory Five Challenge sanctioned by NASA. He won three NASA National Championship in a row, two in the Factory Five Challenge, one in the Touring 2 class. The years after, he ran in the Grand-Am sanctioned Ford Mustang Challenge. He finished fourth in the inaugural season standings. Buffomante won races in the series in 2009 and 2010 before continuing in the Continental Tire Sports Car Challenge in 2011 and 2012. In his Ford Mustang his best result was a seventh place at Lime Rock Park.

In 2013, Buffomante joined the revived Trans-Am Series in the TA2 class. In 2013, he only competed at Mosport Park scoring a triple crown, winning the race from pole position and scoring the fastest lap. After another partial Trans-Am, and partial Pirelli World Challenge season in 2014, Buffomante joined Trans-Am full time for 2015. He scored two podium finished in the last three races of the season finished eighth in the season standings. He won the 2016 TA2 championship.

== Personal ==
Buffomante is an alumnus of the University of Notre Dame where he studied Management and Computer Science. After graduating in 1994, he joined Arthur Andersen for two years. In 1996, Buffomante joined Sears Roebuck in the IT Audit and IT Security divisions. In 2020, after several years at KPMG, Buffomante joined global IT services company Wipro as a Senior Vice President and Global Head of Cybersecurity & Risk Services.

In May 1998, Buffomante was engaged to Nita Malkani, getting married in February 1999.

Buffomante's son, Gian, currently races full-time in the Trans Am Series.

== Complete motorsports results ==
=== SCCA National Championship Runoffs ===
Year	Track	Car	Engine	Class	Finish	Start	Status
1992	Road Atlanta	Reynard SF	Ford	Formula Continental	3	5	Running
1995	Mid-Ohio	Spec Racer	Ford	Spec Racer Ford	6	19	Running
1998	Mid-Ohio	Star	Mazda	Formula Mazda	1	2	Running

=== American Open-Wheel racing results ===
(key) (Races in bold indicate pole position, races in italics indicate fastest race lap)

==== USAC FF2000 Eastern Division Championship ====
Year	Entrant	1	2	3	4	5	6	7	8	9	Pos	Points
1992		ROA1	IRP	NAZ	SHA	WGI; 11	TOP	ROA2	SEB		???	???
1993		ATL	IRP	WGI; 7	MOH; 23	RAM	NHS	SHA1	SHA2	LRP	???	???

==== USAC FF2000 National Championship results ====
Year	Entrant	1	2	3	4	5	6	7	8	9	10	Pos	Points
1994		IRP1; 21	IRP2; 34	IRP3	WGI; 13	BFR	TOP	NHS	SHA1	SHA2	LRP	???	???

==== USF2000 National Championship results ====
Year	Entrant	1	2	3	4	5	6	7	8	9	10	11	12	13	Pos	Points
2000	Archangel Motorsports	PIR; 2	MOS1; 8	MOS2; 13	IRP1; 4	ROA1; 34	ROA1; DNS	TRR	MOS3	WGI1	WGI2	IRP2; 13	ATL1	ATL1	**15th**	**74**
