= 1992 USAC FF2000 Eastern Division Championship =

The 1992 USAC FF2000 Eastern Division Championship was the first season since the east/west split of the series by the United States Auto Club. Chris Simmons won the series championship for SOTARE Racing in a Van Diemen RF92.

== Race calendar and results ==
Round	Circuit	Location	Date	Pole position	Fastest lap	Winner
1	Road Atlanta	(United States) Braselton, Georgia	April 25	(United States) Tom Schwietz		(United States) Tom Schwietz
2	Indianapolis Raceway Park (Note: The race at Indianapolis Raceway Park was the "Night before the 500". This race was as a combined event, for both the USAC FF2000 Eastern and Western divisions.)	(United States) Brownsburg, Indiana	May 23	(United States) Mike Palumbo		(United States) Greg Tracy
3	Nazareth Speedway	(United States) Nazareth, Pennsylvania	June 7	(United States) Chris Simmons		(United States) Chris Simmons
4	Shannonville Motorsport Park	(Canada) Shannonville, Ontario	June 21	(United States) Kevin West		(United States) Kevin West
5	Watkins Glen International	(United States) Watkins Glen, New York	June 28	(United States) Brian Cunningham		(United States) Chris Simmons
6	Heartland Park Topeka (Note: The race at Heartland Park Topeka was the "East-West Topeka Shootout". This race was as a combined event, for both the USAC FF2000 Eastern and Western divisions.)	(United States) Topeka, Kansas	August 1			(Canada) Greg Moore
7	Road Atlanta	(United States) Braselton, Georgia	September 6	(United States) Kevin West		(United States) Kevin West
8	Sebring International Raceway	(United States) Sebring, Florida	October 24	(Canada) Greg Pootmans		(United States) Chris Simmons

== Final standings ==
Color	Result
Gold	Winner
Silver	2nd place
Bronze	3rd place
Green	4th & 5th place
Light Blue	6th–10th place
Dark Blue	11th place or lower
Purple	Did not finish
Red	Did not qualify (DNQ)
Brown	Withdrawn (Wth)
Black	Disqualified (DSQ)
White	Did not start (DNS)
Blank	Did not participate (DNP)
Blank	Driver replacement (Rpl)
Blank	Injured (Inj)
Blank	No race held (NH)

Rank	Driver	(United States) ROA1	(United States) IRP	(United States) NAZ	(Canada) SHA	(United States) WGI	(United States) TOP	(United States) ROA2	(United States) SEB	Points
1	(United States) Chris Simmons	7	2	1	2	1	9	12	1	
2	(United States) Kevin West	5	17	3	1	2	2	1	4	
3	(Canada) Greg Pootmans	15	8	12	7	7	15	6	2	
4	(United States) Mike Andersen	17	DNQ	7	9	9	7	4	8	
5	(United States) Steve Keister	9	21	5		4		3		
	(United States) Frank Bernstein					3				
	(United States) Rick Brunner					13				
	(United States) Doug Boyer		6				20			
	(United States) Tony Buffomante					11				
	(United States) Victor Calderon							10	11	
	(United States) Cary Capparelli				13					
	(United States) Clay Collier						19			
	(Brazil) Jose Cordova								3	
	(United States) Brian Cunningham		10	2		5				
	(United States) Mike Davies								5	
	(United States) Stevan Davis	DNF						5		
	(United States) Mark Epling					12				
	(United States) Curtis Farley						17			
	(United States) Danny Faucetta	11								
	(United States) Geoff Foster				14					
	(United States) George Frazier				16					
	(United States) Ken Freber		22							
	(United States) Jeff Galiardo					DNS				
	(United States) Ken Gerhardt				15					
	(United States) Broc Glover				5	20				
	(United States) Joe Goetz	10	16	6	3	8	21			
	(United States) Mark Gold								13	
	(United States) Mike Gould					DNF				
	(United States) Steve Harrison	16	DNQ	14	10	DNS		8		
	(United States) Victor Hatala	24								
	(United States) John Hays							7		
	(Canada) Rick Hayward				4					
	(United States) Tony Hunt		12							
	(United States) Peter Johantgen	14	14	9	8	6			16	
	(United States) Terry Johnson			17						
	(United States) Jim Keeker		7							
	(United States) Steve Knapp		9							
	(United States) Bob Knox						5			
	(United States) Chuck Kurtz	18	DNQ							
	(United States) Ray Langston	DNF								
	(United States) Richard Lee								14	
	(United States) Butch Matthews		DNQ							
	(United States) Bruce May		18							
	(United States) Corey Mayo	DNS	DNQ	19						
	(United States) Todd Mayo	DNF	DNQ							
	(United States) Leonard McCue								15	
	(United States) Wendell Miller						11			
	(Canada) Greg Moore		3				1			
	(United States) Hannu Nummenpaa					10			10	
	(United States) Jim Palmieri			10						
	(United States) Mike Palumbo		5				3			
	(United States) Jim Pugliese					19				
	(United States) Dan Pyanowski	DNF		11	11	17				
	(United States) Clifford Rassweiler	25							7	
	(United States) Mike Rogers	19								
	(United States) Richard Rush	23								
	(United States) Ricky Rutt		13	4						
	(United States) Sam Ryan			8						
	(United States) Jeff Sands		DNQ							
	(United States) Tom Schwietz	1								
	(United States) Mike Shank	12	24							
	(United States) Ernest Sikes	2								
	(United States) Alex Smith							14		
	(United States) Skip Streets		DNQ				16			
	(United States) Wally Szymanski		8							
	(United States) Randy Tolliver		DNQ							
	(United States) Greg Tracy		1				DNS			
	(United States) Dennis Vitolo		23							
	(United States) Lawrence Walsh								12	
	(United States) Tom Walsh	6	20	20		16			9	
	(United States) Rick Watkins						13			
	(United States) David Webb	3						2	6	
	(United States) Warren White		DNQ							
	(United States) Miles Whitlock	24								
	(United States) Dwight Woodbridge		DNQ		6					
