= Otmar Szafnauer =

American-Romanian engineer, F1 team lead

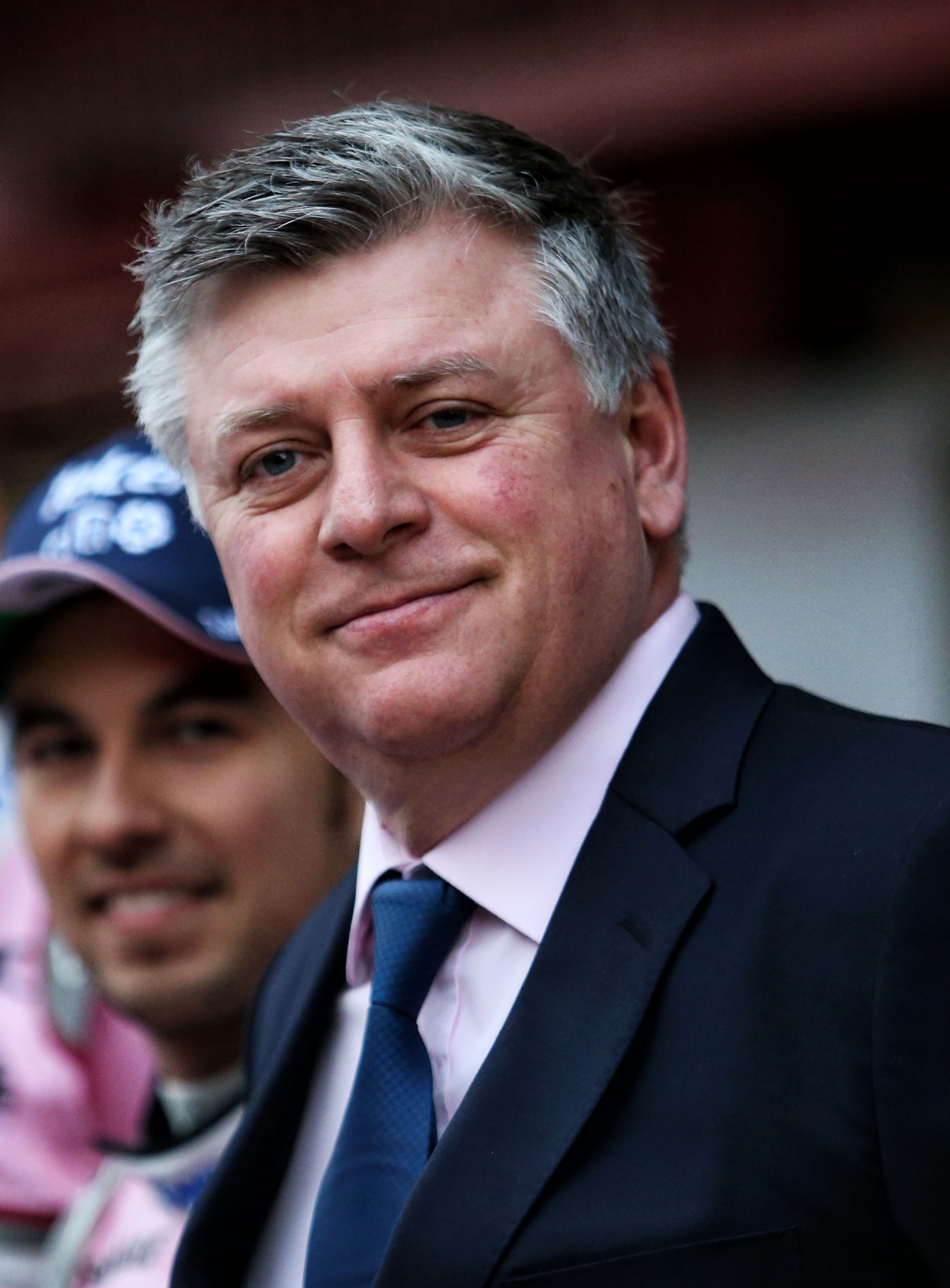
- Szafnauer in 2018
- Born: Otmar Marin Szafnauer; 13 August 1964 (age 62); Semlac, Romania
- Education: Wayne State University; University of Detroit
- Awards: USF2000 Hall of Fame 2013

Otmar Marin Szafnauer (born 13 August 1964) is a Romanian and American engineer. He served as Team Principal of Alpine F1 Team from February 2022 to July 2023.

== Biography ==
Szafnauer was born in Semlac, a small village in Western Romania to an American father of German descent and a Romanian mother. His family moved to Detroit in the United States when he was seven years old. He received a Bachelor of Science degree in electrical engineering from Wayne State University in Detroit before completing a master's degree in business and finance from the University of Detroit Mercy.

He joined the Ford Motor Company in 1986 and was appointed Programmes Manager for Ford in the United States. While working for Ford, he attended the Jim Russell Racing Driver School and started racing in Formula Ford in 1991. He left Ford in 1998 to become Operations Director at British American Racing in Formula One. After unsuccessful discussions with Jaguar Racing, he was hired by Honda on its return to Formula One in 2001, rising to Vice President of Honda Racing Developments and a member of the management board of the Honda F1 team. After leaving Honda in 2008, he founded Soft Pauer which released the official Formula One Timing and Track Positioning Application on the iPhone in June 2009.

Szafnauer joined Force India in October 2009 and played an integral role in the team's improved performance with the team going on an upward path, finishing seventh in 2010 and sixth in 2011, 2013 and 2014 before breaking into the top five in 2015 and achieving the team-best finish of fourth in 2016 and 2017. Szafnauer's efforts also played an instrumental role in the team securing a long-term agreement to use the Mercedes-Benz powertrain from the 2014 season onwards.

Szafnauer remained with Force India as they were sold in 2019 and became Racing Point and remained with them still when they became Aston Martin for the 2021 season, before leaving the team in January 2022. In February 2022, he joined the BWT Alpine F1 Team as team principal. He left Alpine after the 2023 Belgian Grand Prix.

== After Alpine ==
After his Alpine exit, Szafnauer joined Jake Humphrey and Rob Smedley on the High Performance Racing Podcast, a podcast focusing on Formula 1 analysis. In 2024, he launched EventR, a mobile app for team logistics, with businessman Alex Powell. The product was developed from his experiences as an F1 Team Principal.

On 1 February 2026, Szafnauer took on the role of CEO at Formula 2 team Van Amersfoort Racing.

== Awards and recognition ==
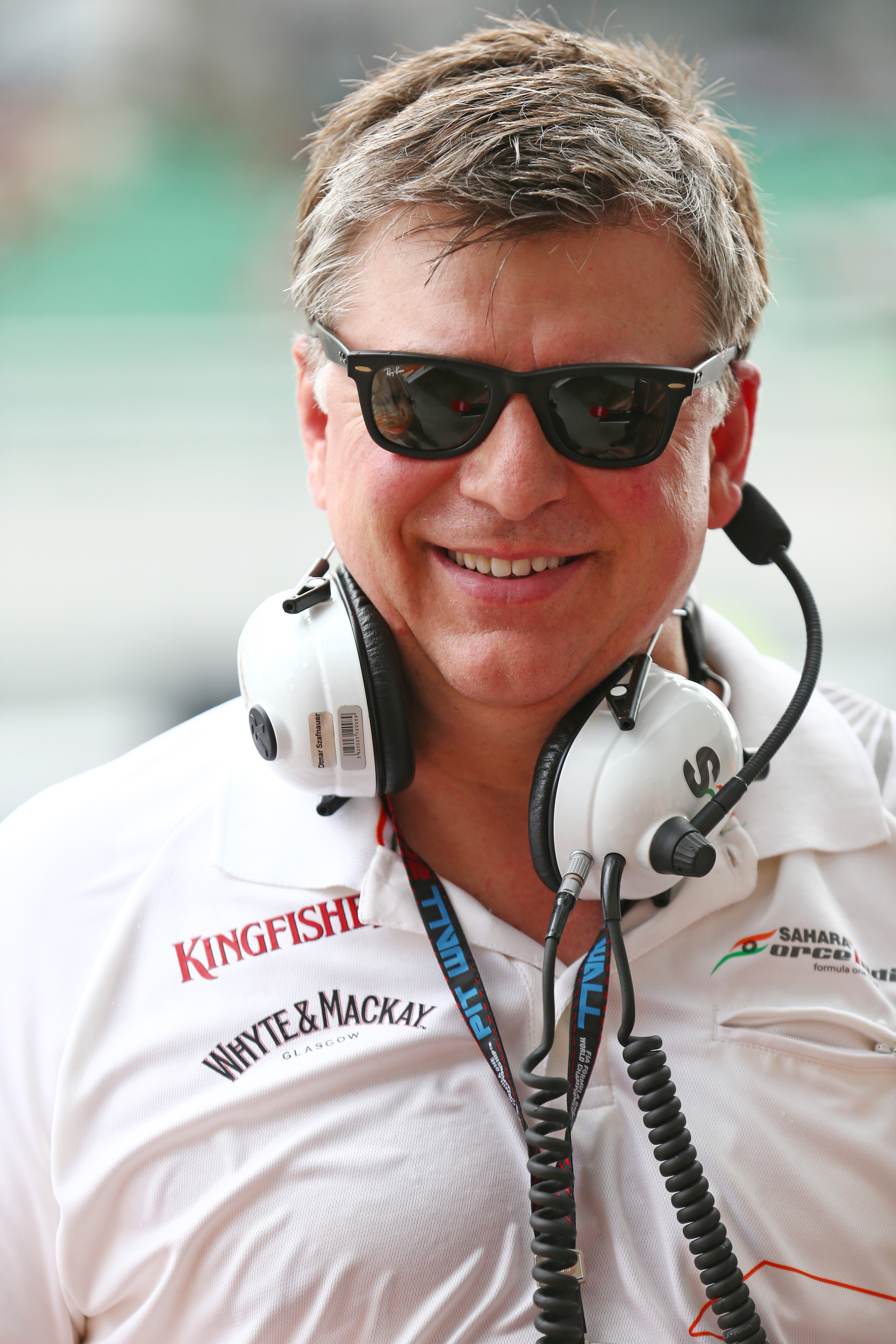
Szafnauer at the 2013 Malaysian Grand Prix

In 2013, Szafnauer was inducted into the USF2000 Hall of Fame in recognition of his racing achievements in motorsport over the last twenty years.

== USF2000 results ==
=== USAC FF2000 Eastern Division Championship ===
Year	Entrant	1	2	3	4	5	6	7	8	9	Pos	Points
1993		ATL	IRP	WGI	MOH	RAM; 13	NHS	SHA1	SHA2	LRP	???	???

=== USAC FF2000 National Championship results ===
Year	Entrant	1	2	3	4	5	6	7	8	9	10	Pos	Points
1994		IRP1; 22	IRP2; 19	500	WGI; 26	BFR; 18	TOP	NHS; 19	SHA1; 19	SHA2; 26	LRP	???	???

==== USF2000 National Championship ====
Year	Entrant	1	2	3	4	5	6	7	8	9	10	Pos	Points
1995		PIR1	PIR2	500; DNQ	RIR	WGI	MOH1	NHS	ATL1	ATL2	MOH1	–	–
