= Allen May =

American racecar driver (born 1969)

Allen May (born October 30, 1969, in Dallas, Texas) is an American racecar driver. He drove in the U.S. F2000 National Championship, and in 1997, he started a single race in the Indy Racing League IndyCar Series for Arizona Motorsport at Texas Motor Speedway where he crashed on lap 36 and was credited with 22nd place.

May is also a former Formula Continental SCCA national champion.

== Racing record ==
=== SCCA National Championship Runoffs ===
Year	Track	Car	Engine	Class	Finish	Start	Status
1992	Road Atlanta	BRD AFV2	Volkswagen	Formula Vee	16	16	Running
1993	Road Atlanta	BRD AFV2	Volkswagen	Formula Vee	3	5	Running
1994	Mid-Ohio	BRD AFV2	Volkswagen	Formula Vee	40	11	Retired
1994	Mid-Ohio	Van Diemen RF94	Ford	Formula Continental	1	1	Running

=== American Open-Wheel racing results ===
(key) (Races in bold indicate pole position, races in italics indicate fastest race lap)

==== American Continental Championship results ====
Year	Entrant	1	2	3	4	5	6	7	Pos	Points
1993		ROA; 10	MOS	SON	IOW	WGI	TRR	DAL; 25	???	???
1994		MOS1	WGI	IOW	TRR	MOS2	ROA	DAL; 7	???	???

==== USAC FF2000 National Championship results ====
Year	Entrant	1	2	3	4	5	6	7	8	9	10	Pos	Points
1994		IRP1; 39	IRP2; DNS	IRP3; 3	WGI; 7	BFR; 30	TOP	NHS	SHA1	SHA2	LRP	???	???

==== USF2000 National Championship results ====
Year	Entrant	1	2	3	4	5	6	7	8	9	10	11	12	Pos	Points
1996		WDW; 3	STP; 6	PIR; 4	DSC1; 47	MOS	IRP; 1	RIR; 2	WGI1; 4	WGI2; 34	MOH; 24	NHS; 5	LVS; 4	**5th**	???
1997		WDW	STP	PIR	DSC1	DSC2	SAV	PPI; 8	CHA1; 6	CHA2; 4	MOH	WGI	WGI	**N.C.**	**N.C.**
2002	Primus Racing	SEB1	SEB2	MOS1	MOS2	IRP; DNS	MIL1	MIL2	MOH	ROA1	ROA2	VIR1	VIR2	**N.C.**	**N.C.**

==== IRL IndyCar Series ====
Year	Team	Chassis	No.	Engine	1	2	3	4	5	6	7	8	9	10	Rank	Points	Ref
1996-97	Sinden Racing Services	Dallara IR7	44	Oldsmobile	NH1	LV1	WDW	PHX	INDY	TEX; 22	PIK	CMS	NH2	LV2	50th	13	
