= Alan May (disambiguation) =

Alan May is a Canadian ice hockey player.

Alan May may also refer to:

- Alan Nunn May (1911–2003), English physicist and Soviet spy
- Alan Le May (1899–1964), American novelist and screenplay writer

== See also ==
- Allen May (born 1969), racecar driver
- Alan Mayes (born 1953), retired English footballer
