= Midwestern Council =

The Midwestern Council of Sports Car Clubs was formed in 1958 and is a confederation of seven separate Wisconsin and Illinois amateur racing organizations. The group holds regional races at local race tracks including Road America, Blackhawk Farms Raceway, Gingerman Raceway, Grattan Raceway Park, Milwaukee Mile and Autobahn Country Club among others. The group's rulesets and car classifications are similar to the SCCA with minor but distinct differences. Midwestern Council prides itself on a family-friendly atmosphere and emphasis is on fun and safety first. Safety has always been paramount, and the combination of thorough driver training, tough stewarding and sensible competition has given the group over thirty seasons of fatality-free racing.

Midwestern Council celebrated its 50th anniversary in 2008, which makes it one of the longest existing amateur racing organizations in the United States. "Council" as it is colloquially named has parallel history to several long-running and historically significant racetracks in the Wisconsin and Illinois area.

== Club affiliation ==
Seven distinct clubs combined in order to provide a more cost-effective method of controlling track rental fees and a more consistent competition field size. They include:

- Salt Creek Sports Car Club (SCSCC)
- Chicagoland Sports Car Club (CSCC)
- Great Lakes Sport Car Club (GLSCC)
- Lakeshore Sports Car Club (LSCC)
- Madison Sports Car Club (MSCC)
- North Suburban Sports Car Club (NSSCC)
- Sports Car Club of Rockford (SCCR)

== Types of racing ==
Midwestern council supports wheel-to-wheel style circuit-track racing, high speed autocross, lap days and holds several annual schools to teach drivers how to be responsible on track with other competitors. Among the many types of cars invited to attend a Midwestern Council weekend are Vintage Historics. Cars fitting a certain historical pedigree are allowed to compete in their own race group and maintain a special consideration of passing rules. While there are dedicated vintage clubs and events there are no sanctioned events where both modern vehicles and vintage vehicles are accommodated in the same day.

The final wheel-to-wheel event of the season is the locally well-known "That Loooong Race" - a 100 mile mini-enduro wheel to wheel race at Blackhawk Farms Raceway. The two-day event features six race groups, trick-or-treating and big wheel races for the kids, Saturday worker rides and free crew/guest admission. The race has been held for 46 years and is hosted/sponsored by the Chicagoland Sports Car Club.

== Notable members ==
While the Council's emphasis has always been "on fun and not as a breeding ground of racing heroes", some of the more notable members of Midwestern Council's history are listed below:

- Rick Dittman and Bruce Nesbitt have been Trans-Am regulars after getting their start in Midwestern Council.
- John Mahler raced at Indy after attending a Midwestern Council school.
- Mike Rahal, Bobby Rahal's father.
- Horst Kwech, 2.5 Trans-Am champion, and later a Ford factory team driver, was a North Suburban Sports Car Club member/racer.
- John Welch, Bill Vincent and Bob Dupre, all MC members, set up a race team to compete in the single-seater Can-Am series and ran several events.
- Augie Pabst and Harry Heuer raced Scarabs and Chaparrals with MC at Meadowdale and Milwaukee State Fair Park.
- Burt "B.S." Levy creator of The Last Open Road, a series of racing fiction books inspired by real-life events.
