= Doug Boyer =

American racing driver

Doug Boyer is a former American racing driver. He competed in the Indy Lights series from 1994 to 1996 for Summit Motorsports with Red Line Oil sponsorship. He finished eighth in series points in 1994 and fourth in 1995. He only competed part-time in 1996 and finished 23rd in the championship. His best finish was second place in the 1995 Vancouver race.

== Complete motorsports results ==
=== American Open-Wheel racing results ===
(key) (Races in bold indicate pole position, races in italics indicate fastest race lap)

==== American Continental Championship results ====
Year	Entrant	1	2	3	4	5	6	7	8	Pos	Points
1992		FIR; 13	MOS	IOW	WGI	LRP	TRR	SON1	**SON2**; 1	???	???
1993		ROA	MOS	SON; 3	IOW	WGI	TRR	DAL		???	???

==== USAC FF2000 Western Division Championship ====
Year	Entrant	1	2	3	4	5	6	7	8	Pos	Points
1992		SON	MMR; 6	IRP; 6	LV; 4	WSR1; 5	TOP; 20	PIR	WSR2; 2	**5th**	???
1993		WSR1; 2	WSR2; 3	IRP; 15	**COL**; 4	**TOP**; 2	LS1; 2	**LS2**; 1		**2nd**	???

==== Indy Lights ====
Year	Team	1	2	3	4	5	6	7	8	9	10	11	12	Rank	Points
1994	Summitt Motorsports	PIR; 17	LBH; 7	MIL; 16	DET	POR; 6	CLE; 6	TOR; 6	MOH; 20	NHS; 8	VAN; 17	NAZ; 18	LS; 4	**8th**	**47**
1995	Summitt Motorsports	MIA; 5	PIR; 4	LBH; 22	NAZ; 5	MIL; 9	DET; 8	POR; 8	TOR; 3	CLE; 3	NHS; 9	VAN; 2	LS; 3	**4th**	**108**
1996	Summitt Motorsports	HMS; 8	LBH; 22	NAZ	MIC; 16	DET; 13	POR; 19	CLE	TOR	TRR	VAN	LS		**23rd**	**5**
