= Montezuma's Ferrari =

1999 novel by Burt Levy

- Author: Burt "B.S." Levy
- Language: English
- Series: The Last Open Road
- Genre: Novel
- Publisher: 1999 Think Fast Ink
- Publication place: United States
- Media type: Print (hardback)
- Pages: 395
- ISBN: 978-0-9642107-1-4
- OCLC: 42813780
- Preceded by: The Last Open Road
- Followed by: The Fabulous Trashwagon

Montezuma's Ferrari is the second novel in Burt "BS" Levy's series about a 19-year-old New Jersey gas station mechanic growing up and coming of age while being sucked into the glamorous, dangerous world of open-road sports car racing during the 1950s. The story begins just a week after The Last Open Road ends. In the book, Buddy Palumbo, the main character, repairs cars at the Sinclair gas station he works at in Passaic, New Jersey, and races all over the Eastern, predominantly Northern, United States and Mexico.

The book visits races at Sebring International Raceway in Florida for the 12 Hours of Sebring. The book starts out at the Carrera Panamericana in Mexico.
