= 1992 SCCA American Continental Championship =

Car racing competition

The 1992 SCCA American Continental Championship was the first season of the Sports Car Club of America sanctioned professional Formula Continental championship. Greg Ray won the series championship for Primus Racing in a Van Diemen RF92

== Race calendar and results ==
Round	Circuit	Location	Date	Pole position	Fastest lap	Winner
1	Firebird International Raceway	(United States) Chandler, Arizona	May 31	(Brazil) Jose Cordova		(Brazil) Jose Cordova
2	Mosport International Raceway	(Canada) Bowmanville, Ontario	June 28	(United States) Thomas Schwietz		(United States) Thomas Schwietz
3	Des Moines Street Circuit	(United States) Des Moines, Iowa	July 11	(United States) Thomas Schwietz		(United States) Thomas Schwietz
4	Watkins Glen International	(United States) Watkins Glen, New York	July 18	(United States) Chris Simmons		(United States) Howard Katz
5	Lime Rock Park	(United States) Lexington, Ohio	July 25	(United States) Thomas Schwietz		(United States) Howard Katz
6	Circuit Trois-Rivières	(Canada) Trois-Rivières, Quebec	August 15	(United States) Thomas Schwietz		(United States) Danny Faucetta
7	Sears Point International Raceway	(United States) Sonoma, California	October 3	(United States) Greg Ray		(United States) Greg Ray
8	Sears Point International Raceway	(United States) Sonoma, California	October 4	(United States) Doug Boyer		(United States) Doug Boyer

=== Drivers' Championship ===
Scoring system

Position	1st	2nd	3rd	4th	5th	6th	7th	8th	9th	10th	11th	12th	13th	14th	15th
Points	20	16	14	12	11	10	9	8	7	6	5	4	3	2	1

Pos	Driver	(United States) FIR	(Canada) MOS	(United States) IOW	(United States) WGI	(United States) LRP	(Canada) TRR	(United States) SON		Points
1	(United States) Greg Ray	3	3	2	4	2	11	1	3	111
2	(United States) Thomas Schwietz		1	1	3	4	3	14	2	98
3	(United States) Clifford Rassweiler	9	5	3	6	6	4	10	10	76
4	(United States) Howard Katz		8		1	1	5	16	7	68
5	(United States) Danny Faucetta	14	10		10	3	1	6	8	66
6	(Denmark) Peter Hastrup	4						2	4	40
7	(Canada) Bobby Haggert Jr.	16	6			5	6	17	9	38
8	(Brazil) José Cordova	1	2							36
9	(United States) Frank Bernstein				5		2			27
10	(United States) David Conyers	7	9				7	15	16	26
11	(United States) George Frazier			11	16	7	8	13	15	26
12	(United States) Dave Weitzenhof		7		2					25
13	(United States) Bob Knox							3	5	25
14	(United States) Doug Boyer	13							1	23
15	(United States) Mike Faulknor							4	6	22
16	(United States) Larry White	11		7				11	13	22
17	(Canada) Rick Hayward		4				10			18
18	(United States) Randy McDaniel	2								16
19	(United States) Richard Schroebel							5	11	16
20	(United States) Phil Katzakian	8						8	17	16
21	(United States) Kim Drayton			4	15					13
22	(United States) Makoto Yamamura							7	12	13
23	(United States) John Renda	12		8						12
24	(United States) Mark Cruz		DNQ		9	11				12
25	(United States) Bill Stern	5		17						11
26	(United States) John Miller			5						11
27	(United States) Jim Whitney	6								10
28	(United States) John Hogdal			6						10
29	(United States) Steve Keister				7					9
30	(United States) John Thompson							9	14	9
31	(United States) Chris Simmons				8					8
32	(United States) Jim Pugliese					8				8
33	(United States) Bob Wright				14	10				8
34	(United States) Cary Capparelli			9	18		DNS			7
35	(United States) Christopher Fahan					9				7
36	(United States) David Welch						9			7
37	(United States) Jim Levi	10								6
38	(United States) Matt Karzen			10						6
39	(United States) Bruce Licausi				11					5
40	(United States) Darrell Benner							12	18	4
41	(United States) Steve Thomson			12						4
42	(United States) Tim Engelberth				12					4
43	(United States) Rick Watkins			13						3
44	(United States) Mark Defer		DNS		13					3
45	(United States) Rick Dale			14						2
46	(United States) Mike Palumbo	15								1
47	(United States) Rich Ingram			15						1
48	(United States) Wally Szymanski			16						0
49	(United States) Marcelo Gaffoglio	17								0
50	(United States) Joe Tesone				17					0
51	(United States) Lars Dirks	18								0
52	(United States) Jim Bryant	19								0
53	(United States) Mark Epling				19					0
54	(United States) Tony McClure	20								0
55	(United States) Stewart Paterson	21								0
56	(United States) Andy Paterson	22								0
57	(United States) Rege Brunner	23								0
58	(United States) Scott Rubenzer			DNS						0
59	(United States) Keith Freber		DNQ							0

Color	Result
Gold	Winner
Silver	2nd place
Bronze	3rd place
Green	4th & 5th place
Light Blue	6th–10th place
Dark Blue	Finished (Outside Top 10)
Purple	Did not finish
Red	Did not qualify (DNQ)
Brown	Withdrawn (Wth)
Black	Disqualified (DSQ)
White	Did not start (DNS)
Blank	Did not participate
