= 1995 Indy Lights season =

The 1995 PPG/Firestone Indy Lights Championship Powered By Buick consisted of 12 races. Canadian Greg Moore completely dominated the season, winning 10 times and winning the championship by over 100 points over his closest rival.

== Calendar ==
Race No	Track	State	Date	Laps	Distance	Time	Speed	Winner	Pole position	Most leading laps	Fastest race lap
1	Miami	Florida	March 5, 1995	25	2.943=73.585 km	0'47:00.675	93.316 km/h	Greg Moore	Greg Moore	Greg Moore	?
2	Phoenix	Arizona	April 2, 1995	75	1.6093=120.6975 km	0'42:56.133	168.668 km/h	Greg Moore	Claude Bourbonnais	Affonso Giaffone	?
3	Long Beach	California	April 9, 1995	47	2.558787=120.262989 km	0'58:23.255	123.584 km/h	Greg Moore	Greg Moore	Greg Moore	?
4	Nazareth	Pennsylvania	April 23, 1995	75	1.5223978=114.179835 km	0'44:23.382	154.333 km/h	Greg Moore	Bob Dorricott, Jr.	Greg Moore	?
5	Milwaukee	Wisconsin	June 4, 1995	75	1.6607976=124.55982 km	0'39:29.386	189.254 km/h	Greg Moore	Robbie Buhl	Greg Moore	?
6	Detroit	Michigan	June 11, 1995	24	3.37953=81.10872 km	0'50:08.993	97.040 km/h	Robbie Buhl	Robbie Buhl	Robbie Buhl	?
7	Portland	Oregon	June 25, 1995	39	3.138135=122.387265 km	0'51:19.388	143.078 km/h	Greg Moore	Greg Moore	Greg Moore	?
8	Toronto	Canada	July 16, 1995	42	2.8709912=120.58163 km	0'52:41.622	137.301 km/h	Greg Moore	Greg Moore	Greg Moore	?
9	Cleveland	Ohio	July 23, 1995	32	3.8124317=121.9978144 km	0'48:37.497	150.537 km/h	Greg Moore	Greg Moore	Greg Moore	?
10	Loudon	New Hampshire	August 20, 1995	71	1.7026394=120.887397 km	0'34:29.131	210.327 km/h	Greg Moore	Robbie Buhl	Robbie Buhl	?
11	Vancouver	Canada	September 3, 1995	44	2.7406379=120.588068 km	0'51:29.013	140.536 km/h	Pedro Chaves	Greg Moore	Greg Moore	?
12	Monterey	California	September 10, 1995	34	3.5629902=121.141667 km	0'48:09.053	150.953 km/h	Greg Moore	Greg Moore	Greg Moore	?

== Race summaries ==
=== Miami race ===
Held March 5 at Miami Bicentennial Park. Greg Moore won the pole and the bonus point for leading the most laps.

Top Five Results

1. Greg Moore
2. Jeff Ward
3. Pedro Chaves
4. Robbie Buhl
5. Doug Boyer

Full Results

=== Phoenix race ===
Held April 2 at Phoenix International Raceway. Claude Bourbonnais won the pole. Affonso Giaffone jumped the field on the final restart and finished the race first but he was assessed a one-lap penalty for jumping the restart, handing the win to Greg Moore. Giaffone still got the bonus point for leading the most laps.

Top Five Results

1. Greg Moore
2. Robbie Buhl
3. Buzz Calkins
4. Doug Boyer
5. Affonso Giaffone

Full Results

=== Long Beach race ===
Held April 9 at Long Beach, California Street Course. Greg Moore won the pole and got the bonus point for leading the most laps.

Top Five Results

1. Greg Moore
2. Robbie Buhl
3. David DeSilva
4. Alex Padilla
5. Pedro Chaves

Full Results

=== Nazareth race ===
Held April 23 at Nazareth Speedway. Bob Dorricott Jr. won the pole and Greg Moore got the bonus point for leading the most laps. Originally Robbie Buhl set fastest qualifying time, but was disqualified due to underweight.

Top Five Results

1. Greg Moore
2. Affonso Giaffone
3. Robbie Buhl
4. Buzz Calkins
5. Doug Boyer

Full Results

=== Milwaukee race ===
Held June 4 at The Milwaukee Mile. Robbie Buhl won the pole and Greg Moore got the bonus point for leading the most laps.

Top Five Results

1. Greg Moore
2. Affonso Giaffone
3. Buzz Calkins
4. Robbie Buhl
5. Mark Hotchkis

Full Results

=== Detroit race ===
Held June 11 at Belle Isle Raceway. Robbie Buhl won the pole, got the bonus point for leading the most laps, and won the race at his home track. This race featured a huge crash on the first lap that ended with Enrique Contreras upside down. He would unbuckle while still upside down and walk away uninjured.

Top Five Results

1. Robbie Buhl
2. Greg Moore
3. Jeff Ward
4. Nick Firestone
5. Affonso Giaffone

Full Results

=== Portland race ===
Held June 25 at Portland International Raceway. Greg Moore won the pole and got the bonus point for leading the most laps.

Top Five Results

1. Greg Moore
2. Affonso Giaffone
3. Nick Firestone
4. Mike Borkowski
5. Buzz Calkins

Full Results

=== Toronto race ===
Held July 16 at Exhibition Place. Greg Moore won the pole and got the bonus point for leading the most laps.

Top Five Results

1. Greg Moore
2. Robbie Buhl
3. Doug Boyer
4. Affonso Giaffone
5. José Luis Di Palma

Full Results

=== Cleveland race ===
Held July 23 at Burke Lakefront Airport. Greg Moore won the pole, got the bonus point for leading the most laps, and by winning this race he clinched the championship with three races remaining. On the last lap Trevor Seibert had a spectacular end over end accident. He was not injured.

Top Five Results

1. Greg Moore
2. Pedro Chaves
3. Doug Boyer
4. Mark Hotchkis
5. Buzz Calkins

Full Results

=== Loudon race ===
Held August 20 at New Hampshire International Speedway. Robbie Buhl won the pole and got the bonus point for leading the most laps.

Top Five Results

1. Greg Moore
2. Claude Bourbonnais
3. Robbie Buhl
4. Pedro Chaves
5. Mark Hotchkis

Full Results

=== Vancouver race ===
Held September 3 at Pacific Place. Greg Moore won the pole and got the bonus point for leading the most laps.

Top Five Results

1. Pedro Chaves
2. Doug Boyer
3. Robbie Buhl
4. Affonso Giaffone
5. Greg Moore

Full Results

=== Laguna Seca race ===
Held September 10 at Mazda Raceway Laguna Seca. Greg Moore won the pole and got the bonus point for leading the most laps. This was his seventh race of the season he scored the maximum number of points available.

Top Five Results

1. Greg Moore
2. Affonso Giaffone
3. Doug Boyer
4. Pedro Chaves
5. Nick Firestone
- This was Greg Moores 13th and final Indy Lights victory in his final Indy Lights race. His race victory total is an all-time record which as of 2019 is still unbroken.

Full Results

== Final points standings ==
=== Driver ===
For every race the points were awarded: 20 points to the winner, 16 for runner-up, 14 for third place, 12 for fourth place, 10 for fifth place, 8 for sixth place, 6 seventh place, winding down to 1 points for 12th place. Additional points were awarded to the pole winner (1 point) and to the driver leading the most laps (1 point).

Place	Name	Country	Team	Total points	(United States)	(United States)	(United States)	(United States)	(United States)	(United States)	(United States)	(Canada)	(United States)	(United States)	(Canada)	(United States)
1	Greg Moore	Canada	Forsythe Racing	242	22	20	22	21	21	16	22	22	20	20	12	22
2	Robbie Buhl	United States	Dorricott Racing	140	12	16	16	14	13	22	1	16	-	16	14	-
3	Affonso Giaffone	Brazil	Brian Stewart Racing	122	5	11	-	16	16	10	16	12	-	8	12	16
4	Doug Boyer	United States	Summitt Motorsports	108	10	12	-	10	4	5	5	14	14	4	16	14
5	Pedro Chaves	Portugal	Mark Weida Leading Edge Racing	99	14	-	10	4	3	-	8	-	16	12	20	12
6	Buzz Calkins	United States	Bradley Motorsports	77	4	14	-	12	14	6	10	5	10	-	2	-
7	Mark Hotchkis	United States	Mark Weida Leading Edge Racing	57	-	6	-	-	10	3	4	8	12	10	-	4
8	Jeff Ward	United States	Arizona Motorsports	56	16	1	6	6	8	14	-	-	2	-	-	3
9	Nick Firestone	United States	Brian Stewart Racing	52	3	2	1	-	-	12	14	-	3	3	4	10
10	David DeSilva	United States	Genoa Racing	33	-	-	14	-	6	2	-	4	4	2	1	-
11	Alex Padilla	United States	Mark Weida Leading Edge Racing	32	2	-	12	8	-	-	-	-	-	-
11	Alex Padilla	United States	Team Medlin	32											8	2
12	Mike Borkowski	United States	Team Medlin	31	-	-	-	2	5	4	12	3	5	-	-	-
13	Claude Bourbonnais	Canada	Forsythe Racing	29	6	1	-	-	-	-	-	-	-	16	-	6
	Diego Guzman	Colombia	Dick Simon Racing	29	-	-	-	5	-	8	-	-	6	-
	Diego Guzman	Colombia	PacWest Lights	29											5	5
15	José Luis Di Palma	Argentina	McCormack Racing	24	8	-	-	-	-	-	6	10	-	-	-	-
16	Bertrand Godin	Canada	Forsythe Racing	16	-	-	-	-	-	-	2	6	8	-	-	-
	Trevor Seibert	Canada	Forsythe Racing	16	-	-	-	-	-	-	-	-	-	5	3	8
18	Bob Reid	United States	Derrick Walker Racing	15	-	-	8	-	-	-	-	-	-	-	6	1
19	Jeff Andretti	United States	Canaska Racing	12	-	-	-	3	-	1	-	2	-	6	-	-
20	Niko Palhares	Brazil	PacWest Lights	9	1	8	-	-	-	-	-	-	-	-	-	-
21	Peter Faucetta Jr.	United States	FRE Racing	8	-	-	4	-	1	-	-	1	1	1	-	-
22	David LaCroix	United States	Dick Simon Racing	7	-	3	-	1	-	-	3	-	-	-	-	-
23	Beaux Barfield	United States	Breezley Motorsports	5	-	5	-	-	-	-	-	-	-	-	-	-
	Enrique Contreras	Mexico	TransAtlantic Racing	5	-	-	5	-	-	-	-	-	-	-	-	-
25	Juan Carlos Carbonell	Chile	Qwik Cars	4	-	4	-	-	-	-	-	-	-	-	-	-
26	Akira Ishikawa	Japan	McCormack Racing	3	-	-	3	-	-	-	-	-	-	-	-	-
	Bob Dorricott Jr.	United States	Dorricott Racing	3	-	-	-	1	2	-	-	-	-	-	-	-
28	David Donohue	United States	PacWest Lights	2	-	-	2	-	-	-	-	-	-	-	-	-

== Complete Overview ==
first column of every race	10	= grid position

second column of every race	10	= race result

R22=retired, but classified NS=did not start

Place	Name	Country	Team	(United States)		(United States)		(United States)		(United States)		(United States)		(United States)		(United States)		(Canada)		(United States)		(United States)		(Canada)		(United States)
1	Greg Moore	Canada	Forsythe Racing	1	1	7	1	1	1	5	1	4	1	2	2	1	1	1	1	1	1	3	1	1	5	1	1
2	Robbie Buhl	United States	Dorricott Racing	4	4	14	2	9	2	18	3	1	4	1	1	2	12	3	2	2	R22	1	3	2	3	3	21
3	Affonso Giaffone	Brazil	Brian Stewart Racing	8	8	2	5	12	R25	3	2	2	2	5	5	4	2	8	4	6	R23	17	6	12	4	2	2
4	Doug Boyer	United States	Summitt Motorsports	5	5	16	4	2	R22	10	5	15	9	9	8	11	8	2	3	5	3	13	9	6	2	6	3
5	Pedro Chaves	Portugal	Mark Weida Leading Edge Racing	3	3	8	R14	10	5	13	9	9	10	10	21	9	6	15	R19	4	2	2	4	3	1	8	4
6	Buzz Calkins	United States	Bradley Motorsports	9	9	4	3	16	16	6	4	6	3	7	7	10	5	12	8	12	5	8	R17	11	11	14	13
7	Mark Hotchkis	United States	Mark Weida Leading Edge Racing	18	R20	11	7	13	R17	4	R18	5	5	13	10	15	9	9	6	10	4	4	5	13	13	5	9
8	Jeff Ward	United States	Arizona Motorsports	2	2	19	12	5	7	7	7	10	6	3	3	16	R14	16	18	9	11	-	-	-	-	16	10
9	Nick Firestone	United States	Brian Stewart Racing	12	10	18	11	6	12	20	R19	13	15	4	4	5	3	5	R23	13	10	14	10	4	9	7	5
10	David DeSilva	United States	Genoa Racing	10	R21	10	R16	3	3	2	15	7	7	11	11	6	R16	14	9	22	9	7	11	10	12	12	R23
11	Alex Padilla	United States	Mark Weida Leading Edge Racing	15	11	3	R15	4	4	11	R6	-	-	-	-	7	17	-	-	-	-
11	Alex Padilla	United States	Team Medlin																			?	NS	18	6	18	11
12	Mike Borkowski	United States	Team Medlin	-	-	-	-	-	-	8	11	3	8	8	9	14	4	11	10	7	8	-	-	-	-	-	-
13	Claude Bourbonnais	Canada	Forsythe Racing	7	7	1	R22	8	R15	?	NS	-	-	-	-	-	-	-	-	-	-	6	2	5	R19	11	7
	Diego Guzman	Colombia	Dick Simon Racing	11	R22	6	R21	11	R18	9	8	16	13	6	6	8	R19	10	R22	11	7	?	NS
	Diego Guzman	Colombia	PacWest Lights																					14	8	13	8
15	José Luis Di Palma	Argentina	McCormack Racing	6	6	-	-	-	-	-	-	-	-	17	13	13	7	7	5	15	15	9	13	8	R20	10	R25
16	Bertrand Godin	Canada	Forsythe Racing	-	-	-	-	-	-	-	-	-	-	20	14	3	11	6	7	3	6	-	-	-	-	-	-
	Trevor Seibert	Canada	Forsythe Racing	-	-	-	-	-	-	-	-	?	NS	-	-	-	-	13	R20	8	R18	10	8	7	10	4	6
18	Bob Reid	United States	Derrick Walker Racing	17	16	21	R19	19	6	16	14	17	14	18	16	17	13	17	14	17	13	15	14	17	7	20	12
19	Jeff Andretti	United States	Canaska Racing	16	15	9	NS	14	R20	12	10	12	R19	15	12	-	-	4	11	23	R20	5	7	-	-	-	-
20	Niko Palhares	Brazil	PacWest Lights	13	12	5	6	7	R24	19	13	-	-	-	-	-	-	-	-	-	-	-	-	-	-	-	-
21	Peter Faucetta Jr.	United States	FRE Racing	19	R23	17	R20	22	9	14	R16	11	12	16	15	18	18	18	12	14	12	12	12	19	R17	19	19
22	David LaCroix	United States	Dick Simon Racing	?	NS	15	10	18	14	15	12	14	R18	19	20	19	10	21	R24	21	R21	-	-	20	15	24	18
23	Beaux Barfield	United States	Breezley Motorsports	-	-	13	8	25	R19	-	-	-	-	-	-	-	-	-	-	-	-	-	-	-	-	-	-
	Enrique Contreras	Mexico	TransAtlantic Racing	14	13	-	-	15	8	-	-	-	-	12	R22	-	-	-	-	18	14	-	-	15	R18	17	R26
25	Juan Carlos Carbonell	Chile	Qwik Cars	20	19	12	9	-	-	-	-	-	-	-	-	-	-	-	-	-	-	-	-	-	-	-	-
26	Akira Ishikawa	Japan	McCormack Racing	-	-	-	-	20	10	-	-	-	-	-	-	-	-	-	-	-	-	-	-	-	-	-	-
	Bob Dorricott Jr.	United States	Dorricott Racing	21	R24	-	-	17	R21	1	R17	8	11	14	17	12	R21	19	13	19	16	?	NS	9	16	9	20
28	David Donohue	United States	PacWest Lights	-	-	-	-	24	11	?	NS	-	-	21	18	-	-	20	R16	16	19	11	15	-	-	-	-
-	Jack Miller	United States	McCormack Racing	24	18	10	13	23	R23	17	R20	19	17	22	19	21	R20	23	15	20	17	?	NS	-	-	-	-
-	Rick Hill	United States	K.O.T. Racing	-	-	18	R18	21	13	-	-	-	-	-	-	-	-	-	-	-	-	-	-	-	-	-	-
-	Paul Dallenbach	United States	McCormack Racing	-	-	-	-	-	-	-	-	-	-	-	-	-	-	-	-	-	-	-	-	16	14	22	16
-	Chris Simmons	United States	Sotare Motorsports	22	14	?	NS	-	-	-	-	-	-	-	-	-	-	-	-	-	-	-	-	-	-	-	-
-	Gianfranco Cané	Mexico	?	-	-	-	-	-	-	-	-	-	-	-	-	-	-	-	-	-	-	-	-	-	-	25	14
-	Harry Puterbaugh	United States	McCormack Racing	-	-	22	R17	-	-	?	NS	18	16	-	-	22	15	-	-	-	-	16	16	-	-	-	-
-	Chris Smith	United States	?	-	-	-	-	-	-	-	-	-	-	-	-	-	-	-	-	-	-	-	-	-	-	21	15
-	Cam Binder	Canada	K.O.T. Racing	23	17	-	-	-	-	-	-	-	-	-	-	20	R22	22	R21	-	-	-	-	21	R21	23	R22
-	Sohrab Amirsardari	Canada	McCormack Racing	-	-	-	-	-	-	-	-	-	-	-	-	-	-	24	R17	-	-	-	-	-	-	-	-
-	Zak Brown	United States	Sotare Motorsports	-	-	-	-	-	-	-	-	-	-	-	-	-	-	-	-	-	-	-	-	-	-	26	17
-	Aaron Hsu	United States	Summitt Motorsports	-	-	-	-	-	-	-	-	-	-	-	-	-	-	-	-	-	-	-	-	-	-	15	R24
-	Davey Hamilton	United States	Dick Simon Racing	-	-	?	NS	-	-	-	-	-	-	-	-	-	-	-	-	-	-	-	-	-	-	-	-
