= Jaguar XK (X100) =

Grand Tourer by Jaguar from 1996–2006

Jaguar XK8; Jaguar XKR
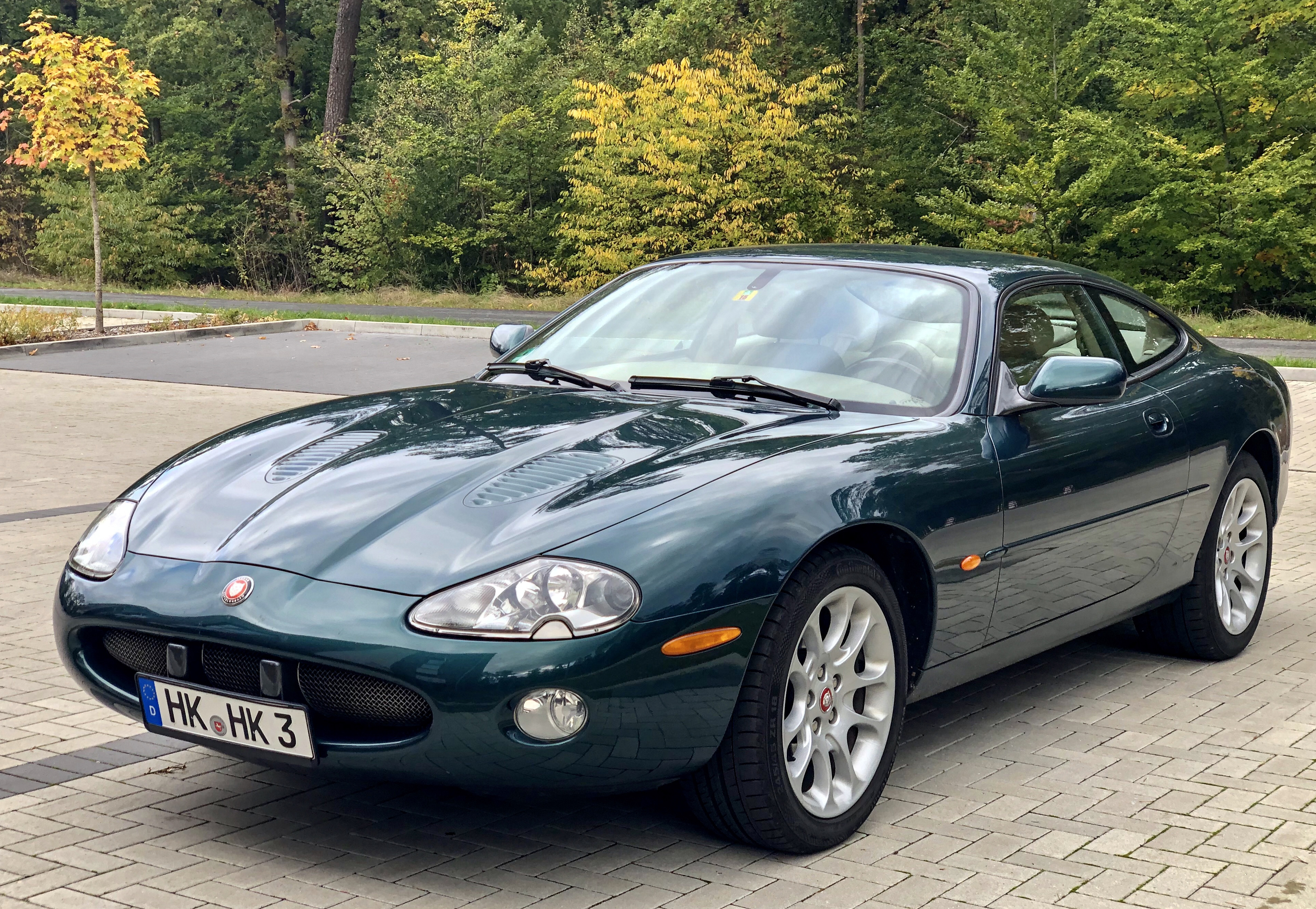
- Jaguar XKR Coupé

Overview
- Manufacturer: Jaguar Cars
- Model code: X100
- Production: 1996 – May 2005
- Assembly: United Kingdom: Coventry (Browns Lane plant)
- Designer: Fergus Pollock under Geoff Lawson (1992)

Body and chassis
- Class: Grand tourer (S)
- Body style: 2-door coupé; 2-door convertible
- Layout: Front-engine, rear-wheel drive
- Platform: Jaguar XJS (modified)
- Related: Aston Martin DB7; Jaguar XJ (X308)

Powertrain
- Engine: 4.0 L AJ26/27 V8; 4.0 L AJ26S supercharged V8; 4.2 L AJ34 V8; 4.2 L AJ34S supercharged V8
- Transmission: 5-speed ZF 5HP24 automatic (1996–2002; naturally aspirated models); 5-speed Mercedes-Benz W5A580 5G-Tronic automatic (1998–2002; Supercharged models only); 6-speed ZF 6HP26 automatic (2002–2005)

Dimensions
- Wheelbase: 2,588 mm (101.9 in)
- Length: 1996–2004: 4,760.0 mm (187.4 in); 2005–2006: 4,775 mm (188.0 in)
- Width: 1996–2004: 1,830 mm (72.0 in); 2005–2006: 1,800 mm (70.9 in)
- Height: 1996–1998 Coupe and 1999–2006 XK8 Convertible: 1,295 mm (51.0 in); 1996–1998 Convertible: 1,305 mm (51.4 in); XKR Convertible: 1,288 mm (50.7 in); 1999–2006 XK8 Coupé: 1,283 mm (50.5 in); XKR Coupe: 1,278 mm (50.3 in)

Chronology
- Predecessor: Jaguar XJS
- Successor: Jaguar XK (X150)

The Jaguar XK8 (project code X100) is a grand tourer launched by Jaguar Cars in 1996, and was the first generation of a new XK series. The XK8 was available in two-door coupé or two-door convertible body styles with the new 4.0-litre Jaguar AJ-V8 engine. In 1998, the XKR was introduced with a supercharged version of the engine. In 2003, the engines were replaced by the new 4.2-litre AJ34 engines in both the naturally aspirated and supercharged variations. The first-generation of the XK series shares its XJS-derived platform with the Aston Martin DB7, with both cars tracing their history back to an abandoned Jaguar development study in the mid-1980s known as XJ41/XJ42, which had been mooted to be known as the F-Type.

One of the revisions is the use of the second generation of Jaguar's independent rear suspension unit, taken from the Jaguar XJ (XJ40). Development began in 1992, with design work starting earlier in late 1991. By October 1992 a design was chosen and later frozen for production in 1993. Prototypes were built from December 1993 after the X100 was given formal approval and design patents were filed in June 1994. Development concluded in 1996, with the car being unveiled in March of that year and going on sale from October 1996.

== XJ41/XJ42 concept (1986) ==
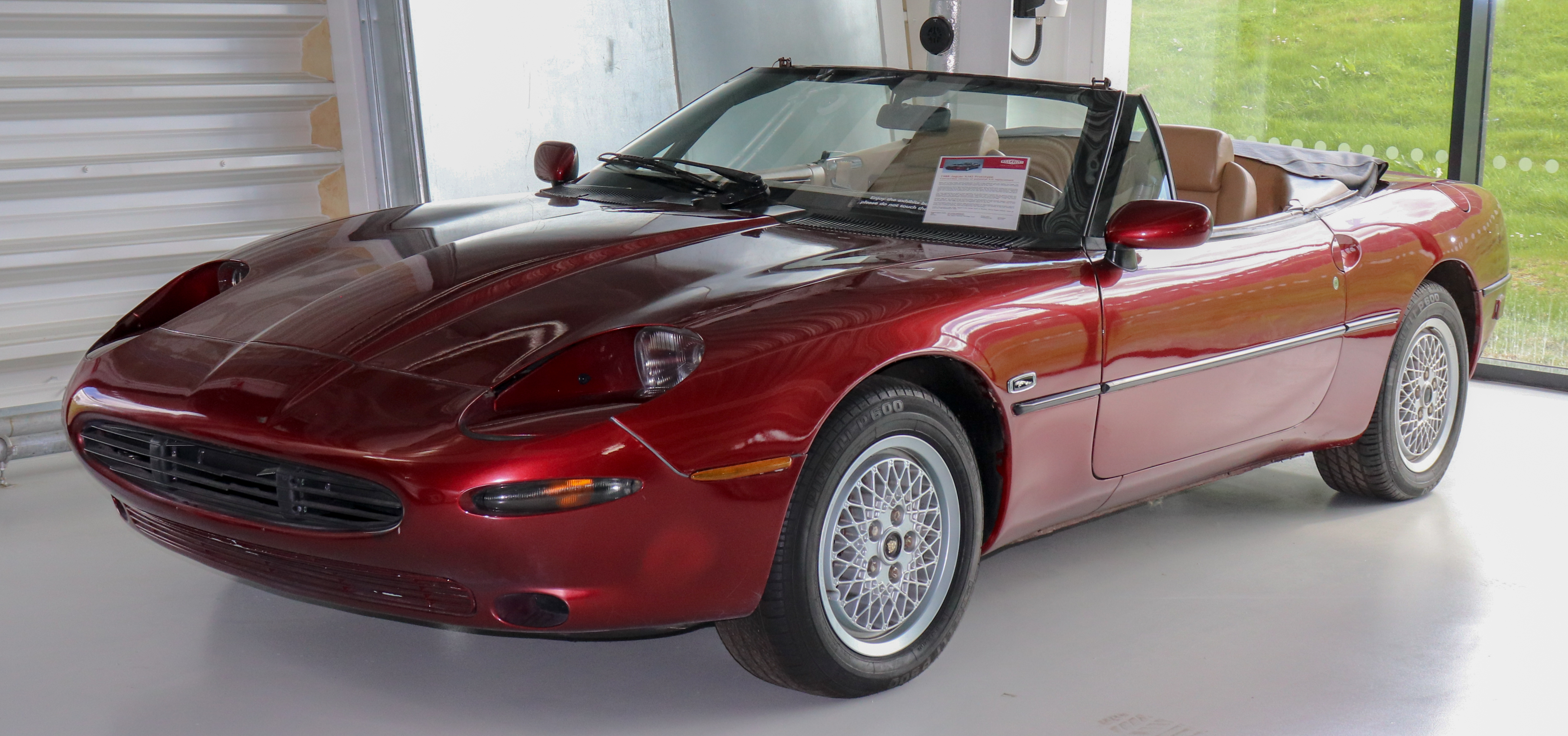
Jaguar XJ42 concept displayed in the British Motor Museum, Gaydon

The stylistic predecessors of the XK8 were a pair of completely unrelated concepts as far back as 1982, when Jaguar realised that the XJ-S had grown too large in size and weight to be classed as a proper successor to the E-Type. Then, two new projects, codenamed the XJ41 (coupé) and XJ42 (convertible) got to an advanced state of development. However, the project was cancelled when Ford Motor Company took over Jaguar in 1989, and the newly installed management determined that upgrading the company's dated production facilities was a higher priority. The XJ-S was given a major facelift (being renamed the XJS) instead as a stop gap solution. The XJ41/XJ42 studies ultimately evolved into the Aston Martin DB7 and the Jaguar XK8 which were launched in 1994 and 1996 respectively.

== History and specifications ==
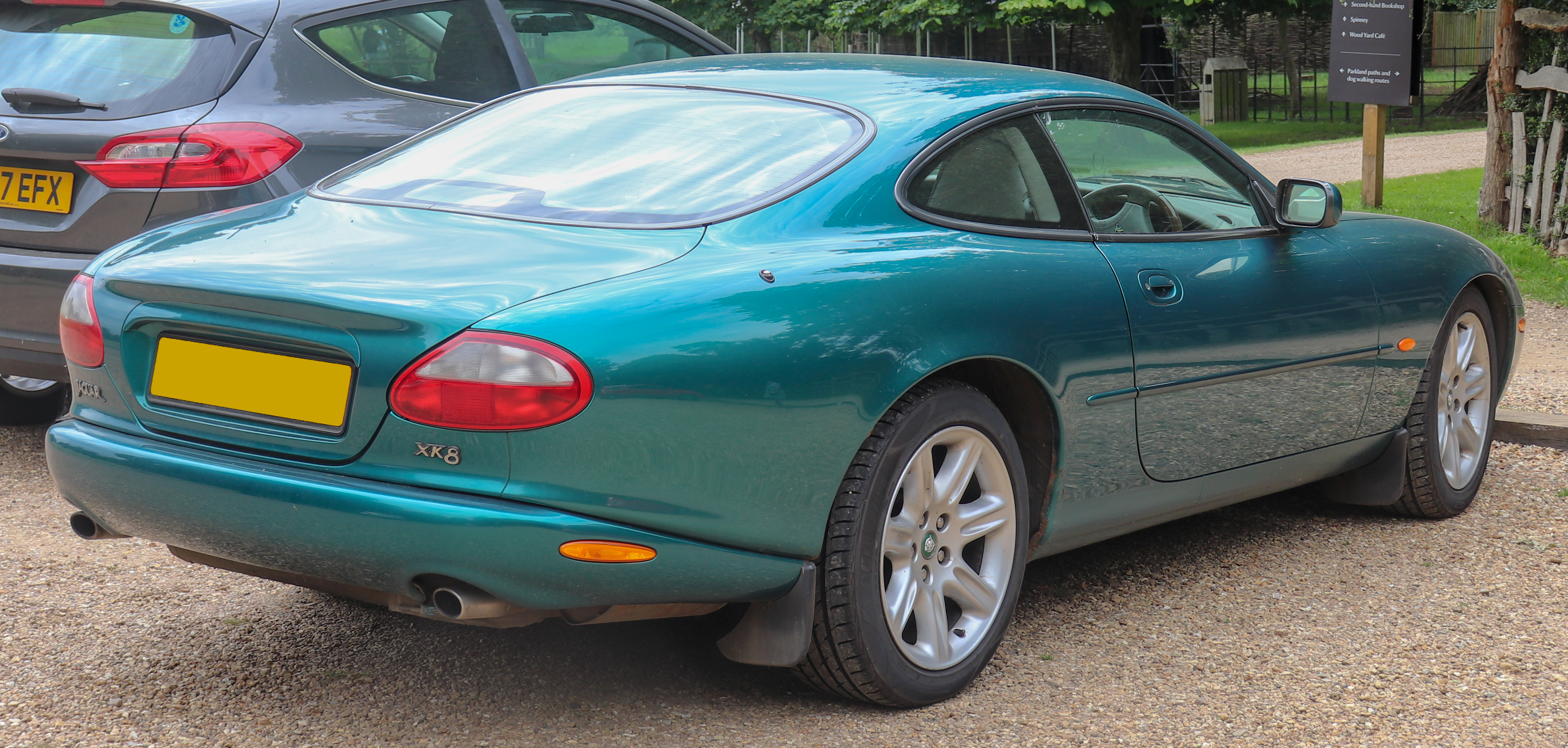
XK8 coupé

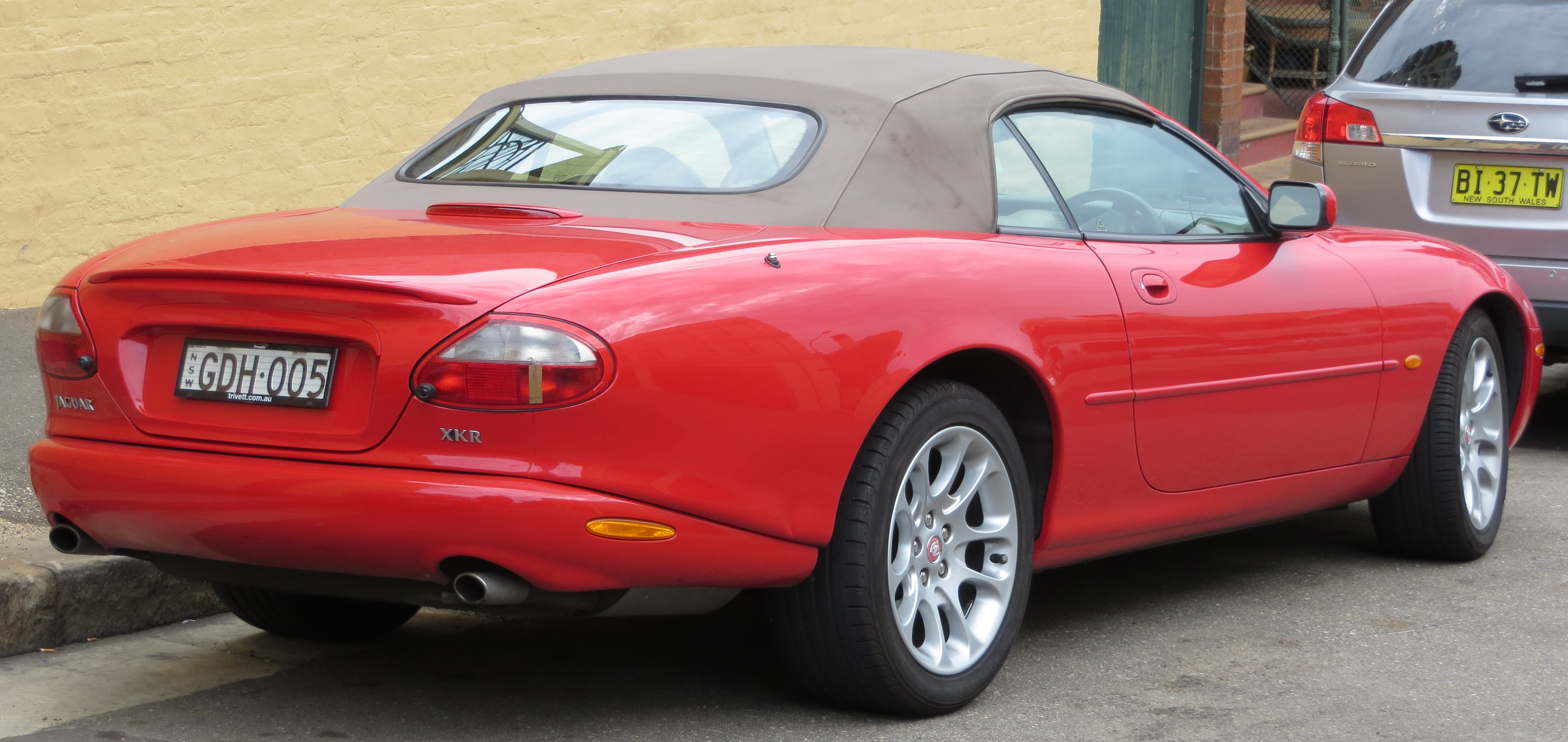
XKR convertible

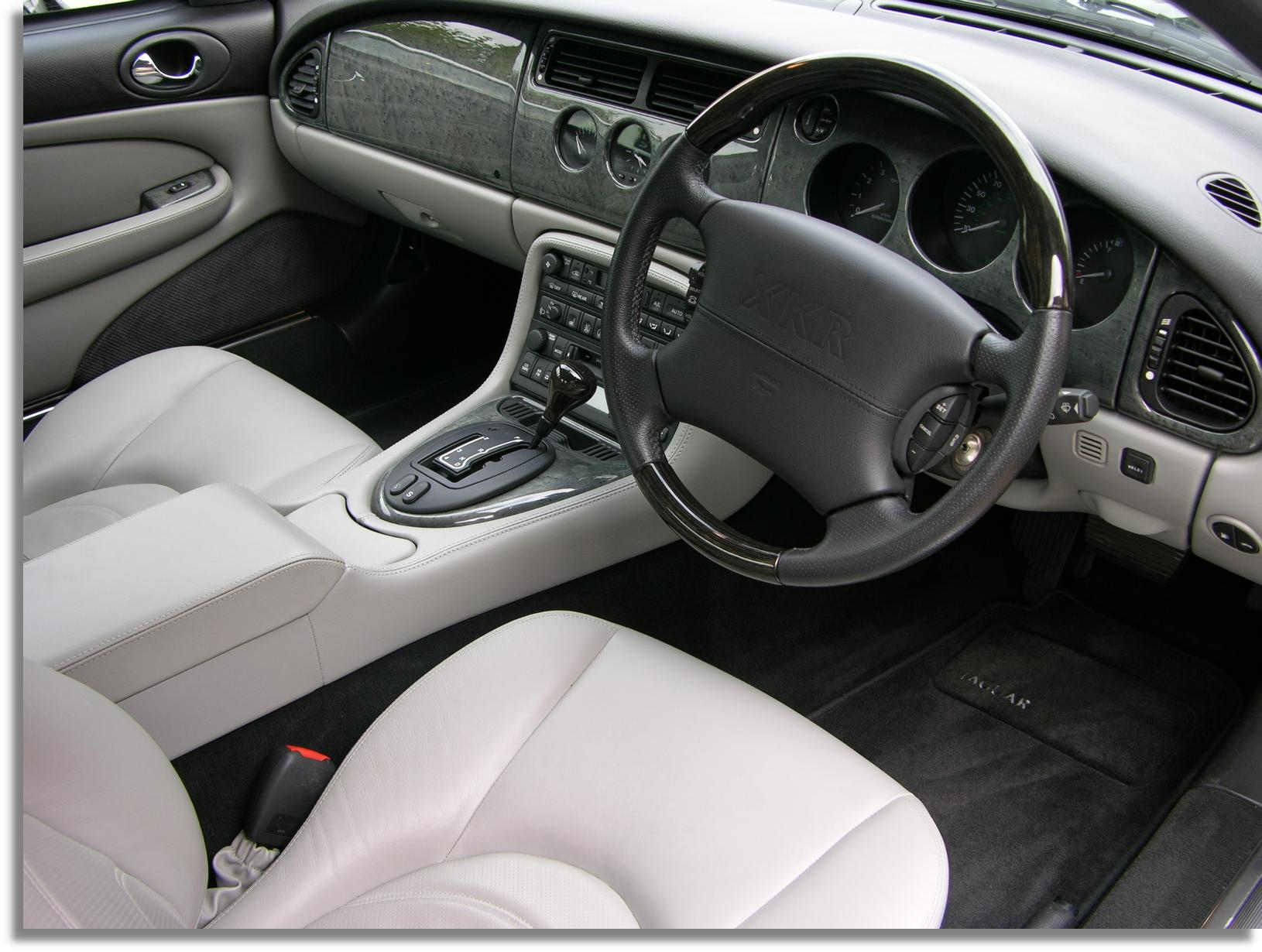
Interior

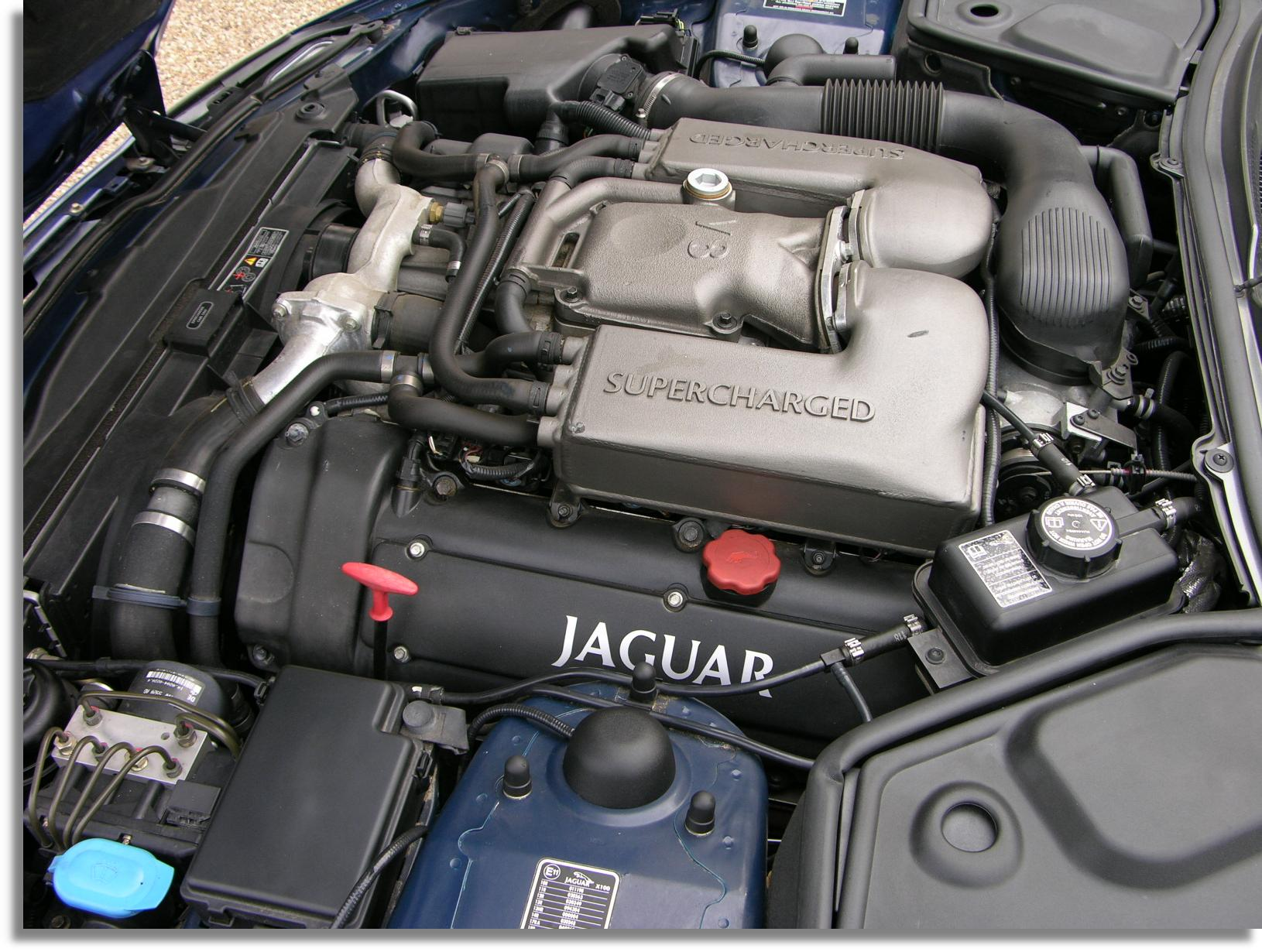
The 4.0 L Supercharged V8 engine

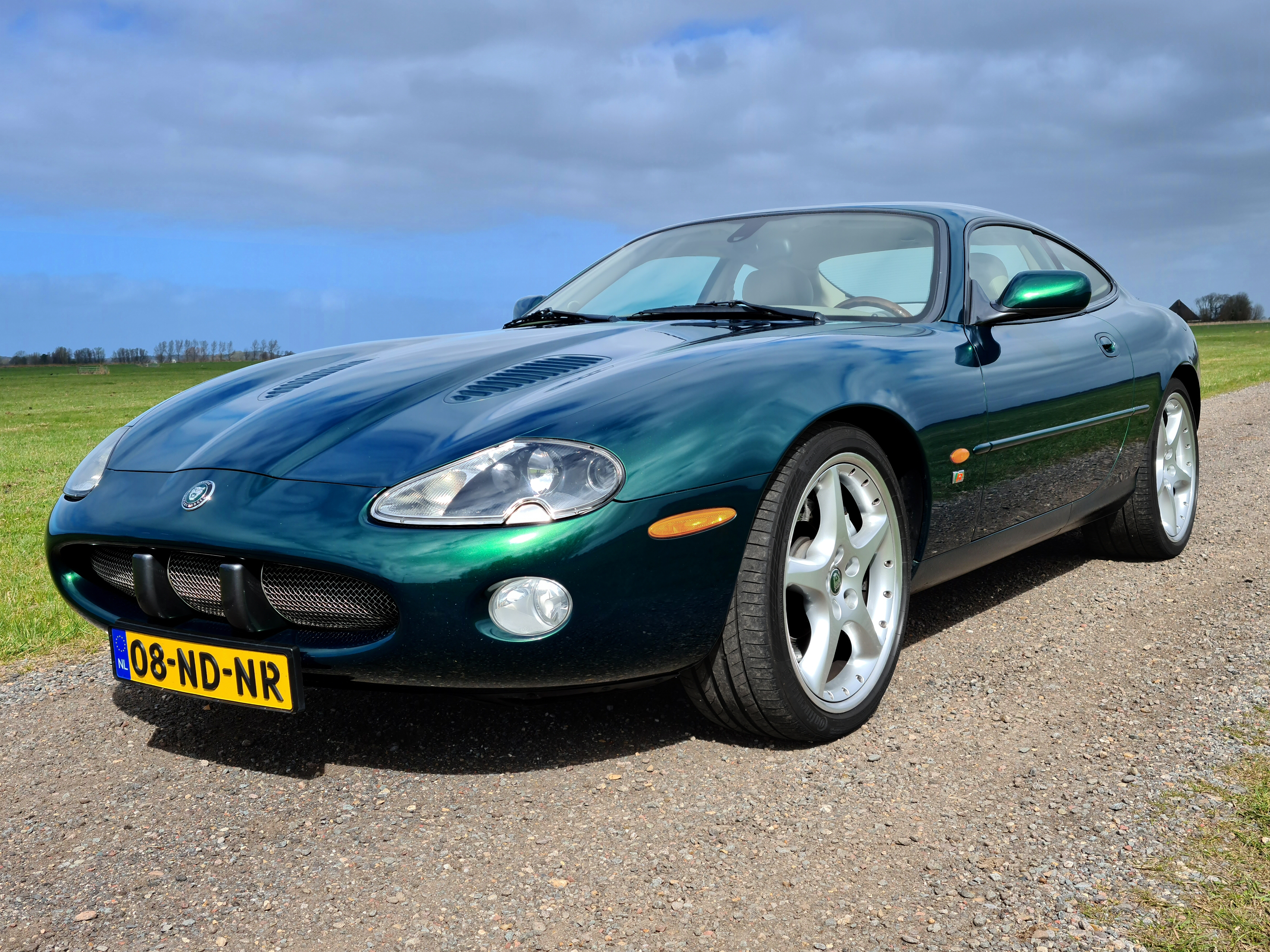
A 2003 Jaguar XKR with the black inlay in the headlights

The initial model available in the XK range of grand tourers was the XK8 coupé and convertible which were later joined by the more powerful XKR models. The XK8 used the new 4.0-litre 32-valve Jaguar AJ-V8 engine and was available in a two-door coupé and two-door convertible bodystyles. The new CATS (Computer Active Technology Suspension) adaptive suspension, which was already an option on the coupé, was added to the convertible models in 1997. Other changes for 1997 were the addition of light sensitive headlamps and an automatically dipping rear view mirror.

The XKR, which was introduced in May 1998, used a supercharged variant of the V8 engine used in the XK8 which is also shared with the XJR albeit with a few air-to-water intercooler modifications and a two-piece drive shaft. The supercharger is a 1.8 L (112 cu in) Eaton unit shared with the Ford F-150 SVT Lightning pickup. The supercharger spins at 1.9 times the engine's speed and has 11.9 pounds of boost pressure. Other visual differences from the XK8 include a small rear spoiler and bonnet louvres on the bonnet for improved engine airflow along with a meshed front grille.

From 1998 onwards, all models of the XK lineup were fitted with the Servotronic II power steering. From late 1999, an optional R kit became available for the XKR which included a stiffer suspension system and gold coloured wheels. Since at least 2000, a GPS system was available as an option on all XK models which replaced the three gauges on the centre console.

The XK range received a mechanical update in 2002 with the engines in both the XK8 and XKR models being enlarged to 4.2-litres, the front headlamps were also updated by the addition of a clear lens. Further changes included new exterior colours and wheels along with different badging. The models were revised again in spring 2004 and notable changes included new wheel designs, bigger front and rear spoilers and a redesigned grille.

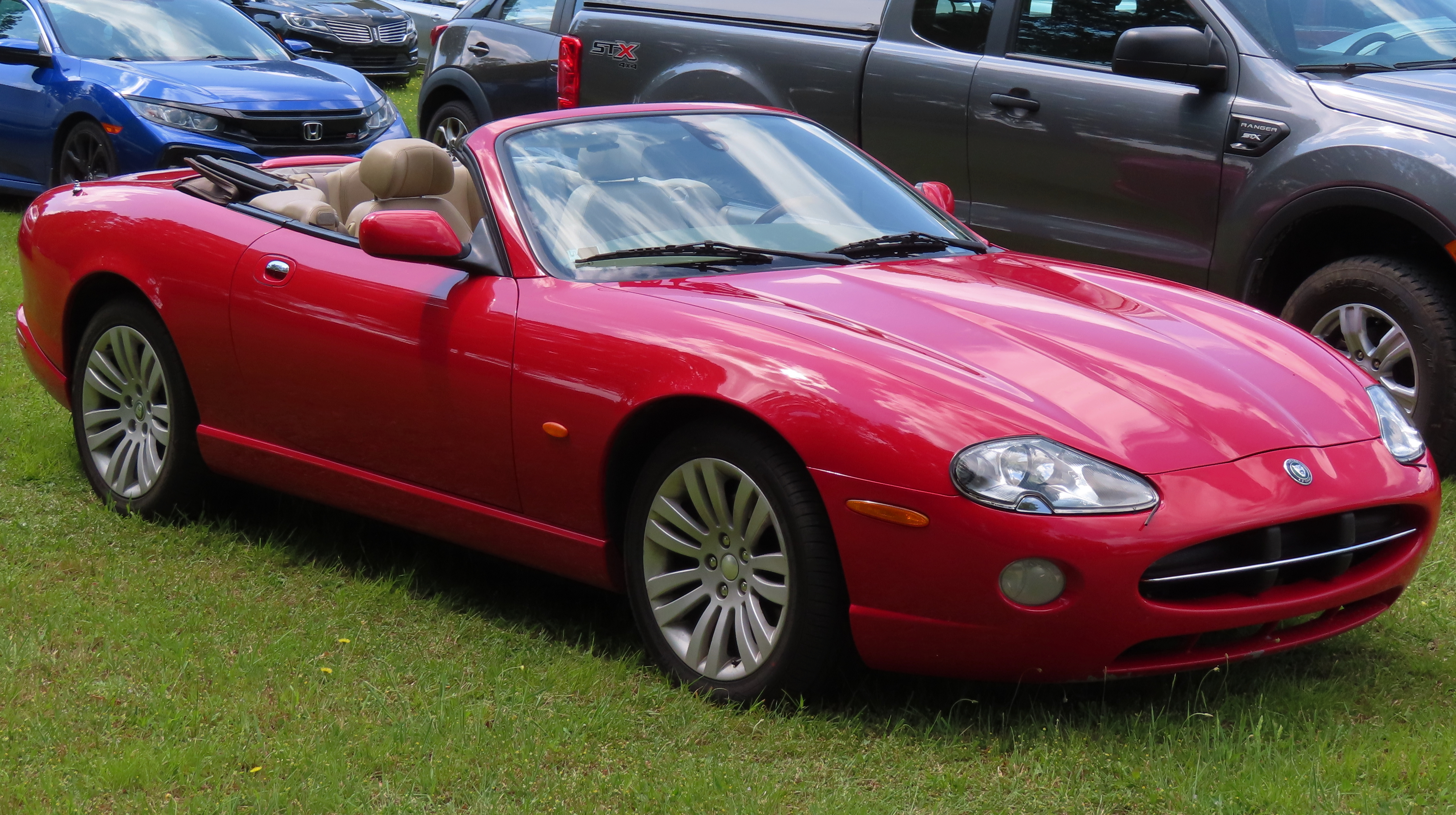

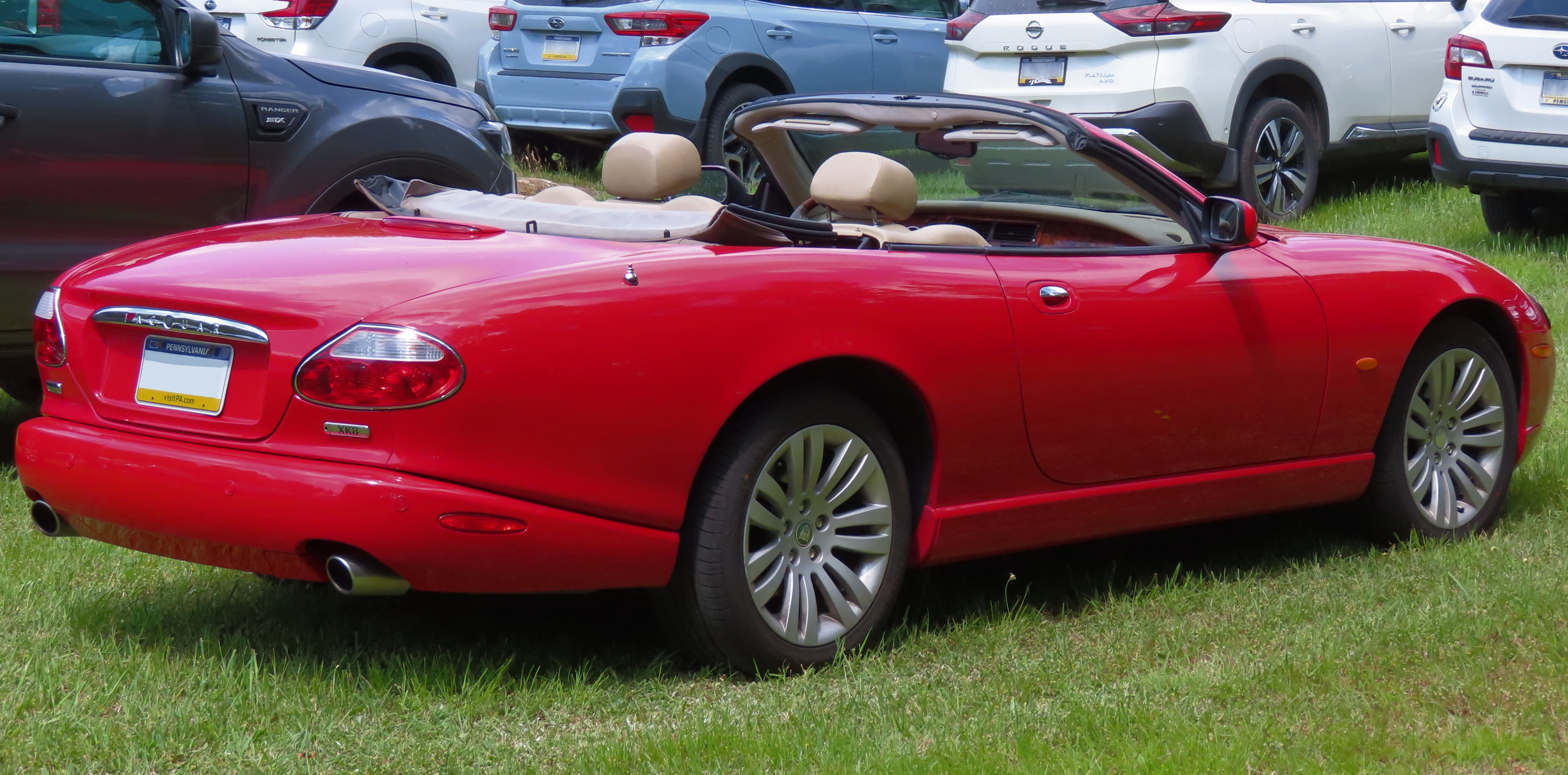
Post-2004 styling

Both the XK8 and XKR are electronically limited to a maximum speed of 250.1 km/h (155.4 mph). The XK8 came standard with 17-inch alloy wheels, while 18-inch (Standard on the XKR), 19-inch, and 20-inch wheels were available for additional cost. The XKR models used Pirelli P Zero tyres measuring 245/45ZR-18 at the front and 255/ 45ZR-18 at the rear. Jaguar's Adaptive Cruise Control, introduced in late 1999, is an optional feature available on both models. Both the two-door coupé and two-door convertible came with an all-leather interior, burl walnut trim, and side airbags. The interior was available in two trims, classic and sport. The sport interior trim was aimed for younger buyers and featured an interior designed by Karen Anderson which involved leather upholstery with cloth seats. The classic trim was a more luxurious option and featured heavy use of leather. Jeremy Clarkson, during a Top Gear test-drive, likened the interior of the original XK8 to sitting inside Blenheim Palace, although reviewers have criticized the high seating position and the improper gauge layout of the interior.

Like its predecessor, the XJS, the XK models use a 2+2 seating layout for the interior. Compared to the XJS, the XK models are 25 per cent stiffer and have a more responsive powertrain.

Initially, the ZF 5HP24 five-speed automatic transmission was coupled to the conventionally aspirated 4.0-litre model and a Mercedes W5A580 five-speed transmission to the Supercharged version, but in 2002 the new ZF 6HP26 six-speed automatic transmission was fitted in both versions of the 4.2-litre model.

Model	Years	Displacement	Gearbox	Peak power	Peak torque	Top speed	Accel. 0–97 km/h
XK8	1996–2002	3,996 cc (243.9 cu in)	5-speed automatic	216 kW (290 hp) at 6,100 rpm	290 lb⋅ft (393 N⋅m) at 4,250 rpm	251 km/h (156 mph) (limited) (Coupé); 248 km/h (154 mph) (limited) (Convertible)	6.7 seconds (Coupé); 7 seconds (Convertible)
XKR	1996–2002	3,996 cc (243.9 cu in)	5-speed automatic	276 kW (370 hp) at 6,150 rpm	387 lb⋅ft (525 N⋅m) at 3,600 rpm	250 km/h (155.4 mph) (limited)	5.4 seconds (Coupé); 5.6 seconds (Convertible)
XK8 4.2	2002–2006	4,196 cc (256.1 cu in)	6-speed automatic	224 kW (300 hp) at 6,000 rpm	310 lb⋅ft (420 N⋅m) at 4,100 rpm	250 km/h (155.4 mph) (limited)	6.4 seconds (Coupé); 6.6 seconds (Convertible)
XKR 4.2	2002–2006	4,196 cc (256.1 cu in)	6-speed automatic	298 kW (400 hp) at 6,100 rpm	408 lb⋅ft (553 N⋅m) at 3,500 rpm	250 km/h (155.4 mph) (limited)	5.4 seconds (Coupé); 5.6 second (Convertible)

== Limited editions ==
=== XKR Silverstone ===
Produced in celebration of Jaguar's 2000 entry in to Formula One (F1) racing. They featured unique platinum paint finish (only available on the Silverstone XKR), specific badges and tread plates, a high-performance package with the same engine as the standard XKR, but improved transmission, steering, suspension and brakes (Brembo 4-piston brakes with aluminium callipers stopping the car from 97 km/ to 0 in 103 feet (31 m)), 20-inch silver BBS wheels and a custom interior (red-stitched black leather and silver birds-eye maple wood). All possible factory options were included, with the exception of the telephone and the navigation system, which had to be ordered separately.

All Silverstone cars were manufactured in calendar year 2000, the last one being a coupé for the Japanese market built on 23 December 2000.

PHASE ONE: Based on the Model Year 2000 XKR. Only 100 Silverstone models were planned in Phase I. As it transpired, according to "Registre International des XKR Silverstone" these first 100 "phase one" cars totalled 102 in all, and were sold in the UK only. Phase I cars had fixed headrests and were all right-hand drive.

PHASE TWO: Based on the Model Year 2001 XKR but all built in 2000. A further production run of 500 cars was planned to satisfy demand from the United States and the rest of the world. Total "Phase Two" production eventually stood at 456, giving a total of 558 'Silverstone' cars. Phase Two UK cars had separate and adjustable headrests and were available in both right and left-hand drive.

=== XKR 100 ===
Built to celebrate the centenary of Jaguar's founder, 500 'XKR 100' coupés and convertibles combined total were made in 2002. The XKR 100 featured all the available options and an Anthracite paint finish, Recaro seats, 20-inch BBS alloy wheels, Brembo brakes, specific dark wood dashboard panels and GPS.

As it was produced only after 2001 all the engines were fitted with upgraded metal chain tensioners and water pump impellers, solving the common engine failures due to the weakness of plastic and semi-plastic tensioners.

=== XKR Portfolio ===
The convertible-only Portfolio models featured either red paint with matching Recaro sports seats and interior, or blue paintwork and interiors.

=== XKR 4.2-S ===
In Europe the 4.2-S was unveiled at the Geneva Motor Show on 1 March 2005. This was the last XK to be rolled out that was based upon the original 1996 design. Features for the 4.2-S included new exterior and interior colours and two distinct veneer options for the instrument panel, polished door treadplates with chequered-flag emblems and embossed, leather-edged floor mats. The revised white Jaguar badge on the bonnet also feature chequered accents. New unique 20-inch split rim BBS Perseus performance wheels plus cross-drilled Brembo brake discs, red wheel badges and red brake callipers were also fitted. The S gains firmer springs, dampers and anti-roll bars, steering is 10% quicker and the ride height has been lowered by 10mm. The electronic speed limiter was removed to enable the car to reach a top speed of 280 km/h (174 mph). Production was limited to only 200 cars in four new exclusive exterior colours – Copper Black Metallic, Frost Blue Metallic, Bay Blue Metallic and Satin Silver Metallic.

=== XKR-R concept ===
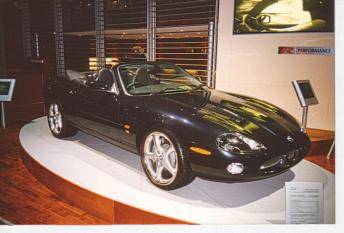
Jaguar XKR-R convertible

A concept car called the XKR-R which was very similar to the production XKR was produced in 2001 as a test bed for future Jaguar models. It boasted a more powerful 336 kW (451 hp) engine, a limited-slip differential, a 6-speed manual transmission and improved handling along with visual differences from a standard XKR which include a larger rear spoiler, a quad-pipe exhaust system, a fully functional front grille and larger five spoke alloy wheels. Two cars were made, an open top show car to be shown to the public and a functional test car having a coupé bodystyle. The test car featured a similar carbon fibre trim interior as the show car but had Recaro racing bucket seats with six point harness. Motoring journalist Tiff Needel tested the XKR-R test car in 2001 in an episode of Top Gear.

=== Carbon Fibre Edition ===
The Carbon Fibre Edition was one of Jaguar's most limited editions, with only 100 vehicles initially released in the UK in late 2004. In 2005, 200 Carbon Fibre Edition vehicles were produced for the USA market to commemorate SCCA Trans-Am racing successes (source: Jaguar promotional brochure). These vehicles were manufactured in only one configuration (XK8 convertibles) and were only available in one of four colour combinations: Ebony exterior over Charcoal interior; Platinum exterior over Ivory interior; Platinum exterior over Charcoal interior; and Slate exterior over Dove interior. Due to their very limited production, if a dealer was selected, they were authorised to receive only one for sale. The interiors featured dash, console and door elements made of carbon fibre rather than the traditional Jaguar wood, an XKR steering wheel, both gearstick and foot pedals from the XKR as well as XKR spoiler and enlarged exhaust tips. Nineteen inch cast alloy Atlas wheels were mounted. Xenon headlights were also featured. The 4.2L 294 horsepower V8 was capable of 0-60 mph in 6.3 seconds (source: Jaguar promotional brochure); the transmission was a six speed Mercedes-Benz unit (ZF6HP26) (source: Jaguar promotional brochure). A navigation system was additionally available.

Although production of the XK8/XKR ceased on Friday 27 May 2005, several Carbon Fibre Editions were registered as 2006 models in the USA. This was due to USA import/registration regulations.

=== Victory Edition ===
Introduced at the 2005 Los Angeles International Auto Show, the Victory Edition was offered in model year 2006, to "celebrate Jaguar's four championship wins in the North American Trans-Am road racing series and add to a successful lineage of special and limited edition XKs introduced since its launch," according to Jaguar's press statement. The statement went on to explain that "All four XK models – XK8 Coupe and Convertible and supercharged XKR Coupe and Convertible – will be offered as 'Victory' editions when the line-up goes on sale next summer. The new exterior styling changes introduced for the 2005 models continue to give the car a bolder, more aggressive and more muscular look." The Victory Edition was offered in all standard XK colours, plus four unique Victory Edition colours: Black Copper Metallic, Frost Blue Metallic, Bay Blue Metallic and Satin Silver Metallic. Victory Editions offered carbon fibre interior trim on XKR models, and a new Elm wood veneer on the XK8 models. Victory Editions also received special badging and accents. The "growler" badge on the bonnet had a unique checkered-flag background, and door sill plates featured checkered-flag emblems. Production of Victory Edition models was 1,050 cars.

=== Neiman Marcus Edition ===
In the 1996 Neiman Marcus Christmas catalog a 1997 XK8 special edition was offered.

== Production ==
Between 1996 and 2005, Jaguar built 90,064 XKs:

- 19,748 XK8 coupé
- 46,760 XK8 convertible
- 9,661 XKR coupé
- 13,895 XKR convertible
