= The Last Open Road =

1994 novel by B. S. Levy

- First edition
- Author: B. S. (Burt) Levy
- Language: English
- Series: The Last Open road
- Genre: Novel
- Publisher: Think Fast Ink
- Publication date: 1994, May 1998 (rev. ed)
- Publication place: United States
- Media type: Print (hardback)
- Pages: 354 pp
- ISBN: 0-9642107-0-3 (first edition, hardback)
- OCLC: 31737703
- Dewey Decimal: 813/.54 20
- LC Class: PS3562.E9245 L37 1994
- Followed by: Montezuma's Ferrari

The Last Open Road is a novel written by B.S. Levy, a long time amateur racer. It tells the story of a young mechanic from Passaic, New Jersey who becomes involved in automobile road racing during its peak in the 1950s. The book follows Buddy Palumbo, the main character, as he has to balance family life with working on cars. Buddy works mostly at a small gas station in his home town of Passaic, but also worked briefly at a foreign car shop in New York City.

The novel meanders through several real life race tracks, including Watkins Glen, Sebring, and Elkhart Lake (touching briefly on the creation of Road America near the end of The Fabulous Trashwagon) and also some real life races such as the Concourse de'Elegance at Elkhart Lake with some of the actual participants such as the three Cunningham's. Burt Levy's ability to create vivid characters, experiencing the world of amateur motorsports for the first time, and mixing that with historical detail are among the most engaging aspects of the story.

== Sequels ==
B. S. Levy has written six sequels to The Last Open Road: Montezuma's Ferrari, The Fabulous Trashwagon, Toly's Ghost, The 200 MPH Steamroller, The Italian Job, and Out of the Mist. Each story is written as fiction but the racing action is historically based. Levy weaved his fictional characters together with his knowledge and research into the worldwide racing scene of the 1950s and 60's to produce the novels.
