= Heartland Motorsports Park =

Racetrack in Topeka, Kansas

House of Speed

- Grand Prix Road Course (2004–2007)
- Location: Topeka, Kansas
- Coordinates: 38°55′35.82″N 95°40′34.31″W
- Owner: International Hot Rod Association (2025–present); Shelby Development, LLC (2015–2023)
- Opened: 1989 (first opening); 2026 (second opening)
- Closed: 2023
- Major events: Former: National Hot Rod Association; NHRA Heartland Nationals (1989–2019, 2021–2023); NASCAR Craftsman Truck Series; O'Reilly Auto Parts 275 (1995–1999); ChampCar Endurance Series (2012); AMA Superbike Championship (1989–1991, 2009); SCCA National Championship Runoffs (2006–2008); Trans-Am Series (1989, 2006); Mazdaspeed Miata Cup (2003); Star Mazda Championship (1999); NASCAR Winston West Series (1998); NASCAR Midwest Series (1998); SCCA Pro Racing World Challenge (1997–1998); NASCAR Southeast Series (1996–1997); ARCA Racing Series (1991–1992); IMSA GT Championship (1989–1991); Barber Pro Series (1989–1990)

Grand Prix Road Course (2008–2023)
- Surface: Asphalt
- Length: 2.500 mi (4.023 km)
- Turns: 14

Grand Prix Road Course (2004–2007)
- Surface: Asphalt
- Length: 2.500 mi (4.023 km)
- Turns: 14
- Race lap record: 1:39.558 ( (United States) Tomy Drissi, Jaguar XKR, 2006, Trans-Am)

Original Road Course (1989–2003)
- Surface: Asphalt
- Length: 2.500 mi (4.023 km)
- Turns: 14
- Race lap record: 1:27.880 ( (South Africa) Wayne Taylor, Intrepid RM-1, 1991, IMSA GTP)

1/4 Mile Dragstrip
- Surface: Concrete
- Length: 0.250 mi (0.402 km)

Autocross/Solo/Drift Pad
- Surface: Asphalt, 22 Acres

Heartland Motorsports Park, formerly known as Heartland Park Topeka, is a multi-purpose motorsports facility 8-mile (13 km) south of downtown Topeka, Kansas near the Topeka Regional Airport. It operated from 1989 until its closure in 2023. It was announced that the track will reopen in 2026.

== History ==
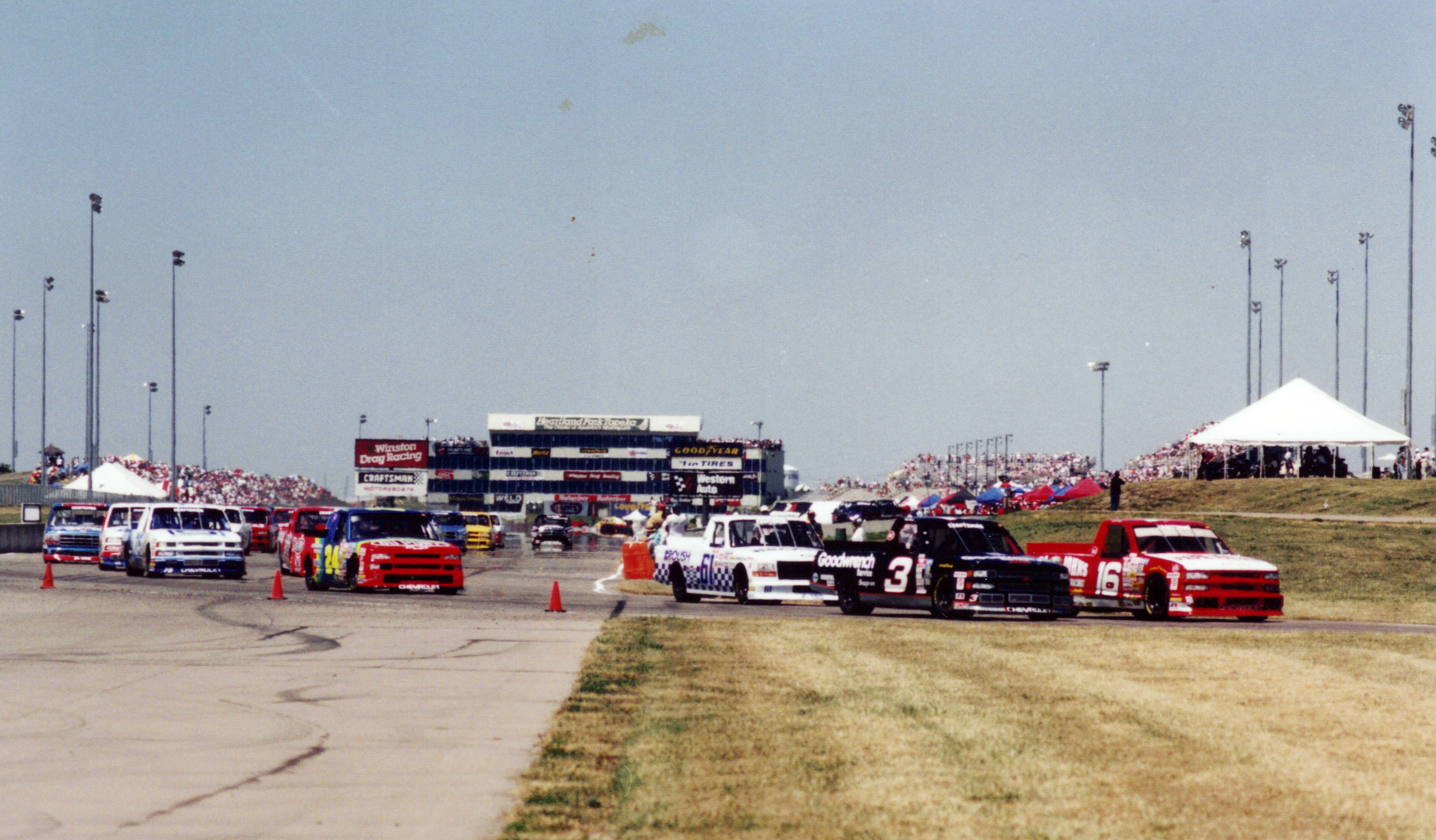
NASCAR Truck Series race at Heartland Park

When it opened in 1989, Heartland Motorsports Park was the first new auto racing facility to be built in the United States for 20 years. Its facilities include a road-race course with 4 possible configurations (ranging from 1.8 to 2.5 miles or 2.9 to 4.0 kilometres in length), a 3/8 mi (0.6 km) clay oval, off-road course and a 1/4 mi (0.4 km) drag strip. After several years of neglect from continual financial difficulties, the track surface and other facilities had deteriorated badly. The track's survival was in doubt until 2003, when Raymond Irwin, former owner (1986–2007) of Blackhawk Farms Raceway bought it and began major renovations.

In December 2015, Chris Payne and Todd Crossley of Shelby Development, LLC. purchased the track. Payne, the CEO of Shelby Development, became the track's sole owner in January 2017. It was announced in 2018 that Kansas City International Raceway and I-70 Speedway were bought by Payne, and would become sister tracks of Heartland.

Kenny Bernstein's NHRA Top Fuel dragster in 1996

The drag-strip was used by local clubs and the National Hot Rod Association. The road-course was mainly used by the SCCA, the National Auto Sport Association and marque-clubs. The track was the home of both the SCCA National Championship Runoffs and the Tire Rack SCCA Solo National Championships from 2006 to 2008. In the past, it has hosted ARCA, ASA, IMSA, AMA, the NASCAR Craftsman Truck Series' race: O'Reilly Auto Parts 275, NASCAR Winston West Series, NASCAR Midwest Series and the NASCAR Southeast Series.

The full 2.5 mile road course (and pit road) was completely repaved with a high-tech, polymer-enhanced asphalt in the fall of 2016.

On July 28, 2023 it was announced that due to tax disputes between the track owners and Shawnee County, the final running of the NHRA Nationals would be held August 11–13, 2023. On September 19, 2023 the track announced that it would be shutting down completely.

On December 30, 2025, International Hot Rod Association announced that they purchased the track and are planning on reopening it.

On July 10, 2026, the IHRA abruptly cancelled all remaining events for the Nitro Drag Racing Series, including those at Heartland Motorsports Park. Two days later, the facility was listed for sale by CBRE Group as a "data center redevelopment site". On July 13, it was confirmed the listing originated from early 2024, and pre-dated IHRA's acquisition of the track property. CBRE has since removed it from their website.

== Lap records ==
The fastest official race lap records at Heartland Motorsports Park Topeka are listed as:

Category	Time	Driver	Vehicle	Event
Grand Prix Road Course (2004–2007): 2.500 mi (4.023 km)
Trans-Am	1:39.558	Tomy Drissi	Jaguar XKR	2006 Heartland Topeka Trans-Am exhibition race
Original Road Course (1989–2003): 2.500 mi (4.023 km)
IMSA GTP	1:27.880	Wayne Taylor	Intrepid RM-1	1991 Camel Grand Prix
Formula Atlantic	1:35.819	Mark Dismore	Swift DB4	1989 2nd Heartland Topeka East Formula Atlantic round
IMSA GTP Lights	1:36.630	Parker Johnstone	Spice SE90P	1991 Camel Grand Prix
IMSA GTO	1:41.130	Robby Gordon	Mercury Cougar XR-7	1990 Camel Grand Prix
IMSA GTU	1:47.720	Bob Leitzinger	Nissan 240SX	1990 Camel Grand Prix
AAC	1:53.650	Kenny Irwin, Jr.	Buick Somerset	1990 Camel Grand Prix
