= Shannonville Motorsport Park =

Motorsport road course circuit in Belleville, Ontario

SMP
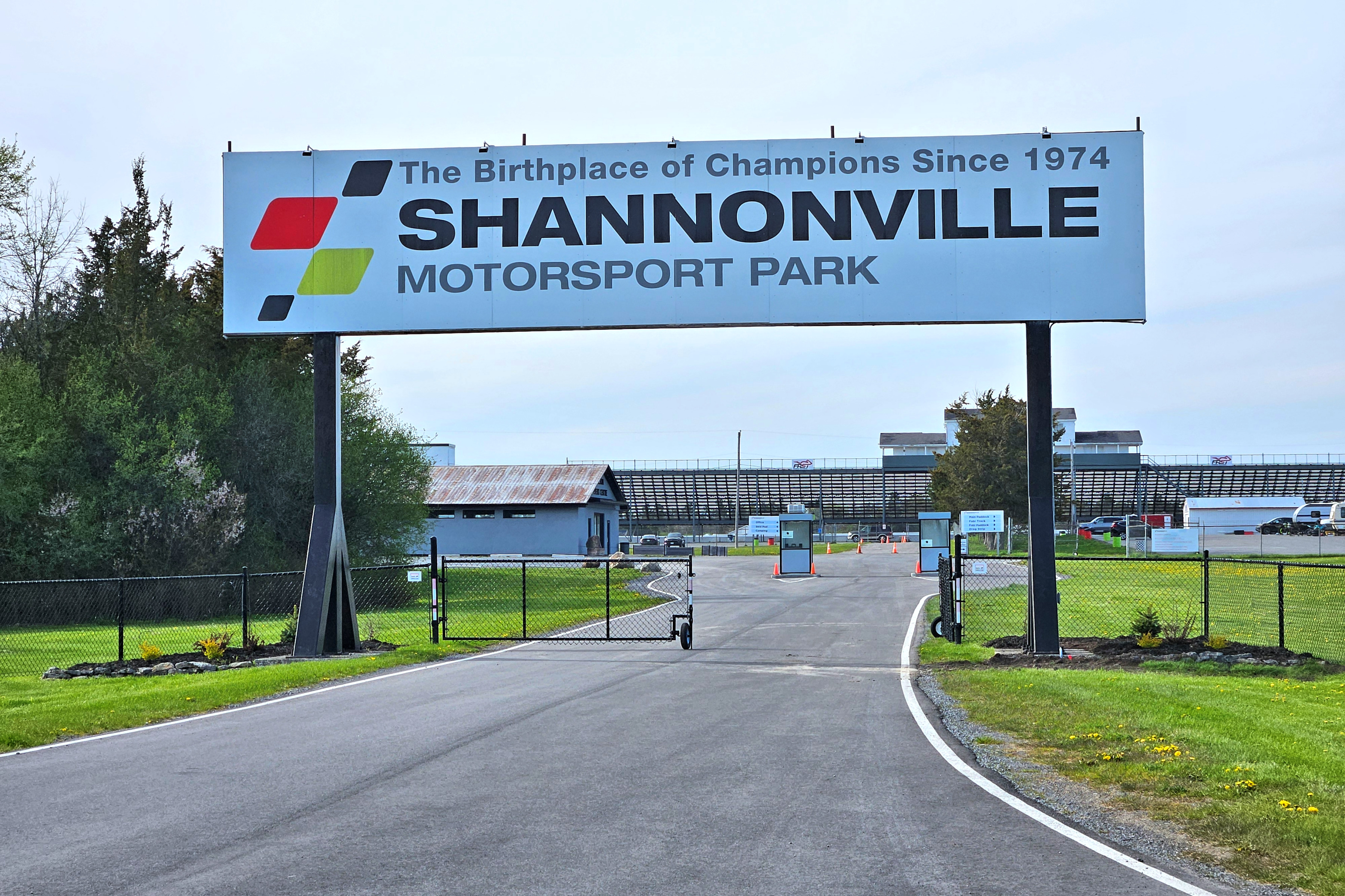
- Location: Shannonville, Ontario, Canada
- Coordinates: 44°13′31.44″N 77°09′36.00″W
- Owner: John Bondar and Steve Gidman
- Opened: 1974
- Major events: Current: Canadian Superbike Championship (1980–2009, 2011–2014, 2016–2019, 2023–present); Former: Canadian Touring Car Championship (2008–2009, 2014–2016, 2018–2020); CASCAR Super Series (1989–1991, 1995)

Long Circuit (1974–present)
- Length: 4.030 km (2.504 mi)
- Turns: 14
- Race lap record: 1:43.824 ( (Canada) Francis Martin, BMW S1000RR, 2010, SBK)

Pro Circuit (1974–present)
- Length: 2.470 km (1.535 mi)
- Turns: 9
- Race lap record: 1:04.327 ( (Canada) Jodie Christie, BMW S1000RR, 2014, SBK)

Fabi Circuit (1974–present)
- Length: 2.230 km (1.386 mi)
- Turns: 8

Nelson Circuit (1974–present)
- Length: 1.800 km (1.118 mi)
- Turns: 6

Drag Strip
- Length: 1/4 mi (0.40 km)

Shannonville Motorsport Park is a motorsport road course circuit in Canada. It is located 15 km (9.3 mi) east of Belleville, Ontario, roughly midway between Toronto and Montreal, Quebec, near Highway 401 and along the former Provincial Highway 2.

It has many configurations, and its tight layout with much run-off space makes it a very good venue for race testing. Many race teams from Toronto and Montreal test at Shannonville in preparation for events held on street circuits, as the Shannonville raceway shares a lot of the same characteristics.

The raceway first started off as a dirt oval, with bedrock for a front straight. Much later, the 1.800 km (1.118 mi) "Nelson" circuit was built, named after the late John Nelson, owner of the circuit at the time. From there, the 2.230 km (1.386 mi) "Fabi" circuit was built north of the Nelson, and the two were linked to form the 4.030 km (2.504 mi), 14-corner "Long Track". The Fabi circuit was named after Bertrand Fabi, a young Canadian driver who died while testing a Formula Three car in England. The Fabi circuit has a long backstraight that now doubles as a drag strip. A link was then made after the first corner on the Nelson circuit to the seventh corner of the Long Circuit, creating the 2.470 km (1.535 mi) "Pro Circuit" layout.

Currently, the Canadian Touring Car Championship makes an annual visit to the facility, as well as auto-racing body CASC (Regional Road Races) and the Canadian Superbike Championship. Drag racing is also heavily featured there.

== Lap records ==
As of October 2024, the fastest official race lap records at the Shannonville Motorsports Park are listed as:

Category	Time	Driver	Vehicle	Event
Long Circuit (1974–present): 4.030 km (2.504 mi)
Superbike	1:43.824	Francis Martin	BMW S1000RR	2014 Super Series RACE Super Series Round 1 (May 2010)
Supersport	1:44.617	Jodi Christie	Honda CBR600RR	2014 Super Series RACE Super Series Round 1 (May 2010)
GT4	1:48.455	Orey Findani	McLaren 570S GT4	2020 Shannonville CTCC round
Ferrari Challenge	1:49.485	Mario Guérin	Ferrari 458 Challenge	2018 Shannonville CTCC round
TCR Touring Car	1:49.767	Marco Circone	Audi RS 3 LMS TCR	2018 Shannonville CTCC round
Production vehicle	1:50.723	Brandon Cawker	Chevrolet Corvette (C7)	2023 SMP Lapping Day
Pro Circuit (1974–present): 2.470 km (1.535 mi)
Superbike	1:04.327	Jodie Christie	BMW S1000RR	Super Series2014 Race Super Series
Supersport	1:05.429	Andrew Nelson	Yamaha YZF-R6	Super Series 2008 Race Super Series
Ferrari Challenge	1:08.059	Mario Guérin	Ferrari 458 Challenge	2018 Shannonville CTCC round
GT4	1:08.188	Orey Findani	McLaren 570S GT4	2020 Shannonville CTCC round
TCR Touring Car	1:08.336	Gary Kwok	Honda Civic Type R TCR (FK8)	2020 Shannonville CTCC round

== Fatalities ==
- On May 21, 2000, Glenn Schauble was killed, mid-pack, after losing control during a celebratory wheelie, while crossing the finish-line. This was his second Superbike race as a professional. He flipped over backwards at the checkered flag on the front straight, fell off his bike, a Yamaha YZF-R1 1000, and was hit by several riders following in a tight pack. Schauble suffered fatal head and neck injuries. The accident happened at the end of the Pro Superbike race, during a R.A.C.E. (Racing Associates Canada Events) Ontario Superseries meeting held at Shannonville. A computer sciences student, Schauble was in his first year as a pro racer. He had been promoted to pro status after winning championships in two of the three classes in which he competed in 1999 (Amateur Formula Race and Amateur open).
- On September 24, 2000, Schauble's "best friend" Frank Wilson, Jr., also crashed at Shannonville on his regular Yamaha R6, in what he had intended to be his last race after seeing his friend Schauble die earlier that year and contemplating retirement. With the Canadian title already locked up for that season prior to that race, Wilson succumbed to his injuries at Kingston General Hospital. The incident happened after Wilson exited the pits for the 600 class warm-up lap. He crashed in Turn 2 of the Pro track in a single bike situation presumed to be due to highsiding on cold tires.

== See also ==
- List of auto racing tracks in Canada
