= Blackhawk Farms Raceway =

Private circuit racetrack in South Beloit, Illinois

BFR, The Farms
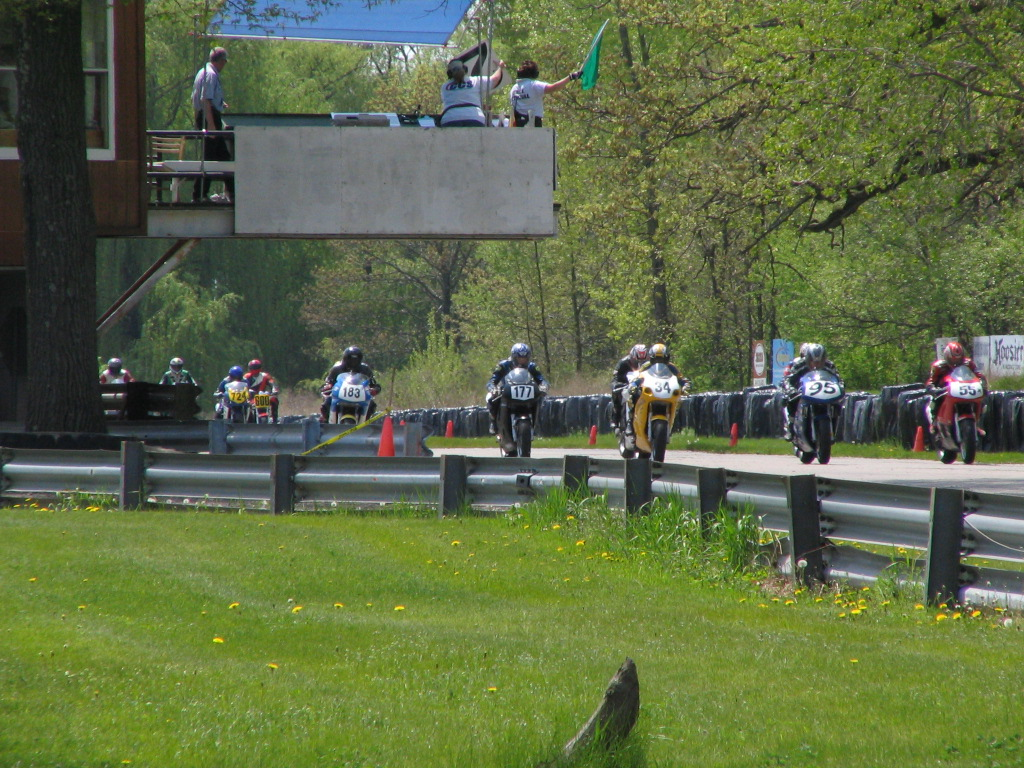
- Blackhawk Farms start/finish line.
- Location: Rockton Township, Winnebago County, at 15538 Prairie Rd. South Beloit, Illinois
- Coordinates: 42°29′51″N 89°6′54″W
- Capacity: Open seating, unlimited
- Owner: Paul Musschoot
- Opened: 1967
- Architect: Jerry Dunbar

Road Course
- Surface: Asphalt
- Length: 1.95 mi (3.14 km)
- Turns: 7

Blackhawk Farms is a 1.95-mile (3.14 km) private circuit racetrack located outside South Beloit, Illinois, on a 219-acre (0.9 km^{2}) farm on the border between Wisconsin and Illinois. Blackhawk Farms was established in 1967, about a decade after nearby Road America.

== History ==
Blackhawk Farms was designed by Jerry Dunbar and built in 1967 by Tito and Marcia Nappi. The Nappis owned and operated the track until its sale in 1986 to Mike and Raymond Irwin. The track was maintained and operated by the Irwins until its sale in August 2007 to Paul Musschoot, a local businessman and longtime SCCA racer and technical inspector. In 2008, many improvements were made to the track site including a brand new tech building, hospitality area with rooftop viewing, and Kohler-sponsored bathroom facility. Additional improvements included reducing the property's water table with added drainage and an onsite Frisby Performance tire dealer.

The track currently hosts events for the Midwestern Council, SCCA, VSCDA, SVRA, ASRA-CCS, and AHRMA. The Mid-American Racing Series was added to the schedule in 2021.

== Media reference ==
Blackhawk Farms' pit lane and front straight can be seen in the NFL Network's A Football Life episode featuring legendary running back Walter Payton. Payton is seen driving a Sports 2000 race car in the early stages of his post-NFL racing career.
