= 1990 USAC FF2000 Championship =

Car racing competition

1990 USAC FF2000 Championship season

Seasons
- ← none 1991 →

The 1990 USAC FF2000 Championship was the first season of the series. The series was sanctioned by the United States Auto Club and ran races in California and Arizona. Vince Puleo, Jr. won the inaugural championship in a Fast LG-1 entered by Fast Forward Racing.

== Race calendar and results ==
Round	Circuit	Location	Date	Pole position	Fastest lap	Winner
1	Willow Springs Raceway	(United States) Rosamond, California	April 22	(United States) Vince Puleo, Jr.		(United States) Vince Puleo, Jr.
2	Mesa Marin Raceway	(United States) Bakersfield, California	May 20			(United States) Bob Lesnett
3	Willow Springs Raceway	(United States) Rosamond, California	July 1	(United States) Vince Puleo, Jr.		(United States) Vince Puleo, Jr.
4	Cajon Speedway	(United States) El Cajon, California	July 4	(United States) Bob Lesnett		(United States) Bob Lesnett
5	Willow Springs Raceway	(United States) Rosamond, California	July 22	(United States) Bob Lesnett		
6	Infineon Raceway	(United States) Sonoma, California	August 26	(United States) Bob Lesnett		(United States) Vince Puleo, Jr.
7	Firebird International Raceway	(United States) Chandler, Arizona	September 29			(United States) Curtis Farley
8	Infineon Raceway	(United States) Sonoma, California	October 21	(United States) Tom Nields		(United States) Tom Nields
9	Phoenix International Raceway	(United States) Avondale, Arizona	November 11	(United States) Vince Puleo, Jr.		(United States) Vince Puleo, Jr.

== Final standings ==
Color	Result
Gold	Winner
Silver	2nd place
Bronze	3rd place
Green	4th & 5th place
Light Blue	6th–10th place
Dark Blue	11th place or lower
Purple	Did not finish
Red	Did not qualify (DNQ)
Brown	Withdrawn (Wth)
Black	Disqualified (DSQ)
White	Did not start (DNS)
Blank	Did not participate (DNP)
Blank	Driver replacement (Rpl)
Blank	Injured (Inj)
Blank	No race held (NH)

Rank	Driver	(United States) WSR1	(United States) MMR	(United States) WSR2	(United States) CAJ	(United States) WSR3	(United States) SON1	(United States) FIR	(United States) SON2	(United States) PIR	Points
1	(United States) Vince Puleo, Jr.	1	4	1	5	8	1	2	8	1	144
2	(United States) Bob Lesnett	4	1	3	1	2	2		2		121
3	(United States) Les Phillips										83
4	(United States) Randy McDaniel	2	2	4		7	7				67
5	(United States) Lars Dirks	8	5			9	13	4	9	7	64
	(United States) Dennis Ashbury								10	8	
	(United States) Daniel Benjamin	16		15		13					
	(Argentina) Claudio Burtin						11		7		
	(United States) Steven Campbell				9	12	12				
	(United States) Frank Carlone	11		10	12	15	17	11		13	
	(United States) Curtis Farley							1			
	(United States) Nick Firestone								4		
	(United States) Robbie Flock	5	6		3	18			15	2	
	(United States) Marcelo Gaffoglio							12			
	(United States) Jamie Galles	3		12	10		9		4		
	(United States) Carlos Garza	9		11			8				
	(United States) Gerry Gentry					10				14	
	(United States) Ron Gregory						16				
	(United States) Peter Hastrup	7					5		17		
	(United States) Kara Hendrick	15	7								
	(United States) Tony Hunt								8		
	(United States) Phil Katzakian							5	10		
	(United States) Darren Law							6		16	
	(United States) Jim Levi	13						7		11	
	(United States) Paul McKee	10		9	6	17	15	8		15	
	(United States) Steven Mullins	12		7		11	19				
	(United States) Dave Murvin							14			
	(United States) Tom Nields								1		
	(United States) Andy Paterson		12	17		4	6			5	
	(United States) Dennis Patterson	14	9	6	7	5	14	10		9	
	(United States) Kenneth Rodrigues	6	11								
	(United States) Dale Sexton, Jr.		10			6					
	(United States) Trevor Shaw	18		2	2				6		
	(United States) Bill Stern							5	11		
	(United States) Ed Stout						18	13	16	17	
	(United States) Craig Taylor									3	
	(United States) Gary Teed		13	8		14					
