= Curtis Farley =

Racing driver

Curtis Farley is a former racing driver and SCCA National Championship Runoffs winner.

== Racing career ==
Farley first qualified for the SCCA National Championship Runoffs in 1978 in the Formula Vee class. After three attempts in Formula Vee, Farley graduated into Formula Continental in 1980. Farley won the SCCA Midwest Division National championship Formula Continental class in a Zink Z14. At the Runoffs Farley raced an Argo JM2 Volkswagen, former Formula Super Vee, car. Farley passed polesitter Phil Rosette to win his only Runoffs national championship.

After years in Formula Vee and Formula Ford without major success, Farley focused on Formula Ford 2000 and SCCA Formula Continental. The US did not have a national F2000 series until 1990. He therefore competed in the national Canadian Formula 2000 Championship in 1985. His best result was a tenth place at the Grand Prix de Trois-Rivieres. Other talents, such as Cor Euser and Claude Bourbonnais, also competed in the race.

Farley also made a short stint in Formula Atlantic. He made six starts in 1987, 1988 and 1989 in the SCCA and ECAR Formula Atlantic championships. His best result was at the 1988 Grand Prix of Montreal finishing in third.

In Formula Continental, Farley again won the SCCA Midwest Division National in 1988. Racing with USAC Farley made his debut in the inaugural FF2000 Championship series at Firebird International Raceway winning the race. In 1991, Farley raced the full season in the USAC FF2000 Championship winning at Laguna Seca and scoring another three podium finishes. Farley finished fourth in the season standings, behind Greg Tracy, Randy McDaniel and champion Craig Taylor.

After his active racing career Farley was an engine builder for Formula Vee and various Ford powered racing series.

== Motorsports results ==
Year	Track	Car	Engine	Class	Finish	Start	Status
1978	Road Atlanta	Lynx B	Volkswagen	Formula Vee	16	28	Running
1979	Road Atlanta	Lynx B	Volkswagen	Formula Vee	9	19	Running
1980	Road Atlanta	Argo JM2	Volkswagen	Formula Continental	1	2	Running
1981	Road Atlanta	Citation-Zink	Volkswagen	Formula Vee	2	5	Running
1983	Road Atlanta	Citation-Zink Z16	Ford	Formula Ford	27	14	Not running
1984	Road Atlanta	Reynard 84F	Ford	Formula Ford	28	12	Running
1987	Road Atlanta	Swift SE3	Ford	Formula Continental	10	6	Running
1988	Road Atlanta	Swift SE3	Ford	Formula Continental	2	2	Running
1991	Road Atlanta	Citation	Ford	Formula Continental	26	17	Not running

=== American Open-Wheel racing results ===
(key) (Races in bold indicate pole position, races in italics indicate fastest race lap)

==== USAC FF2000 Championship results ====
Year	Entrant	1	2	3	4	5	6	7	8	9	Pos	Points
1990		WSR1	MMR	WSR2	CAJ	WSR3	SON1	FIR; 1	SON2	PIR	?	?
1991		TOP1; 13	SON; 2	MMR1; 5	TOP2; 2	LS1; 1	MMR2; 4	WSR; 3	LS3; 20	LS3; 5	4th	?

==== USAC FF2000 Western Division Championship ====
Year	Entrant	1	2	3	4	5	6	7	8	Pos	Points
1992		SON	MMR	IRP	LV; 6	WSR1; 4	TOP; 17	PIR	WSR2	?	?
