= 1992 USAC FF2000 Western Division Championship =

Car racing competition

The 1992 USAC FF2000 Western Division Championship was the third season of the series. It was the first season since the east/west split of the series by the United States Auto Club. Greg Moore won the series championship for Team Viper in a Swift DB-6

== Race calendar and results ==
Round	Circuit	Location	Date	Pole position	Fastest lap	Winner
1	Infineon Raceway	(United States) Sonoma, California	February 16	(United States) Tony Hunt		(United States) Greg Tracy
2	Mesa Marin Raceway	(United States) Bakersfield, California	April 18	(United States) Tony Hunt		(United States) Randy McDaniel
3	Indianapolis Raceway Park (Note: The race at Indianapolis Raceway Park was the "Night before the 500". This race was as a combined event, for both the USAC FF2000 Eastern and Western divisions.)	(United States) Brownsburg, Indiana	May 23	(United States) Mike Palumbo		(United States) Greg Tracy
4	Las Vegas Motor Speedway	(United States) Las Vegas, Nevada	June 20	(Canada) Greg Moore		(Canada) Greg Moore
5	Willow Springs Raceway	(United States) Rosamond, California	July 12	(United States) Randy McDaniel		(United States) Randy McDaniel
6	Heartland Park Topeka (Note: The race at Heartland Park Topeka was the "East-West Topeka Shootout". This race was as a combined event, for both the USAC FF2000 Eastern and Western divisions.)	(United States) Topeka, Kansas	August 1			(Canada) Greg Moore
7	Phoenix International Raceway	(United States) Avondale, Arizona	October 4	(Canada) Greg Moore		(Canada) Greg Moore
8	Willow Springs Raceway	(United States) Rosamond, California	November 1	(Canada) Greg Moore		(Canada) Greg Moore

== Final standings ==
Color	Result
Gold	Winner
Silver	2nd place
Bronze	3rd place
Green	4th & 5th place
Light Blue	6th–10th place
Dark Blue	11th place or lower
Purple	Did not finish
Red	Did not qualify (DNQ)
Brown	Withdrawn (Wth)
Black	Disqualified (DSQ)
White	Did not start (DNS)
Blank	Did not participate (DNP)
Blank	Driver replacement (Rpl)
Blank	Injured (Inj)
Blank	No race held (NH)

Rank	Driver	(United States) SON	(United States) MMR	(United States) IRP	(United States) LV	(United States) WSR1	(United States) TOP	(United States) PIR	(United States) WSR2	Points
1	(Canada) Greg Moore	5		3	1	13	1	1	1	
2	(United States) Greg Tracy	1	2	1	3	3		5	14	
3	(United States) Randy McDaniel		1		2	1		2	3	
4	(United States) Mike Palumbo	10	4	5	8	2	3	17	4	
5	(United States) Doug Boyer		6	6	4	5	20		2	
	(United States) Richard Brunt		15			11		10	13	
	(United States) Clay Collier					12	19	4		
	(United States) Brian Cunningham			10						
	(United States) Michael Dow								8	
	(United States) Curtis Farley				6	4	17			
	(United States) Keith Freber		16	22						
	(United States) Marcelo Gaffoglio	12	18					6		
	(United States) Joe Goetz		16				21			
	(United States) Michael Hughes	14								
	(United States) Tony Hunt	2	3	12		16		3	5	
	(United States) Peter Johantgen			14						
	(United States) Phil Katzakian	8	13							
	(United States) Jim Keeker			7						
	(United States) Steve Knapp			9						
	(United States) Bob Knox		10			8	5			
	(United States) Chuck Kurtz			DNQ						
	(United States) Jim Levi							11		
	(United States) Butch Matthews			DNQ						
	(United States) Corey Mayo			DNQ						
	(United States) Todd Mayo			DNQ						
	(United States) Paul McKee		12		7	9				
	(United States) Lance Mears	13	14		9	14		16	10	
	(United States) Wendell Miller						11			
	(United States) Hugh O'Neill		7							
	(United States) Andy Paterson	15	5			15		14		
	(United States) Jeff Sands			DNQ						
	(United States) Chris Schlarman							12		
	(United States) Mike Shank			24						
	(United States) Skip Streets		19	DNQ		10	16	8	12	
	(United States) Randy Tolliver			DNQ						
	(United States) Dennis Vitolo			23						
	(United States) Rick Watkins						13	9		
	(United States) Jeff Watson							13		
	(United States) Warren White			DNQ						
	(United States) Dwight Woodbridge			DNQ						
	(United States) Makoto Yamamura	16								
