= Jamie Galles =

American racing driver (born 1972)

- Nationality: American
- Born: February 3, 1972 (age 54) Albuquerque, New Mexico, U.S.
- Retired: 1996
- Relatives: Rick Galles (father)

Trans-Am Series
- Years active: 1994-1996
- Starts: 37
- Wins: 1
- Poles: 2
- Fastest laps: 0
- Best finish: 4th in 1996

Previous series
- 1991-1993 1990: Atlantic Championship; USAC FF2000 Championship
- Father: Rick Galles

Jamie Galles (born 3 February 1972) is a former Atlantic Championship and Trans-Am Series driver. He is also the son of Rick Galles, former team owner of Galles Racing.

== Career history ==
=== Open wheel racing ===
Galles raced in the first ever season of the USF2000 in 1990. His best result was a third place at Willow Springs Raceway. He also raced in the Sports Car Club of America Formula Continental class. At the SCCA National Championship Runoffs, Galles placed eighteenth.

For 1991, Galles stepped up to the Atlantic Championship. For his second race, at Phoenix International Raceway, Galles score the pole position. He finished his Swift DB-4 in third place. At the 1991 Molson Indy Vancouver, Galles improved his best finish to a second place. He finished his debut season ninth in the standings. Galles returned for the 1992 Atlantic Championship season. During the season Galles score one podium finish. In the streets of Long Beach, he finished in second place. Galles placed seventh in the championship standings. He returned for a third and final season in the series in 1993. In the new Ralt RT-40 chassis, Galles scored two finishes, at Circuit Gilles Villeneuve and the Molson Indy Vancouver. In the final season, Galles placed tenth in the standings.

=== Trans-Am ===
For the 1994 season, Galles switched to the Trans-Am Series. Galles joined the series in the second round at Mosport Park. After starting twelfth, Galles finished his Chevrolet Camaro in third place. This turned out to be the only podium finish of the season for Galles. Galles place eleventh in the championship standings. He scored three more podium finishes in the 1995 SCCA Trans-Am season. He was placed fifth in the standings, again in the Camaro. 1996 was Galles's third and final season in the Trans-Am Series. He score his first win in the streets of Long Beach. A further three podium finishes placed Galles fourth in the championship standings.

=== Off-road racing ===
For 2012 Galles returned to racing. The Californian joined Brethel Industries in the High Desert Racing Association. Galles won the "Rockin' on the River" race near Laughlin, Nevada in the 7200 class.

In 2013, Galles shared a drive with Jonatan Brenthel during the Baja 500 race. Despite technical difficulties at the start, the team placed second in the 7200 class. The team won the 7200 class championship in 2013. The following year, the team with Galles, Jonathan Brenthel and Jordan Brenthel finished third in the Trophy Truck Spec class at the prestigious Baja 1000. The following year, the team finished their heavily modifie Falken Tire Chevrolet Silverado in fifth place.

== Personal ==
After retiring from professional motorsports at the end of the 1996 season, Galles joined Galles Racing as a team manager. Son of team principal Rick Galles left the team at the end of the 1999 season. Subsequently Galles joined his father's Chevrolet dealership in Albuquerque, New Mexico.

== Complete motorsports results ==
=== SCCA National Championship Runoffs ===
| Year | Track | Car | Engine | Class | Finish | Start | Status |
|---|---|---|---|---|---|---|---|
| 1990 | Road Atlanta | Reynard SF | Ford | Formula Continental | 18 | 10 | Running |

=== American Open-Wheel racing results ===
(key) (Races in bold indicate pole position, races in italics indicate fastest race lap)

==== USAC FF2000 Championship results ====
| Year | Entrant | 1 | 2 | 3 | 4 | 5 | 6 | 7 | 8 | 9 | Pos | Points |
|---|---|---|---|---|---|---|---|---|---|---|---|---|
| 1990 | | WSR1; 3 | MMR | WSR2; 12 | CAJ; 10 | WSR3 | SON1; 9 | FIR | SON2; 4 | PIR | ??? | ??? |

==== Atlantic Championship ====
| Year | Team | 1 | 2 | 3 | 4 | 5 | 6 | 7 | 8 | 9 | 10 | 11 | 12 | 13 | 14 | 15 | Rank | Points |
|---|---|---|---|---|---|---|---|---|---|---|---|---|---|---|---|---|---|---|
| 1991 | | LBH; 11 | **PIR**; 3 | LRP; 14 | MTL; 6 | WGI; 17 | DES; 8 | TOR; 22 | TRR; 20 | VAN; 2 | MOH; 10 | NAZ; 13 | LS1; 5 | LS2; 16 | | | **9th** | **76** |
| 1992 | | MIA; 4 | **PIR**; 11 | LBH; 2 | LRP; 5 | MTL; DNS | WGI; 20 | TOR; 19 | TRR; 17 | VAN; 7 | MOH; 8 | MOS | NAZ; 9 | LS1; 9 | LS2; 28 | | **7th** | **76** |
| 1993 | Della Penna Motorsports | PIR | LBH; 17 | ROA; DNS | MIL; 9 | MTL; 3 | MOS; 7 | HAL | TOR; 5 | NHS | TRR | VAN; 2 | MOH; 8 | NAZ; DNS | LS1; 4 | LS2; 12 | **10th** | **81** |
