= 1991 USAC FF2000 Championship =

Car racing competition

1991 USAC FF2000 Championship season

Seasons
- ← 1990 1992 →

The 1991 USAC FF2000 Championship was the second season of the series. The series was sanctioned by the United States Auto Club and ran races in California and Arizona. Craig Taylor won the championship in a Swift DB-6.

== Race calendar and results ==
Round	Circuit	Location	Date	Pole position	Fastest lap	Winner
1	Heartland Park Topeka	(United States) Topeka, Kansas	May 5	(United States) Craig Taylor		(United States) Craig Taylor
2	Infineon Raceway	(United States) Sonoma, California	June 8	(United States) Greg Tracy		(United States) Greg Tracy
3	Mesa Marin Raceway	(United States) Bakersfield, California	July 6	(United States) Randy McDaniel		(United States) Randy McDaniel
4	Heartland Park Topeka	(United States) Topeka, Kansas	August 3	(United States) Craig Taylor		(United States) Craig Taylor
5	Laguna Seca	(United States) Monterey, California	August 25	(United States) Curtis Farley		(United States) Curtis Farley
6	Mesa Marin Raceway	(United States) Bakersfield, California	September 14	(United States) Randy McDaniel		(United States) Randy McDaniel
7	Willow Springs Raceway	(United States) Rosamond, California	October 27	(United States) Randy McDaniel		(United States) Randy McDaniel
8	Laguna Seca	(United States) Monterey, California	November 16	(United States) Craig Taylor		(United States) Craig Taylor
9	Laguna Seca	(United States) Monterey, California	November 17	(United States) Greg Tracy		(United States) Craig Taylor

== Final standings ==
Color	Result
Gold	Winner
Silver	2nd place
Bronze	3rd place
Green	4th & 5th place
Light Blue	6th–10th place
Dark Blue	11th place or lower
Purple	Did not finish
Red	Did not qualify (DNQ)
Brown	Withdrawn (Wth)
Black	Disqualified (DSQ)
White	Did not start (DNS)
Blank	Did not participate (DNP)
Blank	Driver replacement (Rpl)
Blank	Injured (Inj)
Blank	No race held (NH)

Rank	Driver	(United States) TOP1	(United States) SON	(United States) MMR1	(United States) TOP2	(United States) LS1	(United States) MMR2	(United States) WSR	(United States) LS2	(United States) LS3	Points
1	(United States) Craig Taylor	1	3		1	21	7	2	1	1	126
2	(United States) Randy McDaniel		12	1		2	1	1	2	2	119
3	(United States) Greg Tracy	2	1	15	16	4	2	4	5	4	108
4	(United States) Curtis Farley	13	2	5	2	1	4	3	20	5	107
5	(United States) Tony Hunt		5	2	3	17	6		6	3	82
	(United States) Darrell Benner		9			12	13	9			
	(United States) Rege Brunner				13						
	(United States) Richard Brunt					19		10	16	17	
	(Argentina) Claudio Burtin		15			8		14			
	(United States) Tom Coleman	3	7	3		18					
	(United States) David Conyers				11		15	8	14	19	
	(United States) Sam Crystal								12	13	
	(United States) Michael DeVos								17	18	
	(United States) Lars Dirks	7	13	11	5	15					
	(United States) Keith Freber	4			5						
	(United States) Marcelo Gaffoglio		16			10		13	9	10	
	(United States) Gerry Gentry	5	17								
	(United States) Rick Giacomazzi		20	12	18	16					
	(United States) Mark Hamilton-Peters								19	15	
	(United States) Bob Henson	9									
	(United States) Michael Hughes		11	7		14					
	(United States) Phil Katzakian		18	10		7	9	7	13	12	
	(United States) Paul McKee		23	18	14		14				
	(United States) Lance Mears			9	10	6					
	(United States) Hugh O'Neill			17			5		21	7	
	(United States) Mike Palumbo								10	14	
	(United States) Andy Paterson	10	19				6				
	(United States) Dennis Patterson			13		22					
	(United States) Danny Ragland	15	22	4	7	3	11	5	8	8	
	(United States) Wayne Rodgers						8			6	
	(United States) Richard Schroebel								7	20	
	(United States) Dale Sexton, Jr.		8		19	13					
	(United States) Bill Stern	6	6	6	8	5	12	12	18	21	
	(United States) Rick Watkins	8			17						
	(United States) Taylor Weld	14			20						
	(United States) Brian Williams				4						
	(United States) Tom Yamamoto		10	16	15	11			11	16	
