= It's the Things You Do =

Single by Five

from the album Five
- B-side: "Don't You Want It?"; "Human" (the Five remix)
- Released: 27 October 1998
- Genre: Pop
- Length: 3:35
- Label: Arista
- Songwriters: Max Martin; George Shahin; Herbie Crichlow; Five
- Producers: Max Martin; Jake

Five singles chronology
"Everybody Get Up" (1998)	"It's the Things You Do" (1998)	"Until the Time Is Through" (1998)

"It's the Things You Do" is a song by British boy band Five, released as the fifth single from their debut studio album, Five (1998). It was written by Max Martin, George Shahin, Herbie Crichlow and Five. The song was released as a single exclusively in the United States. The song charted at number 53 on the Billboard Hot 100. Co-writer George Shahin originally released his version as a single in 1997 titled "The Things You Do", from his album All the Way. Five's version contains rewritten lyrics in the first verse, and a rap for the second verse, but keeps the pre-chorus and chorus.

== Song variations ==
Three official versions of the song exist:

- The original UK version is featured on the UK version of the album Five as well as on the group's Greatest Hits album. It features rap verses from Jason "J" Brown and Richard "Abs" Breen and a mellow beat.
- The US album version features on the US version of Five. This version was remixed by Cutfather & Joe and features an alternate rap from Brown, often labelled the "Coca-Cola Rap" in reference to the lyrics, and a totally different beat to the UK version.
- The US single version, released as a single, was used for the video. It features the beat of the US album version, but removes the rap verses and replaces them with a new verse sung by Scott Robinson.

== Music video ==
The video for the song, filmed at the Willow Springs Raceway in California, on 23 and 24 November 1998, was produced by David Robertson and directed by Nigel Dick, who had previously directed the video for the band's second single, "When the Lights Go Out". In the video, the band are seen entering a race car into the race being held at the race track that day. They then take it turns to drive the car, whilst the remaining members of the band watch from the sidelines. The video also depicts the band performing parts of the track inside the area designated as "the pits".

== Critical reception ==
Billboard praised "It's the Things You Do" as a solid pop single that keeps Five on track, noting that it "features what we've come to expect from pop maestros Max Martin and the late Denniz PoP". The reviewer also highlighted its appeal by calling it "a tasty slice of the unapologetic, youth-oriented pop fare that's been satisfying a voracious mainstream top 40 audience".

== Track listing ==
US promotional single

1. "It's the Things You Do" (Radio Edit without Rap) – 3:25
2. "It's the Things You Do" (Radio Edit with Rap) – 3:25
3. "It's the Things You Do" (Call Out Research Hook) – 0:10

US CD1

1. "It's the Things You Do" (US Single Remix) – 3:25
2. "Don't You Want It?" – 3:41

US CD2

1. "It's the Things You Do" (US Single Remix) – 3:25
2. "It's the Things You Do" (Sean & Dave's Extended Mix) – 4:37
3. "Don't You Want It?" – 3:41
4. "Human" (The Five Remix) – 3:55

US cassette single

1. "It's the Things You Do" – 3:25
2. "Don't You Want It?" – 3:41

UK cassette single

1. "I Want You Back" – 3.20
2. "It's the Things You Do" – 3.36

== Charts ==
Chart (1999)	Peak position
US Billboard Hot 100	53
