= 1989 24 Hours of Daytona =

28th 24 Hours of Daytona race

| Previous: 1988 | Next: 1990 |
Index: Races | Winners

Track map of Daytona International Speedway

The 27th Annual SunBank 24 at Daytona was a 24-hour endurance sports car race held on February 4–5, 1989 at the Daytona International Speedway road course. The race served as the opening round of the 1989 IMSA GT Championship.

Victory overall and in the GTP class went to the No. 67 Miller High Life/BF Goodrich 962 Porsche 962 driven by Bob Wollek, Derek Bell, and John Andretti. Victory in the Lights class went to the No. 9 Essex Racing Tiga GT288 driven by Charles Morgan, John Morrison, and Tom Hessert Jr. The GTO class was won by the No. 16 Stroh's Light Cougar Mercury Cougar XR-7 driven by Pete Halsmer, Bob Earl, Mark Martin, and Paul Stewart. Finally, the GTU class was won by the No. 17 Al Bacon Performance Mazda RX-7 driven by Al Bacon, Bob Reed, and Rod Millen.

== Race results ==
Class winners in bold.

| Pos | Class | No | Team | Drivers | Chassis | Tyre | Laps |
| Pos | Class | No | Team | Drivers | Engine | Tyre | Laps |
|---|---|---|---|---|---|---|---|
| 1 | **GTP** | **67** | (United States) **Miller High Life/BF Goodrich 962** | (France) **Bob Wollek** (United Kingdom) **Derek Bell** (United States) **John Andretti** | **Porsche 962** | **BF** | **621** |
| 1 | **GTP** | **67** | (United States) **Miller High Life/BF Goodrich 962** | (France) **Bob Wollek** (United Kingdom) **Derek Bell** (United States) **John Andretti** | Porsche 3.0L Flat 6 Turbo | **BF** | **621** |
| 2 | GTP | 61 | (United Kingdom) Castrol Jaguar Racing | (United States) Price Cobb (Denmark) John Nielsen (United Kingdom) Andy Wallace (Netherlands) Jan Lammers | Jaguar XJR-9 | **D** | 621 |
| 2 | GTP | 61 | (United Kingdom) Castrol Jaguar Racing | (United States) Price Cobb (Denmark) John Nielsen (United Kingdom) Andy Wallace (Netherlands) Jan Lammers | Jaguar 6.0L V12 N/A | **D** | 621 |
| 3 | GTP | 3 | (Switzerland) Brun Motorsports/Kalagian Racing | (Argentina) Oscar Larrauri (Switzerland) Walter Brun (Germany) Hans-Joachim Stuck | Porsche 962 | **Y** | 603 |
| 3 | GTP | 3 | (Switzerland) Brun Motorsports/Kalagian Racing | (Argentina) Oscar Larrauri (Switzerland) Walter Brun (Germany) Hans-Joachim Stuck | Porsche 3.0L Flat 6 Turbo | **Y** | 603 |
| 4 | GTP | 86 | (United States) Texaco Havoline Star Bayside Motorsports | (Germany) Klaus Ludwig (United Kingdom) James Weaver (South Africa) Sarel van der Merwe | Porsche 962 | **G** | 600 |
| 4 | GTP | 86 | (United States) Texaco Havoline Star Bayside Motorsports | (Germany) Klaus Ludwig (United Kingdom) James Weaver (South Africa) Sarel van der Merwe | Porsche 3.0L Flat 6 Turbo | **G** | 600 |
| 5 | GTP | 77 | (United States) Mazda Motors of America | (Japan) Yoshimi Katayama (Japan) Takashi Yorino (United States) Elliott Forbes-Robinson | Mazda 767B | **D** | 559 |
| 5 | GTP | 77 | (United States) Mazda Motors of America | (Japan) Yoshimi Katayama (Japan) Takashi Yorino (United States) Elliott Forbes-Robinson | Mazda 2.6L 4 Rotor | **D** | 559 |
| 6 | **GTO** | **16** | (United States) **Stroh's Light Cougar** | (United States) **Pete Halsmer** (United States) **Bob Earl** (United States) **Mark Martin** (United Kingdom) **Paul Stewart** | **Mercury Cougar XR-7** | **G** | **554** |
| 6 | **GTO** | **16** | (United States) **Stroh's Light Cougar** | (United States) **Pete Halsmer** (United States) **Bob Earl** (United States) **Mark Martin** (United Kingdom) **Paul Stewart** | Ford 6.0L V8 N/A | **G** | **554** |
| 7 | GTO | 11 | (United States) Stroh's Light Cougar | (United States) Wally Dallenbach Jr. (United States) Dorsey Schroeder (United States) Mark Martin | Mercury Cougar XR-7 | **G** | 534 |
| 7 | GTO | 11 | (United States) Stroh's Light Cougar | (United States) Wally Dallenbach Jr. (United States) Dorsey Schroeder (United States) Mark Martin | Ford 6.0L V8 N/A | **G** | 534 |
| 8 | **Lights** | **9** | (United States) **Essex Racing** | (United States) **Charles Morgan** (United Kingdom) **John Morrison** (United States) **Tom Hessert Jr.** | **Tiga GT288** | **G** | **530** |
| 8 | **Lights** | **9** | (United States) **Essex Racing** | (United States) **Charles Morgan** (United Kingdom) **John Morrison** (United States) **Tom Hessert Jr.** | Buick 3.0L V6 N/A | **G** | **530** |
| 9 | GTO | 92 | (United States) Motorcraft | (United States) Bob Zeeb (United States) Jeff Purner (United States) Bobby Akin | Mercury Capri | **G** | 530 |
| 9 | GTO | 92 | (United States) Motorcraft | (United States) Bob Zeeb (United States) Jeff Purner (United States) Bobby Akin | Ford 6.0L V8 N/A | **G** | 530 |
| 10 | GTO | 90 | (United States) Road Circuit Technology | (United States) Andy Petery (United States) Les Delano (United States) Craig Carter | Mercury Capri | **G** | 528 |
| 10 | GTO | 90 | (United States) Road Circuit Technology | (United States) Andy Petery (United States) Les Delano (United States) Craig Carter | Ford 6.0L V8 N/A | **G** | 528 |
| 11 | GTO | 38 | (United States) Mandeville Auto/Tech | (United States) Roger Mandeville (United States) Kelly Marsh (United Kingdom) Brian Redman | Mazda RX-7 | **Y** | 528 |
| 11 | GTO | 38 | (United States) Mandeville Auto/Tech | (United States) Roger Mandeville (United States) Kelly Marsh (United Kingdom) Brian Redman | Mazda 1.9L 3 Rotor | **Y** | 528 |
| 12 | **GTU** | **17** | (United States) **Al Bacon Performance** | (United States) **Al Bacon** (United States) **Bob Reed** (New Zealand) **Rod Millen** | **Mazda RX-7** | **F** | **526** |
| 12 | **GTU** | **17** | (United States) **Al Bacon Performance** | (United States) **Al Bacon** (United States) **Bob Reed** (New Zealand) **Rod Millen** | Mazda 1.3L Rotary | **F** | **526** |
| 13 DNF | GTU | 95 | (United States) Fastcolor Images | (United States) Bob Leitzinger (United States) Chuck Kurtz (United States) Butch Leitzinger | Nissan 240SX | **T** | 517 |
| 13 DNF | GTU | 95 | (United States) Fastcolor Images | (United States) Bob Leitzinger (United States) Chuck Kurtz (United States) Butch Leitzinger | Nissan 3.0L V6 N/A | **T** | 517 |
| 14 | GTU | 71 | (United States) Team Highball | (United States) Amos Johnson (United States) Dennis Shaw (United States) Bob Lazier | Mazda RX-7 | **Y** | 516 |
| 14 | GTU | 71 | (United States) Team Highball | (United States) Amos Johnson (United States) Dennis Shaw (United States) Bob Lazier | Mazda 1.3L Rotary | **Y** | 516 |
| 15 | GTP | 8 | (United States) Fabcar American Racing | (United States) Tim McAdam (Canada) Bill Adam (United States) Chip Mead | Fabcar GTP | **G** | 515 |
| 15 | GTP | 8 | (United States) Fabcar American Racing | (United States) Tim McAdam (Canada) Bill Adam (United States) Chip Mead | Chevrolet 6.0L V8 N/A | **G** | 515 |
| 16 | GTU | 89 | (United States) 901 Racing | (United States) Jack Refenning (United States) Rusty Scott (United States) Freddy Baker (United States) Peter Uria | Porsche 911 Carrera RSR | **F** | 511 |
| 16 | GTU | 89 | (United States) 901 Racing | (United States) Jack Refenning (United States) Rusty Scott (United States) Freddy Baker (United States) Peter Uria | Porsche 3.2L Flat 6 N/A | **F** | 511 |
| 17 | GTO | 03 | (United States) Skoal Bandit Racing | (United States) Tommy Kendall (United States) Max Jones (United States) Buz McCall (United States) Jack Baldwin | Chevrolet Camaro | **G** | 498 |
| 17 | GTO | 03 | (United States) Skoal Bandit Racing | (United States) Tommy Kendall (United States) Max Jones (United States) Buz McCall (United States) Jack Baldwin | Chevrolet 5.5L V8 N/A | **G** | 498 |
| 18 DNF | GTP | 64 | (Mexico) Bernard Jourdain | (Mexico) Bernard Jourdain (Mexico) Oscar Manautou (Canada) Allen Berg (Mexico) Andres Contreras | Porsche 962 | **G** | 485 |
| 18 DNF | GTP | 64 | (Mexico) Bernard Jourdain | (Mexico) Bernard Jourdain (Mexico) Oscar Manautou (Canada) Allen Berg (Mexico) Andres Contreras | Porsche 3.0L Flat 6 Turbo | **G** | 485 |
| 19 | GTU | 62 | (United States) Alex Job Racing | (United States) Terry Wolters (United States) Chris Kraft (United States) Rusty Bond (United States) Alex Job | Porsche 911 | **G** | 485 |
| 19 | GTU | 62 | (United States) Alex Job Racing | (United States) Terry Wolters (United States) Chris Kraft (United States) Rusty Bond (United States) Alex Job | Porsche 3.0L Flat 6 N/A | **G** | 485 |
| 20 DNF | GTP | 10 | (United States) Hotchkis Racing | (United States) Jim Adams (United States) John Hotchkis (United States) John Hotchkis Jr. | Porsche 962 | **G** | 483 |
| 20 DNF | GTP | 10 | (United States) Hotchkis Racing | (United States) Jim Adams (United States) John Hotchkis (United States) John Hotchkis Jr. | Porsche 3.0L Flat 6 Turbo | **G** | 483 |
| 21 | GTU | 82 | (United States) Aspen Inn | (United States) Dick Greer (United States) Mike Mees (United States) John Finger | Mazda RX-7 | **Y** | 478 |
| 21 | GTU | 82 | (United States) Aspen Inn | (United States) Dick Greer (United States) Mike Mees (United States) John Finger | Mazda 1.3L Rotary | **Y** | 478 |
| 22 | Lights | 40 | (Canada) Bieri Racing | (Italy) Martino Finotto (Italy) Paolo Guatamacchi (Canada) Uli Bieri | Tiga GT286 | **G** | 475 |
| 22 | Lights | 40 | (Canada) Bieri Racing | (Italy) Martino Finotto (Italy) Paolo Guatamacchi (Canada) Uli Bieri | Ferrari 3.0L V8 N/A | **G** | 475 |
| 23 | Lights | 55 | (United States) Huffaker Racing | (United States) Dan Marvin (United States) Alan Freed (United States) Mike Allison (United States) Scott Liebler | Spice SE86CL | **F** | 471 |
| 23 | Lights | 55 | (United States) Huffaker Racing | (United States) Dan Marvin (United States) Alan Freed (United States) Mike Allison (United States) Scott Liebler | Pontiac 3.0L I4 N/A | **F** | 471 |
| 24 | GTP | 5 | (United States) Tom Milner Racing | (Switzerland) Jean-Pierre Frey (Canada) Marty Roth (United States) Albert Naon Jr. | Ford Mustang Probe | **G** | 465 |
| 24 | GTP | 5 | (United States) Tom Milner Racing | (Switzerland) Jean-Pierre Frey (Canada) Marty Roth (United States) Albert Naon Jr. | Ford 6.0L V8 N/A | **G** | 465 |
| 25 | Lights | 26 | (United States) MSB Racing | (United States) Dave Cowart (United States) Scott Brayton (United States) Mike Meyer (United States) Jim Fowells | Argo JM19 | **G** | 460 |
| 25 | Lights | 26 | (United States) MSB Racing | (United States) Dave Cowart (United States) Scott Brayton (United States) Mike Meyer (United States) Jim Fowells | Mazda 1.3L 2 Rotor | **G** | 460 |
| 26 DNF | Lights | 4 | (United States) Buick/Quaker State | (United States) Linda Ludemann (United States) Scott Schubot (United Kingdom) John Williams | Spice SE88P | **G** | 456 |
| 26 DNF | Lights | 4 | (United States) Buick/Quaker State | (United States) Linda Ludemann (United States) Scott Schubot (United Kingdom) John Williams | Buick 3.0L V6 N/A | **G** | 456 |
| 27 DNF | GTP | 83 | (United States) Electramotive Engineering | (Netherlands) Arie Luyendyk (United States) Chip Robinson (Australia) Geoff Brabham (Republic of Ireland) Michael Roe | Nissan GTP ZX-Turbo | **G** | 453 |
| 27 DNF | GTP | 83 | (United States) Electramotive Engineering | (Netherlands) Arie Luyendyk (United States) Chip Robinson (Australia) Geoff Brabham (Republic of Ireland) Michael Roe | Nissan 3.0L V6 Turbo | **G** | 453 |
| 28 DNF | GTP | 33 | (United States) Old Spice Pontiac | (Austria) Dieter Quester (Greece) Costas Los (United States) Jeff Kline | Spice SE88P | **G** | 427 |
| 28 DNF | GTP | 33 | (United States) Old Spice Pontiac | (Austria) Dieter Quester (Greece) Costas Los (United States) Jeff Kline | Pontiac 5.0L V8 N/A | **G** | 427 |
| 29 DNF | GTP | 09 | (United States) Ball Bros. Racing | (United States) Steve Durst (United States) Jay Cochran (United States) Mike Brockman (United States) Tony Belcher | Spice SE88P | **G** | 426 |
| 29 DNF | GTP | 09 | (United States) Ball Bros. Racing | (United States) Steve Durst (United States) Jay Cochran (United States) Mike Brockman (United States) Tony Belcher | Buick 4.5L V6 N/A | **G** | 426 |
| 30 DNF | Lights | 63 | (United States) Mazda Motors of America | (United States) Howard Katz (United States) Jim Downing (United States) John O'Steen (United States) John Maffucci | Argo JM19 | **G** | 412 |
| 30 DNF | Lights | 63 | (United States) Mazda Motors of America | (United States) Howard Katz (United States) Jim Downing (United States) John O'Steen (United States) John Maffucci | Mazda 1.3L 2 Rotor | **G** | 412 |
| 31 DNF | Lights | 43 | (United States) Motorsports Marketing | (United States) John Higgins (United States) Lorenzo Lamas (United States) Buddy Lazier (United States) Justus Reid | Fabcar CL | **G** | 395 |
| 31 DNF | Lights | 43 | (United States) Motorsports Marketing | (United States) John Higgins (United States) Lorenzo Lamas (United States) Buddy Lazier (United States) Justus Reid | Porsche 3.0L Flat 6 N/A | **G** | 395 |
| 32 | Lights | 75 | (United States) Jack Engelhardt | (United States) Max Schmidt (United States) Todd Brayton (United States) Rusty Schmidt (United States) Jack Engelhardt | Badger BB | **G** | 391 |
| 32 | Lights | 75 | (United States) Jack Engelhardt | (United States) Max Schmidt (United States) Todd Brayton (United States) Rusty Schmidt (United States) Jack Engelhardt | Mazda 1.3L 2 Rotor | **G** | 391 |
| 33 DNF | GTO | 35 | (United States) Budweiser Racing | (United States) Craig Rubright (Belgium) Jean-Paul Libert (United States) Kermit Upton | Chevrolet Camaro | **G** | 360 |
| 33 DNF | GTO | 35 | (United States) Budweiser Racing | (United States) Craig Rubright (Belgium) Jean-Paul Libert (United States) Kermit Upton | Chevrolet 5.5L V8 N/A | **G** | 360 |
| 34 DNF | GTU | 04 | (United States) SP Racing | (United States) Gary Auberlen (United States) Bill Auberlen (United States) Cary Eisenlohr (United States) Monte Shelton | Porsche 911 Carrera | **G** | 351 |
| 34 DNF | GTU | 04 | (United States) SP Racing | (United States) Gary Auberlen (United States) Bill Auberlen (United States) Cary Eisenlohr (United States) Monte Shelton | Porsche 3.0L Flat 6 N/A | **G** | 351 |
| 35 DNF | Lights | 05 | (Puerto Rico) Diman Racing | (Puerto Rico) Tato Ferrer (Puerto Rico) Rolando Falgueras (Puerto Rico) Manuel Villa (Puerto Rico) Mandy Gonzalez | Royale RP40 | **G** | 349 |
| 35 DNF | Lights | 05 | (Puerto Rico) Diman Racing | (Puerto Rico) Tato Ferrer (Puerto Rico) Rolando Falgueras (Puerto Rico) Manuel Villa (Puerto Rico) Mandy Gonzalez | Porsche 3.0L Flat 6 N/A | **G** | 349 |
| 36 DNF | GTP | 85 | (United States) Texaco Havoline Star Bayside Motorsports | (United States) Bruce Leven (United States) Rob Dyson (United States) Dominic Dobson (United States) John Paul Jr. | Porsche 962 | **G** | 347 |
| 36 DNF | GTP | 85 | (United States) Texaco Havoline Star Bayside Motorsports | (United States) Bruce Leven (United States) Rob Dyson (United States) Dominic Dobson (United States) John Paul Jr. | Porsche 3.0L Flat 6 Turbo | **G** | 347 |
| 37 DNF | GTP | 0 | (Germany) Joest Racing | (Germany) Frank Jelinski (France) Claude Ballot-Léna (France) Jean-Louis Ricci | Porsche 962 | **G** | 346 |
| 37 DNF | GTP | 0 | (Germany) Joest Racing | (Germany) Frank Jelinski (France) Claude Ballot-Léna (France) Jean-Louis Ricci | Porsche 3.0L Flat 6 Turbo | **G** | 346 |
| 38 DNF | GTU | 87 | (United States) Overton Autosport | (United States) Lance Stewart (United States) Ron Cortez (United States) Jeff Alkazian (United States) Chet Fillip | Mazda RX-7 | **F** | 344 |
| 38 DNF | GTU | 87 | (United States) Overton Autosport | (United States) Lance Stewart (United States) Ron Cortez (United States) Jeff Alkazian (United States) Chet Fillip | Mazda 1.3L Rotary | **F** | 344 |
| 39 | GTO | 51 | (United States) Caribbean Sol | (Canada) Jack Boxstrom (United States) Dale Kreider (United States) Mark Porcaro (United States) Carson Hurley | Buick Somerset | **G** | 341 |
| 39 | GTO | 51 | (United States) Caribbean Sol | (Canada) Jack Boxstrom (United States) Dale Kreider (United States) Mark Porcaro (United States) Carson Hurley | Buick 6.0L V8 N/A | **G** | 341 |
| 40 | GTO | 32 | (Canada) Oftedahl Racing | (Canada) Ric Moore (Canada) Pieter Baljet (Canada) Randy McDonald | Buick Somerset | **F** | 335 |
| 40 | GTO | 32 | (Canada) Oftedahl Racing | (Canada) Ric Moore (Canada) Pieter Baljet (Canada) Randy McDonald | Buick 5.7L V8 N/A | **F** | 335 |
| 41 DNF | GTU | 74 | (United States) Huffaker Racing | (United States) George Robinson (United States) Bart Kendall (United States) Johnny Unser | Pontiac Fiero | **F** | 323 |
| 41 DNF | GTU | 74 | (United States) Huffaker Racing | (United States) George Robinson (United States) Bart Kendall (United States) Johnny Unser | Pontiac 3.0L I4 N/A | **F** | 323 |
| 42 DNF | Lights | 91 | (United States) G.T. Motorsport | (United States) David LaCroix (Canada) David Seabroke (United States) Buzzy Smith (United States) Tommy Johnson | Tiga GT285 | **G** | 310 |
| 42 DNF | Lights | 91 | (United States) G.T. Motorsport | (United States) David LaCroix (Canada) David Seabroke (United States) Buzzy Smith (United States) Tommy Johnson | Mazda 1.3L 2 Rotor | **G** | 310 |
| 43 DNF | GTP | 60 | (United Kingdom) Castrol Jaguar Racing | (Netherlands) Jan Lammers (United States) Davy Jones (Brazil) Raul Boesel | Jaguar XJR-9 | **D** | 288 |
| 43 DNF | GTP | 60 | (United Kingdom) Castrol Jaguar Racing | (Netherlands) Jan Lammers (United States) Davy Jones (Brazil) Raul Boesel | Jaguar 6.0L V12 N/A | **D** | 288 |
| 44 DNF | GTO | 53 | (United States) Chateau Souverain | (United States) Richard McDill (United States) Robert Whitaker (United States) Bill McDill | Chevrolet Camaro | **G** | 287 |
| 44 DNF | GTO | 53 | (United States) Chateau Souverain | (United States) Richard McDill (United States) Robert Whitaker (United States) Bill McDill | Chevrolet 6.0L V8 N/A | **G** | 287 |
| 45 | GTO | 94 | (United States) Spirit of Brandon | (United States) Steve Burgner (United States) Ken Bupp (United States) Henry Brosnaham (Canada) Robert Peters (United States) Mark Montgomery | Chevrolet Camaro | **G** | 269 |
| 45 | GTO | 94 | (United States) Spirit of Brandon | (United States) Steve Burgner (United States) Ken Bupp (United States) Henry Brosnaham (Canada) Robert Peters (United States) Mark Montgomery | Chevrolet 6.0L V8 N/A | **G** | 269 |
| 46 DNF | Lights | 28 | (United States) Far Western Bank Canada Shoes | (United States) Tony Adamowicz (United States) Albert Rocca (Mexico) Tomas Lopez (Mexico) Aurelio Lopez | Tiga GT286 | **G** | 266 |
| 46 DNF | Lights | 28 | (United States) Far Western Bank Canada Shoes | (United States) Tony Adamowicz (United States) Albert Rocca (Mexico) Tomas Lopez (Mexico) Aurelio Lopez | Mazda 1.3L 2 Rotor | **G** | 266 |
| 47 DNF | GTP | 68 | (United States) Busby Racing | (United States) Mario Andretti (United States) Michael Andretti | Porsche 962 | **BF** | 237 |
| 47 DNF | GTP | 68 | (United States) Busby Racing | (United States) Mario Andretti (United States) Michael Andretti | Porsche 3.0L Flat 6 Turbo | **BF** | 237 |
| 48 DNF | Lights | 02 | (United States) Taymay, Inc. | (United States) Parker Johnstone (United States) Frank Everett (United States) Ron Nelson | Spice SE86CL | **G** | 229 |
| 48 DNF | Lights | 02 | (United States) Taymay, Inc. | (United States) Parker Johnstone (United States) Frank Everett (United States) Ron Nelson | Pontiac 3.0L I4 N/A | **G** | 229 |
| 49 DNF | GTO | 31 | (United States) A&R Auto Electric | (United States) Wayne Akers (United States) Kent Painter (United States) Anthony Puleo (United States) David Donner | Chevrolet Camaro | **G** | 217 |
| 49 DNF | GTO | 31 | (United States) A&R Auto Electric | (United States) Wayne Akers (United States) Kent Painter (United States) Anthony Puleo (United States) David Donner | Chevrolet 5.7L V8 N/A | **G** | 217 |
| 50 DNF | GTP | 98 | (United States) All American Racers | (United States) Drake Olson (United States) Chris Cord (United States) Steve Bren | Toyota 88C | **G** | 180 |
| 50 DNF | GTP | 98 | (United States) All American Racers | (United States) Drake Olson (United States) Chris Cord (United States) Steve Bren | Toyota 2.1L I4 Turbo | **G** | 180 |
| 51 DNF | Lights | 88 | (United States) Transact, Inc. | (United States) Tom Phillips (United States) Steve Johnson (United States) Bob Lesnett | Argo JM19 | **G** | 165 |
| 51 DNF | Lights | 88 | (United States) Transact, Inc. | (United States) Tom Phillips (United States) Steve Johnson (United States) Bob Lesnett | Ferrari 3.0L V8 N/A | **G** | 165 |
| 52 DNF | GTO | 46 | (United States) Gultwind Marine | (United States) Daniel Urrutia (United States) Gene Whipp (United States) Gary Smith (United States) Jack Swanson | Chevrolet Camaro | **G** | 160 |
| 52 DNF | GTO | 46 | (United States) Gultwind Marine | (United States) Daniel Urrutia (United States) Gene Whipp (United States) Gary Smith (United States) Jack Swanson | Chevrolet 5.7L V8 N/A | **G** | 160 |
| 53 DNF | GTU | 07 | (United States) Full Time Racing | (United States) Tommy Riggins (United States) Joe Varde (United States) Kal Showket | Dodge Daytona | **Y** | 156 |
| 53 DNF | GTU | 07 | (United States) Full Time Racing | (United States) Tommy Riggins (United States) Joe Varde (United States) Kal Showket | Dodge 2.4L I4 N/A | **Y** | 156 |
| 54 DNF | GTU | 57 | (United States) Kryder Racing | (United States) Reed Kryder (United States) Zoltan Polony (United States) Brian Goodwin (United States) Craig Shafer | Nissan 300ZX | **G** | 142 |
| 54 DNF | GTU | 57 | (United States) Kryder Racing | (United States) Reed Kryder (United States) Zoltan Polony (United States) Brian Goodwin (United States) Craig Shafer | Nissan 3.0L V6 N/A | **G** | 142 |
| 55 DNF | GTP | 6 | (United States) Tom Milner Racing | (United States) Tom Pumpelly (Italy) Ruggero Melgrati (United States) Jack Baldwin | Ford Mustang Probe | **G** | 117 |
| 55 DNF | GTP | 6 | (United States) Tom Milner Racing | (United States) Tom Pumpelly (Italy) Ruggero Melgrati (United States) Jack Baldwin | Ford 2.1L I4 Turbo | **G** | 117 |
| 56 DNF | Lights | 36 | (United States) Erie Scientific | (United States) John Grooms (United States) John Fergus (United States) Frank Jellinek (Canada) Charles Monk | Argo JM16 | **G** | 111 |
| 56 DNF | Lights | 36 | (United States) Erie Scientific | (United States) John Grooms (United States) John Fergus (United States) Frank Jellinek (Canada) Charles Monk | Mazda 1.3L 2 Rotor | **G** | 111 |
| 57 DNF | GTO | 47 | (United States) Chaunce Wallace | (United States) Jim Burt (United States) Nort Northam (United States) Chaunce Wallace | Chevrolet Camaro | **G** | 111 |
| 57 DNF | GTO | 47 | (United States) Chaunce Wallace | (United States) Jim Burt (United States) Nort Northam (United States) Chaunce Wallace | Chevrolet 5.1L V8 N/A | **G** | 111 |
| 58 DNF | GTO | 27 | (United States) Rocketsports Racing | (United States) Scott Pruett (United States) Jerry Clinton (United States) Les Lindley (United States) Paul Gentilozzi | Oldsmobile Cutlass | **G** | 101 |
| 58 DNF | GTO | 27 | (United States) Rocketsports Racing | (United States) Scott Pruett (United States) Jerry Clinton (United States) Les Lindley (United States) Paul Gentilozzi | Chevrolet 6.0L V8 N/A | **G** | 101 |
| 59 DNF | Lights | 20 | (United States) Kennedy Groves | (United States) Fred Phillips (United States) Ron McKay (United States) Randy Pobst | Tiga GT285 | **H** | 92 |
| 59 DNF | Lights | 20 | (United States) Kennedy Groves | (United States) Fred Phillips (United States) Ron McKay (United States) Randy Pobst | Mazda 1.3L 2 Rotor | **H** | 92 |
| 60 DNF | GTP | 30 | (Germany) Torno-Momo | (Italy) Massimo Sigala (Italy) Mauro Baldi (Italy) Giampiero Moretti (Sweden) Stanley Dickens | Porsche 962 | **G** | 80 |
| 60 DNF | GTP | 30 | (Germany) Torno-Momo | (Italy) Massimo Sigala (Italy) Mauro Baldi (Italy) Giampiero Moretti (Sweden) Stanley Dickens | Porsche 3.0L Flat 6 Turbo | **G** | 80 |
| 61 DNF | GTP | 84 | (United States) Electramotive Engineering | (Republic of Ireland) Michael Roe (Australia) Geoff Brabham (United States) Chip Robinson (Netherlands) Arie Luyendyk | Nissan GTP ZX-Turbo | **G** | 51 |
| 61 DNF | GTP | 84 | (United States) Electramotive Engineering | (Republic of Ireland) Michael Roe (Australia) Geoff Brabham (United States) Chip Robinson (Netherlands) Arie Luyendyk | Nissan 3.0L V6 Turbo | **G** | 51 |
| 62 DNF | GTO | 12 | (United States) Del Russo Taylor | (United States) Ken Bupp (Canada) Robert Peters (United States) Del Russo Taylor (United States) Mark Montgomery (United States) Paul Goral | Pontiac Firebird | **G** | 50 |
| 62 DNF | GTO | 12 | (United States) Del Russo Taylor | (United States) Ken Bupp (Canada) Robert Peters (United States) Del Russo Taylor (United States) Mark Montgomery (United States) Paul Goral | Pontiac 6.0L V8 N/A | **G** | 50 |
| 63 DNF | GTO | 29 | (United States) Overbagh Motor Racing | (United States) Oma Kimbrough (United States) Robert Kahn (United States) Hoyt Overbagh (United States) Robert Siegal (Canada) Robert Peters | Chevrolet Camaro | **G** | 31 |
| 63 DNF | GTO | 29 | (United States) Overbagh Motor Racing | (United States) Oma Kimbrough (United States) Robert Kahn (United States) Hoyt Overbagh (United States) Robert Siegal (Canada) Robert Peters | Chevrolet 6.0L V8 N/A | **G** | 31 |
| 64 DNF | Lights | 58 | (United States) Gary Wonzer Racing | (United States) Bill Bean (United States) Michael Dow (United States) Gary Wonzer | Lola T616 | **H** | 19 |
| 64 DNF | Lights | 58 | (United States) Gary Wonzer Racing | (United States) Bill Bean (United States) Michael Dow (United States) Gary Wonzer | Mazda 1.3L 2 Rotor | **H** | 19 |
| 65 DNF | GTO | 96 | (United States) Paul Reisman | (United States) Paul Reisman (United States) Bob Hebert (United States) Tom Gaffney (Canada) Doug Mills | Chevrolet Camaro | **F** | 4 |
| 65 DNF | GTO | 96 | (United States) Paul Reisman | (United States) Paul Reisman (United States) Bob Hebert (United States) Tom Gaffney (Canada) Doug Mills | Chevrolet 5.8L V8 N/A | **F** | 4 |
| 66 DNF | GTU | 72 | (United States) Jay Kjoller | (United States) Jay Kjoller (United States) Patrick Mooney (United States) Robin Boone (United States) Bob Dotson | Porsche 911 | **F** | 2 |
| 66 DNF | GTU | 72 | (United States) Jay Kjoller | (United States) Jay Kjoller (United States) Patrick Mooney (United States) Robin Boone (United States) Bob Dotson | Porsche 3.2L Flat 6 N/A | **F** | 2 |
| 67 DNF | GTP | 66 | (United Kingdom) Castrol Jaguar Racing | (Republic of Ireland) Derek Daly (United Kingdom) Martin Donnelly (France) Patrick Tambay | Jaguar XJR-9 | **D** | 1 |
| 67 DNF | GTP | 66 | (United Kingdom) Castrol Jaguar Racing | (Republic of Ireland) Derek Daly (United Kingdom) Martin Donnelly (France) Patrick Tambay | Jaguar 6.0L V12 N/A | **D** | 1 |
| DNS | GTP | 7 | (United States) Tom Milner Racing | (United States) Lyn St. James (United States) David Loring (Canada) Marty Roth | Ford Mustang Probe | ? | - |
| DNS | GTP | 7 | (United States) Tom Milner Racing | (United States) Lyn St. James (United States) David Loring (Canada) Marty Roth | ? | ? | - |
| DNS | Lights | 79 | (United States) Whitehall Motorsports | (United States) Jim Rothbarth (United States) Mike Ciasulli (United States) Kenper Miller (United States) Gene Felton | Spice SE87L | **G** | - |
| DNS | Lights | 79 | (United States) Whitehall Motorsports | (United States) Jim Rothbarth (United States) Mike Ciasulli (United States) Kenper Miller (United States) Gene Felton | Pontiac 2.7L I4 N/A | **G** | - |
