= Bob Lesnett =

Aermican automobile racing driver

- Nationality: (United States) American
- Born: September 27, 1953 (age 73)

Robert Gage Lesnett (born 27 September 1953) is a former Sportscar and Formula racing driver, team owner and race engineer. With 14 championships, over 60 career wins, Lesnett's career spanned the most competitive amateur open wheel series (Formula Ford, Sports 2000 and F2000) and includes numerous professional accomplishments including winning the 24 Hours of Daytona and a driver and engineer, winning the Sebring 12 hours and SCCA National, Divisional and Regional Championships.

== Racing career ==
Bob Lesnett started racing just out of college in formula V, and quickly progressed into regional Formula Ford Racing. In 1980, he founded Pfeiffer Ridge Racing, a full service support shop for Formula Ford, Atlantic, F2000 and Sports 2000 competitors. As a driver his break-through championship came in 1982, in the hard-fought San Francisco Region Formula Ford class. Numerous Regional and West Coast championships followed, culminating with his first National Championship in the S2000 class, in 1988.

The West Coast–based driver first appeared at the national level in 1986. Racing at the SCCA National Championship Runoffs Lesnett competed in the Sports 2000 class. Lesnett finished his debut Runoffs race in sixth place competing in a Lola T86/90. Lesnett returned in 1988 winning a National Championship in the S2000 class with a Swift DB2. With Pfeiffer Ridge Racing, Lesnett made his IMSA GT Championship debut in the Camel Lights class. Tom Blackaller and Lesnett finished tenth overall at the final edition of the Los Angeles Times Grand Prix. In 1988, Lesnett also won the American City Racing League, an S2000 based series. Over the years of his professional career, Lesnett partnered outstanding drivers like Dan Marvin, Parker Johnstone, Steve Cameron, Doug Peterson.

Also in 1988, Lesnett received the Motorsports Press Association Closed Wheel Driver of the Year Award. Also in 1988 he was recipient of the SCCA's Kimberly Cup, for the Outstanding Driver of the Year.

Through the years, Lesnett made a number of IMSA GT appearances. He made his debut in the 24 Hours of Daytona in 1989. Racing a Ferrari powered Argo JM19B Lesnett was joined by Tom Phillips and Steve Johnson. The team failed to finish after 165 laps. Lesnett returned in 1991 finishing seventh overall in a factory entered Acura powered Spice SE90P. The team finished seventh overall, first in the Lights class. Lesnett also made a one-off appearance in the 1991 IMSA Supercar Championship racing a Consulier GTP.

Lesnett also competed in the inaugural USF2000 championship and was successful with two victories, at Mesa Marin Raceway and Cajon Speedway. Lesnett was the runner up in the USAC sanctioned championship, behind Vince Puleo, Jr.

For 1991, Lesnett raced a partial Atlantic Championship campaign. At the Des Moines Street Circuit Lesnett scored his best result, finishing seventh.

In 1993, Lesnett Founded Summit Motorsports, focused on supporting and engineering professional level competitors in Indy Lights (Doug Boyer driving). His engineering success culminated in 2003, as he engineered Kevin Buckler, Michael Schrom, Timo Bernhard and Jörg Bergmeister to an extraordinary overall win as all of the prototype competitors failed to finish.

== Business, Karting and Vintage racing career ==
In 2004, Lesnett retired from active competition to found Lesnett Real Estate, a business he operates to the present. In 2007, and 2012, he entered and won the RedLine Karting Championship, where he won the 80cc Shifter Championship. In 2018, he made a return to Formula Ford Racing by entering the Crossflow Cup, Historic Formula Series in his restored Titan Mk 6, with which he has posted several podiums and CSRG club wins. In 2019, Lesnett competed in the Formula Ford group at the Rolex Motorsports Reunion at Laguna Seca. Out of 56 cars and drivers (which included pros Mikel Miller, Ethan Shippert, Danny Baker), Lesnett achieved a pole and win in the pre-reunion and P4 in qualifying for the Sunday Feature (he has a DNS due to a car fire on Sunday). In 2020, he finished second in the Crossflow Cup Historic Championship and was also the Masters Champion.

== Motorsport results ==
=== SCCA and professional racing results and awards ===
Year	Track/Region	Car	Class	Finish
1982	San Francisco Region SCCA	Crossle 32	Formula Ford	Champion
1983	Pacific Coast SCCA Runoffs	Crossle 32	Formula Ford	Champion
1983	San Francisco Region SCCA	Crossle 32	Formula Ford	Champion
1984	San Francisco Region SCCA	Van Diemen	Formula Ford	Champion
1986	Pacific Coast SCCA Runoffs	Lola	S2000	Champion
1986	Northern Pacific SCCA Runoffs	Lola	S2000	Champion
1987	Pacific Coast SCCA Runoffs	Swift DB2	S2000	Champion
1988	Pacific Coast Runoffs	Swift DB2	S2000	Champion
1988	SCCA National Championships	Swift DB2	S2000	Champion
1988	ACRL Pro Sports 2000 Series	Swift DB2	S2000	Champion
1989	ACRL Pro Sports 2000 Series	Swift DB2	S2000	Champion
1989	IMSA Sebring 12 Hours	Spice Pontiac	Camel Lights	Winner
1990	USAC F2000 Team Championship	Swift DB6	F2000	Champion
1991	Illgen Classic 4 Hour at Sonoma	Swift DB2	S2000	Winner
1991	IMSA Daytona 24 Hour	Spice Acura	Camel Lights	Winner
