= Willow Springs International Motorsports Park =

Former NASCAR track

Willow Springs
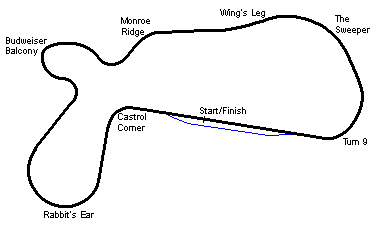
- Big Willow (1953–present)
- Location: Kern County, near Rosamond, California, United States
- Coordinates: 34°52′30″N 118°15′52″W
- Broke ground: 1952
- Opened: 23 November 1953; 72 years ago
- Former names: Willow Springs Raceway (1953–1982)
- Major events: Former: Trans-Am West Coast Series (2017); AMA Superbike Championship (1983–1985, 1990, 1998–2000); Ferrari Challenge North America (1994, 1999); Atlantic Championship Series (1983–1985, 1989); Can-Am (1987); NASCAR Winston West Series (1955–1956, 1984–1986); NASCAR Southwest Series (1986); NASCAR Grand National Series (1956–1957)

Big Willow (1953–present)
- Surface: Paved
- Length: 2.500 mi (4.023 km)
- Turns: 9
- Race lap record: 1:15.900 ( (United States) Al Lamb, Frissbee GR2, 1987, Can-Am)

Streets of Willow Extended Course (2003–present)
- Length: 1.800 mi (2.897 km)
- Turns: 16

Streets of Willow Long Course (2003–present)
- Length: 1.500 mi (2.414 km)
- Turns: 14

Streets of Willow Long Course (1988–present)
- Length: 1.300 mi (2.092 km)
- Turns: 9

Horse Thief Mile (2003–present)
- Length: 1.000 mi (1.609 km)
- Turns: 9

Jenson Button Karting Circuit
- Length: 0.621 mi (1.000 km)
- Turns: 9

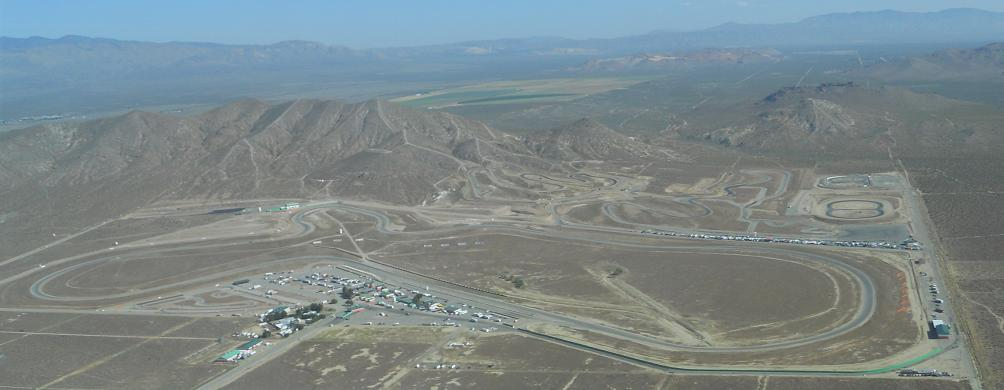
Willow Springs Raceway from the air

Willow Springs International Motorsports Park (commonly referred to as Willow Springs) is located in Willow Springs near Rosamond, California, about 80-mile (130 km) north of Los Angeles. It is the oldest permanent road course in the United States. Construction began in 1952, with the inaugural race held on November 23, 1953. The main track is a 2.500 mi (4.023 km) long road course that is unchanged from its original 1953 configuration. The elevation changes and high average speeds make it a favorite of many road racing drivers.

Willow Springs hosted two NASCAR Grand National Series races in 1956 and 1957 on the original road course (then known simply as Willow Springs Speedway), won by Chuck Stevenson and Marvin Panch, respectively. The track also hosted five NASCAR Winston West Series events, the first two in 1955 and 1956 and the other three between 1984 and 1986. Willow Springs also hosted one NASCAR Southwest Series race in 1986.

Efforts by fans resulted in the State of California declaring Willow Springs International Raceway as a California Point of Historical Interest in 1996.

== History ==
The original intent was to create a replica of the Indianapolis Motor Speedway oval, but space constraints resulted in its final configuration. Ken Miles was among several people involved in planning the layout. The first event was held on November 23, 1953.

The course was very fast from the outset and quickly earned the nickname "The Fastest Road in the West."

In 1962, the course was sold to Bill Huth, who paid $116,000 for the facility and hoped to use the main straight for drag racing. Huth purchased the lease outright in 1980 and soon began expanding the facility. The initial 230 acres (93 ha) expanded to 600 acres (240 ha) with the purchase of adjacent land. A second track, the Streets of Willow, was constructed next, and a third track, Horse Thief Mile, was added in 2003.

Huth died in 2015 at the age of 91.

In June 2024, the venue was listed for sale. In April 2025, CrossHarbor Capital Partners purchased the facility and announced plans for renovations, in collaboration with Singer Vehicle Design, Wurz Design, Hart Howerton, and Sonoma Raceway.

== Tracks ==
There are seven tracks at Willow Springs. The largest and most well known track is Willow Springs International Raceway (commonly referred to as Big Willow). Other racing facilities include The Streets of Willow (1.800 mi (2.897 km) road course), The Horse Thief Mile (road course), The Speedway at Willow Springs (0.250 mi (0.402 km) paved oval), Willow Springs Kart Track (a 0.625 mi (1.006 km), nine-turn paved sprint track), The Playpen (a 0.250 mi (0.402 km) paved training track), and the Walt James Stadium (Clay Oval and Paved Oval).

=== Willow Springs Raceway ===
Turn 3/4/5, or "The Omega", can be seen on the hillside above Pit Lane.

Willow Springs Raceway (commonly called Big Willow or sometimes The Big Track) is a 2.500 mi (4.023 km) paved road course consisting of 9 turns.

- Turn 1: "Castrol corner" is a 90-degree high-speed left-handed turn.
- Turn 2: "The Rabbits Ear" is a double-apex sweeping turn
- Turn 3/4: "The Omega" is an uphill and downhill section with a camber change.
- Turn 5: A quick left-handed turn that sets up for the fastest sections of the track.
- Turn 6: Monroe Ridge
- Turn 7: Repass Pass
- Turn 8: Sometimes called, "The Sweeper," turn 8 is a high-speed right-hand corner. The lead-in to this turn is the fastest section of the racetrack.
- Turn 9: A right-handed turn with a big dip before the apex. This is the final turn before the front straightway to the finish line.

=== The Streets of Willow Springs ===
The Streets of Willow Springs (commonly called The Streets of Willow or sometimes Streets) is a 1.800 mi (2.897 km) paved roadcourse. The track was repaved in late 2021 after numerous complaints of the deteriorating quality of the track.

=== Horse Thief Mile ===
Opened in 2003, the Horse Thief Mile (sometimes called The Mile) is a 1.00 mi (1.61 km) paved roadcourse featuring 9 turns as well as numerous elevation changes. It was designed to simulate a winding mountain road.

=== Willow Springs Kart Track ===
The Willow Springs Kart Track (also called The Jenson Button Karting Circuit) is a 0.625 mi (1.006 km), 9-turn paved sprint course. It is used for karting events and driver training, and is one of the smaller circuits within the wider Willow Springs complex.

=== Speedway Willow Springs ===
The Speedway at Willow Springs is a 0.250 mi (0.402 km) paved oval. The short oval is used primarily for legends cars, bandoleros, and other entry-level stock car categories.

=== Walt James Stadium ===
Named for California racing figure Walt James, the Walt James Stadium is a 0.375 mi (0.604 km) facility consisting of both a clay oval and a paved oval. The facility hosts short-track stock car and open-wheel events within the Willow Springs complex.

== Layout configurations ==
Willow Springs International Motorsports Park layout configurations
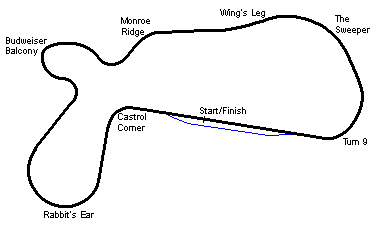
Big Willow (1953–present)

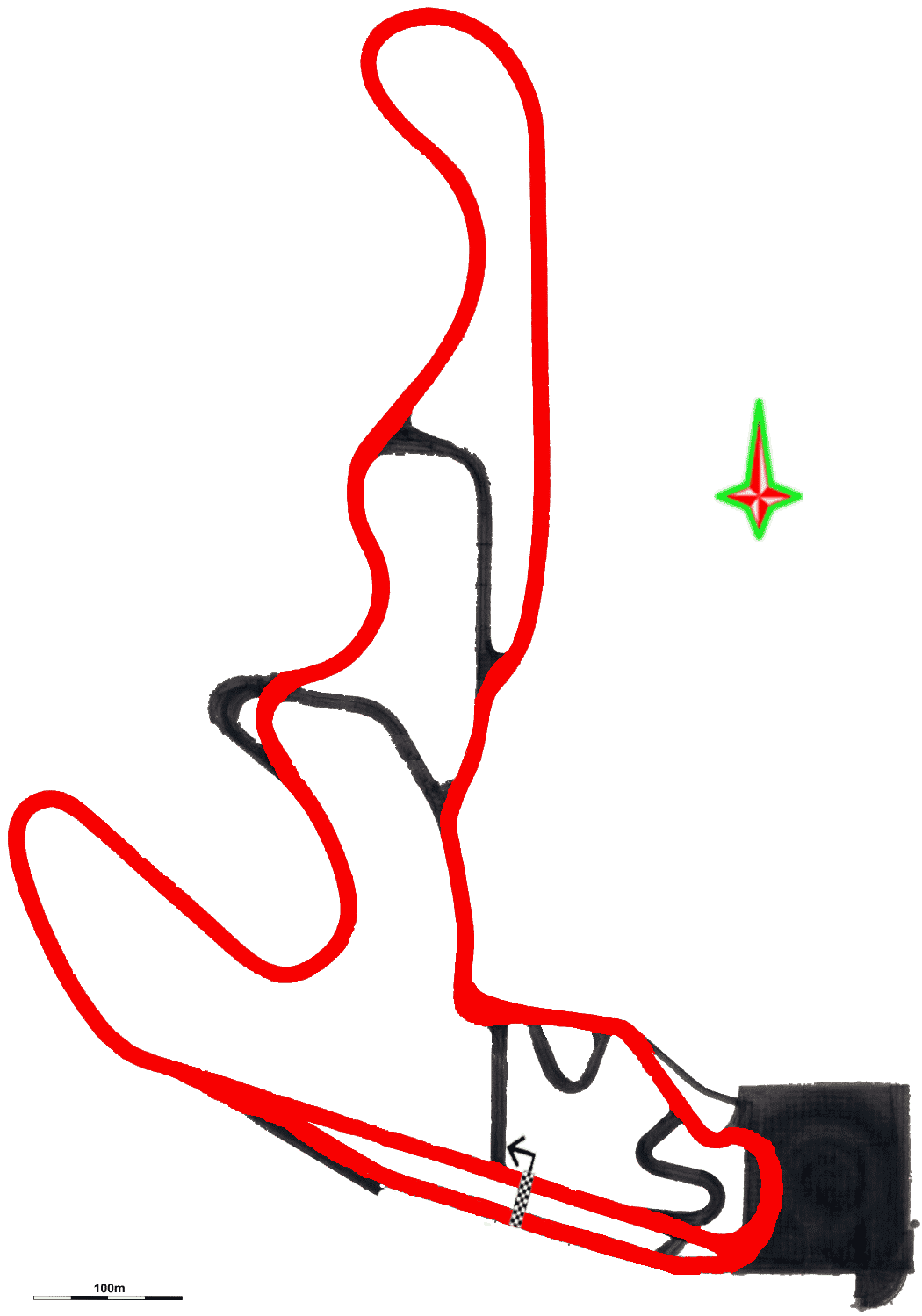
Streets of Willow Extended Course (2003–present)

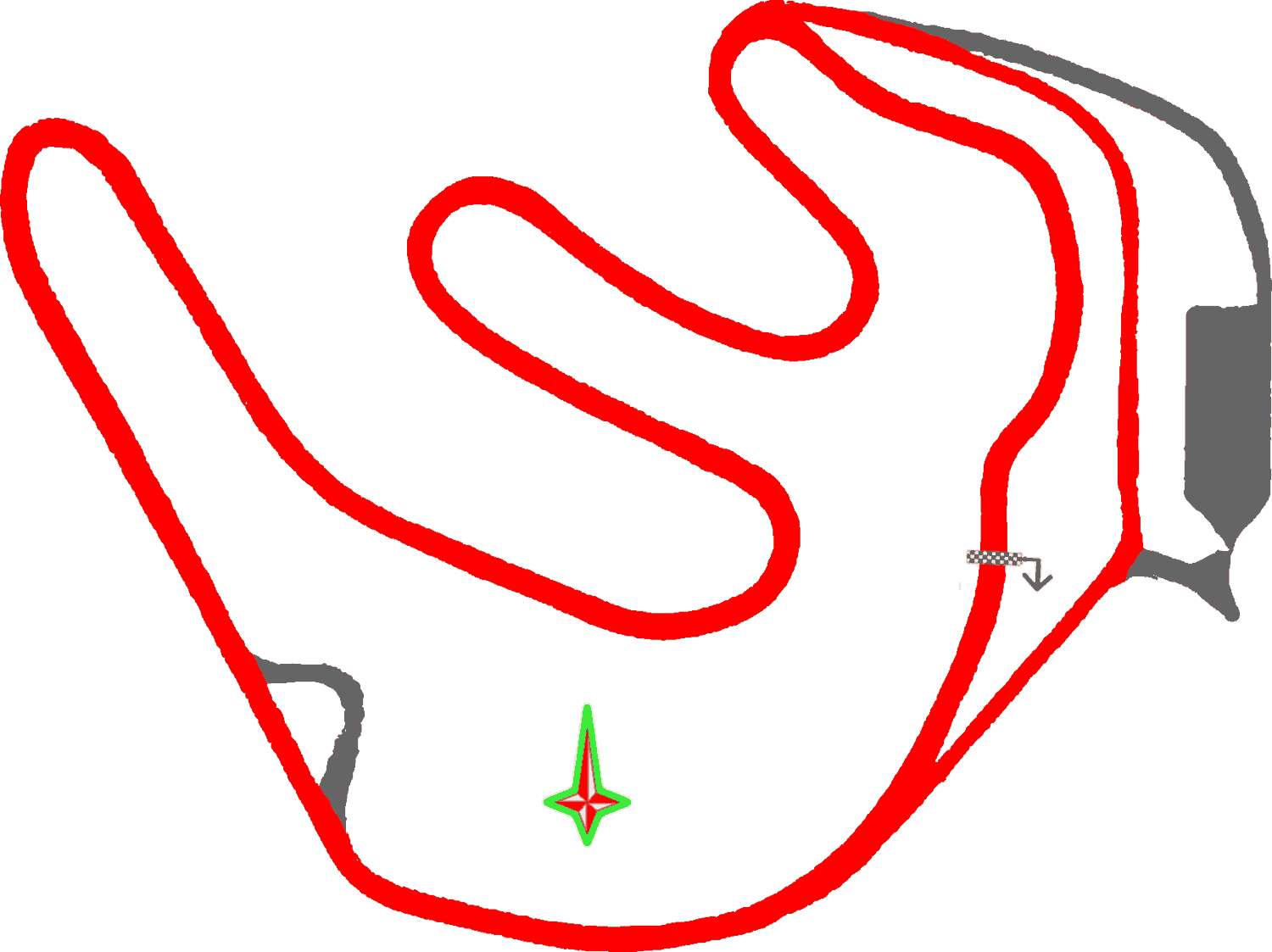
Horse Thief Mile (2003–present)

== Media ==
Willow Springs has been featured in numerous forms of media including movies, television, music videos and video games.

Willow Springs has been used for filming for motion pictures such as 1:42:08: A Man and His Car, the 1968 Disney film The Love Bug, and Ford v Ferrari.

Willow Springs has been used for several TV shows including British BBC program Top Gear, several episodes of Wheeler Dealers and Jay Leno's Garage.

The track was featured in the Japanese Best Motoring International "American Touge" video special.

The track is in the 1985 Christopher Cross music video "Charm the Snake", as well as "It's the Things You Do" by Five.

Willow Springs International Motorsports Park was the venue of a photoshoot session by Playboy for its Playmate pictorial and centerfold featuring Alyssa Arcè as Miss July 2013. The photographs were featured in the magazine's July–August 2013 issue.

Willow Springs tracks have been featured in video games including Need for Speed: ProStreet, Need for Speed: Shift, Gran Turismo 6, Gran Turismo Sport, Gran Turismo 7, Project CARS, Assetto Corsa, and iRacing.

== Lap records ==
The overall unofficial lap record on Big Willow is held by Michael Andretti, who completed a lap of the 2.500 mi (4.023 km) main track in 1:06.050 in a CART Indycar in 1987, for an average speed of 136 miles per hour (219 km/h). The previous unofficial mark of 1:06.300 was set by Nigel Mansell in a Lotus 91 during 1982 F1 testing. As of March 2017, the fastest official race lap records at Willow Springs International Motorsports Park are listed as:

Category	Time	Driver	Vehicle	Event
Permanent Road Course ("Big Willow") (1953–present): 2.500 mi (4.023 km)
Can-Am	1:15.900	Al Lamb	Frissbee GR2	1987 Willow Springs Can-Am round
TA	1:20.839	Greg Pickett	Ford Mustang Trans-Am	2017 Willow Springs Trans-Am West Coast round
Group 4	1:37.100	Frank Monise	Lotus 23	1966 SCCA Regional Willow Springs

== Other motorsport ==
Option hosted an early exhibition drift event in 1996.

During the early 1980s, the factory-backed Renault Formula One team often used Willow Springs to test their cars before the early season United States Grand Prix West held at Long Beach in Los Angeles.

ChampCar Endurance Series hosts a double-8+7-hour endurance race on Big Willow.

Willow Springs was a regular venue for the American Indycar Series (AIS), in some seasons hosting the season opener and/or the season finale.

== Photographs ==
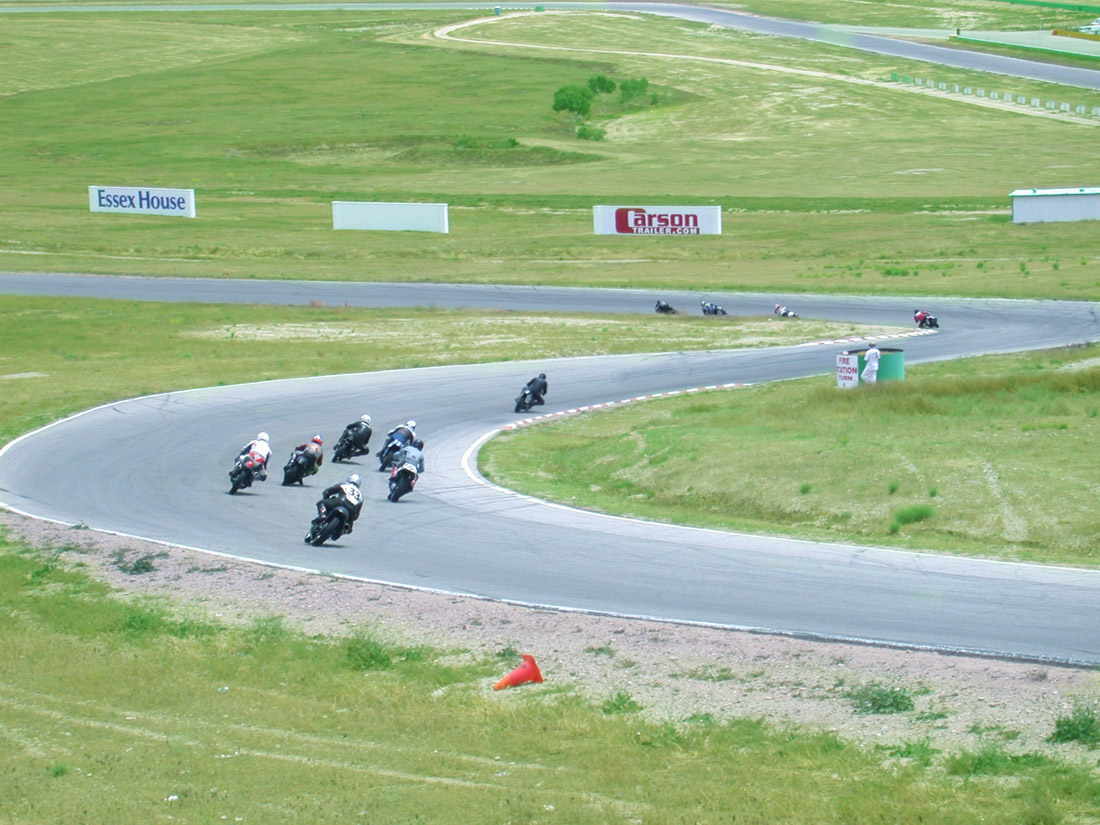
A downhill section of the big track.

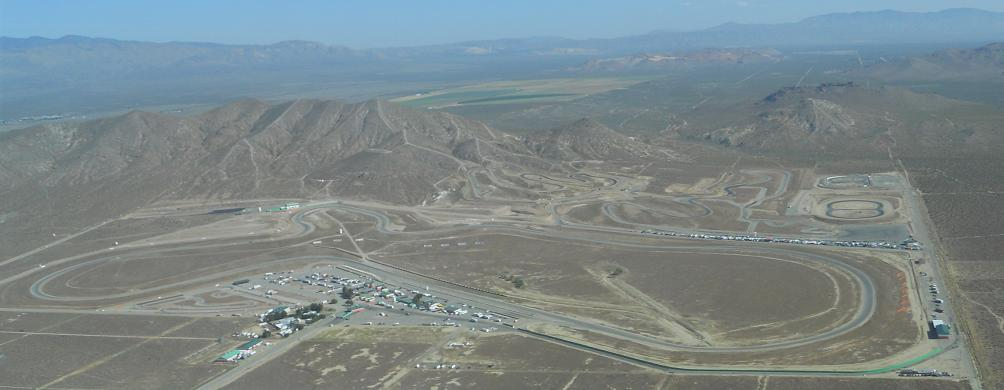
All the tracks, from the air.

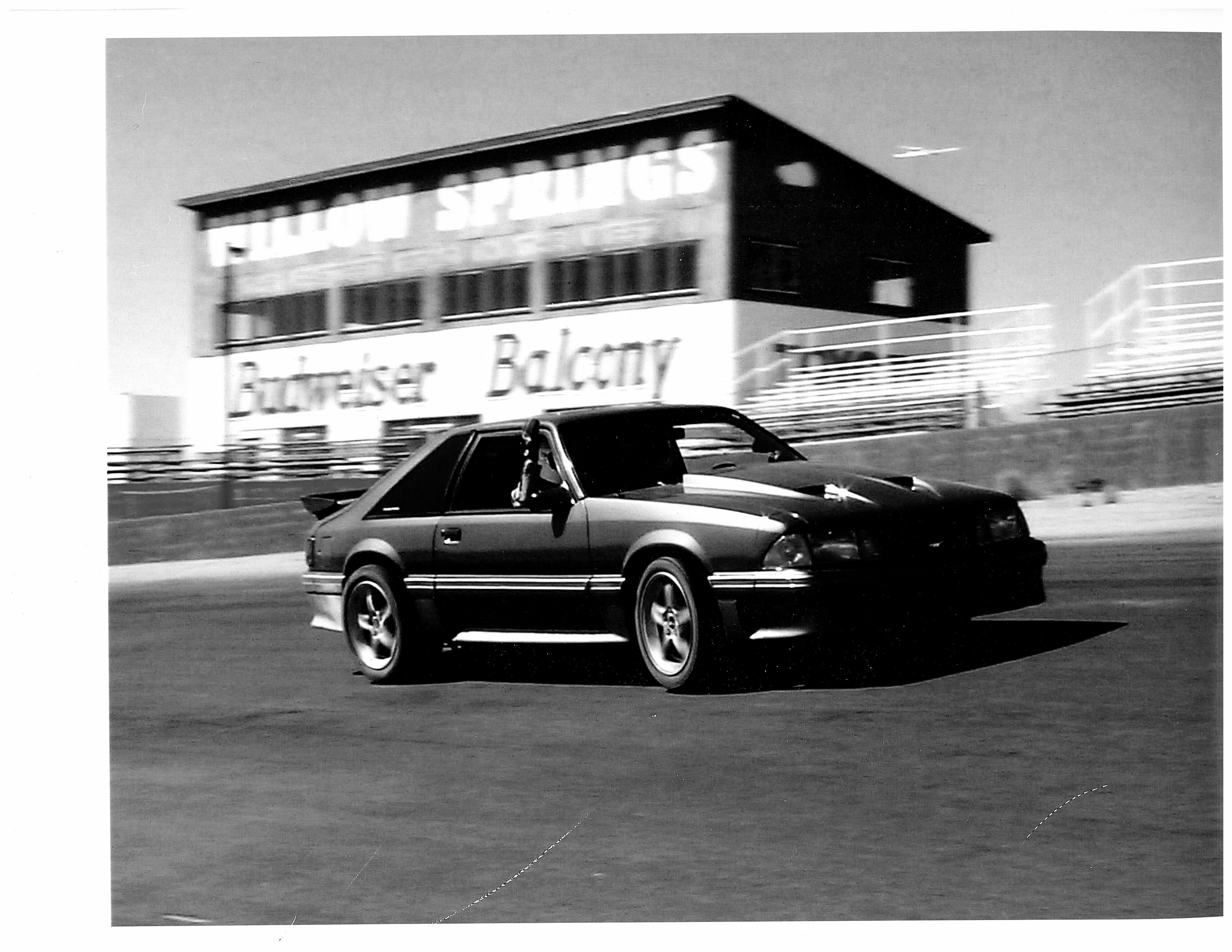
Willow Springs - Big Track - Turn 4

== See also ==
- Buttonwillow Raceway Park
- Chuckwalla Valley Raceway
